= List of Minnesota State High School League Conferences =

A list of the Minnesota State High School League sponsored conferences:

== A-C ==
Conferences in the MSHSL
Conference name	Years active	Member schools	Sports
Arrowhead (Big Standings)		Chisholm High School Deer River High SchoolEly Memorial High School Greenway International Falls High School Mesabi East High School, Aurora; Mountain Iron-Buhl High School	Most Sports (Except Football)
Arrowhead (Small Standings)		Bigfork High School Cherry High School Hill City High School/Northland Littlefork-Big Falls High School North Woods High School	
Big 9		Albert Lea High School; Austin High School; Century High School, Rochester; Faribault High School; John Marshall High School, Rochester; Mankato East High School; Mankato West High School; Northfield High School; Red Wing High School; Mayo High School, Rochester; Owatonna High School; Winona Senior High School	All Sports
Big South (Black)		Belle Plaine Marshall High School New Ulm High School St. Peter High School Tri City United Waseca High School Worthington	
Big South (Gold)		Blue Earth Area High School; Fairmont High School Jackson County Central High School Luverne High School Pipestone Area High School Redwood Valley High School, Redwood Falls St. James High School; Windom Area High School	
Big North		Northeast Range High School; South Ridge High School; William Kelley High School	All Sports
Camden		Canby High School; Central Minnesota Christian High School; Dawson-Boyd High School; Kerkhoven-Murdock-Sunburg High School; Lac qui Parle Valley High School; Lakeview High School; MACCRAY High School; Minneota High School Ortonville High School; Renville County West High School; Tracy-Milroy-Balaton High School; Yellow Medicine East High School	Most Sports (Except Football)
Central Lakes		Alexandria High School; Brainerd High School Detroit Lakes High School; Fergus Falls High School; Rocori High School; Apollo High School, St. Cloud; Sartell High School; Sauk Rapids-Rice High School; Tech High School, St Cloud; Willmar High School	All sports
Central Minnesota		Atwater-Cosmos-Grove City High School Belgrade-Brooten-Elrosa High School; Eden Valley-Watkins High School; Holdingford High School; Kimball Area High School; Maple Lake High School Paynesville High School Royalton High School	All sports
Christian Athletic League		Cambridge Christian; Christian Life, Farmington; Faith Foreston; Good Shepherd Academy, River Falls, WI; Hope Christian, St. Paul Park; Immanuel Lutheran, Mankato; Mt. Lake Christian; North Metro, Roseville; Rochester Area Home School; Schaeffer Academy, Rochester; St. Cloud Christian; Trinity Lutheran, St. Francis; Valley Christian, Taylors Falls	Most Sports (Except Football)

== D-G ==
Conference name	Years active	Schools included	Sports
Eastern Minnesota		Avail Academy, Fridley Community of Peace Academy, St. Paul Cristo Rey Jesuit, Minneapolis Great Oaks Academy, Eagan Great River School, St. Paul Groves Academy, St. Louis Park Hiawatha College Prep, Minneapolis Hmong College Prep Academy, St. Paul Hope Academy, Minneapolis The International School of Minnesota, Eden Prairie Prairie Seeds, Brooklyn Park	Most Sports
Gopher		Bethlehem Academy, Faribault; Blooming Prairie High School; Maple River High School; Medford High School; New Richland-H-E-G High School; Randolph High School; United South Central High School, Wells; Waterville-Elysian-Morristown High School	Most Sports (Except Football)
Gopher Valley A		Bethlehem Academy High School; Blooming Prairie High School; Lester Prairie/Holy Trinity; Loyola Catholic School; Minnesota Valley Lutheran High School; St. Clair High School; United South Central High School, Wells	Football
Gopher Valley AA		Gibbon-Fairfax-Winthrop High School; Lake Crystal-Wellcome Memorial High School; Maple River high School, Mapleton; Medford High School; NRHEG High School, New Richland; Waterville-Elysian-Morristown High School	Football
Granite Ridge		Albany High School; Foley High School; Little Falls High School; Milaca High School Pequot Lakes High School Pierz High School Cathedral High School, St. Cloud	All Sports
Great Northern		Carlton/Wrenshall†; Cromwell-Wright High School; Isle High School Lake of the Woods High School, Baudette; McGregor High School; Nevis High School; Northland High School, Remer; Northome-Kelliher High School; Onamia High School	Football
Great Polar - Blue		Aitkin High School; Braham High School; Crosby-Ironton High School; Hinckley-Finlayson High School; Pine City High School; Rush City High School	Football
Great Polar - Red		Barnum High School; Chisholm High School; Cook County High School, Grand Marais; East Central High School; Ely Memorial High School; Eveleth-Gilbert High School Ogilvie High School	Football
Great Polar - White		The Marshall School, Duluth; Esko High School; Moose Lake-Willow River High School; Two Harbors High School	Football
Great River		Aitkin High School; Braham High School; East Central High School; Hinckley-Finlayson High School; Isle-Onamia†; Ogilvie High School; Pine City High School; Rush City High School Crosby-Ironton High School Mora High School ||Most Sports (Except Football)	

== H-L ==
Conference name	Years active	Schools included	Sports
Heart O'Lakes		Barnesville High School; Breckenridge High School; Dilworth-Glyndon-Felton High School; Frazee High School; Hawley High School; Pelican Rapids High School; Perham High School	Most Sports (Except Football)
Heart O'Lakes - Classic		Breckenridge High School; Dilworth-Glyndon-Felton High School; Hawley High School; Pelican Rapids High School; Roseau High School; Staples-Motley High School; Warroad High School	Football
Heart O'Lakes - North		Crookston High School; Detroit Lakes High School; East Grand Forks High School; Park Rapids High School; Pequot Lakes High School; Perham High School; Thief River Falls High School	Football
Hiawatha Valley		Byron High School; Cannon Falls High School; Goodhue High School; Hayfield High School; Kasson-Mantorville High School; Kenyon-Wanamingo High School; La Crescent High School; Lake City High School; Pine Island High School; Lourdes High School; Stewartville High School; Triton Senior High School; Winona Cotter; Zumbrota-Mazeppa High School	Most Sports (Except Football)
Iron Range		Chisholm High School International Falls High School; Mesabi East High School Deer River High School; Greenway High School	Most Sports
Lake	1932–present	Buffalo High School Eden Prairie High School; Edina High School; Hopkins High School; Minnetonka High School Maple Grove High School St. Michael-Albertville High School; Wayzata High School	All Sports
Lake Superior		Cloquet High School; Duluth Denfeld High School; The Marshall School Grand Rapids High School; Hibbing High School Hermantown High School; Proctor High School Rock Ridge High School; Superior High School (WI)	Most Sports
Little Eight		Ashby High School; Battle Lake High School; Brandon/Evansville† Clinton-Graceville-Beardsley High School; Hancock High School; Hillcrest Lutheran Academy; Parkers Prairie High School; Rothsay High School; Underwood High School; Wheaton/Herman-Norcross†	Most Sports (Except Football)
Little Sioux		Adrian High School; Canby High School; Dawson-Boyd High School; Lac qui Parle Valley High School, Madison; Lakeview High School, Cottonwood; MACCRAY High School, Clara City; Minneota/Lincoln HI, Ivanhoe†; Murray County Central High School, SlaytonRussell-Tyler-Ruthton High School; Tracy-Milroy-Balaton High School	Football

== M ==
Conference name	Years active	Schools included	Sports
Mariucci		Bemidji High School; Crookston High School; East Grand Forks High School; Moorhead High School; Roseau High School; Thief River Falls High School; Warroad High School	Hockey only
Metro East (formerly Classic Suburban)		Hastings High School; Hill-Murray High School; Mahtomedi High School; North High School; St. Thomas Academy; Simley High School; South St. Paul High School; Tartan High School Two Rivers High School	All Sports
Metro West		Benilde-St. Margaret's; Bloomington Jefferson High School Chanhassen High School; Chaska High School; Richfield High School; Robbinsdale Cooper High School; Saint Louis Park High School	All Sports
Mid-State		Park Rapids Area High School; Perham High School; Staples-Motley High School; Wadena-Deer Creek High School	Most Sports
Minneapolis City		Edison High School; Camden High School; North High School; Roosevelt High School; South High School; Southwest High School; Washburn High School	All Sports
Minnesota Charter Schools		FAIR School, Crystal; Math and Science Academy, Woodbury; Minnesota Transitions Charter Schools, Minneapolis; Spectrum High School, Elk River; St. Croix Prep, Stillwater	Basketball, Cross Country, Soccer
Minnesota River		Belle Plaine High School; LeSueur-Henderson High School; Mayer Lutheran High School; Norwood Young-America High School; Sibley East High School, Arlington; Tri-City United High School, Montgomery; Watertown-Mayer High School	Most Sports
Mississippi 8		Becker High School; Big Lake High School; North Branch High School; Cambridge-Isanti High School; Monticello High School; Chisago Lakes High School; Saint Michael-Albertville High School; Zimmerman High School	All Sports
Missota Conference	Disbanding after 2013-14 season	Academy of Holy Angels, Richfield; Chanhassen High School; Chaska High School; Farmington High School; New Prague High School; Northfield High School; Red Wing High School; Shakopee High School	All Sports
Minnesota Christian Athletic Association		Bethany Academy, Bloomington; Heritage Christian Academy, Maple Grove; Holy Trinity High School, Winsted; Legacy Christian Academy, Andover; Lester Prairie High School; Lion's Gate Christian Academy, Bloomington; Maranatha Christian Academy, Brooklyn Park; New Life Academy, Woodbury; PACT Charter School, Ramsey; Providence Academy, Plymouth; Southwest Christian, Chaska; Trinity School at River Ridge, Eagan; West Lutheran High School, Plymouth	Most Sports

== N ==
Conference name	Years active	Schools included	Sports
North Star		Bagley High School; Blackduck High School; Cass Lake-Bena High School; Fertile-Beltrami High School; Fosston High School; Frazee High School; Lake Park-Audubon High School; Mahnomen High School; Pillager High School; Pine River-Backus High School; Red Lake County; Walker-Hackensack-Akeley High School; Warren-Alvarado-Oslo High School	Football
North Tri-County		Ada-Borup High School; Norman County East High School, Twin Valley; Norman County West High School, Halstad; Park Christian School, Moorhead; Rothsay High School; Ulen-Hitterdal High School; Waubun High School; Win-E-Mac High School, Erskine	Football
Northern Lakes		Bigfork High School; Hill City High School; Littlefork-Big Falls High School; Nashwauk-Keewatin High School; Northland High School, Remer	Most Sports
Northland		Blackduck High School; Cass Lake-Bena High School; Laporte High School; Nevis High School; Northome/Kelliher†; Pine River-Backus High School; Red Lake High School; Walker-Hackensack-Akeley High School	Most Sports
Northwest		Crookston High School; East Grand Forks High School; Roseau High School; Thief River Falls High School; Warroad High School	Most Sports
Northwest (Hockey)		Bagley/Fosston†; Lake of the Woods High School, Baudette; Red Lake Falls High School; Kittson County Central High School	Hockey
Northwest Suburban Conference		Andover High School; Anoka High School; Blaine High School; Centennial High School, Circle Pines; Champlin Park High School; Coon Rapids High School; Elk River High School; Osseo High School; Park Center High School, Brooklyn Park; Robbinsdale Armstrong High School Spring Lake Park High School; Totino-Grace High School, Fridley (Football)	All Sports

== O-R ==
Conference name	Years active	Schools included	Sports
Park Region		Bertha-Hewitt High School; Henning High School; Menahga High School; New York Mills High School; Pillager High School; Sebeka High School; Verndale High School	Most Sports (Except Football)
Pheasant (Football)		North: Ashby High School; Bertha-Hewitt High School; Hillcrest Lutheran Academy; Underwood High School; Verndale High School; South: Brandon/Evansville High School; Clinton-Graceville-Beardsley High School; Hancock High School; Ortonville High School; Wheaton/Herman-Norcross†	Football
Pine to Prairie		Ada-Borup High School; Bagley High School; Climax/Fisher†; Fertile-Beltrami High School; Fosston High School; Lake Park-Audubon High School; Mahnomen High School; Norman County East High School; Norman County West High School; Waubun High School; Win-E-Mac High School, Erskine; Ulen-Hitterdal High School	Most Sports (Except Football)
Polar		Barnum High School; Carlton / Wrenshall†; Cook County High School; Cromwell-Wright High School; Esko High School; Floodwood High School; McGregor High School; Moose Lake/Willow River†; William Kelley High School, Silver Bay South Ridge High School; Two Harbors High School	Most Sports (Except Football)
Prairie (Football)		North: Barnesville High School; Long Prairie-Grey Eagle High School; Osakis High School; United North Central†; Upsala/Swanville†; Wadena-Deer Creek High School; South: Browerville High School; KMS High School, Kerkhoven; New York Mills High School; Ottertail Central†; Royalton High School; West Central Area High School, Barrett	Football
Prairie		Browerville High School; Eagle Valley High School, Eagle Bend; Long Prairie-Grey Eagle High School; Osakis High School Swanville High School; Upsala High School; West Central Area High School, Barrett	Most Sports (Except Football)
Red Rock		Adrian High School; Edgerton High School; Ellsworth High School; Fulda High School; Hills-Beaver Creek High School; Mountain Lake Area†; Murray County Central, Slayton; Red Rock Central High School, Lamberton; Southwest Minnesota Christian High School, Edgerton; Heron Lake-Okabena†; Westbrook-Walnut Grove High School	Most Sports (Except Football)

== S ==
Conference name	Years active	Schools included	Sports
Saint Paul City	1898–present	Central High School; Como Park High School; Harding High School; Highland Park High School; Humboldt High School; Johnson High School; Washington High School	All Sports
Sea Range		Cloquet High School Hermantown High School; Hibbing High School Proctor High School; Virginia High School	Football
Seven Star		Badger/Greenbush-Middle River†; Kittson County Central, Hallock; Northern Freeze†; Stephen-Argyle Central High School; Warren-Alvarado-Oslo High School; Goodridge/Grygla-Gatzke†; Lake of the Woods High School, Baudette	Most Sports
Skyline		Concordia Academy Legacy Christian Maranatha Christian New Life Academy Nova Classical Saint Agnes St. Croix Lutheran Academy St. Croix Prep Trinity School at River Ridge	Most Sports
South Central			All Sports
South Suburban	2010–present	Apple Valley High School; Burnsville High School; Eagan High School; Eastview High School; Farmington High School; Lakeville North High School; Lakeville South High School; Prior Lake High School; Rosemount High School; Shakopee High School	All Sports
Southeast		Glenville-Emmons High School; Grand Meadow High School; Houston High School; Lanesboro High School; Leroy-Ostrander High School; Lyle High School/Austin Pacelli High School†; Mabel-Canton High School; Spring Grove High School; Hope Lutheran High School	All Sports
Southeastern Minnesota		Large: Byron High School; Cannon Falls High School; Kasson-Mantorville High School; La Crescent High School; Lake City High School; Plainview-Elgin-Millville High School; Rochester Lourdes High School; Stewartville High School Medium: Dover-Eyota High School; Kenyon Wanamingo High School; Lewiston Altura High School; Pine Island High School; St. Charles High School; Triton High School; Winona Cotter High School; Zumbrota-Mazeppa High School Small: Caledonia High School; Chatfield High School; Fillmore Central High School; Goodhue High School; Hayfield High School; Kingsland High School; Rushford-Peterson High School; Southland High School; Wabasha-Kellogg High School	Football
Southern Confederacy		Alden-Conger High School; Cleveland high School; Edgerton/Ellsworth†; Fulda High School; GHEC/Truman†; Hills-Beaver Creek High School; Janesville-Waldorf-Pemberton High School; Madelia High School; Nicollet High School; Renville County West High School; Westbrook-Walnut Grove High School	Football
Southern Minnesota		Buffalo Lake-Hector High School; Cedar Mountain/Comfrey†; Martin County West High School, Sherburn; Minnesota Valley Lutheran High School, New Ulm; New Ulm Cathedral High School; Red Rock Central High School, Lamberton; Sleepy Eye High School; St. Mary's High School, Sleepy Eye; Southwestern United; Springfield High School; Wabasso High School	Football
Suburban East		Cretin-Derham Hall High School; East Ridge High School, Woodbury; Forest Lake Area High School; Mounds View High School; Park High School, Cottage Grove; Roseville Area High School; Stillwater Area High School; White Bear Lake High School; Woodbury High School	All Sports

== T-Z ==
Conference name	Years active	Schools included	Sports
Three Rivers		Caledonia High School; Chatfield High School; Dover-Eyota High School; Fillmore Central High School, Harmony; Kingsland High School, Spring Valley; Lewiston-Altura High School; Plainview-Elgin-Millville High School; Rushford-Peterson High School; St. Charles High School; Southland High School, Adams; Wabasha-Kellogg High School	Most Sports (Except Football)
Tomahawk		Buffalo Lake-Hector High School; Cedar Mountain/Comfrey†; Gibbon-Fairfax-Winthrop High School; Lester Prairie High School; New Ulm Cathedral High School; Sleepy Eye High School; St. Mary's High School, Sleepy Eye; Springfield High School; Wabasso High School	Most Sports (Except Football)
Top of the State		Badger/Greenbush-Middle River†; Clearbrook-Gonvick High School; Goodridge/Grygla-Gatzke†; Kittson County Central High School, Hallock; Northern Freeze†; Stephen-Argyle High School	Football
Tri-Metro		The Blake School Bloomington Kennedy High School; Breck School; Brooklyn Center High School; Concordia Academy, Roseville; DeLaSalle High School; Minnehaha Academy; Providence Academy Richfield Senior High School; Saint Agnes High School; Saint Anthony Village High School; St. Croix Lutheran High School; St. Paul Academy and Summit School; Visitation High School; Como Park High School, St. Paul (Hockey); Johnson High School, St. Paul (Hockey)| || All Sports	
Two Rivers		Becker/Big Lake†; Legacy Christian; Moose Lake Area; Mora/Hinckley-Finlayson†; North Branch High School; Pine City/Rush City†; WSFLG (WI)†	Hockey
Valley		Alden-Conger High School; Cleveland High School; Granada-Huntley-East Chain High School; Janesville-Waldorf-Pemberton High School; Lake Crystal-Wellcome Memorial; Madelia High School; Martin County West High School; Martin Luther High School; Nicollet High School; St. Clair High School; Truman/Martin Luther	Most Sports (Except Football)
West Central Conference		Benson High School; BOLD High School; Lac Qui Parle Valley High School; Melrose Area High School; Minnewaska Area High School; Montevideo High School; Morris Area Schools; Sauk Centre High School	All Sports
Wright County Conference		Annandale High School Dassel-Cokato High School Delano High School Glencoe-Silver Lake High School Holy Family High School (Victoria) Howard Lake-Waverly-Winsted High School Hutchinson High School Jordan High School Litchfield High School Mound Westonka High School New London-Spicer High School New Prague High School Orono High School Rockford High School Waconia High School Watertown-Mayer High School	All Sports

† - Cooperative program from multiple schools

== Independents ==
=== Basketball ===
Ascension Academy
Bemidji High School
Cambridge Christian
Campbell-Tintah High School
Cannon Valley High School
Circle of Life
Chesterton Academy
CHOF
Christian Life
Clearbrook-Gonvick
Cloquet Christian
Cristo Rey Jesuit
E.C.H.O.
Bug-O-Nay-Gee-Shig School
Duluth East High School
Elmore Academy
Faith Christian Academy
Fond du Lac Ojibwe
Fourth Baptist Christian School
Hope Academy
Hope Christian
Good Shepherd
Grand Rapids High School
Groves Academy
Immanuel Lutheran School
Lake Region
Lakeview Christian Academy
Learning for Leadership
Mesabi Academy
MetroTech Career Academy
Minnetonka Christian Academy
Mounds Park Academy
Nay Ah Shing Schools
Metro North ABE
Park Christian
Rapids Christian
Red Lake County
Rivers Christian
Rochester Home School
Sacred Heart
Saint Paul Preparatory School
South Metro
Sparta Home School
Unidale
Valley Christian School

=== Football ===
Columbia Heights High School
E.C.H.O.
Elmore Academy
Metro Deaf School, St. Paul
MN Academy for the Deaf, Faribault
Red Lake High School
Spectrum High School, Elk River
West Lutheran High School, Plymouth

=== Hockey ===
Achiever Academy, Vadnais Heights
Benilde-St. Margaret's School, St. Louis Park
Breckenridge/Wahpeton†
Dodge County†
East High School, Duluth
Ely Memorial High School
La Crescent High School
North Shore†
Lourdes High School
Highland Park High School, St. Paul

== Former conferences ==
- North Suburban
- Metro Alliance
- Circle 8
