= Southern Football Alliance =

The Southern Football Alliance is a mega-conference for high school football in southeast Minnesota. It was formed in March 2013 and is the combination of schools that belong to both the Three Rivers Conference and the Hiawatha Valley League for other sports. The alliance is divided into three divisions, Red, White, and Blue, based on each school's enrollment.

== Summary ==
The Minnesota State High School League has a football season that is 8 weeks long, ending the week of the Minnesota Education Association's annual conference. This results in each team playing its divisional opponents once. Because the Red and White Divisions each have 8 teams, that results in 7 division games for each team and one game against a team from the other division. The Blue Division has 9 teams, meaning all 8 games will be against divisional opponents. Each Blue Division team receives a bye during the season which facilitates a Week 0, that is played one week earlier than the Red and White Divisions.

Due to scheduling conflicts with TCF Bank Stadium (where the state semi-final and final games are to be played) for the 2015 season, the schedule will begin one week earlier than normal on August 21, 2015.

== Divisions ==
=== Red Division ===
- Byron High School
- Cannon Falls High School
- Kasson-Mantorville High School
- LaCrescent High School
- Lake City High School
- Plainview-Elgin-Millville High School
- Rochester Lourdes High School
- Stewartville High School

=== White Division ===
- Dover-Eyota High School
- Kenyon-Wanamingo High School
- Lewiston-Altura High School
- Pine Island High School
- St. Charles High School
- Triton High School
- Winona Cotter High School
- Zumbrota-Mazeppa High School

=== Blue Division ===
- Caledonia High School
- Chatfield High School
- Filmore Central High School
- Goodhue High School
- Hayfield High School
- Kingsland High School
- Rushford-Peterson High School
- Southland High School
- Wabasha-Kellogg High School
