= Minnesota State Knowledge Bowl Meet =

Annual academic quiz competition

The Minnesota State Knowledge Bowl Meet is an annual, two-day academic quiz competition sponsored by the Minnesota Service Cooperatives, which is Minnesota's governing body of Knowledge Bowl. The State Meet is held in April at Cragun's Resort in Brainerd.

== Format ==
The 48 teams that qualify for the Minnesota State Knowledge Bowl Meet are ordered by enrollment size and then are evenly divided, amongst three divisions with the larger 18 schools in Class AAA, and the smaller 30 schools split between Class A and Class AA. All schools from the Metro Region (Region XI) are automatically placed in Class AAA. While any school has the ability to play up a division, any non-public will play up a division from their class population school size.

The first day of the State Knowledge Bowl Meet begins in the evening with a banquet, at which all the teams are introduced. Following the banquet is the written round which consists of 60 questions. Once the written rounds are scored, the teams are ranked. In the event of a tie after the written round, certain questions will be used to break the tie. The state meet is "power-ranked," that is, teams are grouped together by their current standing as follows:

- Room 1: #1-2-3
- Room 2: #4-5-6
- Room 3: #7-8-9
- Room 4: #10-11-12
- Room 5: #13-14-15
- Room 6: #16-17-18
- Room 7: #19-20-21
- Room 8: #22-23-24

Teams are power ranked for five, 45-question oral rounds. At the end, the team with the highest total score is the State Champion. The top 3 teams receive trophies, and the top 6 teams receive medals. If there is a tie among the top 6 following the fifth and final oral round, it is broken by a 15-question "overtime." The Heritage Spirit Award is given to one team from each class that demonstrates a positive attitude and sportsmanship as voted on by the readers, computer operators, coaches, and other teams.

=== Historical format ===
In 2007, the State Tournament began using strength-of-scoring, or "SOS". After the last oral rounds, teams receive 1.5 extra points for each round they have competed in the top room, 1 extra point for each round in the second room, and 0.5 extra points for each round in the third room. This was done both to help break ties and to recognize that scoring points is harder in top rooms.

Prior to 2000, there was a "championship round," in which the top three teams (after five oral rounds) competed head-to-head to determine who would be champion.

Furthermore, the state meet was not split into two classes until 1996.

Regarding how the State Tournament ended up in the Brainerd resort area, former Metro ECSU Knowledge Bowl coordinator Marilyn McGowan says "It all hinges on a measles outbreak in Thief River Falls the year the tournament was to be held there and the state health department said we would have to cancel our plans to have it there. Thus, at the last minute, it was moved to Cragun's. The original plan was to have each ECSU region host it with it being held throughout the state. However, it worked so well holding it in a resort without the temptations of a city, that it has been held at a Brainerd lakes resort ever since the episode with the measles outbreak. We have also been at Madden's and Breezy Point."

The 1984 tournament had five oral rounds like today's, but in 1986 and 1987 only four oral rounds were played (in addition to the written round and championship round). In 1991 and before, oral rounds consisted of 60 questions. In 1992 the change was made to 45 questions per round.

In 2013, only four oral rounds were used. Due to inclement weather across the state, the Friday schedule was moved back by a couple of hours to allow for late arrivals; the fifth oral round was eliminated to keep the meet more on schedule. This weather caused some schools to not be able to attend at all. Only 21 AA teams attended, instead of the usual 24.

== State champions and runners-up ==
Blanks indicate incomplete records. A second score by a team name indicates score in championship round (through 1999) or score in tiebreaker round (2000 and after). * denotes meet was 4 oral rounds instead of 5 due to weather. ** denotes shortened, remote meet due to COVID protocols (40 question written round and 4 oral rounds of 35 questions).

Year/Tier	First place	Second place	Third place	Fourth Place	Fifth Place	Sixth Place
1982	Fergus Falls				Duluth Cathedral	
1983	Fergus Falls	Duluth Cathedral				
1984	Fergus Falls (171)	Hibbing II (157)	Brainerd (151)	Moorhead (151)	Maynard (146)	Princeton (145)
1985	Fergus Falls (__)	Hibbing (__)				
1986	Little Falls (132, 17)	Moorhead 1 (136, 15)	Apple Valley (122, 13)	Melrose (122)	Chaska (120)	Cambridge (116)
1987	Duluth Cathedral (136, __)	Perham (129, __)	Rosemount/Apple Valley (123, __)	Atwater/Grove City (119)	International Falls (118)	Duluth East (116)
1988	Moorhead (__)	Elk River (__)	Motley (__)			
1989	Northfield (127, 20)	Moorhead (128, 14)	Sebeka (127, 9)	Elk River (124)	Staples-Motley (122)	Willmar (120)
1990	Greenbush (__)	Moorhead (__)	Northfield (__)			
1991	Bemidji (137, __)	Moorhead (147, __)	St. Cloud Apollo (138, __)	Staples/Motley (132)	Fergus Falls (129)	New London/Spicer (128)
1992	Chaska 1 (122, 22)	Duluth East (126, 11)	Centennial (122, 5)	Chaska 2 (121)	MACCRAY (118)	Jefferson (117)
1993	Chaska Purple (124, 16)	Chaska Gold (122, 12)	Moorhead Orange (128, 6)	Moorhead Black (119)	Jefferson (118)	Saint John's Prep (117)
1994	Moorhead Black (114, __)	Chaska (114, __)	MACCRAY (117, __)	Fairmont (111)	Perham (109)	St. Thomas Academy (107)
1995	Chaska (129, __)	Hibbing (117, __)	Cannon Falls (121, __)	Blake (115)	Fairmont (115)	St. Thomas Academy (115)
1996 A	Grygla (115, 19)	Sartell (115, 11)	Fisher (115, 8)	Litchfield (114)	Murray County Central (109)	Cannon Falls (107)
1996 AA	Hibbing (124, 19)	Chaska Gold (126, 11)	St. Cloud Tech (120, 10)	Blake (114)	Northfield (112)	Cretin-Derham Hall (111)
1997 A	Morris (123, __)	Murray County Central (114, __)	St. Cloud Cathedral (109, __)	Win-E-Mac (104)	Duluth Marshall (103)	Albany (102)
1997 AA	Chaska (113, 12)	Centennial (113, 10)	Willmar (112, 9)	Moorhead (112)	Hibbing (107)	St. Cloud Tech 1 (107)
1998 A	Murray County Central (112, 22)	Becker (115, __)	Fosston (113, __)	Cannon Falls (112)	Montevideo (110)	TIE Chisolm, Grygla (106)
1998 AA	Cretin-Derham Hall (119, __)	Hibbing (114, __)	Chaska (113, __)	Centennial (113)	Little Falls (112)	Brainerd (111)
1999 A	Moose Lake (104, __)	Grygla (119, __)	Redwood Valley (108, __)	Ortonville (103)	Loyola (102)	Duluth Marshall (102)
1999 AA	Cretin-Derham Hall White (119, 15)	Chaska (115, 13)	St. Cloud Tech (123, 11)	Hibbing Green (114)	Eagan (110)	Cretin-Derham Hall Blue (110)
2000 A	Moose Lake (111)	Redwood Valley (110)	Saint John's Prep (107)	Minnesota Valley Lutheran (102)	NRHEG (94)	Chisholm (93)
2000 AA	St. Cloud Tech (121)	Blake (115)	Chaska (114)	Hibbing (113)	Cretin-Derham Hall (109)	Hastings (108)
2001 A	NRHEG (133)	Redwood Area (121)	Saint John's Prep (121)	Cook (119)	Moose Lake (117)	Minnesota Valley Lutheran (117)
2001 AA	Hibbing Tan (151)	St. Thomas Academy (124)	Chaska Purple (120)	Moorhead Red (119)	Bemidji (117)	Buffalo (117)
2002 A	Cook (112)	Springfield (110)	Osakis (110)	Pelican Rapids (108)	Becker (105)	Moose Lake (104)
2002 AA	St. Thomas Academy (132)	Moorhead (126)	Chaska (121)	Hibbing Blue (120)	Rocori Area (113)	Apple Valley (113)
2003 A	Springfield (116)	Blackduck (106)	Park Christian (Moorhead) (103)	Moose Lake (102)	Cook (St. Louis County) (102)	Lake Park Audubon (100)
2003 AA	Chaska (120)	Moorhead (113)	Rochester Mayo (110)	Bemidji (110)	St. Thomas Academy (107)	Northfield (106)
2004 A	Park Christian (Moorhead) (115)	East Grand Forks (105)	Ulen-Hitterdal (105)	Lac qui Parle Valley (104)	Pequot Lakes (100)	Blackduck (99)
2004 AA	St. Anthony Village (114)	Mahtomedi (113)	St. Thomas Academy (112)	Chaska (112)	Moorhead White (111)	Hibbing (108)
2005 A	East Grand Forks (111)	Win-E-Mac (110)	Montevideo (107)	Lac qui Parle Valley (106)	Blue Earth (98, 5)	Fairmont (98, 3)
2005 AA	St. Thomas Academy (122)	Chaska Purple (113)	St. Anthony Village (112)	Moorhead Orange (107)	Buffalo (107)	Hermantown (103)
2006 A	Saint John's Prep (114)	Redwood Area Black (110)	Lake Park-Audubon (103)	Staples-Motley (102)	Dover-Eyota (101)	Roseau (101)
2006 AA	St. Anthony Village (123)	Chaska (121)	Buffalo (118)	St. Thomas Academy (117)	Eden Prairie (114)	Moorhead Gold (112)
2007 A	Glencoe-Silver Lake (139.5)	Morris (123)	Minnesota Valley Lutheran (119.5)	Lake Park Audubon (119)	Saint John's Prep (114)	Lac qui Parle Valley (112.5)
2007 AA	St. Anthony Village (146.5)	Eden Prairie (130)	Moorhead (128)	St. Thomas Academy/Visitation (128)	Chaska (122.5)	Prior Lake (121.5)
2008 A	Saint John's Prep (121.5)	Lac qui Parle Valley (118.5)	Sebeka (109.5)	Houston (109)	Redwood Area (108)	Dover-Eyota (106)
2008 AA	Eden Prairie (130)	Prior Lake-Savage (129.5)	Simley (119.5)	St. Anthony Village (118.5)	Minnesota Valley Lutheran (116.5)	Chaska (116)
2009 A	Loyola Catholic (120)	Redwood Area (115)	Saint John's Prep (113.5)	Montevideo (111)	Sebeka (109.5)	Rushford-Peterson (107.5)
2009 AA	Chaska (142.5)	Rochester Mayo (119.5)	Prior Lake-Savage (117)	St. Anthony Village-Helen (116)	Glencoe-Silver Lake (115.5)	Simley (114)
2010 A	Sebeka (162.5)	Crookston (116.5)	Sibley East (112, 5)	New London-Spicer (112, 4)	Duluth Marshall (112, 1)	Albany (111.5)
2010 AA	St. Anthony (131.5)	Little Falls (128)	St. Thomas Academy (125)	Holy Family Catholic (119.5)	Chaska (118)	Prior Lake (116)
2011 A	Sebeka (146.5)	International Falls Purple (117.5)	Crookston (115)	Saint John's Prep (112)	Zimmerman (107)	Minnesota Valley Lutheran (106.5)
2011 AA	St. Anthony (137.5)	Chaska (130)	Fergus Falls (126.5)	Moorhead (118)	Rochester Mayo (117)	Bemidji (116.5)
2012 A	Saint John's Prep (141.5)	Minnesota Valley Lutheran (120.5)	Pelican Rapids (113.5)	Windom (110.5)	Cloquet (107.5)	Breckenridge (104.5)
2012 AA	Chaska Red (130.5)	Academy of Holy Angels (123)	Rochester Mayo (117)	Spring Lake Park (114)	Chaska White (113)	Moorhead Orange (112.5, 6)
2013 A*	Glencoe-Silver Lake (115)	Saint John's Prep (107)	Bagley (102)	Crookston (97.5)	Albany (97)	Pelican Rapids (96)
2013 AA*	Spring Lake Park (121.5)	Chaska (119)	Buffalo (108.5)	Chanhassen (107.5)	Sartell (106.5)	St. Cloud Tech (103)
2014 A	Saint John's Prep (128.5)	Glencoe-Silver Lake Black (120)	Plainview-Elgin-Millville (111.5)	Tri-City United (110.5)	Albany (103.5)	Mountain Lake (103.5)
2014 AA	Buffalo Purple (126)	St. Thomas (124.5)	Chanhassen (119)	Hutchinson (118)	Eastview (116.5)	Prior Lake (113.5)
2015 A	Glencoe-Silver Lake Black (130.5)	Saint John's Prep Red (129)	Tri-City United (112.5)	Plainview-Elgin-Millville (111.5)	Mountain Lake (107)	Saint John's Prep Blue (107)
2015 AA	Alexandria (133.5)	Chaska (125.5)	Buffalo (123.5)	Sartell (119.5)	Bemidji (118)	Big Lake (116.5)
2016 A	Saint John's Prep Red (126)	Glencoe-Silver Lake Black (118.5)	Morris (111.5)	Saint John's Prep Blue (110)	Tri-City United (107.5)	Glencoe-Silver Lake Purple (99.5)
2016 AA	Academy of Holy Angels (136.5)	St. Thomas Academy (124)	Chaska (123)	Buffalo (118)	Prior Lake (116)	Moorhead (114.5)
2017 A	Glencoe-Silver Lake (138.5)	Saint John's Prep (126)	Melrose Gold (107)	Hillcrest (107)	MN Valley Lutheran (101)	International Falls (99.5)
2017 AA	St. Thomas Academy (142.5)	Big Lake (122)	Chaska (120.5)	Sauk Rapids Rice (118.5)	Edina (118.5)	Anoka (118)
2018 A*	Glencoe-Silver Lake (127)	MN Valley Lutheran (112.0)	International Falls (108.5)	Cook County (107)	Hawley (103)	Park Christian (99.5, 6)
2018 AA*	Sartell-St. Stephen (122)	Edina (114)	Rochester Mayo (110.5)	Mankato West (105)	Holy Family Catholic (104.5)	Saint Thomas Academy (104)
2019 A	MN Valley Lutheran Black (129.5)	Hawley (124)	Saint John's Prep (118.5)	Glencoe-Silver Lake Black (117.5)	St Cloud Cathedral (115.5)	East Central (111)
2019 AA	Prior Lake (136.5)	Sartell-St. Stephen (130)	Mankato West (129.5)	Moorhead Orange (126.5)	Chanhassen (120.5)	Tartan (117)
2021 A**	Saint John's Prep (86)	MN Valley Lutheran (82)	Melrose (77.5)	Annandale (76.5)	Park Christian Red (71.5)	Eden Valley Watkins (70.5, 6)
2021 AA**	Northfield Maroon (89)	Tartan (88.5)	Chaska (83.5)	Academy of Holy Angels (81)	Prior Lake Gold (80.5)	Buffalo Black (78.5)
2022 A	Park Christian (114.5)	Saint John's Prep (114)	Holy Family Catholic (109.5)	Melrose (108.5, __)	MN Valley Lutheran (108.5, __)	Parkers Prairie (106.5)
2022 AA	Buffalo Black (125.5)	Owatonna (122.5)	Chaska (117)	Northfield White (115.5)	Minnetonka (114)	Brainerd Blue (111)
2023 A	Parkers Prairie (141.5)	Greenbush-Middle River (108)	Cook County (103)	Central (102.5)	Sleepy Eye (102)	Fosston (98.5)
2023 AA	Melrose (121.5)	MN Valley Lutheran (119.5)	New Ulm (113.5)	Glencoe-Silver Lake (110)	Winona (110)	Hermantown (108.5)
2023 AAA	Owatonna (157.5)	Buffalo-Hanover-Montrose (125.5)	Minnetonka (121)	Moorhead (119.5)	Alexandria (116)	Edina (115.5)
2024 A	MN New Country School (108.5)	Fosston (102)	St. Clair (100)	Warroad (95.5)	Lakeview (94)	Central (93)
2024 AA	New Ulm Purple (121.5)	New Ulm Ivory (110)	Melrose (106)	Kasson-Mantorville (105.5)	Park Christian (105.5)	Albany (100)
2024 AAA	Edina (151.5)	Sartell-St. Stephen (120)	Northfield Maroon (114.5)	Holy Family Catholic (113.5)	Buffalo-Hanover-Montrose (111)	Chaska (110.5)
2025 A	Fosston (115.5)	Aitkin (98)	Esko (91)	Nevis (90.5)	Ely (89)	Roseau (80.5)
2025 AA	Melrose (127.5)	Albany (95)	Park Christian (94.5)	Glencose-Silver Lake Black (94.5)	MN Valley Lutheran (93.5)	Marshall Duluth Gold (93.5)
2025 AAA	Edina (143.5)	New Ulm (108.5)	Sartell-St. Stephen (106)	Benilde-St. Margaret's (105.5)	Chaska (105)	Buffalo-Hanover-Montrose (103.5)
2026 A	Fosston (136.5)	Aitkin Red (105.5)	Aitkin Black (85)	Redwood Area (84.5)	Pine River Backus (84)	Ulen-Hitterdal (82)
2026 AA	Melrose (118.5)	New Ulm Purple (111.5)	St. John's Prep (108.5)	Albany (103)	Perham (101.5)	Park Christian (100)
2026 AAA	Northfield Gold (126.5)	Chaska (125.5)	Edina White (117)	Minnetonka (110)	Saint Thomas Academy (108)	Northfield Maroon (105.5)

== Historical Records ==
=== State Championships ===
Top five schools on total number of Minnesota State Championships regardless of division (eight ties for 7th):

Rank	School	# of Titles	Years
1	Chaska	7	2012, 2009, 2003, 1997, 1995, 1993, 1992
2	St. John's Prep	6	2021, 2016, 2014, 2012, 2008, 2006
3	Glencoe Silver Lake	5	2018, 2017, 2015, 2013, 2007
4	St. Anthony	5	2011, 2010, 2007, 2006, 2004
5	Fergus Falls	4	1985, 1984, 1983, 1982
T-6	Moorhead	3	2004. 1994, 1988
T-6	St. Thomas	3	2017, 2005, 2002
T-6	Northfield	3	2026, 2021, 1989
T-6	Melrose	3	2026, 2025, 2023

==== State Championships (by division) ====
AAA(2023-present)
Rank	School	# of Titles	Years
1	Edina	2	2025, 2024
T-2	Owatonna	1	2023
T-2	Northfield	1	2026

AA(1996-present)
Rank	School	# of Titles	Years
1	St. Anthony	5	2018, 2017, 2015, 2013, 2007
2	Chaska	4	2012, 2009, 2003, 1997
3	St. Thomas	3	2017, 2005, 2002, 2000

A(1996-present)
Rank	School	# of Titles	Years
1	St. John's	6	2021, 2016, 2014, 2012, 2008
2	Glencoe Silver Lake	5	2018, 2017, 2015, 2013, 2007
3	Melrose	3	2026, 2025, 2023
