= South Suburban Conference =

South Suburban Conference can refer to one of the following:

- South Suburban Junior High School Conference (Illinois), a middle school sports conference in Illinois
- South Suburban Conference (Illinois), a high school sports conference in Illinois
- South Suburban Conference (Minnesota), a high school sports conference in Minnesota
- South Suburban Conference (Georgia), a high school sports conference in Georgia
