= Minnesota River Conference =

High school sports conference in Minnesota, US

The Minnesota River Conference (MRC) is a Minnesota high school sports conference, formed in the late 1950s. It serves mainly the Southwestern Suburbs of the Twin Cities. Mayer Lutheran is furthest north while former member (until 2024), Tri-City United (TCU), was its furthest south.

The schools in the conference have had success at the highest level with 32 State Champions. The conference has consistently had teams in each sports' respective state tournament on a regular basis.

== History ==
=== Foundation ===
On April 9, 1959 at the Belle Plaine High School, eight area schools voted on the creation of a conference that would last for 64 years. The Minnesota River Conference was born with Montgomery Superintendent G. Feipel elected as the first President of the MRC. The schools were part of the now-defunct District 13; the original schools included: Le Sueur, Le Center, Arlington, Montgomery, Belle Plaine, Jordan, Lakeville, and New Prague. Waterville was also a school that had a desire to join the conference but ultimately did not. Rosemont and Norwood (who joined the conference a year later) also had a desire to join the conference and would have been let in had Le Center decided to not join.

Lakeville did not ever play football in the MRC and was only a part of the conference for the first year. Even though Lakeville high school was mentioned as a member in early newspaper accounts, their participation in conference sports seemed sporadic in that first year. There are some news articles about them competing in Basketball and Track & Field; no reason is noted as to why they did not continue as a member.

The sports the conference would sponsor would be Football, Boys Basketball, Wrestling, Baseball, Track & Field, and Boys' Golf. The conference presented regular season championship trophies to the leading teams in these sports.

=== Developments to 2000 ===
Change in population, enrollment and the sports offered have changed so much in the decades since the conference was founded. For example, when Lakeville joined, they had a population of only 924 according to the 1960 U.S. Census and New Prague's population was 2,533. One of the first changes to the MRC occurred in just the second year of the conference when Norwood joined the MRC to compete in athletics. Norwood was the first "non-District 13" member to belong to the MRC.

The conference membership was stable until 1978, when New Prague withdrew from the conference. New Prague was about to be voted out of the conference by a vote of the member schools, but it officially discontinued MRC play after the 1978–79 season, to be admitted into the Missota conference. It was deemed by a majority of the conference schools that New Prague's superior size in enrollment, when compared to the other MRC schools, gave them a competitive advantage. With New Prague out, the conference looked to include another school to keep the membership at eight teams, which would provide for a more convenient and balanced scheduling process. The MRC then invited its first private school member, Mankato Loyola, to join the league. Loyola had been a previous member of the DeSmet conference.

=== Developments early 2000s ===
The MRC remained constant until the 2001–02 school year, when Loyola left the MRC to join the Gopher conference, which it felt better suited their enrollment. Loyola was replaced by the conference's second private school, Mayer Lutheran, former member of the Tri-Metro conference. The following year saw another change, as long-time member Le Center left to join the Gopher/Valley conference alignment. This necessitated the addition of another private school, Holy Family Catholic, which had opened its doors in 2001 and had been independent in activities. The next change occurred in 2010–11, which marked the last year of competition in the MRC for Holy Family. Like New Prague, approximately 30 years earlier, Holy Family was voted out of the MRC by a majority of the MRC schools. Their place was taken by Watertown-Mayer, which came from the Wright County Conference, once again “balancing” the league with eight members.

Changes also occurred within the MRC as certain member schools merged, formed cooperative sponsorships, and paired their sports programs as well as their districts. Mergers included Le Sueur with Henderson to form LeSueur-Henderson (LSH), Arlington-Green Isle merged with Gaylord to form the Sibley East (SE) Wolverines, and Montgomery-Lonsdale merged with LeCenter to form the Tri-City United Titans.

=== Developments from 2015 ===
The changes intensified over the next decade of the MRC. Watertown-Mayer left the conference in 2015. That left the MRC with seven teams until Southwest Christian high school was admitted in 2018, as the conference sought to retain the preferred number of eight schools. Longtime MRC member, Jordan, left the conference in 2020, seeking larger schools to compete against. Southwest Christian's membership did not last long as they left the conference in 2021. Lester Prairie was admitted in 2021, giving the MRC seven members.

The final months of the conference came as TCU decided to leave the MRC after the 2023–24 season to enter the Big South Conference, seeking conference schedules for all of their sports. With TCU leaving, this would have left the MRC with only six teams. This led Belle Plaine, and then Norwood Young America to begin seeking other conferences. For this reason, LSH and Sibley East (SE) also began looking for alternatives. LSH and SE became part of a new athletic conference South Central Conference, with Maple River, St. Clair, Lake Crystal-Wellcome Memorial, and Minnesota Valley Lutheran. Belle Plaine joined TCU in the Big South conference, while Norwood Young America is set to enter the Wright County Conference. Mayer Lutheran will move to the Minnesota Classical Athletic Association and Lester Prairie will be placed by the MSHSL in the Tomahawk-Valley Conference – a new conference merging two staples, the Tomahawk and the Valley.

There have also been cooperative sponsorships in numerous activities. Arlington-Green Isle paired with Henderson in football for two seasons. Jordan and Belle Plaine formed Scott West for their wrestling program. Montgomery and LeCenter had paired several activities in various seasons as well as several other schools who have paired or co-oped programs over the years to offer activities.

=== Mascots ===
There have been some changes in school mascots, as with many school districts across Minnesota. Norwood Young America dropped the use of the name Indians and became the Raiders. Arlington-Green Isle's merger with Gaylord also laid to rest AGI's use of Indians as a mascot. Eventually with the advent of Title IX Girls sports more options began to open in the conference with Tennis, Volleyball, Girls Basketball, Girls Golf and Softball and so did a team name. Jordan adopted the mascot Jaguar for their girls' teams.

== Membership ==
Member schools as at 2021:

- Belle Plaine Tigers
- Lester Prairie
- Le Sueur-Henderson Secondary School (LSH)
- Mayer Lutheran Crusaders
- Norwood Young America Central Raiders
- Sibley East High School (SE)
- Tri-City United High School (TCU): left 2023–2024

=== School changes and membership ===
In the 1960s and for most of the 70s, teams in the conference were:

- Arlington-Green Isle
- Belle Plaine
- Jordan, Le Center
- Le Sueur
- Montgomery
- New Prague
- Norwood-Young America

New Prague left the conference beginning with the 1979-80 school year as it had grown much quicker than the other schools. Mankato Loyola replaced New Prague.

For the years 1986–1989, Henderson High School was paired with Arlington-Green Isle, forming the Sibley East Bengals. In 1990, Henderson paired with Le Sueur, forming what was to become officially in 1992 as the Le Sueur-Henderson (LSH) School District. Later, Arlington-Green Isle merged with Gaylord and became Sibley East in 1995. As the other schools got larger, Mankato Loyola and Le Center had stagnant enrollment. In 2002, Mankato Loyola left and was replaced by Mayer Lutheran. The following year saw Le Center leave and was replaced by Holy Family Catholic.

In 2011, Holy Family Catholic left and was replaced with Watertown-Mayer. Beginning with the 2012–2013 school year, Montgomery-Lonsdale consolidated with former conference member Le Center and became Tri-City United. In 2015, Watertown-Mayer left and returned to the Wright County Conference. In the 2018–19 school year, the Minnesota River Conference gained Southwest Christian High School, who previously competed in the Minnesota Christian Athletic Association. SWC left after the 2020–21 school year. At the conclusion of the 2019–2020 school year, Jordan left the conference. Lester Prairie joined beginning in the 2021–22 school year.

=== Former members ===
- New Prague Trojans: 1959–1979
- Mankato-Loyola Catholic School Crusaders: 1979–2002
- Le Center Wildcats: 1959–2003
- Holy Family Catholic Fire: 2003–2011
- Watertown-Mayer Royals: 2011–2015

== State and national ==
=== State Champions ===
The Minnesota River Conference has had success on the big stage when competing in State Tournaments. Member Schools have won numerous State Championships throughout the years. The following is a list of Schools along with their respected State Championships:

- Jordan: 1980 Softball, 1983 Football, 2006 Volleyball, 2008 Volleyball
- Le Sueur: 1982 Girls Golf, 1983 Girls Golf, 1986 Boys Basketball, 1989 Boys Golf, 2021 Softball
- Belle Plaine: 1997 Girls Golf, 2015 Volleyball, 2015 Girls Track & Field
- Holy Family Catholic: 2004 Dance, 2006 Dance, 2007 Boys Basketball
- Mankato Loyola Catholic School: 1989 Baseball, 1994 Dance, 2001 Softball
- Montgomery-Lonsdale: 1979 Girls Cross Country, 1984 Boys Cross Country, 1999 Baseball
- Mayer Lutheran: 2003 Girls Track & Field, 1982, 2016, 2017 Volleyball
- New Prague: 1973 Football, 1974 Football
- Sibley East: 1994 Baseball, 1998 Baseball, 2022 Trap Shooting, 2023 Skeet
- Le Center: 1982 Football

=== National placements ===
- Sibley East: 2022 3rd Place Trap Shooting

== All-time school records ==
=== MRC football wins ===
This list goes from 1959 through the 2014 season and includes former members, previous cooperatives and present members and lists all-time conference records, overall conference winning percentages, total football conference championships and either if they were solo or co championships and state championships. In 2015, the Minnesota State High School League created football districts instead of conferences.

#	Minnesota River Conference	Records	Pct.	MRC Championships	Solo	co-champions	State Champions
1	Tri-City United Titans (2012–2014)	16-5-0	.762	1	0	1	0
2	Watertown-Mayer Royals (2011–2014)	21-7-0	.750	2	1	1	0
3	Le Sueur Giants (1959–1989)	152-58-6	.718	10	5	5	0
4	Holy Family Catholic School Fire (2003–2010)	40-16-0	.714	1	1	0	0
5	Le Sueur-Henderson Giants (1990–2014	116-59-0	.663	8	6	2	0
6	Le Center Wildcats (19592002)	201-102-4	.661	9	6	3	1
7	New Prague Trojans (1959–1978)	88-45-6	.655	6	4	2	2
8	Mankato Loyola Catholic School Crusaders (1979–2001)	89-72-0	.553	5	3	2	0
9	Belle Plaine Tigers (1959–2014)	195-193-3	.499	10	6	4	0
10	Sibley East Wolverines (1990–2014)	87-88-0	.497	3	1	2	0
11	Mayer Lutheran Crusaders (2002–2014)	44-47-0	.484	1	0	1	0
12	Sibley East Bengals (1986–1989)	13-15-0	.464	0	0	0	0
13	Jordan Hubmen (1959–2014)	158-230-2	.405	5	2	3	1
14	Montgomery-Lonsdale Redbirds (1959–2011)	142-226-1	.386	6	4	2	0
15	Arlington-Green Isle (1959–1985)	61-122-4	.337	1	1	0	0
16	Norwood Young America Central Raiders (1960–2014)	118-265-8	.302	3	3	0	0

The following table lists the years when the different school members won the conference in terms of football.

Minnesota River Conference Football Titles 1959–2014
School	Years
Belle Plaine	1970, 1978, 1979, 1980, 1992, 1993, 1996, 1998, 2009, 2013
Le Sueur	1960, 1961, 1962, 1967, 1968, 1972, 1977, 1978, 1985, 1987
Le Center	1963, 1964, 1968, 1969, 1982, 1986, 1994, 1999, 2000
Le Sueur-Henderson	1992, 1995, 1996, 2002, 2004, 2005, 2007, 2008
Montgomery-Lonsdale	1965, 1966, 1972, 1976, 1981, 1983
New Prague	1959, 1960, 1961, 1973, 1974, 1975
Jordan	1980, 1983, 1984, 1991, 2006
Mankato Loyola Catholic School	1986, 1988, 1989, 1990, 2000
Norwood Young America Central	2001, 2003, 2011
Sibley East	1991, 1997, 2012
Watertown-Mayer	2013, 2014
Arlington-Green Isle	1971
Holy Family Catholic	2010
Mayer Lutheran	2012
Tri-City United	2013

=== MRC baseball wins ===
This list goes from 1959 through the 2024 season and includes former members, previous cooperatives and present members and lists all-time conference records, overall conference winning percentages, total football conference championships and state championships.

#	Minnesota River Conference	Records	Pct.	MRC Championships	State Champions
1	Norood Young America Raiders (1960–2024)	378-336	52.94%	7	0
2	Jordan Hubmen (1959–2019)	370-287	56.32%	11	0
3	Belle Plaine Tigers (19592024)	344-359	48.93%	10	0
4	Montgomery – Lonsdale Redbirds (1959–2024)	324-222	59.34%	10	1
5	Sibley East Wolverines (1990–2024	252-191	56.88%	7	2
6	Le Sueur Giants (1959–1990)	226-221	50.56%	3	0
7	Mankato Loyola Catholic School Crusaders (1980–2002)	193-113	63.07%	7	1
8	Arlington – Green Isle (1959–1989)	137-119	53.52%	6	0
9	Le Sueur Henderson Giants (1991–2024)	128-144	47.06%	6	0
10	Tri-City United Titans (2012–2024)	122-132	48%	0	0
11	New Prague Trojans (1959–1979)	81-44	64.80%	4	0
12	Mayer Lutheran Crusaders (2002–2024)	81-206	28.22%	0	0
13	Holy Family Catholic Fire (2008–2011)	73-37	66.36%	3	1
14	Le Center Wildcats (1959–2002)	68-230	22.82%	2	0
15	Watertown-Mayer Royals (2011–2014)	51-34	60%	1	0
16	Le Center/ Cleveland (1990–2014)	34-75	31.19%	0	0
17	Lester Prairie Bulldogs (2021–2024)	20-42	32.26%	0	0

The following table lists the years when the different school members won the conference in terms of baseball.

Minnesota River Conference Baseball Titles 1959–2024
School	Years
Jordan	1976, 1980, 1984, 1995, 2004, 2005, 2006, 2007, 2009, 2013, 2019
Montgomery-Lonsdale	1977, 1978, 1985, 1991, 1996, 1997, 1999, 2000, 2001, 2009
Belle Plaine	1970, 1979, 1983, 2014, 2015, 2016, 2017, 2018, 2021, 2024
Sibley East	1991, 1992, 1993, 1994, 1996, 1998, 2003
Mankato Loyola	1981, 1985, 1986, 1987, 1990, 1995, 1996
Norwood Young America Central	1964, 1965, 1967, 1982, 2022, 2023, 2024
Le Sueur	1961, 1962, 1966, 1967, 1968, 1983
Arlington-Green Isle	1971, 1972, 1975, 1988, 1989, 1990
New Prague	1960, 1967, 1973, 1974
Sibley East	1991, 1997, 2012
Le Sueur-Henderson	2002, 2012, 2024
Holy Family Catholic	2008, 2010, 2011
Le Center	1963, 1969
Southwest Christan	2021

== See also ==
- List of Minnesota State High School League Conferences
