= Underwood High School =

Underwood High School can refer to:

- The high school component of Underwood Community School District in Iowa
- The high school component of Underwood School District in Minnesota
- The high school component of Underwood School District 8 in North Dakota
