= Lake Conference =

Minnesota, US high school sports conference

- Classification: MSHSL
- Founded: 1932
- Sports fielded: 27
- No. of teams: 8
- Region: Minnesota

The Lake Conference is a high school athletic conference with eight member high schools in the western and southwestern suburbs of the Twin Cities, Minnesota. It is affiliated with the Minnesota State High School League.

== History ==
The Lake Conference was originally formed in 1932 with the charter members being Hopkins High School, Deephaven High School, Excelsior High School, (Deephaven and Excelsior High Schools were consolidated in 1952 to Minnetonka High School), Mound High School, Saint Louis Park High School, University High School, and Wayzata High School. The name originates from the fact that most of these schools were located in cities where lakes were abundant and that Minnesota is the Land of 10,000 Lakes. All of these schools have since departed, with a majority of them going to the Classic Lake Conference Until 1993, Lake was split into two divisions, Lake Red and Lake Blue, most of the departed schools had been in Lake Blue. These included Robbinsdale Armstrong, Minnetonka, Edina, St. Louis Park, Hopkins, Wayzata, and Robbinsdale Cooper. Richfield also departed to the Classic Lake, but was soon to leave due to a fast declining enrollment and changing demographics.

The departure of the Classic Lake Schools changed the face of the conference forever. All departed schools have sought to rejoin their old conference. The classic line up of the 1970s was: Wayzata High School, Robbinsdale Armstrong High School, Robbinsdale Cooper High School, Robbinsdale High School (closed 1982), Minnetonka High School, Hopkins Lindbergh High School (now Hopkins High School), Hopkins Eisenhower High School (now Eisenhower Community Center), St. Louis Park High School, Edina East High School (now Edina Community Center), Edina West High School (now Edina High School), Richfield High School, Bloomington Lincoln High School (closed in 1982), Bloomington Jefferson High School, and Bloomington Kennedy High School.

In 1957, Bloomington High School entered. This district later divided into Bloomington Lincoln and Kennedy in 1965 and Jefferson High School who joined in 1970. Burnsville entered in 1976. Apple Valley, Rosemount and Eden Prairie joined in 1986. Eagan came in 1990; Lakeville in 1993; Chaska in 1994; Eastview High School in 1997 and Lakeville South in 2005. The school previously known as Lakeville now has the name Lakeville North. Chanhassen opened and became a member in the fall of 2009.

In the 2010–2011 academic year, Apple Valley, Bloomington Jefferson, Bloomington Kennedy, Burnsville, Eagan, Eastview, Lakeville North, Lakeville South, and Rosemount formed a new conference called the South Suburban Conference. Prior Lake High School left the Missota Conference to form the South Suburban with the several former Lake teams. Also, Chaska and Chanhassen will join the Missota conference in 2010. Eden Prairie stayed in the Lake Conference while Edina, Hopkins, Minnetonka, and Wayzata joined the Lake, disbanding the Classic Lake Conference.

In 2018, it was announced St. Michael-Albertville High School and Buffalo High School will be joining the Lake Conference from the Mississippi 8 Conference, in 2019, bringing it to a total of seven schools.

The mission of the Lake Conference is to promote and recognize excellence by providing quality experiences for students in programs of academics, arts, athletics and activities. The Lake Conference conducts its activities under the auspices and in concert of the Minnesota State High School League.

On August 30, 2024, Maple Grove announced that they will be switching from the Northwest Suburban Conference to the Lake Conference in the Fall of 2025, bringing the conference to 8 members.

The Lake Conference Network was launched in the summer of 2025. The Lake Conference Network serves as the official home of the Lake Conference and its 8 member schools. Live streams will be available for a majority of sports at all levels and theater performances. This site also provides schedules, rosters, and other information.

== Members ==
The conference currently consists of 8 member schools.

School	Location	Established	Joined	Enrollment	Nickname	Colors
Buffalo High School	Buffalo	1997	2019	1,533	Bison	
Eden Prairie High School	Eden Prairie	1923	1986	2,514	Eagles	
Edina High School	Edina	1949	2010	2,462	Hornets	
Hopkins High School	Minnetonka	1862	2010	1,712	Royals	
Maple Grove High School	Maple Grove	1996	2025	2,261	Crimson	
Minnetonka High School	Minnetonka	1952	2010	3,353	Skippers	
STMA High School	St. Michael	1969	2019	2,071	Knights	
Wayzata High School	Plymouth	1855	2010	3,533	Trojans	

== Sports ==
Currently member schools compete in 27 interscholastic sports and 14 fine arts activities:

Fall

- Cross Country - Boys
- Cross Country - Girls
- Football
- Soccer - Boys
- Soccer - Girls
- Swimming & Diving - Girls
- Tennis - Girls

Winter

- Volleyball - Girls
- Alpine Ski
- Basketball - Boys
- Basketball - Girls
- Dance Team
- Gymnastics
- Hockey - Boys
- Hockey - Girls
- Nordic Ski
- Swimming & Diving - Boys
- Wrestling

Spring

- Baseball
- Golf - Boys
- Golf - Girls
- Lacrosse - Boys
- Lacrosse - Girls
- Softball - Girls
- Synchronized Swim
- Tennis - Boys
- Track & Field - Boys
- Track & Field - Girls
- Volleyball - Boys
