= Bob Sadek =

American football player and coach (1942–2013)

Biographical details
- Born: August 26, 1942
- Died: May 31, 2013 (aged 70)

Playing career
- 1961–1963: Minnesota
- Position: Quarterback

Coaching career (HC unless noted)

Football
- 1965–1967: Minnesota (assistant)
- 1968–1971: Macalester (assistant)
- 1972: Hamline (assistant)
- 1973: Normandale CC (assistant)
- 1974–1976: Northern Michigan (DB)
- 1977: Hamline
- 1978: New Mexico State (DC)
- 1979–?: Rosemount HS (MN)
- ?: Eagan HS (MN)
- ?: Apple Valley HS (MN)

Baseball
- 1969: Macalester

Head coaching record
- Overall: 2–7 (college football); 9–11 (college baseball)

Robert William Sadek Jr. (August 26, 1942 – May 31, 2013) was an American football player and coach. He served as the head football coach at Hamline University in Saint Paul, Minnesota in 1977, compiling a record of 2–7. Sadek played college football at the University of Minnesota, where he was the starting quarterback in 1963.

== Head coaching record ==
Year	Team	Overall	Conference	Standing	Bowl/playoffs
Hamline Pipers (Minnesota Intercollegiate Athletic Conference) (1977)
1977	Hamline	2–7	2–5	7th	
Hamline:		2–7	2–5		
Total:		2–7			
