= Ayoka Lee =

American basketball player

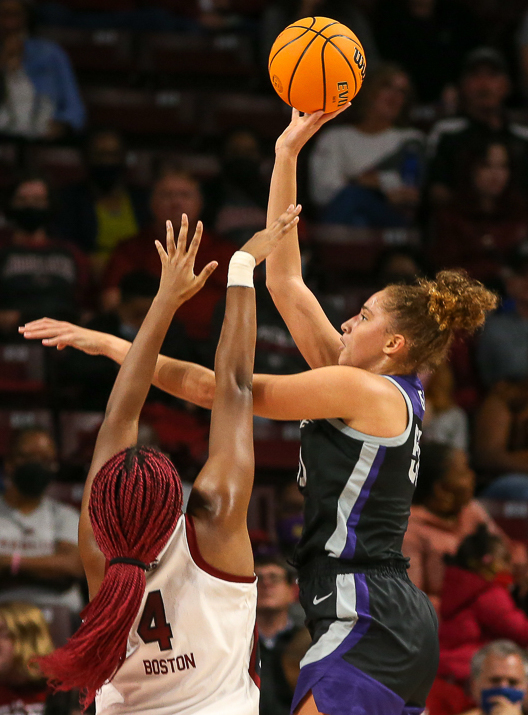
- Lee (right) with Kansas State in 2021

Personal information
- Born: August 12, 2000 (age 26)
- Listed height: 6 ft 6 in (1.98 m)

Career information
- High school: Byron (Byron, Minnesota)
- College: Kansas State (2019–2025)
- Position: Center
- Number: 50

Career highlights
- Second-team All-American – AP, USBWA (2022); 4× First-team All-Big 12 (2020–2022, 2024); 2× Big 12 All-Defensive Team (2022, 2024); Big 12 Freshman of the Year (2020); Big 12 All-Freshman Team (2020)

Ayoka Lee (born August 12, 2000) is a former American college basketball player for the Kansas State Wildcats of the Big 12 Conference. She currently holds the NCAA Division I women's single-game scoring record with 61 points.

== High school career ==
Lee played basketball for Byron High School in Byron, Minnesota. In her sophomore season, she averaged 24.6 points, 13.8 rebounds and 4.5 blocks per game and was named to the Class 3A All-State team. As a junior, Lee averaged 24.9 points, 16.4 rebounds and 4.1 blocks per game, repeating as a Class 3A All-State selection. In her senior season, she averaged 26.6 points, 15.7 rebounds and 5.5 blocks per game. She scored a school-record 54 points against Cotter High School during the Section 1AA tournament. Lee tore her anterior cruciate ligament (ACL) during the state tournament. She earned Class 2A All-State honors and was a finalist for the Minnesota Miss Basketball award. Lee set career and single-season program records for points, rebounds and field goal percentage. In high school, she also competed in volleyball for three years and track and field for two years at the varsity level. A three-star recruit, she committed to playing college basketball for Kansas State.

== College career ==
Lee redshirted her first season at Kansas State to rehabilitate from her torn ACL and was a part of the practice squad. On January 25, 2020, she recorded 23 points, 20 rebounds and five blocks in a 92–74 win against Oklahoma, the first 20-point, 20-rebound game in program history. On February 16, she matched her season-high of 24 points while recording 13 rebounds, four blocks and three steals in an 87–85 win against Oklahoma. As a freshman, Lee averaged 15.7 points, 11.4 rebounds and 3.1 blocks per game, earning first-team All-Big 12 and Freshman of the Year recognition. She set the conference record by winning the Big 12 Freshman of the Week award 12 times. On January 31, 2021, Lee posted a sophomore season-high 37 points and 18 rebounds in an 80–70 loss to Oklahoma, scoring the most points by a Kansas State player during a Big 12 game. She averaged 19.1 points, 8.7 rebounds and two blocks per game as a sophomore and was named first-team All-Big 12 for a second time.

In her junior season debut on November 9, 2021, Lee broke the program single-game scoring record with 43 points, nine rebounds, four blocks and three steals in a 103–40 victory over Central Arkansas. On December 11, Lee posted 38 points, 14 rebounds and six blocks in a 79–73 win against South Dakota State. On January 11, 2022, she had 38 points and 11 rebounds in a 73–70 loss to Iowa State. On January 23, Lee set the NCAA Division I women's single-game scoring record with 61 points in a 94–65 win over Oklahoma. During the game, she also had 12 rebounds and three blocks. As a junior, Lee averaged 22 points, 10.3 rebounds and 2.9 blocks per game. She earned her third consecutive first-team All-Big 12 selection and was named a second-team All-American by the Associated Press and the United States Basketball Writers Association. Lee opted to return to Kansas State instead of entering the 2022 WNBA draft but was sidelined for the season after undergoing knee surgery.

== Career statistics ==
Legend
GP	Games played	GS	Games started	MPG	Minutes per game	RPG	Rebounds per game
APG	Assists per game	SPG	Steals per game	BPG	Blocks per game	PPG	Points per game
TO	Turnovers per game	FG%	Field-goal percentage	3P%	3-point field-goal percentage	FT%	Free-throw percentage
**Bold**	Career best	°	League leader

=== College ===
Year	Team	GP	GS	MPG	FG%	3P%	FT%	RPG	APG	SPG	BPG	TO	PPG
2018–19	Kansas State	Redshirt											
2019–20	Kansas State	29	29	**32.0**	.568	–	.704	**11.4**	.4	.8	**3.1**	1.6	15.7
2020–21	Kansas State	25	25	28.0	.621	–	**.812**	8.7	.7	.7	2.0	1.4	19.1
2021–22	Kansas State	**33**	**33**	31.1	.563	–	.771	10.3	.7	**1.2**	2.9	1.5	**22.0**
2022–23	Kansas State	Did not play due to injury											
2023–24	Kansas State	27	27	27.2	.619	**1.000**	.703	8.6	**.8**	1.0	2.8	1.3	19.7
2024–25	Kansas State	22	22	19.3	**.631**	–	.672	6.5	.4	.7	2.1	**1.0**	15.4
**Career**		136	136	28.0	.594	1.000	.742	9.3	.6	.9	2.6	1.4	18.6

== Personal life ==
Lee's younger brother, Ahjany, played college basketball for St. Thomas (Minnesota)and now plays for Houston Christian University (Texas), and her older brother, Ahymad, played at Byron High School. She graduated from Kansas State University with a bachelor's degree in psychology and is pursuing a master's degree in couples and family therapy. Lee was named a second-team Academic All-American by the College Sports Information Directors of America (CoSIDA) as a sophomore. She earned first-team Academic All-American and Big 12 Scholar-Athlete of the Year honors in her junior year.
