= Bloomington Kennedy High School =

Public high school in Bloomington, Minnesota

John F. Kennedy High School
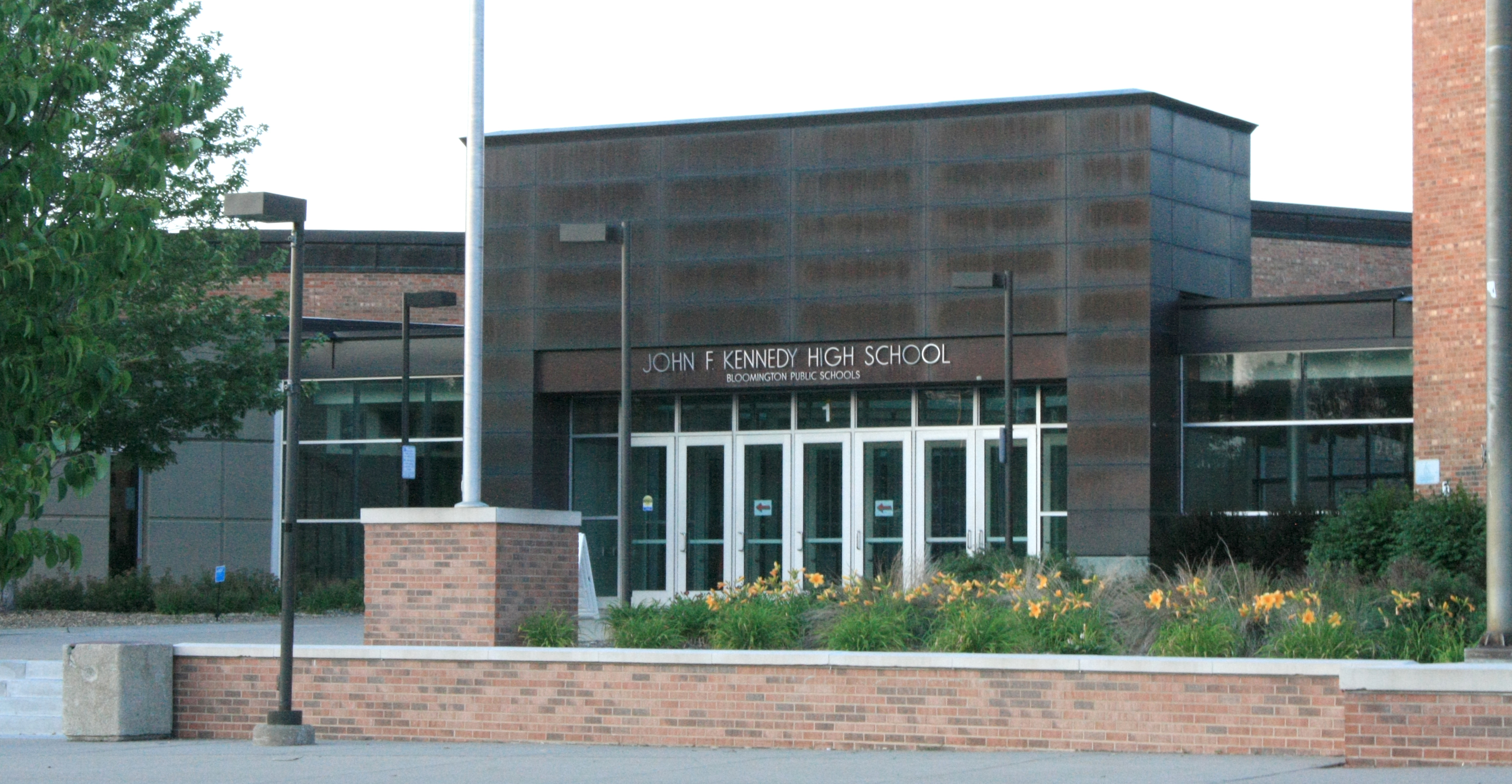

Location
- 9701 Nicollet Avenue; Bloomington, Minnesota 55420; United States; 44°49′39″N 93°16′37″W

Information
- School type: Public, High school
- Established: 1965; 61 years ago
- Principal: Molly Hollenbeck
- Teaching staff: 89.32 (FTE)
- Grades: 9–12
- Enrollment: 1,610 (2023-2024)
- Student to teacher ratio: 18.03
- Campus: Small urban
- Colors: Navy Blue; Gold; White
- Nickname: Eagles
- Website: https://www.bloomington.k12.mn.us/khs

John F. Kennedy High School is one of two public high schools located in Bloomington, Minnesota, United States. Named after former president John F. Kennedy, it was opened in 1965 due to the rapid growth of Bloomington at the time.

== Athletics ==
The school had been a member of the Lake Conference since the school opened but left the Lake Conference after the 2009–10 school year to become part of the new South Suburban Conference. In 2014, Kennedy joined the new Metro West Conference. In 2022, Kennedy joined the Tri-Metro Conference.

Athletics
Season	Sport
Fall	Soccer
Fall	Tennis, Girls
Fall	Cross Country Running
Fall	Football
Fall	Volleyball
Fall	Swimming, Girls
Winter	Dance
Winter	Hockey
Winter	Basketball
Winter	Nordic Skiing
Winter	Alpine Skiing
Winter	Wrestling
Spring	Baseball
Spring	Softball
Spring	Tennis, Boys
Spring	Lacrosse

== Performing arts ==
Kennedy has two competitive show choirs, the mixed-gender "Rhythm in Gold", and the intermediate treble group "East Side Rhythm", which debuted during the 2022 competitive season under the name "Blue and Gold Velvet". The program also hosts an annual competition. It also has a large instrumental music department, split into Band and Orchestra. The Band also plays at some sports games.

== Notable alumni ==
- Patrick Casey - writer, actor, director and author
- Peter Docter, film director, animator, screenwriter, producer, voice actor and CCO of Pixar
- Lisa Demuth, first black woman speaker of the Minnesota House of Representatives
- Kent Hrbek, Major League Baseball player
- Don Jackson, National Hockey League player and coach
- Marcus LeVesseur, professional fighter in the UFC
- Pat Mazorol, Minnesota state representative
- Jason Metsa, politician
- Josh "Worm" Miller - filmmaker, writer, director, and actor
- Gordy Morgan, Olympic wrestler
- John Morgan, Olympic wrestler
- Marty Morgan, NCAA All-American wrestler
- Steve Rushin, writer
- Jenna Smith, college and professional basketball player
- Ryan Stoa, professional ice hockey player
- Melissa Halvorson Wiklund, Minnesota state senator

== See also ==
- Bloomington Jefferson High School
- Bloomington Lincoln High School
