= Frank Ragnow =

American football player (born 1996)

No. 77
- Position: Center

Personal information
- Born: May 17, 1996 (age 30); Victoria, Minnesota, U.S.
- Listed height: 6 ft 5 in (1.96 m)
- Listed weight: 311 lb (141 kg)

Career information
- High school: Chanhassen (Chanhassen, Minnesota)
- College: Arkansas (2014–2017)
- NFL draft: 2018: 1st round, 20th overall pick

Career history
- Detroit Lions (2018–2024)

Awards and highlights
- 3× Second-team All-Pro (2020, 2023, 2024); 4× Pro Bowl (2020, 2022–2024); 2× First-team All-American (2016, 2017); 2× First-team All-SEC (2016, 2017); SEC All-Freshman Team (2014)

Career NFL statistics
- Games played: 96
- Games started: 96
- Stats at Pro Football Reference

Frank William Ragnow (born May 17, 1996) is an American former professional football player who played as a center in the National Football League (NFL) for 7 seasons with the Detroit Lions. He played college football for the Arkansas Razorbacks, where he was a two-time All-American. Ragnow was selected by the Lions in the first round of the 2018 NFL draft, and has earned four Pro Bowl selections and three second-team All-Pro selections with the team. After initially retiring from football in June 2025, Ragnow attempted to come out of retirement in November of the same year to rejoin the Lions midway through the 2025 season, but failed a physical exam and did not join the team.

== Early life ==
Ragnow attended Chanhassen High School in Chanhassen, Minnesota. He was rated as the 24th-best offensive tackle in the nation and the No. 3 prospect from Minnesota as a senior. ESPN evaluated him as a four-star athlete. Ragnow ultimately committed to play for the University of Arkansas after receiving offers from schools such as Wisconsin, Vanderbilt, Minnesota, Ohio State, and Florida State. He was also on the track & field team throwing the shot put 57 ft 6 1/4 in (17.532 m) in the Class AA State Finals, finishing in second place.

== College career ==
Ragnow was recruited to Arkansas by then-head coach Bret Bielema and offensive line coach Sam Pittman. Ragnow participated in nine of Arkansas' twelve games as a freshman in 2014, playing at center. He helped Arkansas finish the season 7-6 and beat Texas in the 2014 Texas Bowl. He played a role in Arkansas' spot atop the SEC in sacks allowed, giving up 0 sacks individually. As a sophomore in 2015, Ragnow started all thirteen of the Razorbacks' games as a right guard, allowing no sacks in the season's last seven games. He helped Arkansas to an 8-5 record and a victory over Kansas State in the 2016 Liberty Bowl. As a junior in 2016, Ragnow started 12 games as the Hogs' center and the other as the right guard, playing more than 900 snaps. He was named 1st Team All-SEC and an All-American. Arkansas finished the season 7-6 after a loss to Virginia Tech in the 2016 Belk Bowl. Ragnow was the starting center as a senior in 2017, and was once again 1st Team All-SEC and an All-American. He finished his career at Arkansas never allowing a single sack, and is considered one of the best offensive linemen in school history.

== Professional career ==
External videos
- Frank Ragnow NFL Combine Interview

Pre-draft measurables
Height	Weight	Arm length	Hand span	40-yard dash	10-yard split	20-yard split	20-yard shuttle	Three-cone drill	Vertical jump	Broad jump	Bench press
6 ft 5 1/8 in (1.96 m)	312 lb (142 kg)	33 1/8 in (0.84 m)	9 3/8 in (0.24 m)	4.99 s	1.74 s	2.91 s	4.51 s	8.04 s	33 1/2 in (0.85 m)	9 ft 7 in (2.92 m)	27 reps
All values from NFL Combine /Arkansas' Pro Day

The Detroit Lions selected Ragnow in the first round (20th overall) of the 2018 NFL draft. Ragnow was the first center drafted in 2018 and was the second interior lineman drafted. Ragnow became the highest drafted center from Arkansas, surpassing Steve Korte who was selected 38th overall during the 1983 NFL draft. On May 12, 2018, the Lions signed Ragnow to a four-year, $11.78 million contract that includes $9.21 million guaranteed and a signing bonus of $6.64 million.

External videos
- Lions draft Frank Ragnow 20th overall
- Instant Draft Grade: Frank Ragnow

The Lions immediately moved Ragnow to offensive guard although he had been used chiefly as a center during his collegiate career. The Lions had Graham Glasgow slated to be the starting center after the departure of Travis Swanson. Head coach Matt Patricia named Ragnow the starting left guard to begin the regular season. He started alongside offensive tackles Taylor Decker, Rick Wagner, right guard T. J. Lang, and center Graham Glasgow.

He made his professional regular season debut and first career start during the Lions' season-opening 48–17 loss to the New York Jets. He finished the season starting all 16 games at left guard. On December 21, 2020, he was named to the 2021 Pro Bowl.

On April 28, 2021, the Lions exercised the fifth-year option on Ragnow's contract. He signed a four-year contract extension worth $54 million with the Lions on May 7.

On October 6, 2021, Ragnow was placed on injured reserve with a toe injury. He started in four games on the year.

In the 2022 season, Ragnow started in 16 games. In the 2023 season, Ragnow started in 15 regular season games and all three of the Lions' postseason games. In the 2024 season, Ragnow started in 16 regular season games and the Lions' one postseason game.

On June 2, 2025, Ragnow posted a farewell post onto his Instagram which announced his retirement after seven seasons in the NFL.

On November 26, 2025, Ragnow announced that he was coming out of retirement to rejoin the Lions. Three days later, however, Ragnow failed his physical exam after being diagnosed with a Grade 3 hamstring strain, which would keep him from participating in the remainder of the season, halting his return.
