= Aitkin High School =

Coordinates: 46°32′01.5″N 93°42′40″W

Location
- 306 2nd St. NW; Aitkin, Minnesota; United States

Information
- Type: Public high school
- Motto: We believe everyone can learn and can experience success.
- Established: 1894
- Principal: Lisa DeMars
- Teaching staff: 37.62 (FTE)
- Grades: 7–12
- Enrollment: 509 (2024–2025)
- Student to teacher ratio: 13.53
- Colors: Red, black, and white
- Mascot: Gobblers
- Website: home.isd1.org/high-school.html

Aitkin High School (AHS) is a public high school in Aitkin, Minnesota, United States. The school serves students in grades 7–12. The school enrolls approximately 600 students per year, with 400 students in the high school and 200 attending middle school. The school is a combined middle and high school, since the town does not have the needed population of adolescents to include a separate middle school. Class sizes are around 100 students, while some classes, such as the Class of 1978, have enrolled up to 160 students at one time. The Class of 2010 is one of the smallest Aitkin High School classes in history, with a class size at graduation of 83. The class entered with 96 students in 2004. Though the more recent class of 2020 graduated with less than 70.

The school is a member of Minnesota's Independent School District 1 (Aitkin School District), and is affiliated with the Minnesota State High School League (MSHSL). The school is a member of the Mid-State Conference. The AHS mascot is the Gobbler.

== History ==
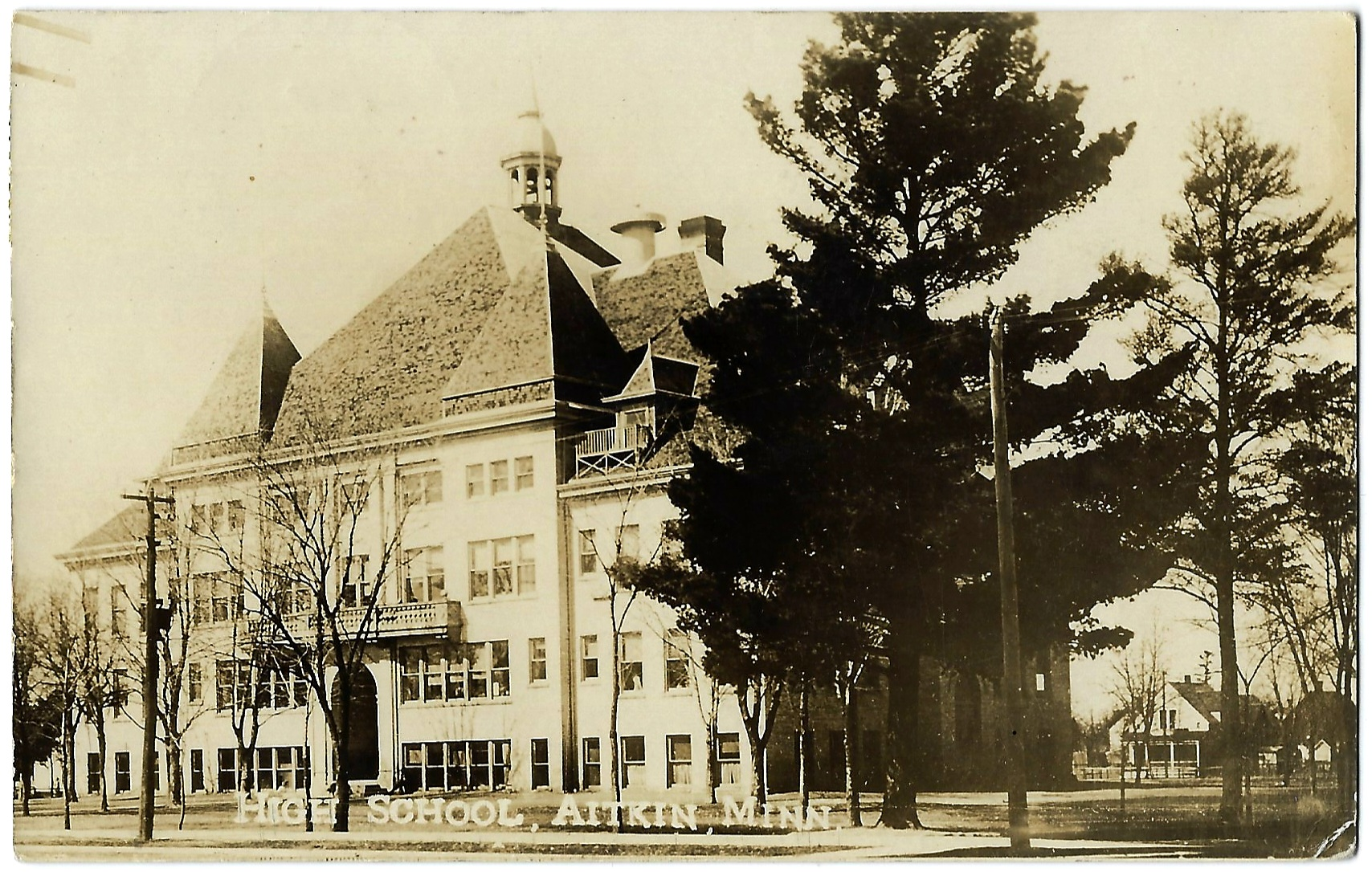
Aitkin High School, 1914 Aitkin, Minnesota

Aitkin High School was established in the year 1894 and the oldest school building was completed in 1901. Many additions have been added to the school since. When the school was first built, many children that lived outside the city of Aitkin attended local country schools, and then attended AHS after they graduated from 8th grade. At that time, Aitkin High School served grades 9–12 only. A west wing was added in the 1950s. In 1976, the west wing building was remodeled and the old school building was demolished. An auditorium built in 1941 was remodeled in 1994. In 2024, the auditorium was renamed the "Bryan Johnson Auditorium" as a dedication to the music teacher/choral director Bryan "BJ" Johnson who had a tenure of 40 years from 1967-2007. The old gymnasium was remodeled and also renamed the "Noel Bailey Gymnasium" in 2024 as a dedication to the long term wrestling coach, former school board member and teacher Noel Bailey.

Gobblers, Aitkin High School mascot

In late 2014 to early 2015, plans for remodeling the high school were considered once again but were voted down in a county wide election in 2015. Alternative plans continued and are still continuing to be contemplated from minor remodeling projects to building a brand new school building. After years of debate, the first phase of major remodeling of the high school took place during the summer of 2018, which involves creation of a new special education area as well as relocation of classrooms and modifications to the library/media center. Later phases of the renovation included a redesign and modernization of the cafeteria/commons area.

On September 11, 2015, the Aitkin football field was named "Veterans Field" in honor of local veterans with a dedication ceremony proceeding the football game. New bleachers were added in the new gym as well as some other minor modifications.

== School ==
The Aitkin School District's Superintendent is Dan Stifter. Stifter was a former Social Studies teacher in Aitkin. The high school principal is Lisa DeMars.

More than 110 classes are offered. This includes subjects in agriculture, business, media arts, computer science and information technology, English, family and consumer science, art, music, physical education, industrial technology, mathematics, science, social studies, and World Languages.

Although AHS does not offer any AP or IB classes, it offers college credit for advanced classes with a program called College in the Schools through the University of Minnesota, Central Lakes Community College, Mesabi Community College, and Vermilion Community College and the option of PSEO. These enable students to receive college credits at select colleges free of tuition and book and may even obtain enough credits to get an Associate of Arts Degree.

== Facilities ==
The school features a commons area, two gyms, a band area, an auditorium, a library/media center, a Strength room, a choir area, a special education area, and three floors of classrooms and laboratory type classroom for industrial arts, home economics, fine arts, and agriculture.

== Athletics ==
Athletic teams include:

- Fall
  - Football
  - Girls' Tennis
  - Volleyball
  - Boys Cross Country
- Winter
  - Boys' Basketball
  - Girls' Basketball
  - Wrestling
  - Dance team
  - Hockey
- Spring
  - Boys' Tennis
  - Softball
  - Baseball
  - Golf
  - Track and field
  - Clay target

== See also ==
- List of high schools in Minnesota
