= South Suburban Conference (Minnesota) =

Public school association

- Classification: MSHSL
- Founded: 2010
- No. of teams: 10
- Region: Minnesota

\

The South Suburban Conference is a Minnesota State High School League conference in Minnesota. It was started officially on July 1, 2010, when 9 schools from the Lake Conference and one from the Missota Conference left their respective conferences to create the South Suburban. They offer 30 different interscholastic sports and 14 fine arts activities. After the 2013-14 school year, Bloomington Jefferson and Bloomington Kennedy left the conference to the newly formed Metro West Conference for a better balance of enrollment. Farmington Senior High School and Shakopee High School joined from the Missota Conference that same year.

== Current members ==
Institution	Location (Population)	Founded	Joined	Affiliation	Enrollment	Nickname	Color(s)
Apple Valley	Apple Valley, Minnesota (55,638)	1976	2010	Public	1,919	Eagles	Brown, Gold, White
Burnsville	Burnsville, Minnesota (63,943)	1957	2010	Public	2,534	Blaze	Black and Gold
Eagan	Eagan, Minnesota (68,943)	1989	2010	Public	2,202	Wildcats	Royal Blue, Kelly Green, Silver
Eastview	Apple Valley, Minnesota (55,638)	1997	2010	Public	2,312	Lightning	Black, Blue, Silver
Farmington	Farmington, Minnesota (23,534)	1976	2014	Public	2,196	Tigers	Black, Orange, White
Lakeville North	Lakeville, Minnesota (72,812)	1906	2010	Public	1,871	Panthers	Red, Black, White
Lakeville South	Lakeville, Minnesota (72,812)	2005	2010	Public	1,816	Cougars	Cardinal Red, Vegas Gold, Black
Prior Lake	Prior Lake, Minnesota (28,133)	1968	2010	Public	2,854	Lakers	Navy Blue, Gold
Rosemount	Rosemount, Minnesota (26,642)	1918	2010	Public	2,380	Irish	Navy Blue, Irish Green, Gold
Shakopee	Shakopee, Minnesota (48,401)	2007	2014	Public	2,813	Sabers	Red, White, Black
