= Sebeka High School =

Location
- 200 1st Street NW; Sebeka, Minnesota 56477; United States; 46°37′53″N 95°5′28″W

Information
- Type: Public
- Established: 1893
- School district: ISD 820
- Dean: Jill Walter
- Principal: David Fjeldheim
- Staff: 17.13 (FTE)
- Grades: 7–12
- Student to teacher ratio: 13.60
- Colors: Purple and gold
- Mascot: Trojans
- Website: www.sebeka.k12.mn.us

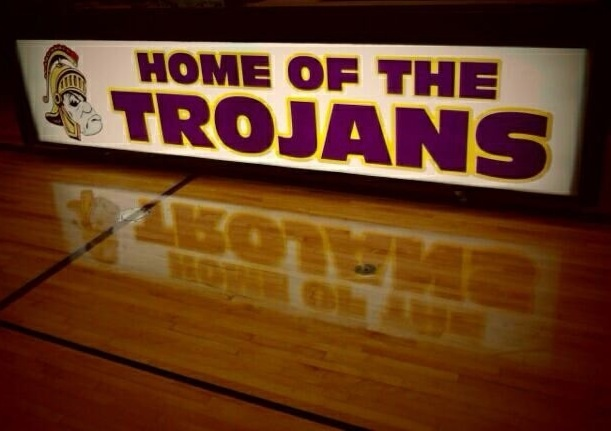
Signage in the new gymnasium

Sebeka High School is a public high school in Sebeka, Minnesota, United States serving grades 7–12. The high school is part of Sebeka Public School (Independent School District 820), and is contained within the same building as the elementary school. Sebeka's mascot is the Trojan.

In addition to Sebeka, the school also serves the community of Nimrod.

== Academics ==
Sebeka High School operates on an 8:17 am to 3:09 pm schedule. This includes 7 class periods and a break for lunch. The school offers two Advanced Placement courses: AP U.S. History and AP Calculus.

== Extracurricular activities ==
=== Sports ===
Sebeka High School currently offers eleven sports, seven for boys (baseball, basketball, cross country, football, golf, track and field, and wrestling) and seven for girls (basketball, cheerleading, cross country, golf, softball, track and field, and volleyball). In many of these sports (cross country, football, wrestling, track and field, golf, and cheerleading), Sebeka is in a cooperative with Menahga High School known as United North Central (UNC). The colors of the combined teams are black and gold, and they are known as the Warriors.

The Trojans' boys basketball team made its first ever trip to the state tournament in 2009. The team returned to the state tournament in 2010, and lost to Minnesota Transitions in the state championship game, 61–52. Three of the Trojans' five starters (Joey Cuperus, John Clark, and Alex Brockpahler) were named to the All-Tournament team.

The Trojans' baseball team also advanced to the state tournament in 2010, the team's third such appearance. Sebeka advanced to the Class A title game for the first time in school history before losing to Eden Valley-Watkins, 7-4.

=== Organizations and academic competitions ===
Sebeka High School students are also involved in a variety of extracurricular organizations and activities, including FFA, BPA, NHS, FCCLA, Knowledge Bowl, Speech, and the one-act play. In 2008, Sebeka's Knowledge Bowl team placed 3rd in the Class A state meet, while the team earned a 5th-place finish in 2009. The team came back to state in 2010 and won the Class A Tournament, scoring 162.5 points in the process. Sebeka also won the state meet in 2011.

=== Music ===
==== Band ====
Sebeka High School's Concert Band is currently directed by Mr. David Kerkvliet, who has held this position for 11 years. The band has received "Superior" ratings (the highest available ranking) at contest for 14 years in a row.

==== Choir ====
Sebeka High School's choir is directed by Mrs. Melissa Koch. In 2010, the choir received three "Superior" ratings from the three judges at contest.

== Notable alumni ==
- Dick Stigman, a Major League Baseball player.
- Carrie Lee, who won the Miss Minnesota competition and was a Miss USA Competitor in 2005.
