= Rosemount High School =

Location
- 3335 142nd Street West; Rosemount, Minnesota 55068-4006; United States; 44°44′41″N 93°07′57″W

Information
- Type: Public
- Motto: Pride in the Past; Performance in the Present; Promise in the Future
- Established: 1918
- School district: Independent School District 196
- CEEB code: 242125
- Principal: Peter Roback
- Teaching staff: 125.04 (FTE)
- Enrollment: 2,380 (2023-2024)
- Student to teacher ratio: 19.03
- Schedule type: 7 daily periods
- Schedule: Trimesters
- Campus: Suburban
- Campus size: 71 acres (29 ha)
- Colors: Navy blue & gold
- Athletics conference: South Suburban Conference
- Nickname: Irish
- Newspaper: Irish Gazette
- Yearbook: Rohian
- Feeder schools: Rosemount Middle School, Scott Highlands Middle School
- Website: rhs.district196.org

Rosemount High School is a public four-year high school in Rosemount, Minnesota, United States, founded in 1918. The school is one of four four-year high schools in Independent School District 196 (Rosemount-Apple Valley-Eagan School District). The school competes in the South Suburban Conference of the Minnesota State High School League (MSHSL).

Rosemount High School was founded in 1918. Many alumni's children also attend Rosemount High school. The school has a "triple-A" philosophy of academics, arts and athletics. Rosemount offers a comprehensive curriculum and multiple dual enrollment opportunities where students can earn college credit.

Rosemount High School has state and nationally recognized band, choir, and dance programs; numerous individual and team state champions in athletics; and a variety of clubs and activities.

It is located on a 71-acre (29 ha) campus in a growing suburban city of the Minneapolis–St. Paul metropolitan area with academic, artistic, and athletic facilities. Rosemount High School is located within a short walking distance of Rosemount Elementary School and Rosemount Middle School, two of its feeder schools, as well as along Minnesota Highway 3, which places the school near the downtown area of the city.

== Academics ==
=== Curriculum ===
Through the Minnesota state Post Secondary Enrollment Options (PSEO) program, students are eligible to take classes at state colleges and universities.

=== College and other post-graduation plans ===
Consistently, over 90% of Rosemount High School students graduate, with 93.2% graduating in 2021—surpassing the state average.

== Arts, athletics, and activities ==
=== Arts ===
Rosemount High School has an arts program including visual arts, instrumental music, vocal music, dance, theater, film production, and other modes of performance. The school's band program is also the largest high school program in the State of Minnesota. Additionally, students can participate in jazz band, pit orchestra, cocurricular choirs, dance company, and National Art Honor Society. The 2016 musical production of Legally Blonde was honored in Hennepin Theatre Trust's Spotlight Musical Theatre Program.

The Rosemount Marching Band, sometimes nicknamed "the pride of Rosemount," performed in the 2014 and 2023 Rose Parade in Pasadena, California, on New Year's Day. In 2017, it performed at the Macy's Thanksgiving Day Parade with nearly 300 students. The marching band has won the Youth in Music Minnesota state championship 14 times in the past 16 years and has remained competitive in Bands of America Super Regionals competitions.

=== Athletics ===
Rosemount is a charter member of the South Suburban Conference, which was started in 2010. They joined after deciding to leave the Lake Conference, which later became the Classic Lake Conference. Rosemount High School currently has 30 sports teams, most of which include teams for non–varsity-level athletes, in addition to several intramural and community teams. In recent years, many Irish teams have found competitive success including numerous conference titles and state tournament runs. Students can also join athletic teams at the district level, such as alpine and Nordic skiing, as well as adapted soccer and field hockey.

== Faculty and staff ==
Rosemount High School employs 122 teachers among its 200 staff.

Rosemount High School has seven guidance counselors who assist students with academics, career planning, college admissions, and social/emotional matters, in addition to various other student support staff. The counseling department offers wide-ranging services to help students succeed during and after high school, including presentations on grade-specific issues of importance, an ACT prep class, digital tools for college and career planning, a summer college application boot camp, an annual college planning workshop, and consideration for local scholarships.

== Demographics ==
The demographic breakdown of the 2,532 students enrolled for the 2022–23 academic year was:

- Hispanic or Latino - 7.1%
- American Indian or Alaska Native - 0.2%
- Black or African American - 8.8%
- Asian - 5.8%
- White - 71.5%
- Two or more races - 6.5%

In addition, 9.7% of the students were eligible for free or reduced lunches.

== Notable people ==
=== Faculty ===
- Craig Kusick, Former major league baseball player, former baseball coach and physical education teacher
- Bob Sadek, Former University of Minnesota quarterback and physical education teacher

=== Alumni ===
- Robert M. Boche, Wisconsin State Assemblyman
- JT Brown, professional hockey player, Tampa Bay Lightning right wing (2008)
- Tom Compton, offensive lineman, Chicago Bears, Washington Redskins, Atlanta Falcons including participation in Super Bowl LI, and Minnesota Vikings as of 2018
- Pat Garofalo, Minnesota State Representative (1989)
- Matt Little, former Minnesota State Senator (2003)
- Payton Otterdahl, Olympic shot putter (2014)
- Tom Preissing, professional hockey player, Colorado Avalanche (1997)
- Mike Richman, MMA fighter for Bellator (2003)
- Lona Williams, producer of films including Drop Dead Gorgeous (1985)
