= Esko High School =

Location
- Esko, Minnesota; United States; 46.7065°N 92.3622°W

Information
- Type: Public
- Principal: Brian Wickenheiser
- Grades: 7-12
- Enrollment: 624
- Student to teacher ratio: 20:1

Esko High School is an American high school in Esko, Carlton County, Minnesota. The school is also known as Esko’s Lincoln High School or Lincoln Secondary School.

== Enrollment ==
As the only high school in the Esko Public School District, Esko’s Lincoln Secondary School enrolls 624 students in grades 7-12, and has a 20:1 student to teacher ratio.

== Academics ==
71 percent of students at Esko High are proficient in reading and 60 percent are proficient in math. In 2025, Niche.com ranked Esko High #73 of 95 best high schools for STEM subjects in Minnesota, and #151 of 485 for best high schools in Minnesota. The average graduation rate is 95 percent.

== Notable alumni ==
- Koi Perich, football player
- Karson Kuhlman, former NHL player

== Mascot name change ==
In 2023, the Esko school board and Esko High School decided to discontinue the “Eskomos” team name due to it being offensive to some Alaska natives.
