= Blooming Prairie High School =

Location
- 202 4th Avenue Northwest; Blooming Prairie MN 55917
- 43.8680182°N 93.0638099°W

Information
- Type: Public
- Established: 1868
- School district: Blooming Prairie Schools #756
- Principal: John Worke
- Staff: 24.66 (FTE)
- Grades: 7-12
- Student to teacher ratio: 15.41
- Colors: Black, white and silver
- Nickname: Awesome Blossoms
- Website: https://www.blossoms.k12.mn.us/page/2451

Blooming Prairie High School is a Public school located in Blooming Prairie, Minnesota. The high school teaches students in grades 7-12, and has a student body of approximately 350, with a student-teacher ratio of 12:1.

== School system ==
The Blooming Prairie Public School System consists of Blooming Prairie Elementary School and Blooming Prairie High School. The school district consists of a combined student body of approximately 950, with a student-teacher ratio of 14:1. The Minnesota state average is a 16:1.

== Athletics ==
The High School has a comprehensive, year-round, gender-balanced sports program. This includes football, volleyball, cheerleading, and cross-country in the Fall; wrestling and both boys' and girls' basketball in the Winter; and softball (for girls), baseball (for boys), boys' and girls' golf, and boys' and girls' track teams in the Spring. The Blooming Prairie football team was the 2010 conference champion. They also were State champs in 2019.

== School spirit ==
Blooming Prairie High showed its school spirit in March 2011 when it showed support for Jordan Ressler, a junior who died in a motor vehicle accident in November 2010, by displaying the University of Texas logo in a human form and by wearing the distinctive orange clothing of the team he loved.
