= St. Mary's High School (Sleepy Eye, Minnesota) =

St. Mary's Catholic School

Location
- 104 St. Mary's Street NW; Sleepy Eye, Minnesota 56085; United States; 44°18′18″N 94°43′22″W

Information
- Type: Private, Coeducational
- Religious affiliation: Roman Catholic
- Patron saints: St. Mary, Help of Christians
- Established: 1914 / Grade School est. 1883
- Founder: Sisters of St. Francis of Rochester, MN
- School district: Public School District # 84
- Oversight: St. Mary's Help of Christians Catholic Church parish
- Superintendent: Msgr. Eugene Lozinski
- Principal: Mary Gangelhoff, PreK-6; Peter Roufs, 7-12
- Chaplain: Msgr. Eugene Lozinski
- Staff: 15
- Faculty: 25
- Grades: 9–12
- Enrollment: 300
- Average class size: 18
- Hours in school day: 8:00a-3:15p
- Colors: Green and Gold
- Slogan: Forming Faithful Disciples
- Fight song: Washington & Lee Swing
- Athletics conference: Tomahawk
- Mascot: Knights
- Team name: Knights
- Accreditation: MNSAA
- Endowment: supported by the local parish
- Tuition: less than 5k
- Website: www.sesmschool.com

St. Mary's School is a private, Roman Catholic school in Sleepy Eye, Minnesota. It is located in the Diocese of New Ulm.

== Background ==
St. Mary's School was established in 1883. The High School was established in 1914

== Sports ==
St. Mary's High School is a part of the Tomahawk Conference.

Sport	Section Championships	State Championships
Football	1979, 1988, 2011	-
Volleyball	-	-
Boys' Basketball	1998, 2005, 2006	-2021,2022
Girls' Basketball	1999, 2005	-
Baseball	1979, 1980, 2001, 2002, 2003, 2004, 2006, 2007	2002, 2004, 2006, 2007
Softball	1981, 1982, 1983, 1984, 2007	1984
