= Leroy-Ostrander High School =

Public high school in Minnesota

Coordinates: 43°30′48″N 92°30′35″W

LeRoy-Ostrander High School

Location
- 406 West Main Street; LeRoy, (Mower County), Minnesota 55951; United States

Information
- Other name: L-O
- Type: Public high school
- Principal: Aaron Hungerholt
- Staff: 10.89 (FTE)
- Enrollment: 138 (2022-23)
- Student to teacher ratio: 12.67
- Colors: Red and white
- Athletics conference: Southeast Conference
- Nickname: Cardinals

LeRoy-Ostrander High School is a high school in southeastern Minnesota located in the town of Le Roy, Minnesota in the United States. LeRoy-Ostrander serves 305 students K-12. Aaron Hungerholt is the principal.
