= Kasson-Mantorville High School =

Coordinates: 44.0451°N 92.7466°W

Location
- 101 16th Street NE; Kasson, Minnesota 55944; United States

Information
- School type: Public, high school
- Motto: Commitment to Excellence
- Founded: 1956
- School board: Kasson-Mantorville School Board
- Superintendent: Beth Giese
- School number: 204
- Principal: Trent Langemo
- Teaching staff: 35.80 (FTE)
- Grades: 9–12
- Enrollment: 672 (2023-2024)
- Student to teacher ratio: 18.77
- Language: English
- Colors: Royal Blue and White
- Team name: KoMets
- Affiliation: Hiawatha Valley League
- Website: https://www.kassonmh.new.rschooltoday.com/

Kasson-Mantorville High School (KMHS) is a high school located in Kasson, Minnesota, United States, that serves students from both Kasson and neighboring Mantorville. It is the only high school in Minnesota School District #204, and it is the home of the Kasson-Mantorville "KoMets", whose school colors are royal blue and white. The school's song is "KM Fight" and is sung to the tune "Washington and Lee Swing".

Extracurricular Activities KMHS belongs to the Hiawatha Valley League Conference for all sports except football. For football, KMHS belongs to the Southern Football Alliance-Red Division. KMHS belongs to the Minnesota State High School League for tournament play.

KMHS participates in most sports offered by the Hiawatha Valley League: baseball, boys' and girls' basketball, dance team, football, golf, ice hockey, boys' and girls' soccer, softball, track and field, girls' volleyball, and wrestling.

KMHS offers band, choir, knowledge bowl, robotics, drama and cheerleading programs.

The drama program produces one fall musical, a one-act winter play, and one spring play.

== Building ==
KM High School is one of three buildings within the KM campus which also includes a middle school and elementary school with a community education wing. In the fall of 2017 a community approved expansion was completed that added a magnificent commons area, new classrooms for S.T.E.M. education, vocation tech, agriculture, industrial tech, music and consumer sciences. Also a new auditorium, media center, kitchen and cafeteria and a Safe and Secure entrance. .

KH HS was previously the largest school in the area in which the middle and high schools shared a building. The middle school section, which held grades 7 and 8, had a capacity of approximately 300 students. The high school, grades 9–12, held approximately 600. The middle and high school programs also shared certain areas, such as art and FACS. The building is now used solely for high school classes. A new middle school building for grades 5–8 opened for classes in September 2009.

The building contains two separate gymnasiums.
