= Dilworth-Glyndon-Felton High School =

Public high school in Glyndon, Minnesota

Location
- 513 Parke Ave S, Glyndon, MN 56547; Glyndon, Clay County, Minnesota 56547; United States
- Coordinates: 46°52′17″N 96°34′53″W

Information
- Other name: DGF High School
- School type: Public High School
- School district: Dilworth-Glyndon-Felton Independent School District
- NCES District ID: 2710260
- Superintendent: Shannon Hunstad
- School code: ISD 2164
- NCES School ID: 271026000642
- Principal: Joe O'Keefe
- Grades: 9-12
- Student to teacher ratio: 16:1
- Language: English
- Color
- Fight song: The Victors
- Athletics conference: Heart O Lakes Conference, Minnesota State High School League
- Mascot: Rebel
- Team name: DGF Rebels
- Website: https://www.dgf.k12.mn.us/schools/dgf-high-school

Dilworth-Glyndon-Felton High School, also known as DGF, is a public high school in Glyndon, Minnesota, United States of America. It is part of the Dilworth-Glyndon-Felton Independent School District, and currently serves around 450 students in grades 9-12.

== History ==
The DGF School District started as three independent schools, in Dilworth, Glyndon, and Felton, respectively. Before being consolidated, Dilworth's mascot was the Locomotive, Glyndon's mascot was the Buffalo, and Felton's mascot was the Tiger.

Around the year 1967, Glyndon and Felton schools were consolidated into one. Their mascot was the Buffalo, and school colors were maroon and white.

Before 1996, Dilworth school was consolidated into Glyndon-Felton school to create Dilworth-Glyndon-Felton school, bringing about the current mascot, the Rebel.

== Extracurricular activities ==
=== Athletics ===
DGF High School is a part of the Minnesota State High School League, and is a member of the Heart O Lakes Conference for all athletics.

The school's athletic mascot is the Rebel.

DGF offers cross country, football, and volleyball in the fall; basketball, dance, and wrestling in the winter; and baseball, golf, softball, and track in the spring.

=== Other activities and clubs ===
Other activities and clubs offered at DGF are Belle Voce Choir, eSports, Fishing League, Knowledge Bowl, Model United Nations, National Honor Society, Pep Band, River Watchers, Robotics, Stage Band, Student Council, Trap Shooting, and Youth in Government.

== Notable faculty ==
- Paul Marquart, Minnesota politician
  - Government class teacher for 35 years, beginning in 1984
  - Wrestling Coach
