= Maple River Senior High School =

Location
- 1318 S Riverfront Dr; Mankato, Minnesota 56001; United States
- Coordinates: 44°09′37″N 94°01′06″E

Information
- Principal: Ted Simon
- Teaching staff: 28.04 (on an FTE basis)
- Grades: 5-12
- Enrollment: 498 (2023-2024)
- Student to teacher ratio: 17.76
- Colors: Blue, green, white and silver
- Nickname: Eagles
- Website: www.isd2135.k12.mn.us/link-3/middle-high-school

Maple River Senior High School is a high school in Mapleton, Minnesota, United States. The school's mascot is an eagle and the school is a member of the Minnesota State High School League.
