= Staples-Motley High School =

Location
- 401 Centennial Drive; Staples, Minnesota 56479; United States
- 46°21′29″N 94°47′49″W

Information
- School type: Public
- School district: Staples-Motley School District
- NCES District ID: 2733900
- Superintendent: Shane Tappe
- NCES School ID: 273390001644
- Principal: Debbie Ferdon
- Grades: 9-12
- Enrollment: 309
- Student to teacher ratio: 16.31
- Colors: Red and White
- Mascot: Cardinal
- Website: https://www.isd2170.org/middleandhigh

Staples-Motley High School (SMHS) is in Minnesota. It is in the Staples-Motley School District. The school is categorized as remote rural and has a 95 percent graduation rate. It is at 401 Centennial Drive.

Cardinals are the school mascot and the school colors are red and white. The school has won 31 state championships and has an athletic hall of fame.

In 2025, about 90 percent of students were white, 4.4 percent hispanic and almost 4 percent "two or more races". Almost 40 percent of students were economically disadvantaged.

== History ==
In 1932, 150 out of 400 students at Staples High School went on strike to protest excessive corporal punishment by faculty members.

Motley High School enrollment declined and by 1993 it had a graduating class of only 8 students. The school was consolidated into Staples High School with Motley High becoming a middle school for grades 6 to 8. In 2021 the school district was planning a referendum for school improvements after a failed 2019 referendum. In 2024 the wrestling team won a state title. In 2024 the school's football team played for a state championship two years after going 0-9.

In 2024 the renovated gym opened. Distance runner Audrey Brownwell was training to become the first Minnesota high school student to win a state championship in four distance running events. Drew Potter is the football coach.

== Alumni ==
- Dick Bremer, sportscaster
- Dallas Sams, state legislator
- Dave Joerger, basketball coach

== See also ==
- List of high schools in Minnesota
- High school boys ice hockey in Minnesota
