= Adrian Middle/High School =

Public school in Minnesota, United States

Coordinates: 43.6321885°N 95.9364082°W

Adrian High School

Location
- 415 Kentucky Ave; Adrian, Minnesota 56110; United States

Information
- Type: public
- School district: Adrian School District (ISD 511)
- Dean: Tim Christiansan
- Staff: 12.06 (FTE)
- Grades: 9–12
- Student to teacher ratio: 12.85
- Colors: Royal Blue and Gold
- Athletics conference: MHSHL Red Rock Class A
- Mascot: Dragon
- Website: www.adrianschool.net

Adrian High School is a public high school located in Adrian, Minnesota, United States, and part of the Adrian School District (ISD #511). Students from grades K–12 are all housed in the same building, with classes for each level being held in different wings of the building. Grades 6–8 are defined as middle school and 9–12 as high school.
