= Chanhassen High School =

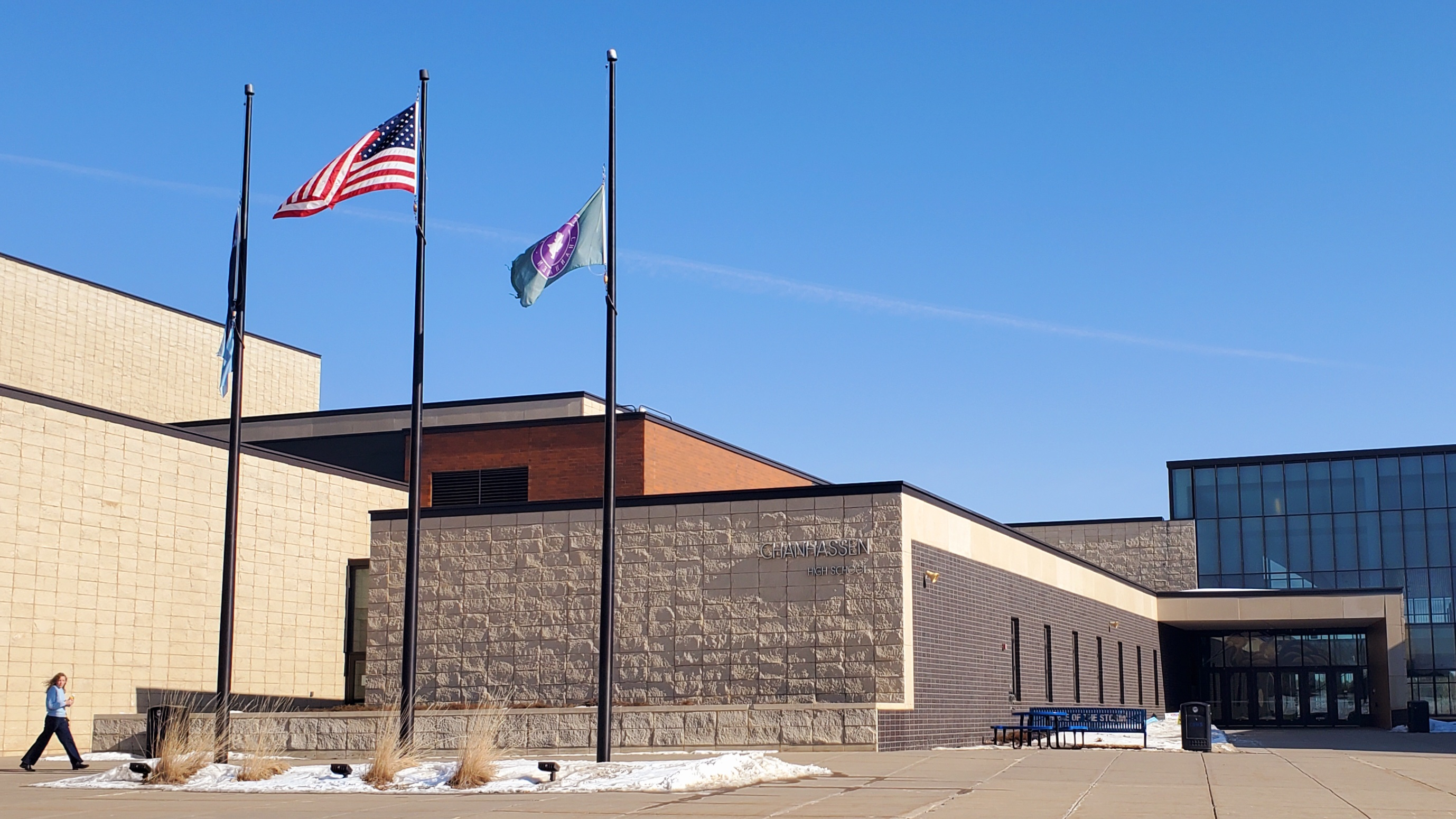

Location
- 2200 Lyman Blvd. Chanhassen, Minnesota 55317; United States
- 44°50′37″N 93°34′47″W

Information
- Type: Public
- Established: 2009
- School district: Eastern Carver County Schools
- Principal: Douglas Bullinger
- Teaching staff: 68.70 (on an FTE basis)
- Grades: 9–12
- Enrollment: 1,383 (2023–2024)
- Student to teacher ratio: 20.13
- Houses: 4 Houses; Pine House, Maple House, Spruce House, and Oak House
- Colors: Navy Blue, Old Gold
- Mascot: Storm
- National ranking: Top 3%
- Yearbook: Tempest
- Website: cns.district112.org

Chanhassen High School (CNHS) is a four-year comprehensive public high school in Chanhassen, Minnesota, United States, a southwestern suburb of Minneapolis. Construction of the school was approved by voters in 2006 in response to rapidly growing enrollment in Carver County and overcrowding at Chaska High School, the district's other high school.

== History ==
As a result of steady population increases in Carver County, Chaska High School's enrollment surpassed its building's designed capacity, with future growth in the school district expected. As a result, voters approved a referendum in 2006 to fund a new high school. Opponents of the bond referendum claimed the district had not looked into other ideas beyond building a new school. During its inaugural year the school did not have a senior class.

== Academics ==
Chanhassen High School students have excelled in academics, ranking in the top 3% of high schools nationwide. The school offers 25 Advanced Placement courses and in 2015 had a Challenge Index of 2.570, which means that more than two AP exams were taken for every member of the most recent graduating class.

The school's administration aims to provide personalized learning, a unique approach to education, remaining small yet continuing to offer college preparatory courses and a comprehensive curriculum. Students choose electives from four areas of interest designed to offer depth in an area of particular relevance for their passions and interests.

These areas of interest include:

- Arts and Communication
- Global Studies
- Health & Social Sciences
- STEM – Science, Technology, Engineering & Math

Within each area, students select a Program of Study to deepen and focus learning in specific paths.

== Athletics ==
Chanhassen athletic teams competed in the Lake Conference of the Minnesota State High School League in the school's first year. They joined the Missota Conference in 2010–2011. As of the 2020–2021 school year, Chanhassen High School competes in the Metro West Conference. In 2015, the baseball team finished the season with a 26-4 record and the Class 3AAA MSHSL state championship. The football team won the 2023 state championship, the school's first state title in football.

== Music ==
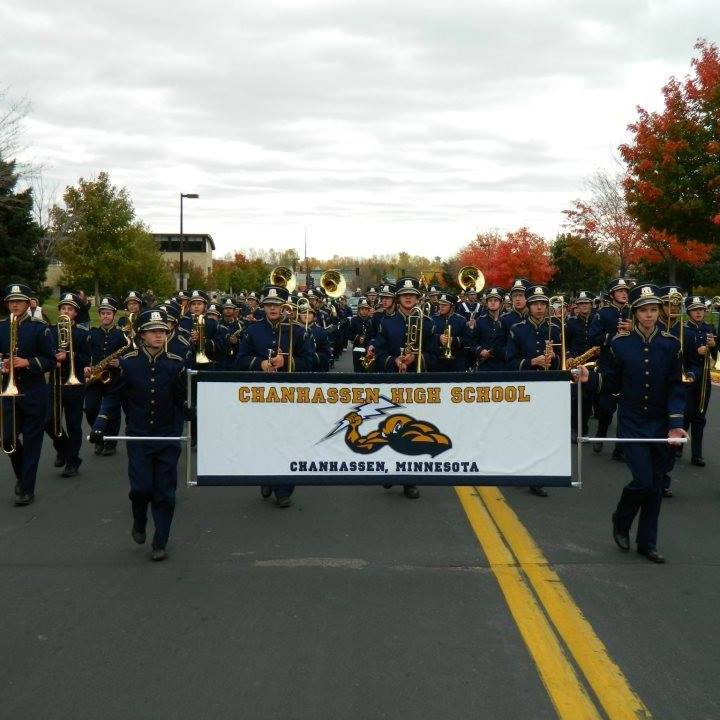
The Chanhassen Marching Band performing at the Chanhassen Fourth of July Parade

Chanhassen has three concert bands—Concert Band, Varsity Band, and Symphonic Winds—two orchestras, and a marching band that has participated in the Chanhassen Homecoming Parade and Steamboat Days Parade in Carver, Minnesota, annually since the school's establishment. Chanhassen also has three jazz bands and a pit orchestra. In February 2016, Chanhassen's top jazz band, Jazz 1, also known as the Monday Night Big Band, performed at the Minnesota Music Educators Association Mid-Winter clinic. In April 2016, the band received a Superior rating and the "Best in Site" award at the Region 2AA Jazz Contest.

Chanhassen High School also has a choral department of over 260 students and eight choirs—Concert Choir, Bel Canto, Vivace, the 9th Grade Women's Chorale, Men's Chorale, Chamber Singers, Vox, and Men Who Sing, known for its non-traditional performances.

== Alternative Learning Program ==
Chanhassen High School used to house Chaska High School's Alternative Learning Program (ALP). This program has since moved to the school district's headquarters. The ALP helps students in need of a different learning environment. ALP students benefit from smaller classes and additional support structures so that guided learning is more available.

== Security ==
In 2013 the Eastern Carver County school district passed a referendum that put $1.8 million toward renovating entryways for security, adding security cameras, creating keyless entries for employees, and installing electronic visitor systems.

== Notable alumni ==
- Frank Ragnow, former NFL player for the Detroit Lions
