= Hill City High School =

Location
- 500 Ione Ave NW; Hill City, Minnesota 55748; United States
- Coordinates: 46°59′34″N 93°36′18″W

Information
- Principal: Adam Johnson
- Teaching staff: 6.44 (FTE)
- Grades: 9-12
- Enrollment: 72 (2024–2025)
- Student to teacher ratio: 11.18
- Colors: Purple & white
- Team name: Hornets
- Website: Hill City School

Hill City High School is a public high school located in Hill City, Minnesota, United States.

== Athletics ==
=== Teams ===
Hill City's athletic teams are nicknamed the Hornets and the school's colors are purple and white. Hill City teams compete in the following sports:

- Football
- Volleyball
- Boys basketball
- Girls basketball
- Baseball
- Softball

== Demographics ==
90% of the student population at Hill City High School identify as Caucasian, 7% identify as American Indian/Alaskan Native, and 2% identify as multiracial. The student body makeup is 52% male and 48% female.
