= Missota Conference =

The Missota Conference was an athletic conference for high schools in the greater Twin Cities area in Minnesota. The league disbanded following the 2013–14 school year.

The conference has had several teams come and go over the years. In the mid-1970s, team members were Burnsville, Rosemount, Lakeville, Prior Lake, Northfield, Farmington and Simley. Burnsville left in 1977 and was replaced by Apple Valley, which split off from Rosemount. New Prague joined in 1979, making it an eight-team conference.

By the mid-1980s, Apple Valley and Rosemount had grown quite a bit bigger than the other schools. Farmington, the smallest team, left the league and Red Wing joined. Since conference by-laws didn't allow schools to kick out a member, the Missota Conference members voted to disband (approximate date 1987). Six of the schools immediately formed a new conference and named it the Missota, without Apple Valley and Rosemount.

Holy Angels and Benilde St. Margaret's joined in the late 1980s to give the conference eight teams again. Shakopee, Chaska and Hutchinson joined in 1990, about the same time that Simley left the league, making it a 10-team conference. Lakeville left in 1993 and Chaska in 1994. Benilde left the league and Farmington rejoined the Missota in the 1997. Richfield joined the league in 1999, but left two years later.

Farmington re-joined the conference for the 1997–98 school year; it had been a member until it joined the Tri-Metro Conference in the mid-1980s.

On January 28, 2009, Hutchinson was accepted into the Wright County Conference, beginning with the fall of 2010. About the same time, Prior Lake announced it was leaving for the new South Suburban Conference, make up mostly of former Lake Conference schools, also effective in the fall of 2010.

On July 15, 2009, Chaska and Chanhassen were admitted to the Missota Conference beginning with the fall of 2010, effectively replacing Hutchinson and Prior Lake. Chanhassen High School is a new school in the East Carver County (Chaska) school district that was opened in the fall of 2009.

During the 2012–13 school year the two biggest schools, Shakopee and Farmington, announced they would be leaving for the South Suburban Conference effective with the fall of 2014. Chaska and Chanhassen later announced that they would be leaving for the new Metro West Conference. The remaining four teams were unable to recruit new partners for the conference and the conference voted to disband after the 2013–14 season. Red Wing and Northfield applied to, and were accepted by the Big 9. New Prague applied to both the Metro West and Big 9 and were denied. They were accepted into the Wright County Conference. Holy Angels will join the Tri-Metro Conference. All of the changes will go into effect for the 2014–15 school year.

== Member schools final four seasons ==
- Academy of Holy Angels (Richfield, Minnesota)
- Chanhassen High School
- Chaska High School
- Farmington High School
- New Prague High School
- Northfield High School
- Red Wing High School
- Shakopee High School

Past members

Burnsville Rosemount Apple Valley Simley Lakeville Benilde-St. Margaret's Richfield Prior Lake Hutchinson
