= Lourdes High School (Rochester, Minnesota) =

Rochester Lourdes High School
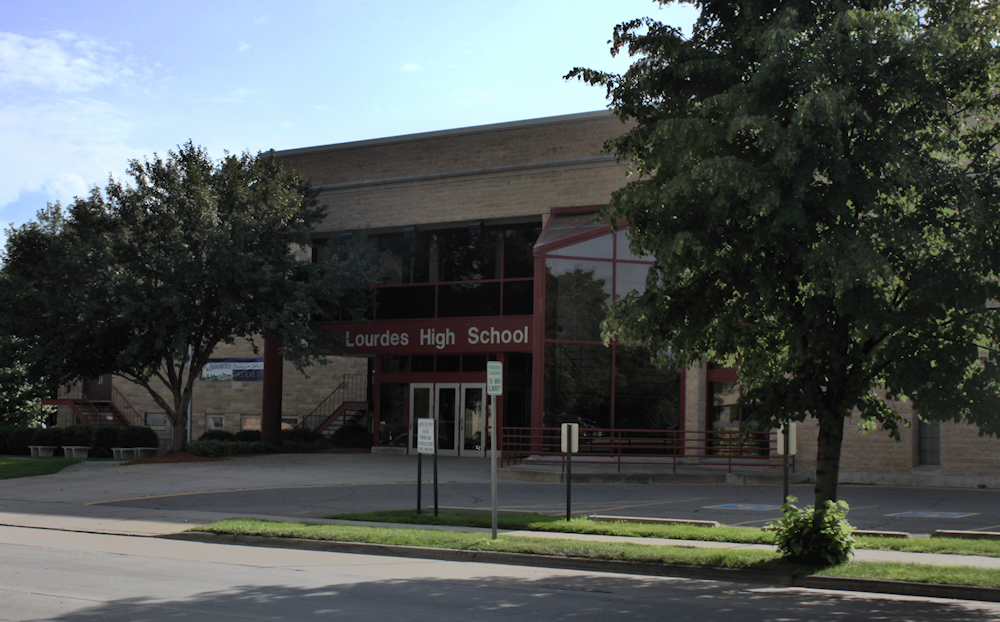

Location
- 2800 19th Street NW; Rochester, Minnesota 55901; United States; 44°02′32.7″N 92°30′14.6″W

Information
- Type: Private
- Religious affiliation: Roman Catholic
- Established: 1877
- Oversight: Roman Catholic Diocese of Winona
- Principal: Mary Spring
- Grades: 9–12
- Gender: Coeducational
- Enrollment: 438 (2009)
- Colors: Purple and Gold
- Athletics conference: Hiawatha Valley
- Team name: Eagles
- Accreditation: North Central Association of Colleges and Schools
- Website: www.rcsmn.org/schools/lourdes-high-school

Lourdes High School is a Catholic high school located in Rochester, Minnesota. It is a part of the Rochester Catholic School system and is located in the Roman Catholic Diocese of Winona.

== Background ==
Lourdes High School (LHS) was initially for girls only and went coeducational in 1925 when nearby boys-only Heffron High School closed. When the school relocated to a location on Center Street in 1941 it was renamed Lourdes High School. It moved to a site near 19th Street and Valley High in 2013.

== Administration ==
Dennis L. Nigon, Principal of Lourdes High School from 1987 to 2007, became President of Rochester Catholic Schools in 2007. Mr. Nigon has 39 years of experience in Catholic high schools, and is in charge of the Lourdes Building Our Future project, to build a new facility for Lourdes High School.

== Academic performance ==
LHS uses modular scheduling, students usually having classes into 36-minute class periods, with each class meeting about four of five days of the school week.

Lourdes High School has additional academic requirements beyond those commonly found at public high schools.

Lourdes students averaged a score of 26 on the ACT examination in the 2006–2007 academic year, meaning that the average Lourdes' student scored higher than 80% of national ACT takers.

== Athletics ==
=== Football ===
In 2006, the Lourdes varsity football team advanced to the semi-finals of the state tournament. The current head coach is Mike Kesler. The first year of Kesler's coaching career was a 2–7 season. But every year since has been a successful winning season making the state tournament three straight years in 06, 07, and 08.

In November 2010, Rochester Lourdes won the Minnesota State Class 3A football title with a convincing 42–13 win over Holy Family. Lourdes finished the season undefeated.

=== Soccer ===
The 2006–2007 season found Lourdes falling to Benilde-St. Margaret's 2–5 in the semi-finals and tying Totino-Grace 1–1 for third place.

=== Ice hockey ===
In the 1960s, Gene Campbell and Ken Johannson were the inaugural coaches for the boys' hockey program.

== Notable alumni ==
- Mark Piepho (1971), former mayor of Skyline, Minnesota
- Johnny Pemberton, actor
- Alyssa Ustby (2020), basketball player
