= MACCRAY High School =

Coordinates: 44.9575000°N 95.3744444°W

- 711 Wolverine Drive; Clara City, MN 56222; United States

Information
- Type: Public
- School district: Maynard-Clara City-Raymond Independent School District (MACCRAY)
- Teaching staff: 28.64 (FTE)
- Grades: Pre–12
- Enrollment: 402 (2023-2024)
- Student to teacher ratio: 14.04
- Color(s)
- Mascot: Wolverine
- Information: (320) 847-2478
- Website: http://www.maccray.k12.mn.us/

MACCRAY High School is a public high school located in Clara City, Minnesota, United States. It is part of the MACCRAY school district, a consolidation between Maynard, Clara City, and Raymond to create one unified school district.

MACCRAY High School was the first school in Minnesota to go to a four-day school week. They started the four-day week at the beginning of the 2008–09 school year with Mondays off. Their Mascot is the Wolverines. The boys' basketball team finished third in the state tournament during the 2010–11 basketball season.
