= Southland High School =

Public school in Minnesota, United States

Location
- 203 2nd St NW; Adams, Minnesota; 55909; United States
- Coordinates: 43°34′7″N 92°43′0″W

Information
- Type: Public
- School district: Southland Public Schools (ISD 500)
- Principal: Scott Hall
- Staff: 7.52 (FTE)
- Grades: 9-12
- Enrollment: 187 (2023-2024)
- Student to teacher ratio: 24.87
- Campus size: small
- Colors: Red, White, and Blue
- Athletics: Volleyball, Football, Dance, Basketball, Wrestling, Baseball, Track, and Golf
- Athletics conference: South Eastern Conference (SEC)
- Mascot: Rebel
- Website: www.isd500.k12.mn.us

Southland High School is a public high school with students in grades nine through twelve. The school is located in Adams, Minnesota, United States, and is part of the Southland Public Schools school district (ISD #500). The school's athletics mascot is the "Rebel".
