= Metro West Conference =

High school sports group in Minnesota, US

- Sports fielded: Various high school sports
- No. of teams: 8 (as of the 2022-2023 school year)
- Region: Western Minneapolis-Saint Paul metro area, Minnesota
- Official website: MetroWestConference.com

Metro West Conference is a high school athletic conference in Minnesota. The name is based on the location of the schools in the western part of the Minneapolis-Saint Paul metro area. The conference began in fall 2014. The conference was announced on March 5, 2013, by seven public schools (Bloomington Jefferson, Bloomington Kennedy, Chanhassen, Chaska, Richfield, Robbinsdale Cooper and St. Louis Park). In September 2013, the Minnesota State High School League assigned Benilde-St. Margaret's, a private school, to the conference over the objections of the other schools. Richfield High School left in 2019. Kennedy left in 2022.

== Member schools ==
High School	Town/City	Team Name	Colors
Benilde-St. Margaret's	St. Louis Park MN	Red Knights	
Bloomington Jefferson	Bloomington MN	Jaguars	
Chanhassen	Chanhassen MN	Storm	
Chaska	Chaska MN	Hawks	
New Prague	New Prague MN	Trojans	
Orono	Long Lake MN	Spartans	
St. Louis Park	St. Louis Park MN	Orioles	
Waconia	Waconia MN	Wildcats	

== See also ==
- List of Minnesota State High School League Conferences
