= Classic Lake Conference =

Minnesotan state high school conference

- Classic Lake Conference logo
- Classification: MSHSL
- Founded: 1993
- Folded: 2010
- No. of teams: 5
- Region: Minnesota

The Classic Lake Conference was a conference for high schools in the west metro area of the Twin Cities, Minnesota. The Classic Lake Conference was one of many in the Minneapolis–St. Paul metro area that divide schools in proximity into different conferences. The mission of the conference was to promote and recognize excellence by providing quality experiences for students in programs of academics, arts, athletics and activities. The Classic Lake Conference conducted its activities under the auspices of and in concert with the Minnesota State High School League.

The five member high schools were, Robbinsdale Armstrong High School (Plymouth), Edina High School (Edina), Hopkins High School (Minnetonka), Minnetonka High School (Minnetonka), and Wayzata High School (Plymouth). Until 1999, Richfield High School was a member but left because of declining enrollment and changing demographics. Until 2005, St. Louis Park High School and Robbinsdale Cooper High School were also members, but left for the North Suburban Conference due to their smaller student bodies.

At a conference meeting, held November 7, 2008, the superintendents of four of five schools voted to remove Armstrong from the conference starting in the 2010–2011 school year. Despite having comparable enrollment to the conference's other schools, Armstrong has a lower percentage of students that compete in athletics. To facilitate scheduling of competitions, MSHSL bylaw states that a conference may not have less than five members. The original intention was to dissolve the Classic Lake. Armstrong, Hopkins and Wayzata applied to the Northwest Suburban Conference as a group. They were rejected, but Armstrong was later offered a spot as a single school. The other four then applied to the already huge Lake Conference, but were turned down.

The Classic Lake disbanded following the 2009–10 academic year. Armstrong joined the Northwest Suburban Conference while Edina, Hopkins, Minnetonka and Wayzata joined Eden Prairie in the Lake Conference.

All of the teams in the Classic Lake were part of the Lake Conference until 1993; because of the size of Lake, it had been split into two divisions: Lake Red and Lake Blue. All of the Classic Lake's schools were all in the Lake Blue conference, except for Robbinsdale Armstrong; most of the remaining schools merged to form a revised Lake Conference.
