= Underwood School District =

School district in Minnesota, United States

Underwood School District #550 is headquartered in Underwood, Minnesota, United States.

As of 2020 Dave Kuehn is the superintendent. The entire K-12 school has a single principal, Hamann.

== History ==
Kuehn was hired as the superintendent effective July 2, 2018. He was previously the assistant principal of Waconia High School. The decision to hire him was made in April of that year.
