= Byron High School (Minnesota) =

High school in Byron, Minnesota, United States

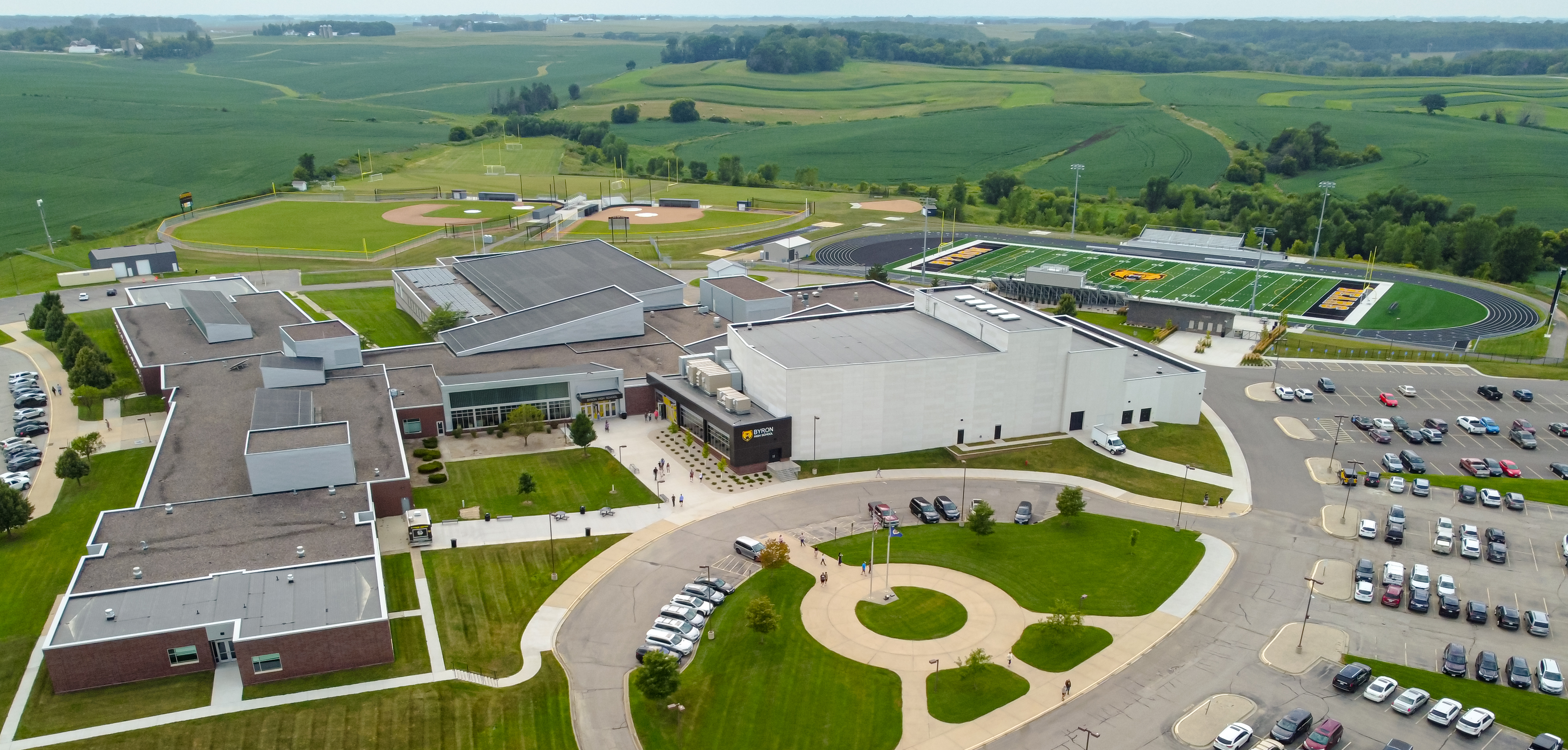

Location
- 1887 2nd Ave NW; Byron, Minnesota 55920; United States; 44.0336111°N 92.6561111°W

Information
- School type: High school
- Motto: Learn. Share. Innovate. Inspire
- Superintendent: Nate Walbruch
- School number: 531
- Principal: Malia Schroeder
- Teaching staff: 31.63 (FTE)
- Grades: 9-12
- Enrollment: 695 (2024–2025)
- Student to teacher ratio: 21.97
- Colors: Black and gold
- Mascot: Bear

Byron High School is a public high school located in Byron, Minnesota, United States. The current building was completed in 2006. In 2021, the Byron Public School district community voted to approve a $44 million referendum. This would go on to be used for improvements to the administration and community services building, additional classrooms for the high school, a new auditorium, and a new athletic facility for the high school.

== Awards ==
In 2011, Byron High School received the National Blue Ribbon award from the U.S. Department of Education. According to principal Mike Duffy, students' results on statewide reading, writing, and mathematics tests placed the school in the top ten percent, and its average ACT scores were above the state average at that time.

In the same year, the school received the Minnesota Association of Secondary School Principals' (MASSP) Star of Innovation award. Byron High School also received an Intel Schools of Distinction award in 2011, which included a US$10,000 grant.

== Notable alumni ==
- Ayoka Lee (2019) - basketball player for the Kansas State Wildcats
- Duane Quam (1978) - politician serving in the Minnesota House of Representatives
