= Menahga High School =

Coordinates: 46.752027°N 95.094888°W

Menahga School
- 216 Aspen Avenue Menahga MN 56464; United States

Information
- Type: Public
- Established: 1923
- School district: ISD 821
- Principal: Michelle Koch
- Head of school: Jay Kjos
- Teaching staff: 27.97 (FTE)
- Grades: 9–12
- Student to teacher ratio: 15.52
- Colors: Orange and black
- Athletics conference: Park Region
- Mascot: Braves
- School Song: "On Menahga"
- Website: www.menahga.k12.mn.us/page/2506

Menahga School is a public high school in Menahga, Minnesota, United States serving grades 9–12; it is located immediately east of U.S. Route 71.

== Academics ==
Menahga runs on a seven-period schedule. The year is broken up into two semesters with two quarters within each semester, for a total of four quarters. School is in session from 8:15 a.m. – 3:16 p.m.

== Extracurricular activities ==
=== Clubs and organizations ===
The activities offered to Menahga School students include Knowledge Bowl, Business Professionals of America (BPA), Future Farmers of America (FFA), Family Community Career Leaders of America (FCCLA), National Honor Society (NHS), Math League, Student Council, History Club, M-Club, Speech, and One-Act Play.

=== Sports ===
Menahga School offers multiple sport opportunities to all of the student body attending Menahga. The range of sports for males include Cross Country, Football, Basketball, Wrestling, Track, Baseball, Hockey and Golf. The sports offered to females include Cross Country, Volleyball, Gymnastics, Basketball, Track, Softball, Hockey, Cheerleading and Golf. Menahga and its southern neighbor, Cheerleading, Wrestling, Golf, and Football. The combined teams are known as the United North Central Warriors, and the team colors are gold and black.

=== Music ===
Menahga School's music department offers band classes, choir classes, and guitar classes, which are taught by Elizabeth Hahn and April Hodge, band and choir, respectively.
