= Blue Earth Area High School =

Coordinates: 43.6516217°N 94.0919040°W

- 1125 Highway 169 North; Blue Earth MN 56013

Information
- Type: Public
- School district: Blue Earth Area Schools
- Principal: Conan Shaffer
- Teaching staff: 21.57 (FTE)
- Grades: 8-12
- Student to teacher ratio: 17.52
- Color
- Athletics: Football, Tennis, Cross Country, Volleyball, Basketball, Gymnastics, Wrestling, Baseball, Softball, Track & Field, Golf
- Athletics conference: South Central Conference
- Mascot: Buccaneer
- Website: https://www.beaschools.org/o/beahs

Blue Earth Area High School is a public high school serving grades 8–12. Its sports teams are called the Buccaneers. It is located in Blue Earth, Minnesota, along U.S. Route 169.
