= Caledonia High School (Minnesota) =

Coordinates: 43.6341357°N 91.5023632°W

Location
- 825 N Warrior Ave; Caledonia, Minnesota 55921-888; United States

Information
- School type: Public High School
- School district: Caledonia Public Schools
- Superintendent: Craig Irhke
- School number: 299
- Principal: Nathan Boler
- Teaching staff: 20.52 (FTE)
- Grades: 9–12
- Gender: Co-Ed
  - Grade 9: 71
  - Grade 10: 63
  - Grade 11: 71
  - Grade 12: 62
- Student to teacher ratio: 13.01
- Hours in school day: 7
- Campus type: Rural
- Colors: Black and Vegas Gold
- Athletics conference: Three Rivers
- Team name: Warriors
- Website: Caledonia High School

For Caledonia High School in Mississippi see Lowndes County School District (Mississippi)

Caledonia High School (CHS) is a public high school located in Caledonia, Minnesota, United States, that serves Caledonia as well as the surrounding communities of Brownsville, Eitzen, Freeburg, and Reno. Caledonia High School's mascot is the "Warrior" and the school colors are black and vegas gold.

This map shows the incorporated and unincorporated areas in Houston County, Minnesota, highlighting Caledonia in red.

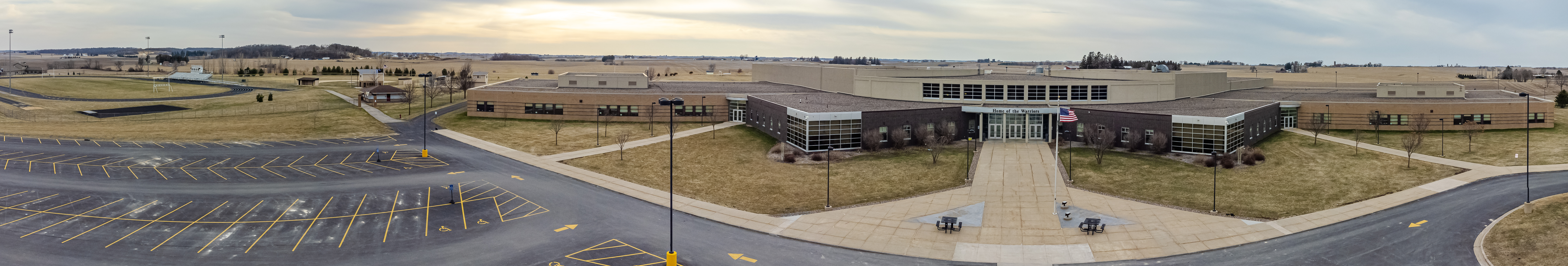
Caledonia High School

== History ==
The original Caledonia High School building now serves as the grade school. During the 2002–03 school year, the new Middle/High school building was finished. In the 2009-10 year, Paul DeMorett took over administration of the school, and in 2012–13, Ben Barton took over as the superintendent.

== Sports ==
=== Boys basketball ===
In 1997 Caledonia High School defeated DeLaSalle with a score of 69–47 to win the MSHSL Class AA Men's Basketball State Championship (Undefeated)/

=== Girls basketball ===
In 2009 Caledonia High School defeated Howard Lake-Waverly-Winsted with a score of 54–50 to win the MSHSL AA Girls Basketball State Championship (Undefeated).

=== Football ===
In 1976 Caledonia High School defeated Sartell with a score of 38–7 to win the Class B MSHSL State Football Championship (Undefeated). In 2007 Caledonia High School defeated Luverne with a score of 14–7 to win the MSHSL Class AA Football Championship. In 2008 Caledonia High School defeated Luverne with a score of 47–7 to win the MSHSL Class AA Football Championship.

In 2010 Caledonia High School defeated Triton with a score of 28–7 to win the MSHSL Class AA Football Championship (Undefeated). In 2011 Caledonia High School defeated Moose Lake with a score of 27–0 to win the MSHSL Class AA Football Championship. In 2012 Caledonia High School defeated Moose Lake with a score of 25–22 to win the MSHSL Class AA Football Championship (Undefeated). In 2013, Caledonia High School was defeated by Chatfield High School in overtime following an interception in the end zone. Chatfield subsequently went on to win the State Championship. In 2015 Caledonia High School defeated Pipestone with a score of 40–0 to win the MSHSL Class AA Football Championship (Undefeated). In 2016 Caledonia High School defeated Eden Valley-Watkins with a score of 61–12 to win the MSHSL Class AA Football Championship (Undefeated). In 2017 Caledonia High School defeated Pipestone with a score of 57–6 to win the MSHSL Class AA Football Championship (Undefeated). In 2018 Caledonia High School defeated Paynesville with a score of 40–6 to win the MSHSL Class AA Football Championship (Undefeated).[ In 2019 Caledonia High School defeated Minneapolis North with a score of 26–0 to win the MSHSL Class AA Football Championship (Undefeated).[

=== Track and field ===
In 2011 Caledonia/Spring Grove Track & Field team became the MSHSL Class A State Champions.

=== Wrestling ===
In 1970 Caledonia High School's wrestling team became the MSHSL Wrestling State Champions/
