= Kenyon-Wanamingo High School =

Location
- 400 6th Street; Kenyon, Minnesota 55946; United States

Information
- School district: Kenyon-Wanamingo Public Schools
- CEEB code: 241275
- Principal: Matt Ryan
- Teaching staff: 13.84 (FTE)
- Grades: 9–12
- Enrollment: 230 (2024-2025)
- Student to teacher ratio: 16.62
- Colors: Black, Red, and Silver
- Song: Minnesota State Rouser
- Athletics: MSHSL 1A
- Athletics conference: Hiawatha Valley League
- Mascot: Knight
- Fine Arts: Symphonic band, Chorale, Varsity choir, KW pep band, jazz band, theater, speech.
- Website: Kenyon-Wanamingo Schools

Kenyon-Wanamingo High School is a high school in Kenyon, Minnesota, United States.

== Extracurricular activities ==
=== Athletics ===
Kenyon-Wanamingo fields teams in baseball, basketball, cheerleading, (activity) cross country, dance team, football, golf, softball, track and field, volleyball, and wrestling.

=== Fine Arts ===
HS band, Pep band, jazz band, summer marching band (volunteer) chorale, varsity choir, theater

The Kenyon Wanamingo High school band has scored superior ratings at state contest (2015, 2014, 2013, 2016, 2017) and has 100% participation in the solo ensemble contest. In 2015, KWHS band was selected as a semi finalist for the prestigious Grammy signature school award.

The music department tours every other year to destinations throughout the United States. Known for innovative programming and service oriented music themes, Kenyon Wanamingo music students engage in benevolent activities benefitting the community and beyond. In 2018, the KWHS Music department travelled to Norway.

Past Concert themes include: Celebrate Earth, Minnesota Moments, To the Limit, Through the Storm, Light and Darkness, and Innovate, and Water.

== Notable alumni ==
- Marty Haugen - An American composer of liturgical music. He creates settings for both Roman Catholic and Protestant congregations. Was named Pastoral Musician of the Year in 2007.
- Steve Sviggum - Speaker of the Minnesota House of Representatives
- Jeff Broin is the founder of U.S.-based POET, LLC, a producer of ethanol and other biorefined products. He currently serves as chairman and CEO.
