= New Prague High School =

Coordinates: 44.559515°N 93.576140°W

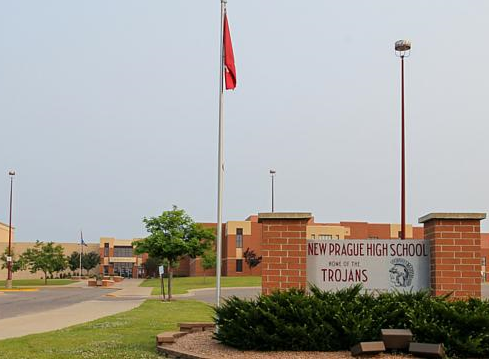
- New Prague High School Front Entrance

Location
- 221 12th Street NE; New Prague, Minnesota 56071; United States

Information
- Established: 1999
- School district: New Prague Area Schools
- CEEB code: 241820
- Principal: Nicole Adams
- Teaching staff: 66.69 (FTE) (as of 2023-2024)
- Grades: 9–12
- Enrollment: 1,311 (2023-2024)
- Student to teacher ratio: 29.66
- Colors: Cardinal and Black
- Athletics conference: Metro West Conference
- Mascot: Trojan
- Team name: Trojans
- Newspaper: Trojan Times
- Website: nphs.npaschools.org

New Prague High School is a public secondary school in New Prague, Minnesota, United States serving the communities of New Prague, Lonsdale, and Elko New Market. The school has a ninety-eight percent or better graduation rate on average, and ninety percent of graduates attend a post-secondary institution.

== History ==
The first high school classes in New Prague were held in a K–12 schoolhouse with the first high school class graduating in 1907. A separate high school building was constructed in 1924 at the corner of 1st Avenue NW and Main Street. An addition to that building opened in 1963, and a new high school opened across the street in 1976. The current high school building opened in 1999 at the corner of Columbus Ave. and 12th St. NE, onto which an addition was added in 2006.

== Academics ==
New Prague High School offers over one hundred courses in fourteen different areas of study. There are a variety of required and elective classes for students to choose from. College in the Schools (CIS) and Advanced Placement (AP) classes are offered to the student body. Independent studies, mentorship, youth service, and extended day programs, are provided for students as well. Courses are delivered using a semester system with seven period school days.

== Extracurricular activities ==
- Academic Challenge
- Archery Club
- Art Club
- High Mileage Club
- Band
- Choir
- Equestrian Club
- Fall Musical
- German Club
- National Honor Society
- Robotics Club
- One Act Play
- Scholastic Clay Target
- Spanish Club
- Speech Team Advisor
- Spring Play
- Student Council
- Trojan Times
- Yearbook Advisor
- Youth in Government

== Athletics ==
GIRLS:
Fall:
Volleyball, Cheerleading, Tennis, Football
Cross Country, Soccer, Swimming/Diving
Winter:
Dance Team, Cheerleading, Basketball
Gymnastics, Wrestling, Nordic Skiing, Hockey
Spring:
Golf, Track and Field, Softball, Lacrosse

BOYS:
Fall:
Football, Soccer, Cross Country
Winter:
Basketball, Hockey, Nordic Skiing, Wrestling
Spring:
Tennis, Golf, Baseball, Track and Field, Lacrosse

Adaptive Softball and Floor Hockey are also offered.

== Notable alumni ==
- Laura Brod, member of the Minnesota House of Representatives (2003–2011).
- Ron Johnson, former NBA player
- Robert Vanasek, former member (1973–1993) and Speaker (1987–1992) of the Minnesota House of Representatives
