= Northwest Suburban Conference (Minnesota) =

Athletic conference

- Conference: MSHSL
- No. of teams: 13
- Region: Minnesota
- Official website: www.nwsconference.org

Locations
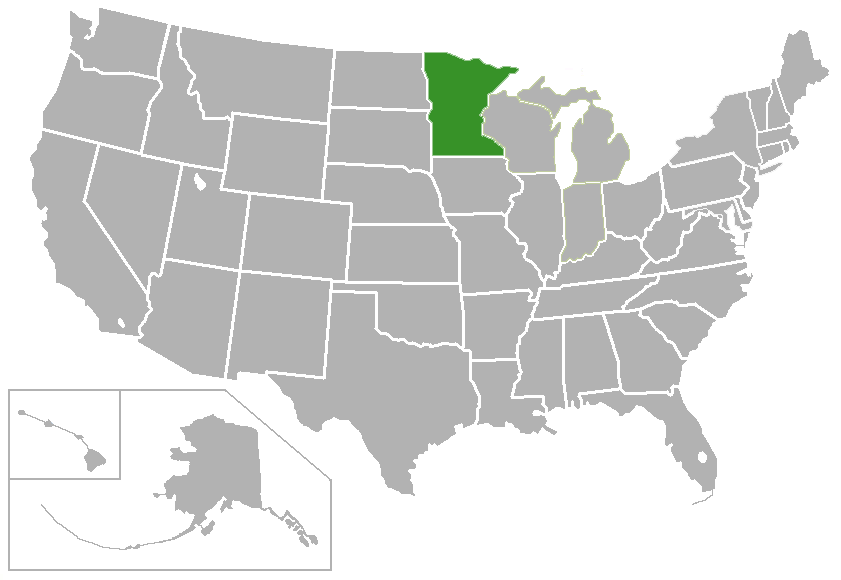

The Northwest Suburban Conference is an athletic conference for all northwest suburban high schools of Minneapolis, Minnesota.

On August 30, 2024, Maple Grove announced that they will be switching from the Northwest Suburban Conference to join the Lake Conference in the fall of 2025.

== Members ==
School	Location	Established	Enrollment	Nickname	Colors
Andover High School	Andover	2002	1,642	Huskies	
Anoka High School	Anoka	1880	2,020	Tornadoes	
Blaine High School	Blaine	1972	2,722	Bengals	
Centennial High School	Circle Pines	1958	1,881	Cougars	
Champlin Park High School	Brooklyn Park	1992	2,544	Rebels	
Coon Rapids High School	Coon Rapids	1963	1,575	Cardinals	
Elk River High School	Elk River	1888	1,434	Elks	
Osseo Senior High School	Osseo	1924	1,821	Orioles	
Park Center Senior High School	Brooklyn Park	1971	1,538	Pirates	
Robbinsdale Armstrong High School	Plymouth	1970	1,518	Falcons	
Rogers High School	Rogers	2003	1,762	Royals	
Spring Lake Park High School	Spring Lake Park	1955	1,601	Panthers	
Totino-Grace High School	Fridley	1966	689	Eagles	

== Member schools by district ==
- Anoka-Hennepin School District 11
  - Andover High School — Andover
  - Anoka High School — Anoka
  - Blaine High School — Blaine
  - Champlin Park High School — Champlin
  - Coon Rapids High School — Coon Rapids
- Centennial School District 12
  - Centennial High School — Circle Pines
- Elk River Area School District 728
  - Elk River High School — Elk River
  - Rogers High School — Rogers (2019)
- Osseo School District 279
  - Osseo Senior High School — Osseo
  - Park Center Senior High School — Brooklyn Park
- Robbinsdale School District 281
  - Robbinsdale Armstrong High School — Plymouth, MN (2010)
- Spring Lake Park School District 16
  - Spring Lake Park High School— Spring Lake Park
- Totino Grace
  - Totino-Grace High School— Fridley
