= Elk River High School =

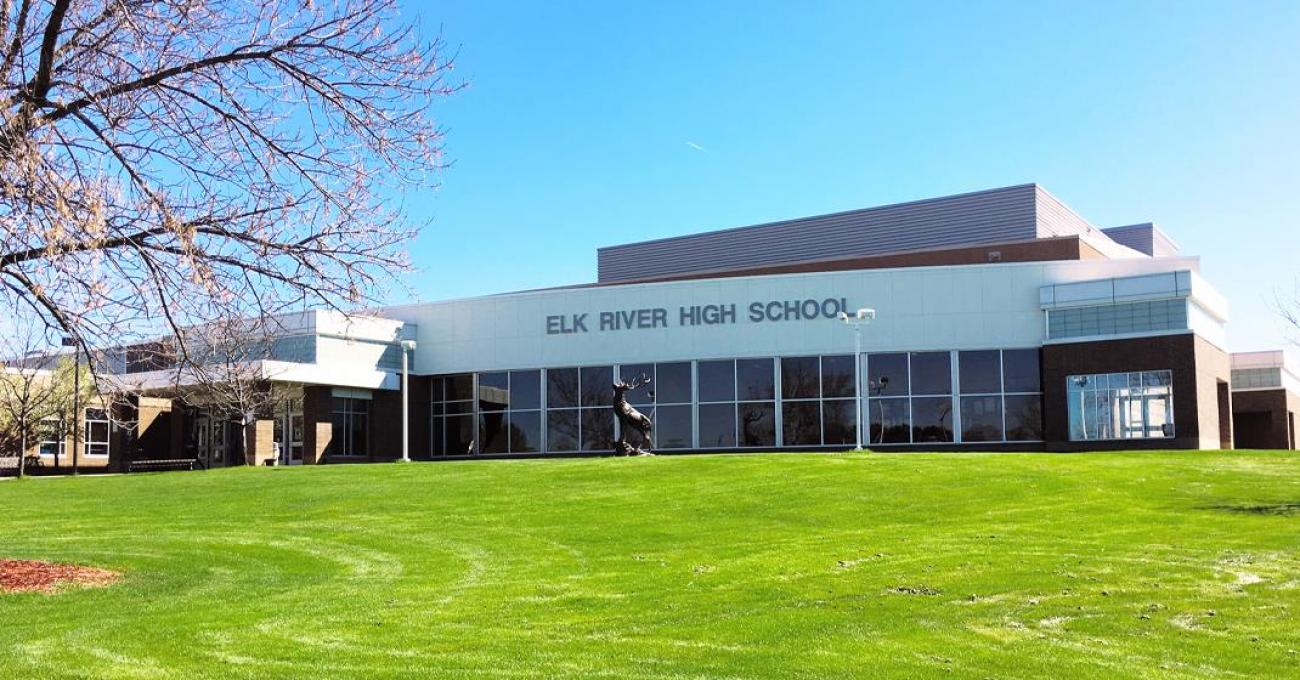
- Elk River High School in 2022

Location
- 900 School Street; Elk River, Minnesota 55330; United States; 45.3122°N 93.5696°W

Information
- Type: Public high school
- Opened: 1888
- School district: ISD 728
- Principal: Michael Zeman
- Teaching staff: 62.44 (FTE)
- Enrollment: 1,602 (2023-2024)
- Student to teacher ratio: 25.66
- Campus size: Large
- Campus type: Suburban
- Colors: Red, Black, and White
- Team name: Elks
- Rivals: Andover Huskies, Rogers Royals
- Communities served: Elk River; Zimmerman; Rogers
- Feeder schools: VandenBerge Middle School; Salk Middle School
- Website: www.isd728.org/ElkRiverHigh

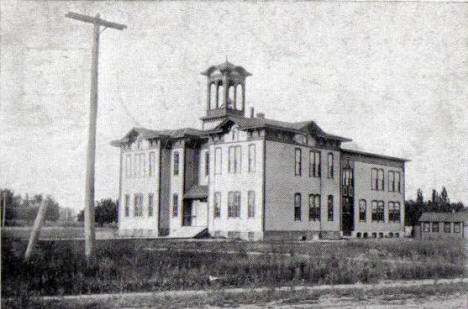
Elk River High School in 1890

Elk River High School (variously as Elk River Senior High School) is a public high school located in Elk River, Minnesota, United States. It is the one of four high schools in the Elk River Area School District (ISD 728) and its feeder schools are VandenBerge Middle School and Salk Middle School. In the 2011–12 school year, Elk River had an enrollment of 1,649 students. Elk River's colors are red and white. The National Center of Education Statistics classifies the high school as a large, suburban campus. The Elk River Elks compete in the Northwest Suburban Conference of the Minnesota State High School League as well as in Section 7AAAAA (5A) for football. Elk River High School opened in 1888.

== Demographics ==
During the 2011–12 school year, Elk River High School was 80% White, 6% Hispanic, 0% Hawaii Native/Pacific Islander, 6% Black, 7% Asian, and 1% Native American. 14% of students were eligible for the Free Lunch Program and 6% were eligible for the Reduced-Price Lunch Program.

== Athletics ==
=== Football ===
Elk River played in one of the earliest recorded football games in state history (1891-1892 - defeated Monticello 29-0 & 4-0) and there are records of them completing 131 seasons of varsity football through the 2022 season.

They have that have played in the District 16, Rum River, Skyline, Independent, Central Lakes, North Suburban, Twin Cities Suburban, Northwest Suburban, Mississippi 8, and North Central District (Blue & Black Sub-district) conferences.

The team was the 5A state champion in 2016, 2022, and 2024. In the 2022 5A state championship its kicker Breanna Bernardson became the first female football player to score in a Minnesota state championship football game; she scored three extra points.

=== Ice hockey ===
The boys' hockey team won the state championship in 2001. Both the boys' and girls' hockey teams play home games on an NHL sized sheet in Furniture and Things Community Event Center, which is located next to the high school. This arena holds 2,000+ spectators and has full in game entertainment.

== Notable alumni ==
- Gerhard Pfanzelter (class of c. 1962) (exchange student) — Austrian ambassador to the United States
- Joel Otto (class of 1980) — NHL forward and 1989 Stanley Cup champion with the Calgary Flames
- Paul Martin (class of 2000) — NHL defenseman
- Dan Hinote (class of 1995) — NHL winger and coach
- Nate Prosser (class of 2004) — NHL defenseman
- Dave Mordal — comedian
- Emma Bates (Class of 2010) — Distance Runner
- Paul Novotny (Class of 1984) — Politician

== Media coverage ==
In 2010, four athletes were removed from the high school's varsity football team, and five others were suspended for hazing.
