= Zack Johnson (American football) =

American football player (born 1997)

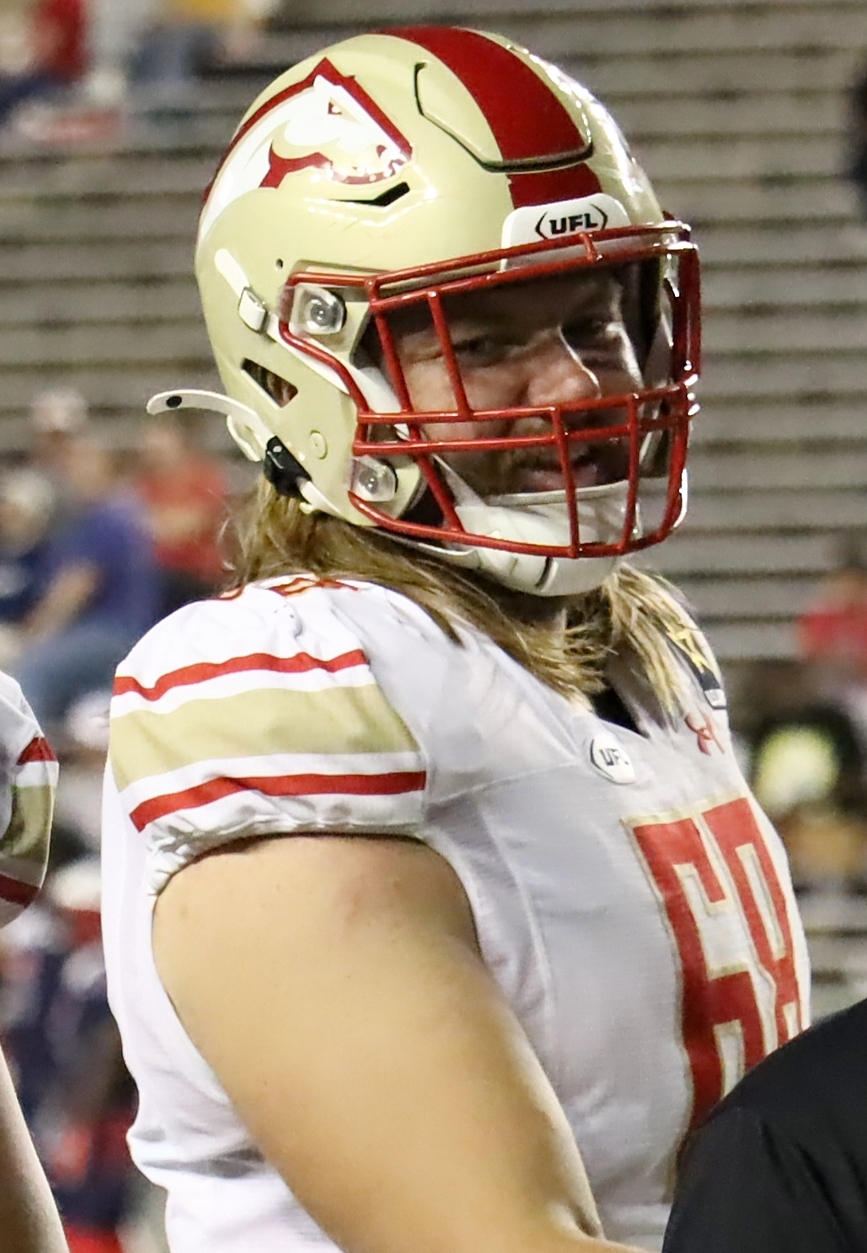
- Johnson with the Birmingham Stallions in 2024

Profile
- Position: Offensive guard

Personal information
- Born: January 19, 1997 (age 29); Blaine, Minnesota, U.S.
- Listed height: 6 ft 6 in (1.98 m)
- Listed weight: 315 lb (143 kg)

Career information
- High school: Spring Lake Park (Spring Lake Park, Minnesota)
- College: North Dakota State (2015–2019)
- NFL draft: 2020: undrafted

Career history
- Green Bay Packers (2020–2021); Arizona Cardinals (2021)*; Denver Broncos (2021–2022)*; Baltimore Ravens (2022)*; Tennessee Titans (2022–2023); Birmingham Stallions (2024); Cleveland Browns (2024)*; San Francisco 49ers (2024)*; Detroit Lions (2025)*; Birmingham Stallions (2026)
- * Offseason or practice squad member only

Awards and highlights
- UFL champion (2024); All-UFL Team (2024); 4× FCS national champion (2015, 2017–2019); 2× FCS All-American (2018, 2019)

Career NFL statistics
- Games played: 1
- Stats at Pro Football Reference

Zackary J. Johnson (born 1997) is an American professional football offensive guard. He played college football for the North Dakota State Bison and has also been a member of the Green Bay Packers, Arizona Cardinals, Denver Broncos, and Baltimore Ravens.

== Early life ==
Johnson was born in Blaine, Minnesota; January 19, 1997. His brother, Ben, played college football for the Bemidji State Beavers. Johnson attended Spring Lake Park High School and was a three-year varsity letter winner in football, while additionally playing hockey and baseball. In football, he played at offensive tackle, defensive tackle and placekicker, earning as a senior Associated Press third-team all-state honors, as well as Star Tribune second-team all-metro. He committed to play college football for the North Dakota State University Bison (NDSU).

== College career ==
Johnson redshirted as a true freshman at North Dakota State in 2015. He was a member of their national championship team that season, although he saw no playing time. He saw limited action in 2016, only seeing offensive playing time in the final few games. Playing left tackle, he was lined up directly next to another player named Zack Johnson when on offense. He appeared in a total of eight games on the season.

Johnson became a full-time starter at right tackle as a sophomore in 2017, a position he held for the rest of his college career. He started all 15 games and helped NDSU set a school record in rushing yards, being named honorable mention all-conference as they went on to win the national championship. In 2018, he again started every game, allowing only two sacks as North Dakota State won another national championship. Johnson was named an FCS All-American and a first-team All-Missouri Valley Football Conference (MVFC) selection for his performance.

As a senior in 2019, Johnson moved to right guard and started all 16 games, only allowing one sack while helping NDSU win their third-straight national championship. He was named first-team All-American and first-team All-MVFC, and was later invited to the NFLPA Collegiate Bowl.

== Professional career ==
Pre-draft measurables
Height	Weight	Arm length	Hand span	Wingspan
6 ft 5 3/4 in (1.97 m)	310 lb (141 kg)	34 1/2 in (0.88 m)	10 1/4 in (0.26 m)	6 ft 10 5/8 in (2.10 m)
All values from Pro Day

=== Green Bay Packers ===
After going unselected in the 2020 NFL draft, Johnson was signed by the Green Bay Packers as an undrafted free agent. He was released at the final roster cuts, but was soon after re-signed to the practice squad. He was elevated to the active roster for their game with the Carolina Panthers, but did not appear in the match. Johnson signed a reserve/futures contract with the team on January 27, 2021. He was released on August 17, 2021.

=== Arizona Cardinals ===
Johnson was signed to the practice squad of the Arizona Cardinals on September 30, 2021. He was released on October 29.

=== Denver Broncos ===
On November 24, 2021, Johnson was signed to the practice squad of the Denver Broncos. He was signed to a futures contract on January 10, 2022. Johnson was released by the Broncos on May 13, before being re-signed on May 17. He was released at the final roster cuts on August 30.

=== Baltimore Ravens ===
The Baltimore Ravens signed Johnson to their practice squad on September 27, 2022. He was released on December 20.

=== Tennessee Titans ===
On December 21, 2022, Johnson was signed to the practice squad by the Tennessee Titans when his former NDSU teammate Dillon Radunz went on injured reserve. Johnson was elevated to the active roster for the Titans' game against the Dallas Cowboys, and made his debut in the 27–13 loss, appearing on four offensive and three special teams snaps. He signed a future contract on January 10, 2023. He was waived on August 27, 2023.

=== Birmingham Stallions ===
On October 11, 2023, Johnson signed with the Birmingham Stallions of the United Football League (UFL). He was named to the 2024 All-UFL team on June 5, 2024.

=== Cleveland Browns ===
On July 27, 2024, Johnson signed with the Cleveland Browns. He was waived on August 26.

=== San Francisco 49ers ===
On December 31, 2024, Johnson signed with the San Francisco 49ers' practice squad. He signed a reserve/future contract with San Francisco on January 6, 2025. On August 9, Johnson was waived by the 49ers.

=== Detroit Lions ===
On August 14, 2025, Johnson signed with the Detroit Lions. He was waived on August 26 as part of final roster cuts.

=== Birmingham Stallions (second stint) ===
On March 6, 2026, Johnson re-signed with the Stallions.
