= E. J. Ejiya =

American football player (born 1995)

No. 44
- Position: Linebacker

Personal information
- Born: October 6, 1995 (age 31); Blaine, Minnesota, U.S.
- Listed height: 6 ft 3 in (1.91 m)
- Listed weight: 231 lb (105 kg)

Career information
- High school: Spring Lake Park (MN)
- College: North Texas
- NFL draft: 2019: undrafted

Career history
- Baltimore Ravens (2019)*; TSL Aviators (2021); Pittsburgh Maulers (2022)
- * Offseason or practice squad member only

E. J. Ejiya (born October 6, 1995) is an American former professional football linebacker. He played college football at North Texas.

== Professional career ==
=== Baltimore Ravens ===
Ejiya was signed by the Baltimore Ravens as an undrafted free agent on April 28, 2019. During preseason, he played in four games. He had a total of 3 tackles, 1 sack, and 1 quarterback hit. He was waived during final roster cuts on August 31, 2019,

=== TSL Aviators ===
On May 15, 2021, Ejiya signed with the TSL Aviators.

=== Pittsburgh Maulers ===
Ejiya was selected in the 21st round of the 2022 USFL draft by the Pittsburgh Maulers. He was placed on injured reserve on May 20, 2022.
