= Nick Jensen =

American ice hockey player (born 1990)

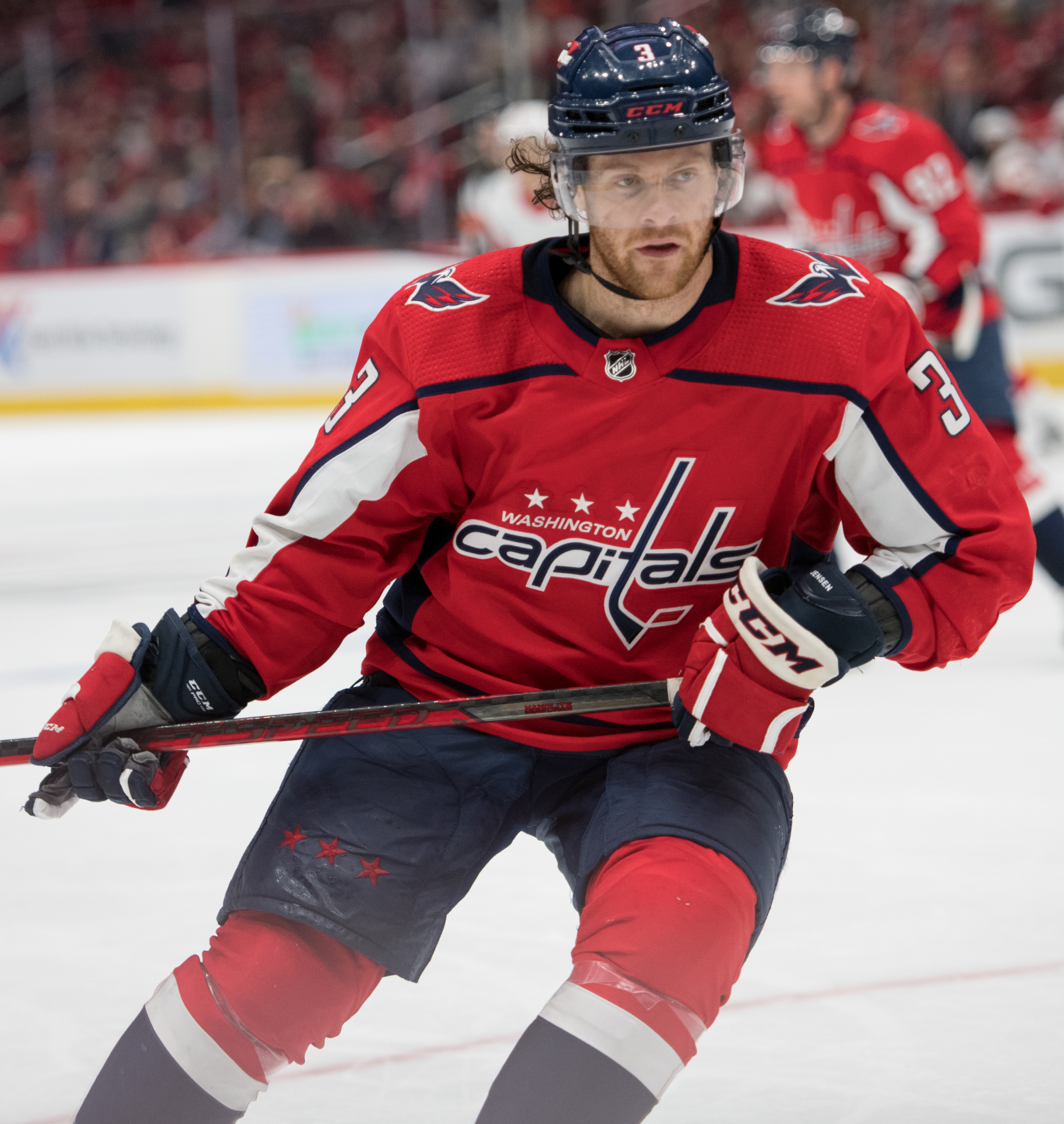
- Jensen with the Washington Capitals in 2021
- Born: September 21, 1990 (age 36) Saint Paul, Minnesota, U.S.
- Height: 6 ft 0 in (183 cm)
- Weight: 196 lb (89 kg; 14 st 0 lb)
- Position: Defense
- Shoots: Right
- NHL team (P) Cur. team Former teams: Anaheim Ducks; San Diego Gulls (AHL); Detroit Red Wings; Washington Capitals; Ottawa Senators
- National team: United States
- NHL draft: 150th overall, 2009; Detroit Red Wings
- Playing career: 2013–present

Nick Jensen (born September 21, 1990) is an American professional ice hockey player who is a defenseman for the San Diego Gulls of the American Hockey League while under contract to the Anaheim Ducks of the National Hockey League (NHL). Jensen was selected 150th overall by the Detroit Red Wings in the 2009 NHL entry draft. He has also previously played for the Washington Capitals and Ottawa Senators.

== Early life ==
Jensen was born on September 21, 1990, in Saint Paul, Minnesota. His father Jeff played college hockey at Lake Superior State and was a Colorado Rockies draft pick. His uncle Steve Jensen also played hockey for the Minnesota North Stars and Los Angeles Kings and was an Olympian with Team USA at the 1976 Winter Olympics.

== Playing career ==
=== Amateur ===
Jensen played two seasons with the Rogers Royals of the Minnesota State High School League. He graduated to the Green Bay Gamblers of the United States Hockey League (USHL) and in his first season in 2008–09, he registered five goals, 17 assists and 22 points in 52 games. The Gamblers made the USHL playoffs, and in seven games he added one assist. In his second season in 2009–10, he made 53 appearances, scoring six goals and 27 points. The Gamblers made the playoffs again that season and he was instrumental in the team's run to the finals where they won Clark Cup as league champions. Jensen was named a 2010 USHL All-Star.

He played college hockey with the St. Cloud State Huskies in the NCAA Men's Division I Western Collegiate Hockey Association (WCHA) conference. In his freshman season at St. Cloud State in 2010–11, Jensen recorded five goals and 18 assists in 38 games. In his sophomore season in 2011–12, Jensen was the third-leading scorer for St. Cloud State. Jensen recorded six goals and 26 assists in 39 games. St. Cloud State finished sixth in the competitive WCHA. After sweeping Nebraska Omaha in the first round of the playoffs, the Huskies suffered a season-ending loss to North Dakota in the quarterfinal. He was named a WHCA Third Team All-Star for 2011–12.

In his junior season in 2012–13, Jensen skated in 42 games for St. Cloud State, and was named the WCHA's Defensive Player of the Year and selected to the NCAA West First All-American Team. Jensen recorded four goals and was second on the Huskies with 27 assists. St. Cloud State finished tied with Minnesota for first in the WCHA and rebounded from a loss to Wisconsin in the WCHA semifinals to reach the Frozen Four. St. Cloud State defeated Notre Dame, 5–1, and Miami, 4–1, to capture the NCAA Midwest Regional before falling to Quinnipiac, 4–1, in the Frozen Four semifinals.

=== Professional ===
==== Detroit Red Wings ====
Jensen was selected by the Detroit Red Wings of the National Hockey League (NHL) in the fifth round, 150th overall, of the 2009 NHL entry draft. On May 2, 2013, the Red Wings signed him to a two-year entry-level contract. He was assigned to Detroit's American Hockey League (AHL) affiliate, the Grand Rapids Griffins for the 2013–14 season. He played 45 games with the Griffins, registering nine assists. He also made three appearances with the ECHL's Toledo Walleye. The Griffins made the 2014 Calder Cup playoffs and Jensen appeared in ten playoff games, marking one assist. During the 2014–15 season, Jensen recorded six goals and 21 assists in 75 games for the Griffins, and ranked second among Griffins defenseman in scoring. Jensen finished the season with a plus-30 rating, which was tied for the best plus-minus rating in the AHL. The 2015 Calder Cup playoffs saw the Griffins go on a deep run making it to the Western Conference Finals, before ultimately losing to the Utica Comets. Jensen appeared in 16 playoff games, marking three points. On July 13, 2015, the Red Wings signed Jensen to a two-year contract extension. During the 2015–16 season, on January 24, 2016, Jensen was recalled by the Detroit Red Wings. Prior to being recalled, Jensen recorded two goals and six assists in 39 games for the Griffins. He was reassigned to the Griffins on January 26 without featuring in a game. He finished the season appearing in 75 games with Grand Rapids, scoring three goals and 19 points. The Griffins made the 2016 Calder Cup playoffs and Jensen played in nine playoff games, registering two points.

On December 19, 2016, Jensen was recalled by the Detroit Red Wings. Prior to being recalled, Jensen recorded one goal and five assists in 27 games for Grand Rapids. He made his NHL debut for the Red Wings the following day in a game against the Tampa Bay Lightning and registered his first NHL point, assisting on Anthony Mantha's third period goal in a 4–1 loss. However, in the same game, he was involved in a collision with his goaltender, Jimmy Howard, that forced Howard from the game. Howard suffered a knee sprain in the collision and missed over a month. He scored his first goal with the Red Wings on January 31, 2017, on Cory Schneider in a 4–3 loss to the New Jersey Devils. On February 27, the Red Wings signed Jensen to a two-year contract extension. He finished the season playing in 49 games, scoring four goals and 13 points for the Red Wings.

He made the Red Wings out of training camp for the 2017–18 season. He registered his first three point game on October 18 versus the Toronto Maple Leafs, assisting on goals by Dylan Larkin, Tomáš Tatar, and Jonathan Ericsson in a 6–3 loss. He made 81 appearances for Detroit, registering 15 points, all assists. During the 2018–19 season, his third season with the Red Wings, Jensen recorded two goals and 13 assists, tying his previous season-high totals through 60 games with 15 points. He marked his first multi-goal game on October 11, scoring two goals against Frederik Andersen in a 5–3 loss to the Toronto Maple Leafs.

==== Washington Capitals ====
While in the final year of his contract, Jensen was traded by the Red Wings, along with a fifth-round pick in the 2019 NHL entry draft, to the Washington Capitals in exchange for defenseman Madison Bowey, and a second-round pick in the 2020 NHL entry draft on February 22, 2019. He had fallen down the depth chart behind the younger Gustav Lindström and the Red Wings had not agreed with his demands in contract negotiations. He was immediately re-signed to a four-year, $10 million contract extension by the Capitals. He made his Capitals debut on February 24 in a 6–5 victory over the New York Rangers. He played with Brooks Orpik on the third pairing. He marked his first point with the Capitals on March 6 assisting on Nicklas Bäckström's second period goal in a 5–3 win over the Philadelphia Flyers. He finished the regular season appearing in 20 games for Washington, registering five assists. The Capitals made the 2019 Stanley Cup playoffs and faced the Carolina Hurricanes in the first round. Jensen made his NHL playoff debut on April 11 in the first game of the series. He played in seven games in the series, going scoreless, as the Hurricanes eliminated the Capitals.

Jensen played in 68 games for the Capitals in the 2019–20 season, scoring eight points (all assists), before the NHL suspended the season due to the COVID-19 pandemic on March 12, 2020. However, the NHL resumed play with the 2020 Stanley Cup playoffs in August with special rules. As the Capitals were among the four best teams in the Eastern Conference, they played in a round-robin tournament with the other three best teams to determine their playoff seeding. After playing the round-robin games, the Capitals faced the New York Islanders, who eliminated them in five games. Jensen appeared in all eight of the Capitals playoff games, going scoreless.

In the pandemic-shortened 2020–21 season, in his 109th game with the Capitals, Jensen scored his first goal in a Capitals uniform on March 7, 2021, against the Philadelphia Flyers. At the time of the goal, Jensen had recorded 14 points over 41 games. He finished the season with two goals and 14 points in 53 games. The Capitals made the 2021 Stanley Cup playoffs and faced the Boston Bruins in the first round. The Capitals were eliminated in five games. Jensen played in all of the Capitals' playoff games, going scoreless. Prior to the 2021 NHL expansion draft, Jensen was among those players left unprotected by the Capitals for the Seattle Kraken to choose from. He was not selected by the Kraken and in the 2021–22 season, he appeared in 76 games, setting new career-highs with five goals and 21 points. In the 2022 Stanley Cup playoffs, the Capitals were eliminated by the Florida Panthers in the first round, with Jensen appearing in all six games, going scoreless.

During the 2022-23 NHL season, rumors of a potential trade involving Jensen surfaced. However, a few days before the trade deadline on February 28, 2023, Jensen signed a three year, $12.15 million contract extension, which carried a $4.05 million average annual value. He appeared in 77 games with the Capitals, tying his career high with five goals and setting a new career high with 29 points. In 2023–24, Jensen played in 78 games, scoring just one goal and 14 points. On April 13, 2024, he took a hit from Mikey Eyssimont of the Tampa Bay Lightning along the boards that left him needing a stretcher in order for him to leave the ice. He walked out of the building but missed the final two games of the season due to the injury.

==== Ottawa Senators ====
On July 1, 2024, the Capitals traded Jensen, along with a third-round pick in the 2026 NHL entry draft, to the Ottawa Senators in exchange for defenseman Jakob Chychrun. He made his Senators' debut in the season opener on October 10, in a 3–1 victory over the Florida Panthers. He recorded his first point for the team in the next game on October 12, assisting on Tim Stützle's third period goal in a 4–1 loss to the Montreal Canadiens. He tallied his first goal for the Senators on November 7, in a 4–2 loss to the New York Islanders. Playing primarily with Thomas Chabot, Jensen helped stabilize the Senators' defence corps on his arrival. This was further indicated when he missed a short period of time in March 2025 with an injury and his absence saw a decline in the team's defensive capability. He finished the season with three goals and 18 points in 71 games with Ottawa. The Senators qualified for the playoffs and faced the Toronto Maple Leafs in the opening round. The Senators were eliminated by the Maple Leafs in six games. Jensen went scoreless in the series.

Having suffered through the latter part of the season with a hip injury, Jensen underwent surgery on May 19. He spent the entire offseason and most of the 2025 training camp recovering, returning only for the final preseason exhibition game in October. He was in the lineup for the season-opener against the Montreal Canadiens on October 9, but his season ended early after he suffered a knee injury on March 11, 2026, that required surgery to repair a torn meniscus. In 61 games, he tallied four goals and 17 points.

==== Anaheim Ducks ====
On July 1, 2026, Jensen signed as a free agent to a two-year, $4.5 million contract with the Anaheim Ducks. He made his debut with the team on October 19 in a 5–2 loss to the Rangers, scoring his first goal with the team in the game. He appeared in three games with Anaheim scoring the one goal and two points before he was placed on waivers on October 31. After going unclaimed, he was assigned to Anaheim's AHL affiliate, the San Diego Gulls.

== International play ==
Medal record

Representing United States

Ice hockey

World Championships
Bronze medal – third place	2018 Denmark	

World Junior A Challenge
Gold medal – first place	2009 Summerside	

On April 28, 2018, Jensen and Red Wings teammate Dylan Larkin were named to the United States men's national ice hockey team to compete at the 2018 IIHF World Championship. He recorded one goal and three assists in 10 games and won a bronze medal.

== Personal life ==
Jensen and his wife Jenner both played sports at Rogers High School in Rogers, Minnesota. She was an All-State basketball player who scored 1,634 points during her career. Jensen and his wife have three children.

== Career statistics ==
=== Regular season and playoffs ===
			Regular season					Playoffs
Season	Team	League	GP	G	A	Pts	PIM	GP	G	A	Pts	PIM
2006–07	Rogers High School	USHS	21	20	17	37	6	—	—	—	—	—
2007–08	Rogers High School	USHS	14	14	13	27	8	—	—	—	—	—
2008–09	Green Bay Gamblers	USHL	52	5	17	22	27	7	0	1	1	2
2009–10	Green Bay Gamblers	USHL	53	6	21	27	35	12	2	6	8	6
2010–11	St. Cloud State Huskies	WCHA	38	5	18	23	10	—	—	—	—	—
2011–12	St. Cloud State Huskies	WCHA	39	6	26	32	4	—	—	—	—	—
2012–13	St. Cloud State Huskies	WCHA	42	4	27	31	4	—	—	—	—	—
2013–14	Grand Rapids Griffins	AHL	45	0	9	9	8	10	0	1	1	2
2013–14	Toledo Walleye	ECHL	3	0	0	0	0	—	—	—	—	—
2014–15	Grand Rapids Griffins	AHL	75	6	21	27	15	16	0	3	3	4
2015–16	Grand Rapids Griffins	AHL	75	3	16	19	17	9	0	2	2	0
2016–17	Grand Rapids Griffins	AHL	27	1	5	6	6	—	—	—	—	—
2016–17	Detroit Red Wings	NHL	49	4	9	13	12	—	—	—	—	—
2017–18	Detroit Red Wings	NHL	81	0	15	15	27	—	—	—	—	—
2018–19	Detroit Red Wings	NHL	60	2	13	15	17	—	—	—	—	—
2018–19	Washington Capitals	NHL	20	0	5	5	4	7	0	0	0	2
2019–20	Washington Capitals	NHL	68	0	8	8	13	8	0	0	0	0
2020–21	Washington Capitals	NHL	53	2	12	14	14	5	0	0	0	2
2021–22	Washington Capitals	NHL	76	5	16	21	21	6	0	0	0	4
2022–23	Washington Capitals	NHL	77	5	24	29	18	—	—	—	—	—
2023–24	Washington Capitals	NHL	78	1	13	14	10	1	0	0	0	2
2024–25	Ottawa Senators	NHL	71	3	18	21	6	6	0	0	0	2
2025–26	Ottawa Senators	NHL	61	4	13	17	22	—	—	—	—	—
NHL totals			694	26	146	172	164	33	0	0	0	12

=== International ===
Year	Team	Event	Result	GP	G	A	Pts	PIM
2018	United States	WC	3rd place, bronze medalist(s)	10	1	3	4	0
Senior totals				10	1	3	4	0

== Awards and honors ==
Award	Year
College
All-WCHA Third Team	2011–12
All-WCHA First Team	2012–13
AHCA West First-Team All-American	2012–13

Awards and achievements
Preceded by Justin Schultz	WCHA Defensive Player of the Year; 2012–13	Succeeded by Colton Parayko
