= Elkhi Stadium =

Outdoor sports venue in Minnesota, United States

- U.S. National Register of Historic Places
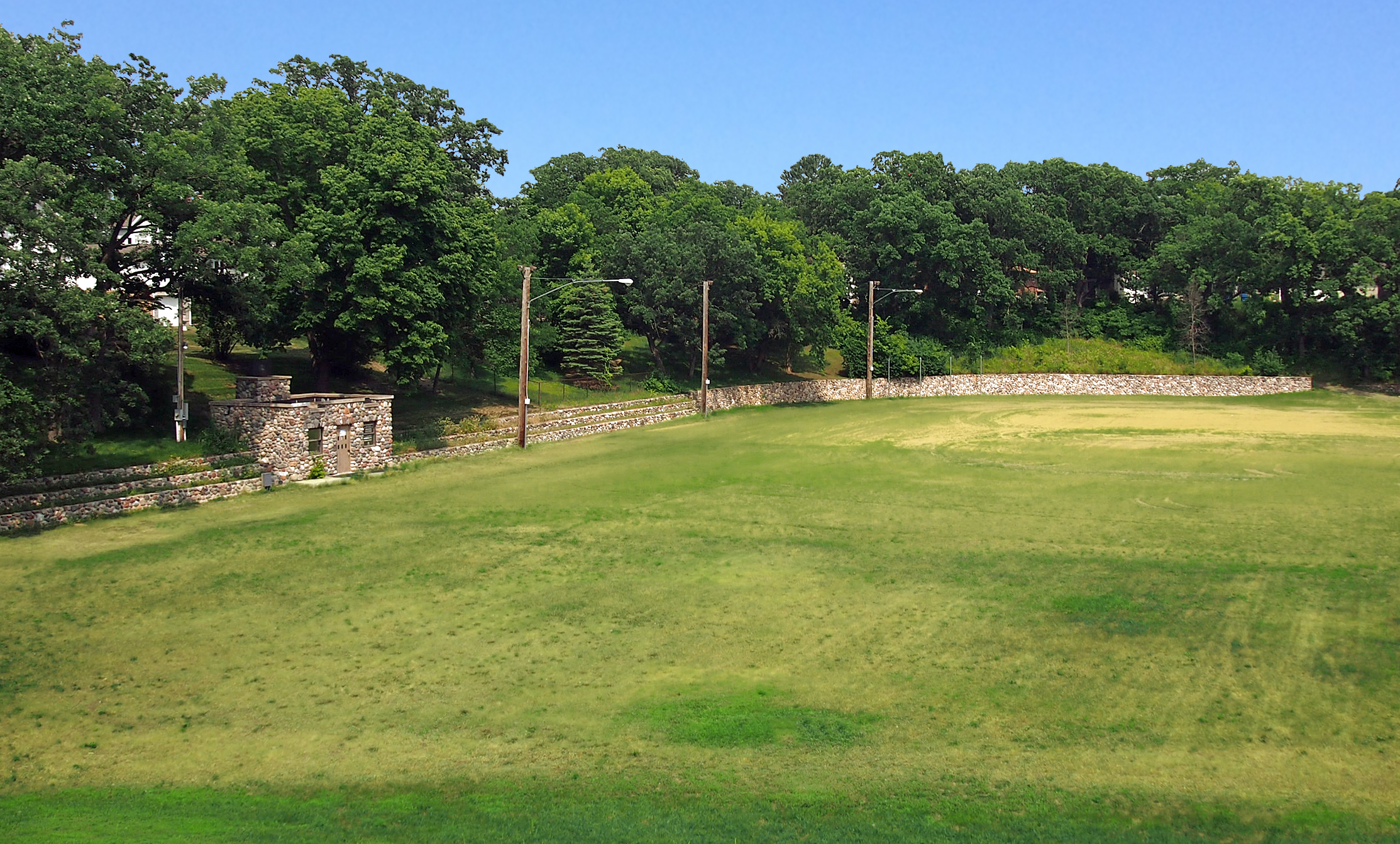
- The Elkhi Stadium viewed from the west

- Location within Minnesota Location within the United States
- Location: 1133 4th Street NW, Elk River, Minnesota
- Coordinates: 45°18′17″N 93°34′31″W
- Area: 1.5 acres (0.61 ha)
- Built: 1922, 1929, 1940
- Built by: National Youth Administration
- Architect: Eugene E. Chase
- MPS: Federal Relief Construction in Minnesota, 1933–1941
- NRHP reference No.: 04000540
- Added to NRHP: May 26, 2004

Elkhi Stadium, also known as Handke Stadium and locally nicknamed "the Pit", is an outdoor sports venue in Elk River, Minnesota, United States. It was begun with community labor in 1922 and improved by the National Youth Administration in 1940. It was listed on the National Register of Historic Places in 2004 for its significance in the themes of entertainment/recreation and politics/government. It was nominated for charting local efforts to enhance a community resource by mobilizing available labor, institutions, building materials, and ultimately federal New Deal funding, benefiting the community with youth employment and an enduring civic asset.

== Description ==
Elkhi Stadium consists of a regulation-size athletic field in a natural depression, surrounded by a fieldstone retaining wall varying from one to five feet high. Additional short tiers on the north and west sides created stadium bench seating, though some have since been covered over with earth fill to create a smooth slope. The north side also has a small fieldstone building with a 22-by-16-foot (6.7 by 4.9 m) footprint. Used as a warming hut during winter activities, the interior contains a 16-foot-long (4.9 m) hearth with benches along the other three sides.

== History ==
The site of Elkhi Stadium was originally a large seasonal pond with steep wooded banks. Elk River's first high school was established next to it in 1898. For over two decades the basin was mainly used for ice skating and sledding. In 1921 a group of about a dozen boys, lamenting that the school had no athletic field, got permission from the newly elected district superintendent to fill in the pond for a football field. Though the district could not provide any money or material, the effort quickly snowballed. On weekends over the next two years, students from area farms lent wagons, horses, and shovels to bring in fill. Adults began pitching in as well. The new field was officially dedicated in May 1925. The name "Elkhi" was selected by the student body in a vote.

More formal organization attended a second effort in 1929. Under the direction of a new district superintendent, and with logistical support from the Elk River Commercial Club, donations and volunteer labor were raised to haul in 2,000 yards of additional fill to enlarge the football field to regulation size. The work largely took place over two days in August.

Two months later the nation plunged into the Great Depression. Beginning in 1933, federal job creation programs established by the Franklin D. Roosevelt administration provided funds for local infrastructure projects. In 1939 Elk River submitted a successful application to the National Youth Administration (NYA) to improve Elkhi Field once more. This secured funding for 40 unemployed high school graduates, while the school district contributed $1,200 to pay for a foreman (a local engineer named Gene Chase) and materials (largely fieldstone, an abundant nuisance in area cropland). Under Chase, the crew reshaped the sides and built paths, steps, and retaining walls over several months. They also built tennis courts, removed old debris, and planted trees around the site. Since the stadium was still used as an ice rink in winter, a local civic group contributed extra funds to build the warming house. The improved Elkhi Stadium was dedicated on September 5, 1940.

For decades the stadium hosted football and hockey games, physical education, band concerts, and an annual homecoming bonfire. By the end of the 20th century, years of deferred maintenance had left the stone walls crumbling, the steps and warming house unsafe, and the hillsides choked with undergrowth. A suggestion to fill the site with dirt and redevelop it was defeated by community outcry. Local generosity again benefited the site. From 2000 to 2006, Elk River's Rotary Club repaired and improved the stadium, raising money through fundraisers, donations, and grants. The walls, steps, and warming house were repaired with donated stone. A gas fireplace, safety railing, and period lighting were installed. A new plaza at the southeast entrance sports the Rotary Club seal and Handke School's original school bell. Elkhi Stadium continues to serve as a popular outdoor skating rink.

== See also ==
- National Register of Historic Places listings in Sherburne County, Minnesota
