= Champlin Park High School =

Location
- 6025 109th Avenue North; Brooklyn Park, Minnesota 55443; United States; 45°09′01″N 93°21′18″W

Information
- Type: Public
- Established: 1992
- School district: Anoka-Hennepin School District 11
- Principal: Michael George
- Staff: 146.29 (FTE)
- Enrollment: 2,978 (2023–2024)
- Student to teacher ratio: 20.36
- Colors: Navy blue, silver, and white
- Athletics conference: Northwest Suburban Conference
- Nickname: Rebels
- Newspaper: Rebel Report
- Website: cphs.ahschools.us

Champlin Park High School is a four-year public high school in Brooklyn Park, Minnesota, United States.

The school's name comes from the combination of Brooklyn Park and Champlin.

Champlin Park's first graduating class was in 1993. CPHS is the third-largest high school in the state, with a student population of 2975.

Champlin Park serves the cities of Champlin, Brooklyn Park, Brooklyn Center and Dayton. In the spring of 2006, Champlin Park was certified to teach the International Baccalaureate Diploma Program.

The school principal is Michael George.

In 2012, 2013 and 2014, Champlin Park High School received recognition as a “Newsweek Top School,” a distinction recognizing the top high schools across the country.

The school runs on a five-period, trimester curriculum.

== Sports ==
Champlin Park competes in the Northwest Suburban Conference.

In 2018 the Champlin Park volleyball team won the school's first state championship in any sport.

=== In school ===
During the 2010–11 school year, the students held a blanket drive (collecting blankets for those in need) for "Blankets for Bridging" and won a concert by "The Ready Set."

The school has a reading program each summer called the Red Hot Rebel Read. The book for 2011 was Hold Still by Nina LaCour. She visited the school on October 13 and 14. The program was cancelled in 2021 when Garfield At Large was selected as the Red Hot Rebel Read.

=== Other activities ===
Tennis (men's and women's), Ice hockey (men's and women's), Lacrosse (men's and women's), Football, Basketball (men's and women's), Baseball, Softball, Soccer (men's and women's), Volleyball, Disc Golf, Track, Cross Country, Golf, Bowling, Swimming (men's and women's), Golf, Tennis, Alpine & Nordic Ski, Adapted Floor Hockey, Cheerleading, Dance Team, Gymnastics, Strength Training, Wrestling, Speech, Art, Debate and more.

== Music and fine arts ==
In 2009, the Champlin Park Orchestra earned a spot in the Field Studies International Band and Orchestra Festival, performing at Carnegie Hall in New York City. The choir program consists of Concert Choir, Treble Choir, Varsity Choir, Bel Canto and Con Brio . There are six bands in the CPHS music program: Symphonic Band, Concert Band, Varsity Band, Jazz Band, Marching Band, and Pep Band.

== Controversies ==
An article involving a few Champlin Park High School students as well as others in the district was published in Rolling Stone in February 2012, regarding a number of suicides surrounding the Anoka-Hennepin School district involving LGBT students.

== Notable alumni ==
- Jamie Hersch – American journalist for NHL Network and the MLB Network
- Ramon Humber – NFL linebacker
- McKinley Wright IV – Minnesota Timberwolves point guard
