= Paul McCarron =

American politician

Paul McCarron (April 5, 1934 – August 11, 2013) was an American businessman and politician.

Born in Minneapolis, Minnesota, McCarron served in the United States Navy and then went to the University of St. Thomas. McCarron was president and general manager of McGregor Agri-Corp Inc.

In 1979, McCarron was elected to the Spring Lake Park, Minnesota City Council. From 1973 to 1983, he served in the Minnesota House of Representatives and was a Democrat. In 1982, he was elected an Anoka County, Minnesota commissioner.

McCarron died in Spring Lake Park City, Minnesota of heart failure.
