= Stephanie Klinzing =

American journalist and politician

Stephanie Klinzing (born October 31, 1949, in Solon Springs, Wisconsin) is an American journalist and politician.

Klinzing lives in Elk River, Sherburne County, Minnesota. She went to University of Wisconsin–Superior. Kinzing was a journalist and worked for the Osseo Maple Grove Press, Crow River News, and Elk River Star News newspaper. Klinzing served in the Minnesota House of Representatives in 1993 and 1994 and was a Democrat. She also served as mayor of Elk River and on the Sherburne County Board of Commissioners. Klinzing also serves on the Minnesota Board on Aging, Minnesota Housing Finance Agency Board of Directors, the Greater Minnesota Housing Fund Board of Directors, and the Adams/ECM Editorial Board.
