= Elk River, Minnesota =

City in Minnesota, United States

- City
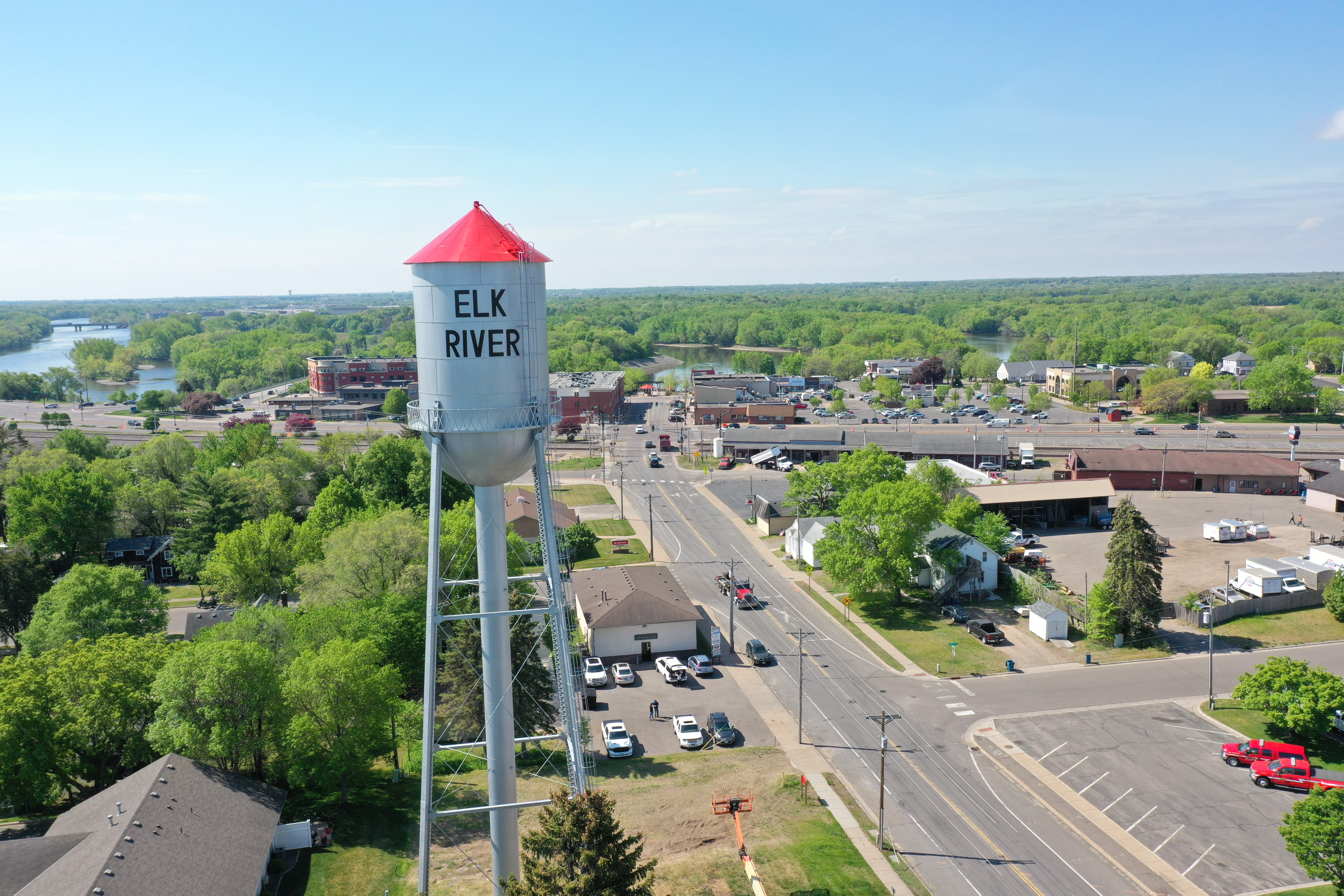
- Aerial view of Elk River
- Nicknames: Energy City, Powered By Nature
- Interactive map of Elk River, Minnesota
- Location within Minnesota
- Coordinates: 45.3322°N 93.5665°W
- Country: United States
- State: Minnesota
- County: Sherburne
- Platted: 1865
- Replatted: 1868
- Incorporated (village): February 19, 1881
- Incorporated (city): February 6, 1911
- Named for: the nearby Elk River

Government
  - Type: Council–Manager
  - Mayor: John J. Dietz
  - City Administrator: Calvin Portner
  - Councilmembers: Cory Grupa; J. Brian Calva; Mike Beyer; Jennifer Wagner

Area
  - City: 43.810 sq mi (113.467 km^{2})
  - Land: 42.326 sq mi (109.625 km^{2})
  - Water: 1.484 sq mi (3.844 km^{2}) 3.39%
- Elevation: 1,050 ft (320 m)

Population (2020)
  - City: 25,835
  - Estimate (2025): 27,896
  - Rank: MN: 38th
  - Density: 610.37/sq mi (235.67/km^{2})
  - Urban: 2,914,866 (US: 16th)
  - Metro: 3,790,295 (US: 16th)
- Time zone: UTC–6 (Central (CST))
  - Summer (DST): UTC–5 (CDT)
- ZIP Code: 55330
- Area code: 763
- FIPS code: 27-18674
- GNIS feature ID: 2394650
- Highways: US 10, MN 101, US 169
- Website: elkrivermn.gov

Elk River is a city and the county seat of Sherburne County, Minnesota, United States, about 34 miles northwest of Minneapolis. It is at the confluence of the Mississippi and Elk Rivers. The population was 25,835 as of the 2020 census, and was estimated at 27,896 in 2025, making Elk River the second-largest city in the Central Minnesota region after St. Cloud. U.S. Highways 10 and 169 and State Highway 101 are three of the main routes in Elk River. Elk River is 33.2 miles northwest of Minneapolis and 37.4 miles southeast of St. Cloud.

== History ==
The last glacier to traverse Minnesota is responsible for the creation of the hardwood-forested hills where Elk River is nestled. These hills are made up of coarse materials, which is why gravel mining is so prevalent in Elk River, and also why much of the area is not considered good farmland for culture and agriculture use.

To the south of Elk River lies the prairie. This natural boundary between the prairie and woods was also a boundary between Indian nations. Two battles between the Dakota and Ojibwe took place where the Elk River meets the Mississippi in 1772 and 1773.

=== Rivers ===
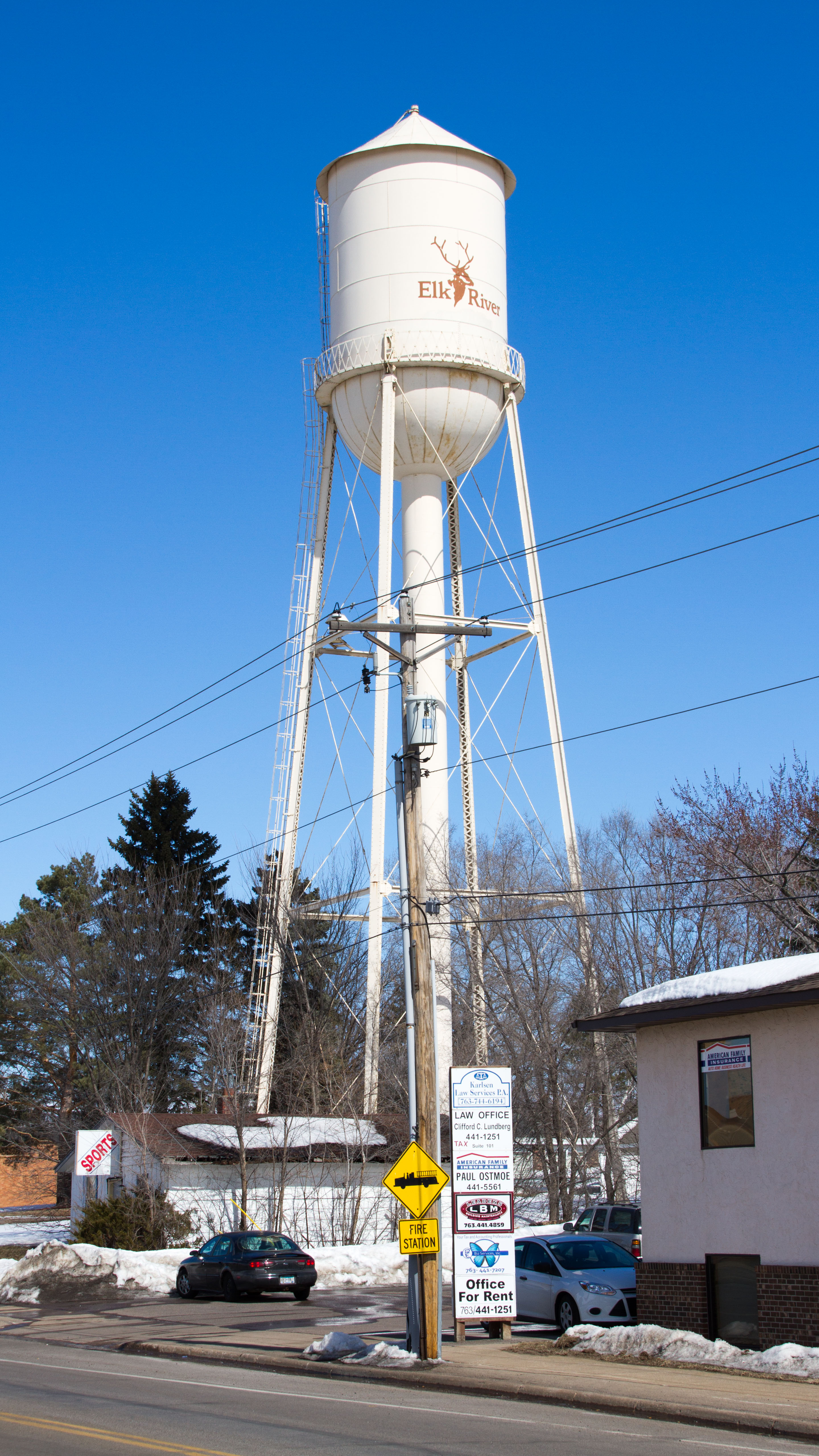
The Elk River Water Tower was placed on the National Register of Historic Places in 2012.

Zebulon Pike passed through the area on his 1805 exploration of the Upper Mississippi River and named the Elk River after the herds of elk he saw in the area. David Frederic Faribault, son of French-Canadian fur trader Jean-Baptiste Faribault, built a trading post near the confluence of the Elk and Mississippi Rivers in 1846, which he sold in 1848 to H. M. Rice and S. P. Folsom. Folsom moved his family to the place and built a log cabin. French fur trader and guide Pierre Bottineau bought the post and cabin from Folsom. The trading post stood on a bluff just north of the present-day bridge across the Elk River on Main Street. In 1850, Bottineau built a hotel on the bank of the Mississippi about half a mile below the mouth of the Elk. The two rivers and the Red River Trail, which passed nearby, made this area a good location for commerce.

Silas Lane opened a farm near the old trading post site, making his claim in section 33 in 1850. Many early settlers came from Maine and nearly all of them were experts in lumbering. In 1851, Ard Godfrey and John C. Jamieson, a native of Orono, Maine, saw the potential of the water power of the Elk River and purchased the claim from Lane. They built a dam and a sawmill. Their dam created the first lobe of Lake Orono (called the Mill Pond), which extended from the present-day dam to Orono Cemetery Point. In 1855, the area by the dam was platted and the town of Orono (known as Upper Town) was created.

In the latter half of the 19th century, agriculture and dairy farming replaced lumber as the base of Elk River's economy. Grist mills and a starch factory, which took advantage of the potato fields to the west, were built.

The Orono-Elk River area continued to grow until by 1860 it had reached a population of 723. These early settlers mostly came from New England. Elk River's population continued to grow following a slow period caused by the Civil War. Most people moving to Elk River by that time were from Northern Europe.

The village of Elk River was platted in 1865, replatted in 1868, and when incorporated in the winter of 1880–81, included both Orono and Elk River. By 1870, Elk River had a population of 2,050. It became the county seat in 1872. Around this time, railroads replaced the rivers as the main focus of transportation and the Lower Town (the present-day historic downtown area) replaced Upper Town as the focus of commerce.

The Orono Dam was destroyed by an ice storm in 1912, but hydropower gave a new incentive to dam the Elk River in 1915. This new dam created the four lobes of Lake Orono as we know it today. In 1916, the Village of Elk River received electricity for the first time. The entire township of Elk River did not get electricity until after World War II.

=== Road transportation ===
Charles Babcock, a native son of Elk River and the first Commissioner of Highways for the state, had a visionary plan to "get Minnesota out of the mud." His plan to create a network of paved roads became a model for the rest of the nation and the Jefferson Highway (now Highway 10) became one of the state's first paved roads. Highway 10 used to cross the Elk River over the dam bridge, but was rerouted shortly after World War II.

Jackson Avenue used to be Highway 169. For years, the intersection of this road and Highway 10 was the only one with a stoplight in Elk River, and on major travel weekends, traffic backed up halfway to Anoka. Work on Highway 169 to bypass Elk River began in 1961. Work on a new route for Highway 101 between Rogers and Elk River began in 1968.

In 1974, the Village of Elk River became the City of Elk River. In 1978, the City of Elk River and the township of Elk River were consolidated to create one unit known as the City of Elk River as it exists today. The result was one of Minnesota's largest land-based cities, at 44 square miles.

Besides transportation, energy has always played a significant role in shaping Elk River. The first rural nuclear power plant in the United States went online in 1960 as Great River Energy's (GRE) site in Elk River. It was meant only as a demonstration site and was dismantled after several successful years of operation.

=== Energy City ===
In the late 1980s, GRE's power plant was converted to burn refuse-derived fuel. This innovative source of energy was one factor that contributed to Elk River being designated "Energy City" by the Minnesota Environmental Initiative in 1997. Minnesota's energy industries demonstrate cutting-edge renewable and energy-efficient technologies in Elk River.

By the 1990s, Elk River and Sherburne County were in one of the fastest-growing corridors in the state and the country. This population growth, combined with the area's high commuter rate, factored into the ultimate approval and implementation of the Northstar Commuter Rail service from Minneapolis to Big Lake, which began service on November 16, 2009.

==== Flag controversy ====
In 2026, the Elk River city council voted unanimously to fly the 1983 flag of Minnesota instead of the legal flag.

== Attractions ==
The City of Elk River has many amenities, offering a small-town feel but close enough to the Twin Cities and St. Cloud.

=== Handke Stadium ===
Also known as the Elkhi Stadium, it started its construction in 1921. It became a playing field for football and hockey rink in the winter. In 1939 workers built steps, stone retaining walls and a warming house with a fireplace. After a couple years, the Handke Stadium began to deteriorate and had to be shut down. The Elk River Rotary Club fundraised enough money that in 2000 they repaired the stadium. New warming house, wiring and the steps and stone have either been replaced or repaired. Since being newly reconstructed it had been included into the National Register of Historic Places.

=== Art ===
==== Downtown Murals ====
In 1991, K.S. "Bud" Houlton commissioned the painting of the first downtown mural. The mural, depicting the former buildings on the south side of Main Street circa 1960, captured the spirit when downtown was the center of the business community. Houlton had a great interest in local history and created the mural as a gift to the community. His son, John, clearly remembers the businesses depicted in the painting. He said the bakery and barbershop are still in operation today, but the business names have changed. The artist is Michael Russell.

In 2001, the Three Rivers Community Theater applied for a grant to assist in providing monies toward the painting of a mural of artistic and historical significance on the building adjacent to the River's Edge Park, at the intersection of Main Street and Jackson Avenue. This effort to have a mural painted was inspired by numerous community members, business owners, and public entities interested in downtown beautification and continuing to recognize the arts community of Elk River. The desire was to draw attention to the Mississippi River for its beauty and solace as well as its historical significance to Elk River. Local artist Frank Gosiak created and painted the mural.

==== Whimsical Windmill ====
The "Whimsical Windmill" is the art piece that was chosen in the Elk River Powered by Nature Art Contest. Artist Carl Zachmann from Fergus Falls created the piece in reminiscence of the windmills on farms that pump water. The gears and colors stand for the confluence of rivers, forest, and lumber that helped build Elk River, and a reminder of the prairie that helped the area's agriculture flourish. The windmill's base represents the river. The windmill is on the grounds of the Elk River Library.

==== Art ====
Elk River has always been a town energized by its local artists, showcasing talented residents. The Elk River Area Arts Alliance, founded in 1989, is a nonprofit organization that works with area businesses, government agencies, local schools, other arts organizations, and individual artists to provide arts experiences for area residents. The Arts Alliance is known for ArtSoup, Strings for Youth, and Arts in Harmony. It provides access to professional concerts, theater, dance, and visual arts experiences through Arts Explorations motor coach trips. The Arts Alliance also provides various workshops and has a family and arts center with community gathering space, classrooms, studios, and a gallery. It also offers professional concerts in a state-of-the-art theater at Elk River Area High School.

=== Furniture and Things Community Event Center ===
Completed in 2019, the Furniture and Things Community Event Center is near Elk River High School and offers skating to youth and adults, as well as a Spring and Fall Arts and Craft Fair and an arena walking track.

=== ERX Motor Park ===
ERX Motor Park is an all-season motorsports and events facility off of US Highway 169. It houses Grassroots Snocross, Beatercross, cross country snowmobile and dirt bike racing, off-road, concerts, corporate events, monster trucks, and rodeo.

=== Golf courses ===
The city has two golf courses: Pinewood Golf Course, a municipal nine-hole course, and Elk River Country Club, an 18-hole course.

=== Parks ===
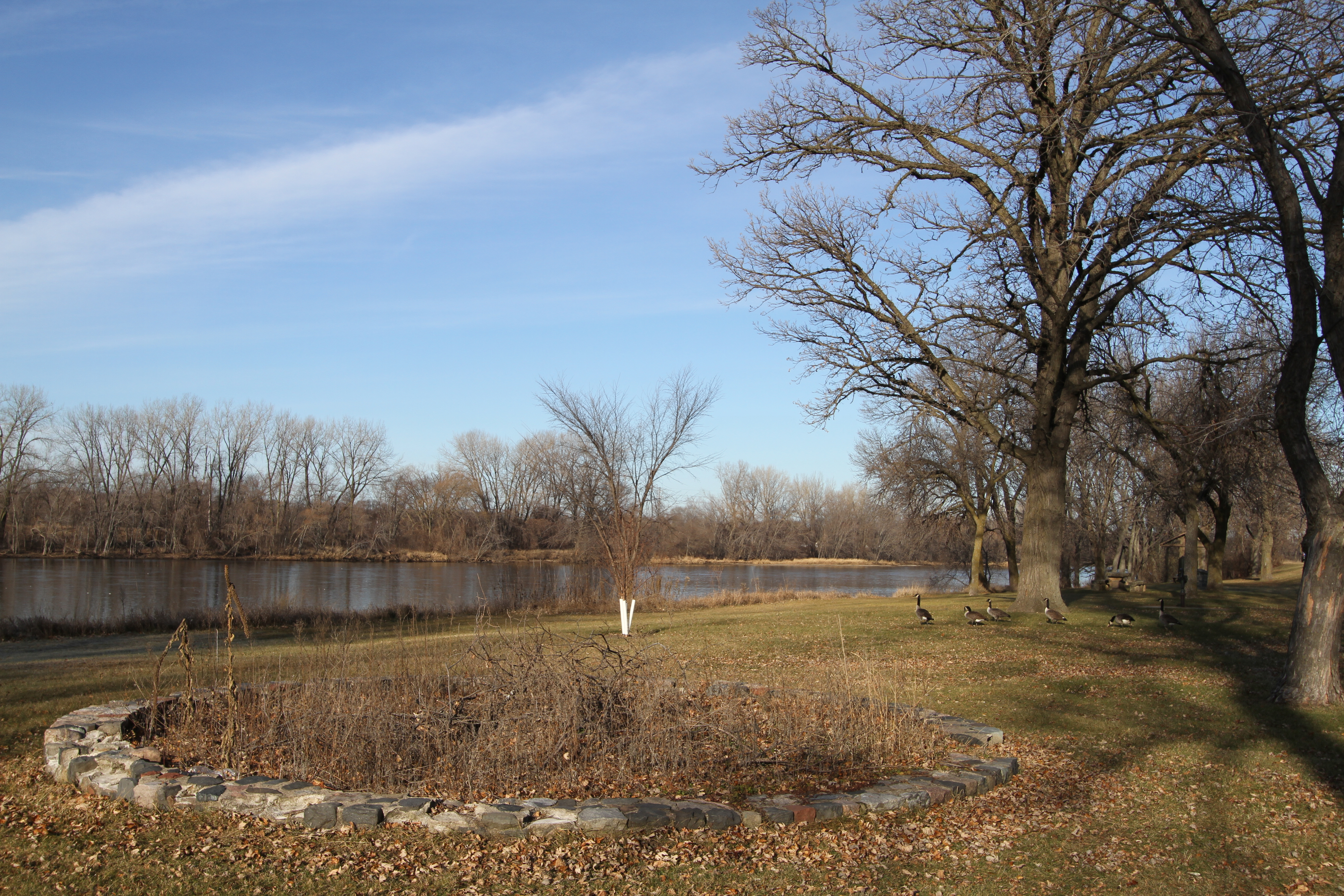
Babcock Memorial Park in Elk River

The City of Elk River has 41 parks and one conservation area with a total of 1,388 maintained acres.

=== Public library ===
The Elk River Public Library is part of the Great River Regional Library and is a LEED Gold Certified building.

== Transportation ==
Elk River has high traffic, particularly on weekends in the summer and fall as vacationers and hunters head north.

U.S. Highways 10 and 169 have their northwest juncture in Elk River, with the two highways concurrent for 12 miles until Anoka to the southeast. U.S. 10 continues northwesterly toward St. Cloud, and U.S. 169 continues due north toward Mille Lacs Lake from Elk River.

Minnesota Highway 101 has its northern terminus at the U.S. 10 / U.S. 169 split in Elk River and is a major route connecting these highways with Interstate 94, seven miles to the south.

Many residents of Elk River commute to the Twin Cities daily for work; it is roughly a 40-mile drive to Minneapolis. Elk River Station was served by the Northstar Commuter Rail line connecting the northwest suburbs and downtown Minneapolis; the line opened in November 2009 and closed in January 2026, replaced by a bus service.

=== Major highways ===
The following routes are located within the city of Elk River.

- U.S. Highway 10
- U.S. Highway 169
- Minnesota State Highway 101

== Geography ==
According to the United States Census Bureau, the city has an area of 43.810 square miles (113.47 km^{2}), of which 42.326 square miles (109.62 km^{2}) is land and 1.484 square miles (3.84 km^{2}) (3.39%) is water.

Elk River is bordered to the south by the Mississippi River. The Elk River meanders through Sherburne County to its terminus at the Mississippi River through the western side of Elk River, pausing at Lake Orono, created by a dam not far from its conjunction with the Mississippi River.

== Climate ==
Elk River has a hot summer humid continental climate (Köppen Dfa).

Climate data for Elk River, Minnesota, 1981–2010 normals, extremes 1942-present
Month	Jan	Feb	Mar	Apr	May	Jun	Jul	Aug	Sep	Oct	Nov	Dec	Year
Record high °F (°C)	55 (13)	62 (17)	79 (26)	84 (29)	99 (37)	102 (39)	98 (37)	95 (35)	94 (34)	85 (29)	73 (23)	56 (13)	102 (39)
Mean daily maximum °F (°C)	23.1 (−4.9)	28.0 (−2.2)	39.8 (4.3)	57.7 (14.3)	69.5 (20.8)	78.5 (25.8)	83.3 (28.5)	80.6 (27.0)	71.3 (21.8)	57.5 (14.2)	40.3 (4.6)	26.4 (−3.1)	54.7 (12.6)
Daily mean °F (°C)	13.2 (−10.4)	17.6 (−8.0)	29.9 (−1.2)	46.5 (8.1)	58.2 (14.6)	67.9 (19.9)	72.9 (22.7)	70.2 (21.2)	60.7 (15.9)	47.1 (8.4)	32.3 (0.2)	18.3 (−7.6)	44.6 (7.0)
Mean daily minimum °F (°C)	3.2 (−16.0)	7.1 (−13.8)	20.0 (−6.7)	35.3 (1.8)	46.8 (8.2)	57.2 (14.0)	62.5 (16.9)	59.7 (15.4)	50.1 (10.1)	36.7 (2.6)	24.3 (−4.3)	10.2 (−12.1)	34.4 (1.3)
Record low °F (°C)	−40 (−40)	−29 (−34)	−20 (−29)	4 (−16)	25 (−4)	40 (4)	37 (3)	46 (8)	30 (−1)	18 (−8)	−3 (−19)	−30 (−34)	−40 (−40)
Average precipitation inches (mm)	0.73 (19)	0.74 (19)	1.66 (42)	3.02 (77)	3.47 (88)	4.48 (114)	4.39 (112)	3.98 (101)	3.98 (101)	2.80 (71)	1.66 (42)	0.95 (24)	31.86 (810)
Average snowfall inches (cm)	7.7 (20)	7.0 (18)	7.4 (19)	3.5 (8.9)	0 (0)	0 (0)	0 (0)	0 (0)	0 (0)	0.2 (0.51)	6.5 (17)	7.2 (18)	39.5 (101.41)
Average precipitation days (≥ 0.01 in)	6.3	4.8	6.8	8.4	10.0	9.8	9.0	8.3	8.3	8.2	6.5	6.0	92.4
Average snowy days (≥ 0.1 in)	6	4	3	1	0	0	0	0	0	0	3	5	22
Source: National Oceanic and Atmospheric Administration

== Demographics ==
Historical population
Census	Pop.	Note	%±
1860	233		—
1870	537		130.5%
1880	895		66.7%
1890	1,068		19.3%
1900	1,346		26.0%
1910	1,407		4.5%
1920	1,667		18.5%
1930	1,659		−0.5%
1940	1,955		17.8%
1950	2,082		6.5%
1960	2,749		32.0%
1970	4,098		49.1%
1980	6,785		65.6%
1990	11,143		64.2%
2000	16,447		47.6%
2010	22,974		39.7%
2020	25,835		12.5%
2025 (est.)	27,896		8.0%
U.S. Decennial Census; 2020 Census

According to realtor website Zillow, the average price of a home as of August 31, 2026, in Elk River was $399,244.

As of the 2024 American Community Survey, there were 9,835 estimated households in Elk River with an average of 2.66 persons per household. The city has a median household income of $108,741. Approximately 3.4% of the city's population lives at or below the poverty line. Elk River has an estimated 71.4% employment rate, with 33.8% of the population holding a bachelor's degree or higher and 94.9% holding a high school diploma. There were 10,214 housing units at an average density of 241.32 per square mile (93.17/km^{2}).

The top five reported languages (people were allowed to report up to two languages, thus the figures will generally add to more than 100%) were English (93.7%), Spanish (2.3%), Indo-European (1.2%), Asian and Pacific Islander (1.3%), and Other (1.5%).

The median age in the city was 37.2 years.

Elk River, Minnesota – racial and ethnic composition Note: the US Census treats Hispanic/Latino as an ethnic category. This table excludes Latinos from the racial categories and assigns them to a separate category. Hispanics/Latinos may be of any race.
Race / ethnicity (NH = non-Hispanic)
Race / ethnicity (NH = non-Hispanic)	Population 1980		Population 1990		Population 2000		Population 2010		Population 2020	
Race / ethnicity (NH = non-Hispanic)	Number	Percent	Number	Percent	Number	Percent	Number	Percent	Number	Percent
White alone (NH)	6,622	97.60%	10,942	98.20%	15,857	96.41%	20,950	91.19%	21,979	85.07%
Black or African American alone (NH)	4	0.06%	19	0.17%	70	0.43%	417	1.82%	1,061	4.11%
Native American or Alaska Native alone (NH)	41	0.60%	50	0.45%	60	0.36%	90	0.39%	134	0.52%
Asian alone (NH)	23	0.34%	49	0.44%	80	0.49%	382	1.66%	456	1.77%
Pacific Islander alone (NH)	×	×	×	×	2	0.01%	7	0.03%	6	0.02%
Other race alone (NH)	44	0.65%	0	0.00%	9	0.05%	20	0.09%	83	0.32%
Mixed race or multiracial (NH)	×	×	×	×	150	0.91%	390	1.70%	1,125	4.35%
Hispanic or Latino (any race)	51	0.75%	83	0.74%	219	1.33%	718	3.13%	991	3.83%
Total	6,785	100.00%	11,143	100.00%	16,447	100.00%	22,974	100.00%	25,835	100.00%

=== 2020 census ===
As of the 2020 census, there were 25,835 people, 9,134 households, and 6,651 families residing in the city. The population density was 610.34 inhabitants per square mile (235.65/km^{2}). There were 9,474 housing units at an average density of 223.82 per square mile (86.42/km^{2}). The racial makeup of the city was 85.92% White, 4.11% African American, 0.58% Native American, 1.79% Asian, 0.02% Pacific Islander, 1.50% from some other races and 6.07% from two or more races. Hispanic or Latino people of any race were 3.84% of the population.

=== 2010 census ===
As of the 2010 census, there were 22,974 people, 8,080 households, and 6,050 families residing in the city. The population density was 543.25 inhabitants per square mile (209.75/km^{2}). There were 8,542 housing units at an average density of 201.99 per square mile (77.99/km^{2}). The racial makeup of the city was 93.37% White, 1.93% African American, 0.41% Native American, 1.67% Asian, 0.03% Pacific Islander, 0.67% from some other races and 1.92% from two or more races. Hispanic or Latino people of any race were 3.13% of the population.

There were 8,080 households, of which 42.1% had children under the age of 18 living with them, 61.1% were married couples living together, 9.5% had a female householder with no husband present, 4.3% had a male householder with no wife present, and 25.1% were non-families. 19.6% of all households were made up of individuals, and 7.6% had someone living alone who was 65 years of age or older. The average household size was 2.76 and the average family size was 3.18.

The median age in the city was 34.9 years. 28.5% of residents were under the age of 18; 7.7% were between the ages of 18 and 24; 29.5% were from 25 to 44; 24.9% were from 45 to 64; and 9.3% were 65 years of age or older. The gender makeup of the city was 50.2% male and 49.8% female.

=== 2000 census ===
As of the 2000 census, there were 16,447 people, 5,664 households, and 4,400 families residing in the city. The population density was 385.55 inhabitants per square mile (148.86/km^{2}). There were 5,782 housing units at an average density of 135.54 per square mile (52.33/km^{2}). The racial makeup of the city was 97.18% White, 0.43% African American, 0.37% Native American, 0.49% Asian, 0.01% Pacific Islander, 0.48% from some other races and 1.02% from two or more races. Hispanic or Latino people of any race were 1.33% of the population. 39.0% were of German, 14.7% Norwegian, 7.7% Swedish, and 6.8% Irish ancestry.

There were 5,664 households, out of which 45.5% had children under the age of 18 living with them, 64.7% were married couples living together, 9.2% had a female householder with no husband present, and 22.3% were non-families. 17.2% of all households were made up of individuals, and 7.0% had someone living alone who was 65 years of age or older. The average household size was 2.85 and the average family size was 3.24.

In the city, the population was spread out, with 31.3% under the age of 18, 8.5% from 18 to 24, 33.9% from 25 to 44, 18.3% from 45 to 64, and 8.0% who were 65 years of age or older. The median age was 32 years. For every 100 females, there were 100.9 males. For every 100 females age 18 and over, there were 96.8 males.

The median income for a household in the city was $58,114, and the median income for a family was $65,471. Males had a median income of $43,230 versus $30,023 for females. The per capita income for the city was $21,808. About 2.5% of families and 3.2% of the population were below the poverty line, including 2.9% of those under age 18 and 4.6% of those age 65 or over.

== In popular culture ==
The 2007 coming-of-age film Juno is set in Elk River. The film was initially to be filmed in Minnesota, but was ultimately filmed in and around Vancouver, Canada.

== Education ==
Elk River is in the Independent School District 728.

Elk River is served by two grade 9-12 public high schools, Elk River High School and Ivan Sand Community High School, and one grade 5–12 school, Spectrum High School. Two middle schools, Salk Middle School and VandenBerge Middle School, both of which serve grade 6–8. Lincoln Elementary, Parker Elementary, Meadowvale Elementary and Twin Lakes Elementary serve kindergarten to grade 5.

Elk River is also served by a private school, St. Andrew's Catholic School, which currently teaches kindergarten through grade 5 and is paid for mostly by parishioners. Handke Center is a school that teaches kindergarten through grade 8 or community education. Solid Rock Christian Academy is a private school committed to Christian education which teaches grades Pre-K–12.

== Notable people ==
- Emma Bates – professional marathoner
- Dorothy Brady – Mathematician and economist, former professor of economics at Wharton School of the University of Pennsylvania
- Margaret Frazer – historical novelist
- Dan Hinote – Former professional ice hockey player
- Oliver Hudson Kelley, founder of the National Grange of the Order of Patrons of Husbandry
- Matt Kiersted – Professional hockey player
- Stephanie Klinzing – Minnesota state legislator and former mayor of Elk River
- Michael Kurilla – US Army general and commander of the United States Central Command
- Paul Martin – Former professional ice hockey player
- Dave Mordal – Contestant on the first and third seasons of Last Comic Standing and host of the Discovery Channel's Wreckreation Nation
- Nancy Mudge – Former professional baseball player in the AAGPBL
- Joel Otto – Former professional ice hockey player
- Nick Perbix – Professional hockey player
- Nate Prosser – Former professional hockey player
- Laura Ryan – International competitive diver
