= Brian Leonhardt =

American football player (born 1990)

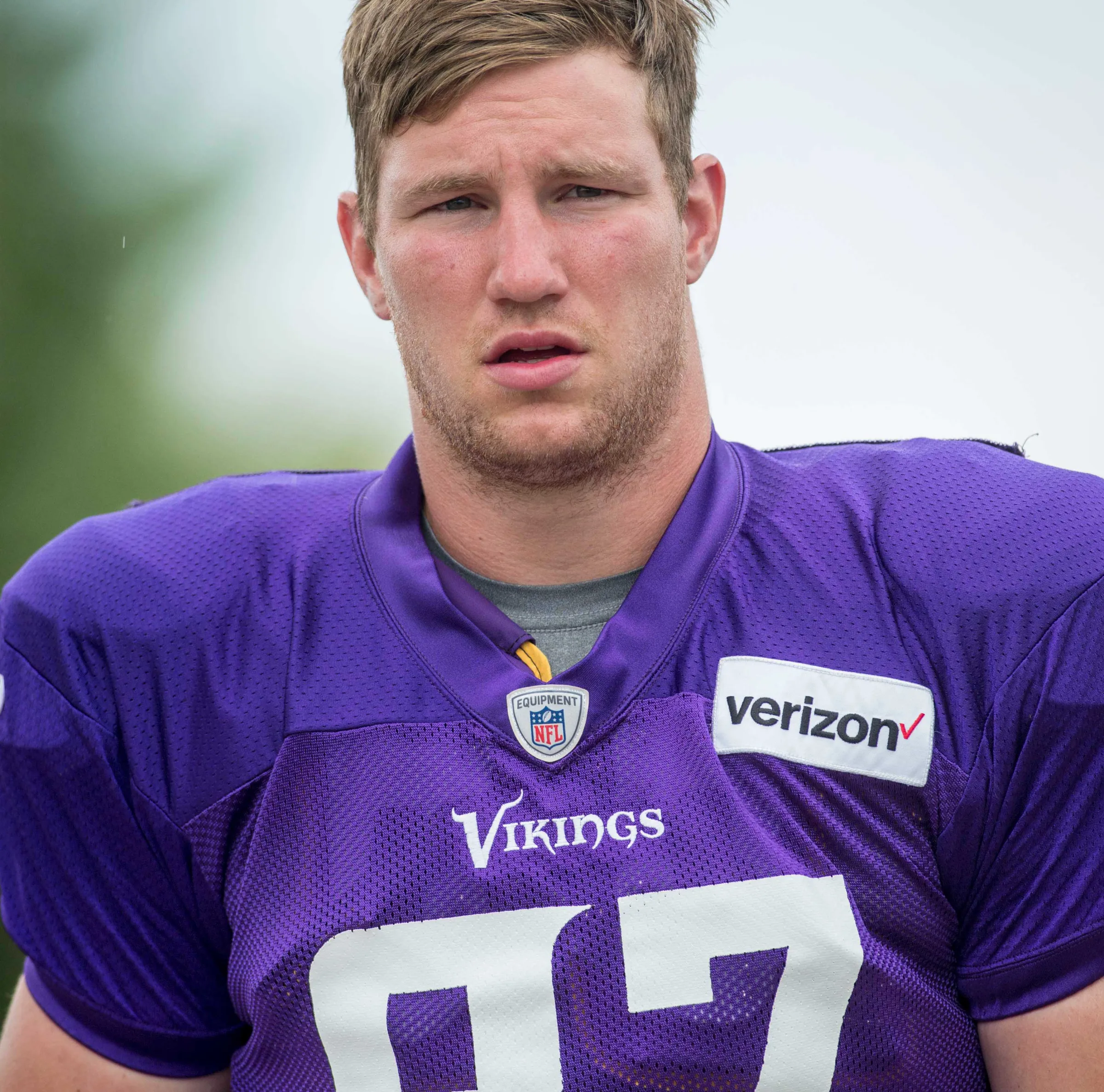
- Brain Leonhardt in 2016

No. 87, 46
- Position: Tight end

Personal information
- Born: April 2, 1990 (age 36); Blaine, Minnesota, U.S.
- Listed height: 6 ft 5 in (1.96 m)
- Listed weight: 255 lb (116 kg)

Career information
- High school: Spring Lake Park (Spring Lake Park, Minnesota)
- College: Bemidji State
- NFL draft: 2013: undrafted

Career history
- Oakland Raiders (2013–2014); Cleveland Browns (2015)*; San Francisco 49ers (2015); Minnesota Vikings (2016)*; Detroit Lions (2016)*; Minnesota Vikings (2016)*; Arizona Cardinals (2016)*
- * Offseason or practice squad member only

Career NFL statistics
- Receptions: 7
- Receiving yards: 39
- Receiving touchdowns: 1
- Stats at Pro Football Reference

Brian Leonhardt (born April 2, 1990) is an American former professional football player who was a tight end in the National Football League (NFL). He was signed by the Oakland Raiders as an undrafted free agent in 2013. He played college football for the Bemidji State Beavers.

== Early life ==
Leonhardt is a native of Spring Lake Park, Minnesota and went to Spring Lake Park High School .

== College career ==
In his junior season at Bemidji State University, he was selected for Daktronics All-America Second-team, Super Region #3 First-team and the All-NSIC First-team. He also was D2Football.com All-America Honorable Mention following the season.

== Professional career ==
=== Oakland Raiders ===
On April 28, 2013, he signed with the Oakland Raiders as an undrafted free agent.

=== Cleveland Browns ===
On July 30, 2015, Leonhardt signed with the Cleveland Browns.

=== San Francisco 49ers ===
On November 16, 2015, the San Francisco 49ers signed Leonhardt off of the Browns practice squad, to their own. On December 12, 2015, Leonhardt was promoted to the 49ers' active roster.

=== Minnesota Vikings (first stint) ===
On March 18, 2016, Leonhardt signed with the Minnesota Vikings. He was released on August 29, 2016.

=== Detroit Lions ===
On September 3, 2016, Leonhardt was signed to the Detroit Lions' practice squad. He was released on September 30, 2016.

=== Minnesota Vikings (second stint) ===
On October 5, 2016, Leonhardt re-signed with the Vikings. He was released on October 25, 2016.

=== Arizona Cardinals ===
Leonhardt was signed to the Cardinals' practice squad on November 1, 2016.
