= Wreckreation Nation =

- Starring: Dave Mordal
- Original language: English
- No. of seasons: 1
- No. of episodes: 13

Production
- Running time: 60 minutes per episode

Original release
- Network: Discovery Channel
- Release: January 6 – March 31, 2009

Wreckreation Nation is a travel/reality television show on the Discovery Channel, highlighting unusual recreational activities and amateur competitions across the United States. It is hosted by Dave Mordal.

The show debuted on January 6, 2009.

== Episodes ==
No.	Title	Original release date
1	"Lawn Mower Racing"	January 6, 2009
Lawn mower racing, Alligator wrestling school, Chess boxing
2	"Rock Crawling"	January 13, 2009
Rock crawling, TugFest - a Tug of war contest across the Mississippi River, Catfish catching
3	"Demolition Derby"	January 20, 2009
Demolition derby, Dagorhir Battle Games, Pumpkin boat racing.
4	"Figure 8 racing"	January 27, 2009
Figure 8 racing, Cowboy Action Shooting, Bishop Castle
5	"Mini-moto"	February 3, 2009
Mini-moto racing, Lumberjack competition, World Zombie Day/Zombiewalk
6	"Bigfoot Paintball"	February 10, 2009
Scenario paintball, Cardboard boat race, Troy Hurtubise
7	"Bonneville"	February 17, 2009
Rodeo Bullfighter school, Bonneville Speedway, Freestyle Canoeing
8	"Swamp Buggy"	February 24, 2009
Swamp buggy racing, Firefest, Alex Astilean - Unusual exercise equipment inventor
9	"Punkin' Chunkin'"	March 3, 2009
Punkin' Chunkin', Explosive target shooting< - shooting at everyday items that have been filled with an explosive, Jason Garfield - founder of the World Juggling Federation
10	"Soapbox Racing"	March 10, 2009
Outlaw Soapbox racing, Falconry, Great Fruitcake Toss
11	"Vintage Snowmobile Racing"	March 17, 2009
Vintage snowmobiling, Mouse trap-style Rube Goldberg device made out of ice, Adult Dodgeball
12	"Tank-Athalon"	March 24, 2009
Tank Olympics, Innespace Seabreacher, Human Dog Sled Competition
13	"Bar Stool Sledding"	March 31, 2009
Bar stool sledding, Sniper school in Arizona, Skijoring
