= David Backes =

American ice hockey player (born 1984)

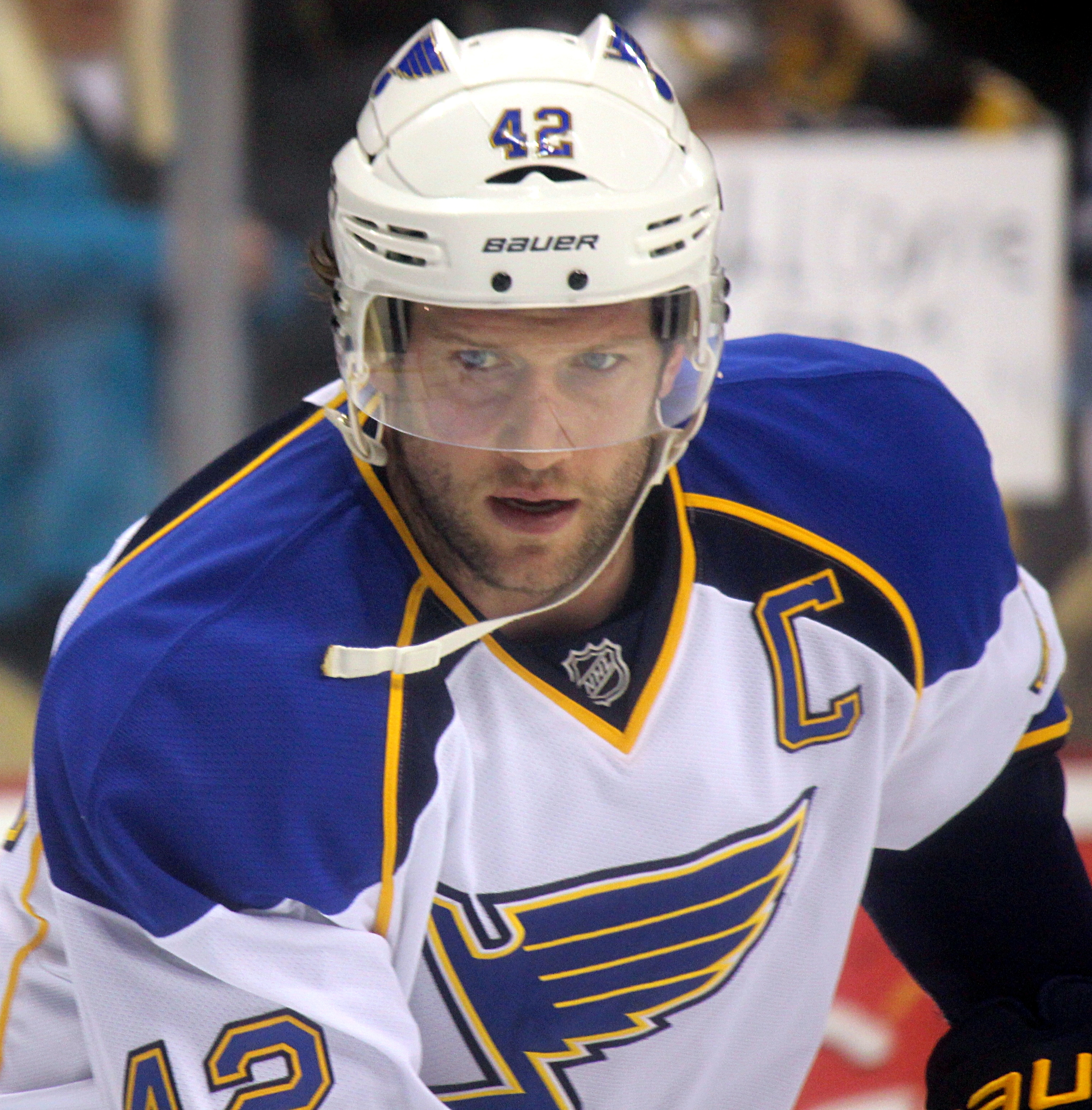
- Backes with the St. Louis Blues in March 2014
- Born: May 1, 1984 (age 42) Minneapolis, Minnesota, U.S.
- Height: 6 ft 3 in (191 cm)
- Weight: 215 lb (98 kg; 15 st 5 lb)
- Position: Centre/Right wing
- Shot: Right
- Played for: St. Louis Blues; Boston Bruins; Anaheim Ducks
- National team: United States
- NHL draft: 62nd overall, 2003; St. Louis Blues
- Playing career: 2005–2021
Medal record
Ice hockey
Representing the United States
Olympic Games
Silver medal – second place	2010 Vancouver

David Anthony Backes (born May 1, 1984) is an American former professional ice hockey forward. He played for fifteen seasons in the National Hockey League (NHL) as a member of the St. Louis Blues, Boston Bruins and Anaheim Ducks. Backes was born in Minneapolis, Minnesota, but grew up in Spring Lake Park, Minnesota.

After two seasons of junior hockey with the Lincoln Stars of the United States Hockey League, Backes was selected 62nd overall by the St. Louis Blues in the 2003 NHL entry draft. Following his draft, he joined the Minnesota State Mavericks men's hockey team of the Western Collegiate Hockey Association, spending three seasons in the college hockey ranks. Forgoing his senior year with the Mavericks, he turned professional with the Blues, joining their American Hockey League (AHL) affiliate, the Peoria Rivermen. Midway through the 2006–07 season, Backes was called up to the NHL and secured a roster spot with the Blues. Following his fifth season with St. Louis, he was chosen as team captain.

Internationally, Backes represents the United States. He is a two-time Olympian, winning silver at the 2010 Games in Vancouver, and has played in three IIHF World Championships.

== Playing career ==
=== Junior ===
Backes played three seasons of prep hockey with Spring Lake Park High School in Spring Lake Park, Minnesota, graduating in 2002. As a senior, he was named All-Conference, All-Metro, All-State and was a finalist for the 2002 Minnesota Mr. Hockey award, losing to Gino Guyer. He was joined on the Star Tribune's All-Metro First Team with future college teammate Travis Morin of the Dallas Stars. His high school team included future Minnesota Wild forward Jarod Palmer. His number 5 has been retired by the school and hangs at Fogerty Arena in Blaine, Minnesota.

After spending parts of two years in junior hockey with the Lincoln Stars of the USHL, Backes was selected in the second round, 62nd overall, by the St. Louis Blues in the 2003 NHL entry draft. Prior to joining the Blues, he played three seasons of college hockey at Minnesota State University, Mankato, where he was named to the 2005–06 Men's RBK Division I West All-America Second Team and the 2005–06 ESPN The Magazine Academic All-America First Team. Immediately after his third and final college season, he was signed by the Blues and assigned to the Peoria Rivermen of the AHL for the final 12 games of the 2005–06 season.

=== Professional ===
==== St. Louis Blues (2006–2016) ====
Following his first NHL training camp in September 2006, Backes was reassigned to the Rivermen, remaining in the AHL for the start of the 2006–07 season. Several months into the campaign, he was called up by the Blues and played his first NHL game against the Pittsburgh Penguins on December 19, 2006. Forty-four seconds into the game, Backes registered his first NHL point, a second-assist on a Doug Weight goal, giving the Blues a 1–0 lead. St. Louis went on to win the game 4–1, while Backes recorded 10 minutes of ice time. The following game, two days later, Backes scored his first NHL goal 10 minutes and 47 seconds into the first period versus the Los Angeles Kings. The goal came on a backhand shot past Kings goaltender Dan Cloutier, helping the Blues to a 5–2 win. A month into his initial stint with the Blues, he was reassigned to the Rivermen on January 21, 2007, for three days, after which he was recalled. Spending the remainder of the season with St. Louis, he completed his rookie season with 23 points (10 goals and 13 assists) in 49 games, while also recording 13 points (10 goals and three assists) in 31 games with Peoria. Among NHL rookies who had played at least half the season, Backes ranked 13th in points-per-game at 0.47.

In 2007–08, he completed his first full season in the NHL, improving to 31 points (13 goals and 18 assists). Becoming a restricted free agent in the off-season, Backes signed a three-year, US$7.5 million offer sheet with the Vancouver Canucks on July 1, 2008. The Blues quickly matched the offer, keeping Backes in St. Louis through the 2010–11 season. With a new contract, Backes tallied 54 points, including a career-high 31 goals, in 2008–09, finishing second behind former Bruins winger Brad Boyes among Blues scorers. He added 165 penalty minutes while playing in all 82 games for the first time in his career. During the season, he scored a career-high four goals on April 2, 2009, in a 5–4 win over the Detroit Red Wings. Backes' efforts helped the Blues reach the playoffs for the first time since 2004. Matching up against the Vancouver Canucks in the first round, the Blues were swept in four games. Backes recorded a goal and two assists in that span.

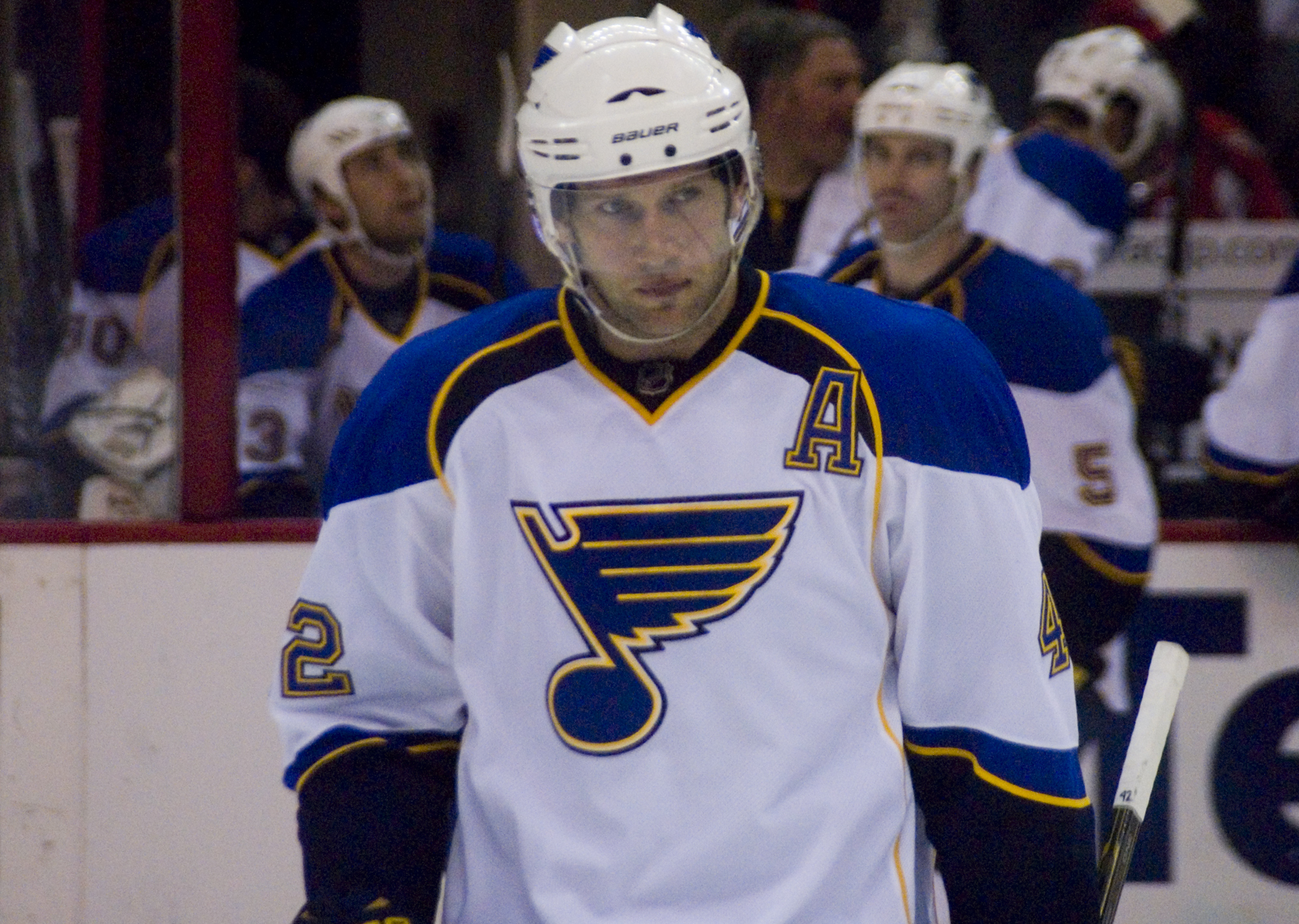
Backes during a game with the Blues in March 2011

In 2009–10, Backes' offensive production decreased to 17 goals and 31 assists for 48 points in 79 games. Following the retirement of Keith Tkachuk in the off-season, Backes took on the role of the alternate captain for 2010–11, the last season of his contract. A month into the campaign, on November 12, 2010, Backes signed a five-year, $22.5 million contract extension, keeping him with St. Louis through the 2015–16 season. Leading the Blues in scoring midway through the season, he was named to his first NHL All-Star Game in 2011. As the NHL adopted a draft to determine the teams for the first year, Backes was selected by Team Staal 33rd overall among 36 players. He recorded three assists in a losing effort, as Team Lidstrom won 11–10. Backes completed the season matching his personal best total of 31 goals, while adding 31 assists for a career-high and team-leading 62 points over 82 games. With a +32 rating, Backes came within one point of leading the league in plus-minus, behind Boston Bruins defenseman Zdeno Chára.

Late in the 2010–11 season, Blues captain Eric Brewer had been traded away to the Tampa Bay Lightning, leaving the leadership position vacant for the remainder of the campaign. During the off-season, on September 9, 2011, Backes was chosen to succeed Brewer, becoming the 20th captain in team history. He scored 24 goals to go with 30 assists in 82 games played during the 2011–12 NHL season.

With 21 goals and 24 assists during the 2015-16 season, Backes would help lead the Blues to their first Western Conference Finals appearance since 2001. During the 2016 Stanley Cup Playoffs, he scored seven goals with seven assists.

==== Boston Bruins (2016–2020) ====
After ten seasons with the Blues organization and leading the club as captain for the last five seasons, Backes left as a free agent after the 2015–16 season. On July 1, 2016, Backes agreed to a five-year, $30 million deal with the Boston Bruins.

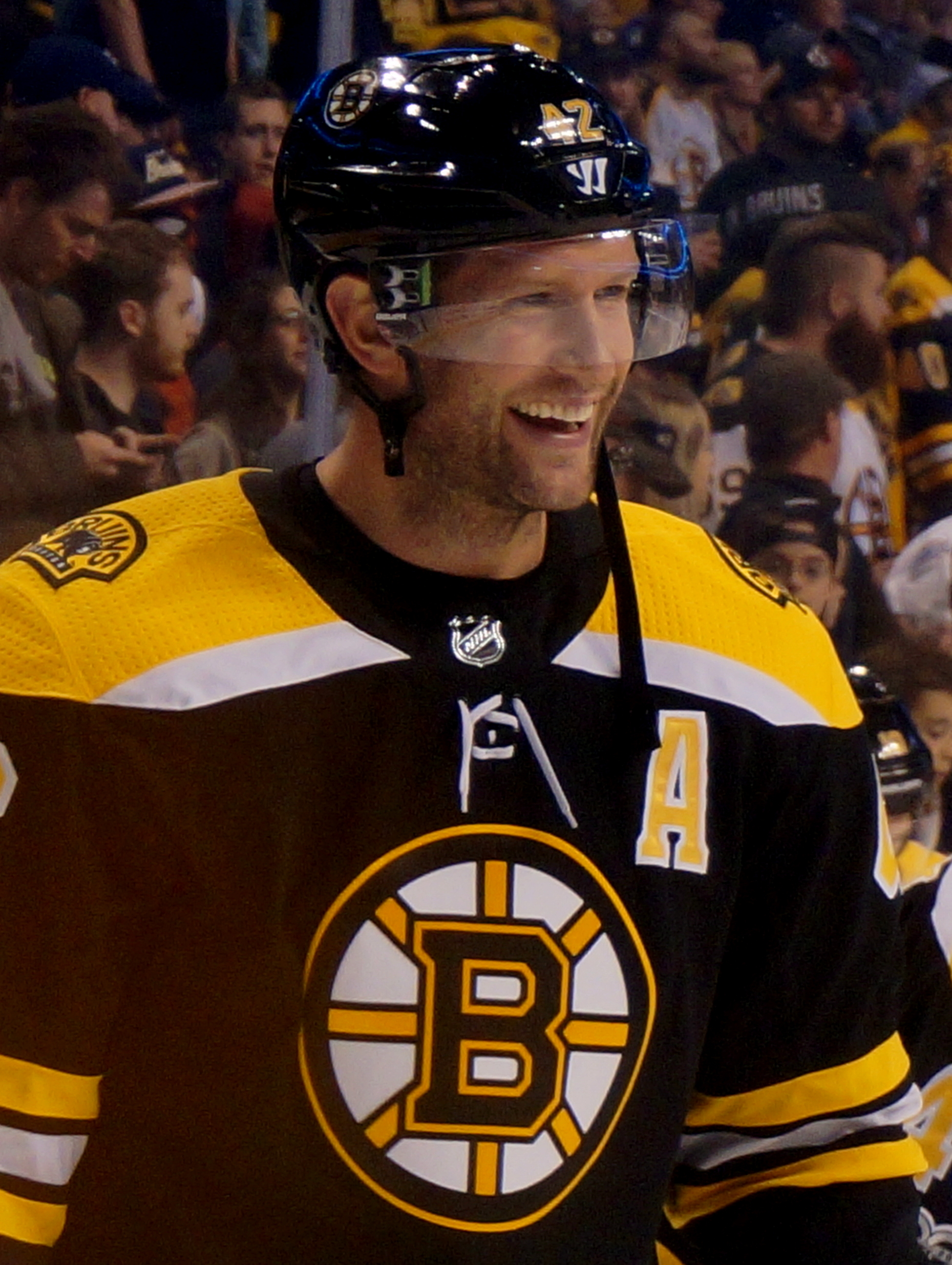
Backes with the Bruins in October 2017

On November 22, 2016, the Bruins as a team reached the milestone of 20,000 goals all-time in NHL play, dating back to their 1924–25 debut season when left winger Smokey Harris scored the Bruins' first-ever goal on December 1, 1924; Backes' power play goal for the Bruins got them to the 20,000th-team goal total plateau in a 4–2 home rink loss to his previous team, the St. Louis Blues. The 20,000th goal plateau has only been attained by one other NHL team—the Bruins' top rival—the Montreal Canadiens.

At the beginning of the 2017–18 season, Backes had been diagnosed with a diverticulitis infection, and missed the first five games of the regular season, but was able to play again by October 19, the night of a home game against the Vancouver Canucks. However, a re-evaluation shortly thereafter, with Backes' most recent game on October 30, on the road against the Columbus Blue Jackets, revealed that an operation to remove part of his colon would be necessary; it was carried out on November 2, with a projected eight-week recovery time. Backes was suspended for three games on March 7, 2018, due to interference against Detroit Red Wings player Frans Nielsen, during a game on March 6, 2018. Following an accidental hockey-skate cut above one knee suffered in a March 17, 2018 Bruins road game by the Tampa Bay Lightning's Yanni Gourde, Backes required 17 stitches to close the wound, and needed to stay off the ice for it to heal - Backes returned against the Lightning in a home game for the Bruins on March 29. Ahead of his return on March 29, Backes was selected as the Bruins' nominee for the Bill Masterton Trophy, which is awarded to the player who "best exemplifies the qualities of perseverance, sportsmanship and dedication to hockey."

On December 27, 2018, Backes delivered an illegal hit to the head of New Jersey Devils' forward Blake Coleman. He was assessed a minor penalty on the play. The following day, Backes was suspended for three games. As a repeat offender, Backes forfeited $219,512.19. In the 2019 Stanley Cup Finals, Backes would faceoff against the team that he once captained, the St. Louis Blues. The Bruins would ultimately lose to the Blues in seven games, one win short from winning the Stanley Cup. Backes appeared in 15 games during Boston's run to the Finals, tallying two goals and three assists.

==== Anaheim Ducks (2020–2021) ====
On February 21, 2020, the Bruins traded Backes, prospect Axel Andersson and a 2020 first-round pick to the Anaheim Ducks in exchange for Ondřej Kaše.

On May 5, 2021, Backes played his final NHL game against his former team, the St. Louis Blues, in which he received a standing ovation.

==== Retirement ====
On September 9, 2021, Backes signed a one-day contract with the St. Louis Blues in order to officially retire as a member of the team.

== International play ==
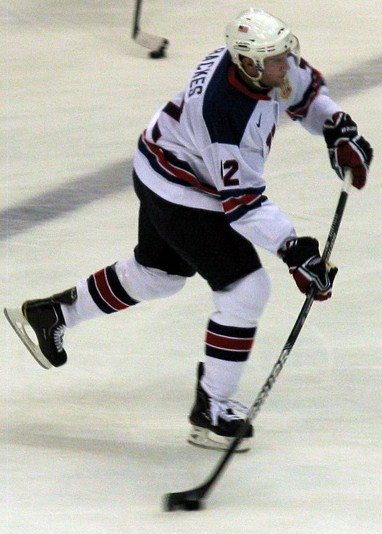
Backes during the 2010 Winter Olympics

Following his rookie NHL season, Backes was named to the United States' national team for the 2007 IIHF World Championship. He played in seven games, contributing a goal, two assists and six penalty minutes, as the U.S. finished in fifth place. He again suited up for Team USA at the 2008 IIHF World Championship, contributing an assist and 35 penalty minutes over six games as the U.S. finished sixth. Competing for a third consecutive year at the World Championships in 2009, Backes registering a goal and four assists in nine games. The U.S. placed fourth, losing to Sweden 4–2 in the bronze medal game.

On January 1, 2010, Backes was named to the United States' roster for the 2010 Winter Olympics in Vancouver. He recorded a goal and two assists over six games, helping the United States to the gold medal game. They were defeated 3–2 by Canada in overtime, earning silver.

On January 1, 2014, Backes was named to the United States's roster for the 2014 Winter Olympics along with St. Louis teammates Kevin Shattenkirk and T. J. Oshie. Although the U.S. team did not win a medal, the forward played in six games, scored three goals, had one assist, and four points — while accumulating six penalty minutes — in Sochi.

== Personal life ==
Backes and his wife Kelly have two children. Backes is a Christian.

Backes got his private pilot's license in 2012 and has flown many planes since. He graduated with an applied organizational studies degree with a nonprofit leadership emphasis from Minnesota State University, Mankato in 2014, and had formerly studied to become an electrical engineer.

Backes is a passionate advocate for animal welfare, and has had pets since he was a child and when he was struggling to get a break in the NHL. Together with his wife, Kelly, he is highly active in animal rescue efforts and pet adoption drives. In November 2013, they founded Athletes for Animals, an organization to raise funds and awareness for rescuing and protecting the welfare of homeless pets.

On April 4, 2017, six cattle that escaped slaughter in north St. Louis were put under the care of The Gentle Barn, an animal sanctuary with facilities in California and Tennessee with David and Kelly helping provide support to the community based GoFundMe campaigns created for their freedom.

== Career statistics ==
=== Regular season and playoffs ===
			Regular season					Playoffs
Season	Team	League	GP	G	A	Pts	PIM	GP	G	A	Pts	PIM
1999–2000	Spring Lake Park High School	HS-MN	24	17	20	37	—	—	—	—	—	—
2000–01	Spring Lake Park High School	HS-MN	24	29	46	75	—	—	—	—	—	—
2001–02	Spring Lake Park High School	HS-MN	25	31	36	67	—	2	1	1	2	—
2001–02	Lincoln Stars	USHL	30	11	10	21	54	3	0	0	0	2
2002–03	Lincoln Stars	USHL	57	28	41	69	126	7	4	1	5	17
2003–04	Minnesota State Mavericks	WCHA	39	16	21	37	66	—	—	—	—	—
2004–05	Minnesota State Mavericks	WCHA	38	17	23	40	55	—	—	—	—	—
2005–06	Minnesota State Mavericks	WCHA	38	13	29	42	91	—	—	—	—	—
2005–06	Peoria Rivermen	AHL	12	5	5	10	10	3	1	1	2	8
2006–07	Peoria Rivermen	AHL	31	10	3	13	47	—	—	—	—	—
2006–07	St. Louis Blues	NHL	49	10	13	23	37	—	—	—	—	—
2007–08	St. Louis Blues	NHL	72	13	18	31	99	—	—	—	—	—
2008–09	St. Louis Blues	NHL	82	31	23	54	165	4	1	2	3	10
2009–10	St. Louis Blues	NHL	79	17	31	48	106	—	—	—	—	—
2010–11	St. Louis Blues	NHL	82	31	31	62	93	—	—	—	—	—
2011–12	St. Louis Blues	NHL	82	24	30	54	101	9	2	2	4	18
2012–13	St. Louis Blues	NHL	48	6	22	28	62	6	1	2	3	0
2013–14	St. Louis Blues	NHL	74	27	30	57	119	4	0	1	1	2
2014–15	St. Louis Blues	NHL	80	26	32	58	104	6	1	1	2	2
2015–16	St. Louis Blues	NHL	79	21	24	45	83	20	7	7	14	8
2016–17	Boston Bruins	NHL	74	17	21	38	69	6	1	3	4	2
2017–18	Boston Bruins	NHL	57	14	19	33	53	12	2	1	3	19
2018–19	Boston Bruins	NHL	70	7	13	20	31	15	2	3	5	2
2019–20	Boston Bruins	NHL	16	1	2	3	16	—	—	—	—	—
2019–20	Anaheim Ducks	NHL	6	0	3	3	6	—	—	—	—	—
2020–21	Anaheim Ducks	NHL	15	3	1	4	4	—	—	—	—	—
NHL totals			965	248	313	561	1,148	82	17	22	39	63

=== International ===
Year	Team	Event	Result	GP	G	A	Pts	PIM
2007	United States	WC	5th	7	1	2	3	6
2008	United States	WC	6th	6	0	1	1	35
2009	United States	WC	4th	9	1	4	5	33
2010	United States	OG	2nd place, silver medalist(s)	6	1	2	3	2
2014	United States	OG	4th	6	3	1	4	6
2016	United States	WCH	7th	2	0	0	0	0
Senior totals				36	6	10	16	82

== Awards and honors ==
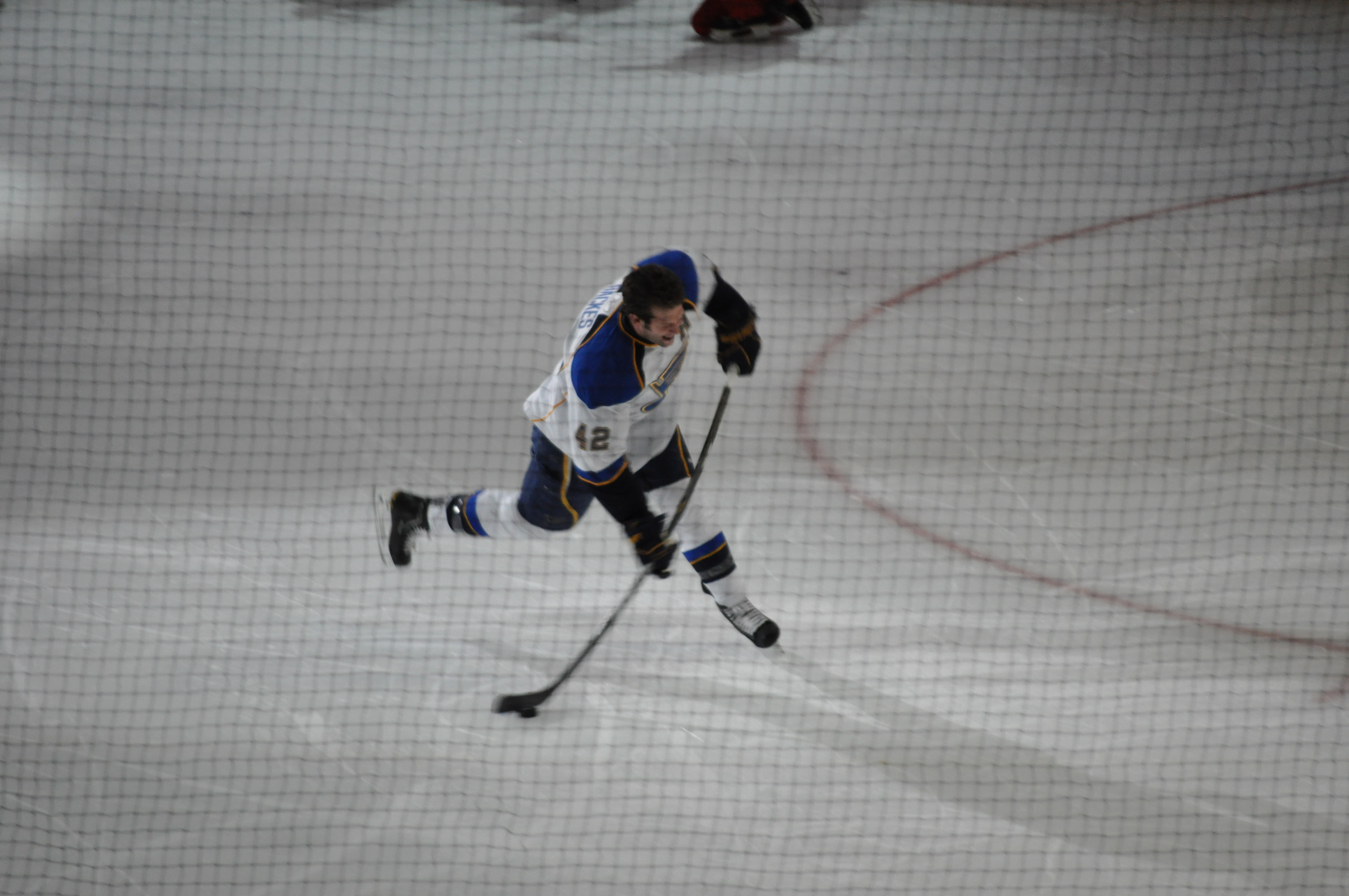
Backes competes in the hardest shot skills competition during the 2011 NHL All-Star Game

Award	Year
USHS
Finalist, Minnesota Mr. Hockey	2002
USHL
All-USHL First Team	2003
College
All-WCHA Rookie Team	2004
All-WCHA Third Team	2005
WCHA All-Academic Team	2005, 2006
All-WCHA Second Team	2006
AHCA West Second-Team All-American	2006
ESPN Academic All-America First Team	2006
NHL
NHL All-Star Game	2011

Sporting positions
Preceded by Eric Brewer	St. Louis Blues captain 2011–2016	Succeeded by Alex Pietrangelo
