= Sharon L. Coleman =

American politician and businesswoman

Sharon L. Coleman (born 1945) was an American politician and businesswoman.

Coleman lived in Spring Lake Park, Minnesota with her husband and family and was self-employed. She went to Augsburg University. Coleman served in the Minnesota House of Representatives in 1983 and 1984 and was a Democrat.
