= Rogers High School (Rogers, Minnesota) =

Location
- 21000 141st Ave; Rogers, Minnesota 55374; United States; 45.21183°N 93.5444°W

Information
- Type: Public
- Motto: "It’s a great day to be a Royal"
- Established: 2003
- Principal: Jason Paurus
- Teaching staff: 67.25 (FTE)
- Enrollment: 1,888 (2024-2025)
- Student to teacher ratio: 28.07
- Athletics conference: Northwest Suburban Conference
- Mascot: Royals ("Rog" the Wildcat)
- Rival: Elk River Elks
- Colors: Royal Blue, White, and Black
- Website: rhs.isd728.org

Rogers High School is a public high school located in Rogers, Minnesota, United States, and is part of the Elk River School District 728.

== Athletics ==
Through the 2018–19 school year, Rogers High School competed in the Mississippi 8 Conference, consisting of other central Minnesota schools (Big Lake, Buffalo, Cambridge-Isanti, Chisago Lakes, Monticello, North Branch, Princeton, St. Francis, and St. Michael-Albertville).

Since the 2019–2020 school year, Rogers has competed in the Northwest Suburban Conference, which includes Andover, Anoka, Blaine, Centennial, Champlin Park, Coon Rapids, Elk River, Maple Grove, Osseo, Park Center, Robbinsdale Armstrong, Spring Lake Park, and Totino-Grace.

In 2021 the Rogers High School Football team made it to the state semifinals in the Minnesota State High School League class 5A playoffs.

== 2010–2011 ==
Notable events in 2010–2011 included girls soccer winning the State Tournament and Mississippi 8 Conference title with an undefeated season. Football advanced to the State Tournament for the second consecutive year.

== 2009–2010 ==
Notable events in 2009–2010 included the Rogers Football Team advancing to the State Tournament for the first time in school history. Girls soccer won the Class A State Tournament.

== Notable alumni ==
- Nick Jensen (2008), hockey player for the Anaheim Ducks
- Hannah Sjerven (2016), basketball player who played for the Minnesota Lynx
