= Dave Mordal =

American comedian

Dave Mordal (pronounced like "more doll") is a comedian from Elk River, Minnesota.

== Career ==
He was a contestant on the first and third seasons of NBC's Last Comic Standing where, as per the Arizona Daily Star, he came to be "best known for his sarcastic humor as a battling comedian". In a July 2003 People report, Mordal shared his views about the show: "“Ten comics living in a house together. [...] It's just going to be a matter of time before either everybody gets used to it or somebody snaps and kills somebody."

He was fourth eliminated in the first season after losing in a head-to-head competition to Dat Phan, the eventual winner of Last Comic Standing season 1. He was first runner-up in the third season. On the series, Mordal was known for his great friendship with Rich Vos, with whom he was seen taking baths and ironing. Also notable was the "infamous" rat hunt where Mordal caught a rat.

He also has made guest appearances on The Tonight Show with Jay Leno and appeared in the 1999 film Los Enchiladas as a bread delivery man.

Mordal was the host of Wreckreation Nation, which first aired January 2009 on the Discovery Channel. A February 2009 New York Times report called Mordal "the intrepid star of "Wreckreation Nation,”..." additionally quoting a Nielsen report that said that the show had garnered an average viewership of 1.3 million.

While largely retired from his stand-up comedy career, he currently appears on-air weekdays as a personality on the morning-drive "The KQ Morning Show," on Minneapolis/St. Paul's KQRS-FM 92.5.
