= Spring Lake Park School District 16 =

Minnesota school district

Spring Lake Park Schools

Location
- 1415 81st Avenue NE; Spring Lake Park, Minnesota United States
- Coordinates: 45.1150°N 93.2344°W

District information
- Type: Public
- Grades: PreK–12
- Schools: 12
- NCES District ID: 2733330

Students and staff
- Students: 5,500 (2013-14)
- Teachers: 293.30 (on FTE basis)
- Student–teacher ratio: 16.90:1

Other information
- Website: www.springlakeparkschools.org

Spring Lake Park School District 16 is a Minnesota school district serving 5,500 students from the cities of Blaine, Spring Lake Park, and Fridley. Schools and programs include Spring Lake Park High School, Westwood Middle School, Westwood Intermediate School, Northpoint Elementary, Park Terrace Elementary, Centerview Elementary, Woodcrest Elementary Spanish Immersion, The Lighthouse School, Spring Lake Park Online Learning, Early Childhood Center, and District Services Center.

== Schools ==
- Centerview Elementary's current campus, with a capacity of 800, opened in 2018. It includes nanowalls which are transparent.
