= Human Dog Sled Competition =

Sledding competition in Massachusetts, USA

Participants at the Human Dog Sled Competition

The Human Dog Sled Competition was an annual event that took place during the Winterfest celebration of Lowell, Massachusetts, USA between 2000 and 2015.

The Lowell Winterfest website is currently selling bandanas that read "bring back the human dog sled races."

The PETA website cites the event and encourages people to support human-based competitions like it as an alternative to dogsled racing.

The event involved teams competing against each other in a double elimination tournament to determine the National Human Dog Sled Champion. The teams consisted of six persons including four sled pullers, a sled rider, and a sled pusher. The sled race, approximately 50 meters long, took place along a snow-covered street in downtown Lowell. Team members often dressed in wacky costumes, with a prize for the most creative of attire.

The Colgate University crew team entered two teams in the 2010 competition. The 2011 event was cancelled due to heavy snow but the competition returned in 2012. The 2014 event featured 18 teams.
