= Spring Lake Park, Minnesota =

City in Minnesota, United States

- City
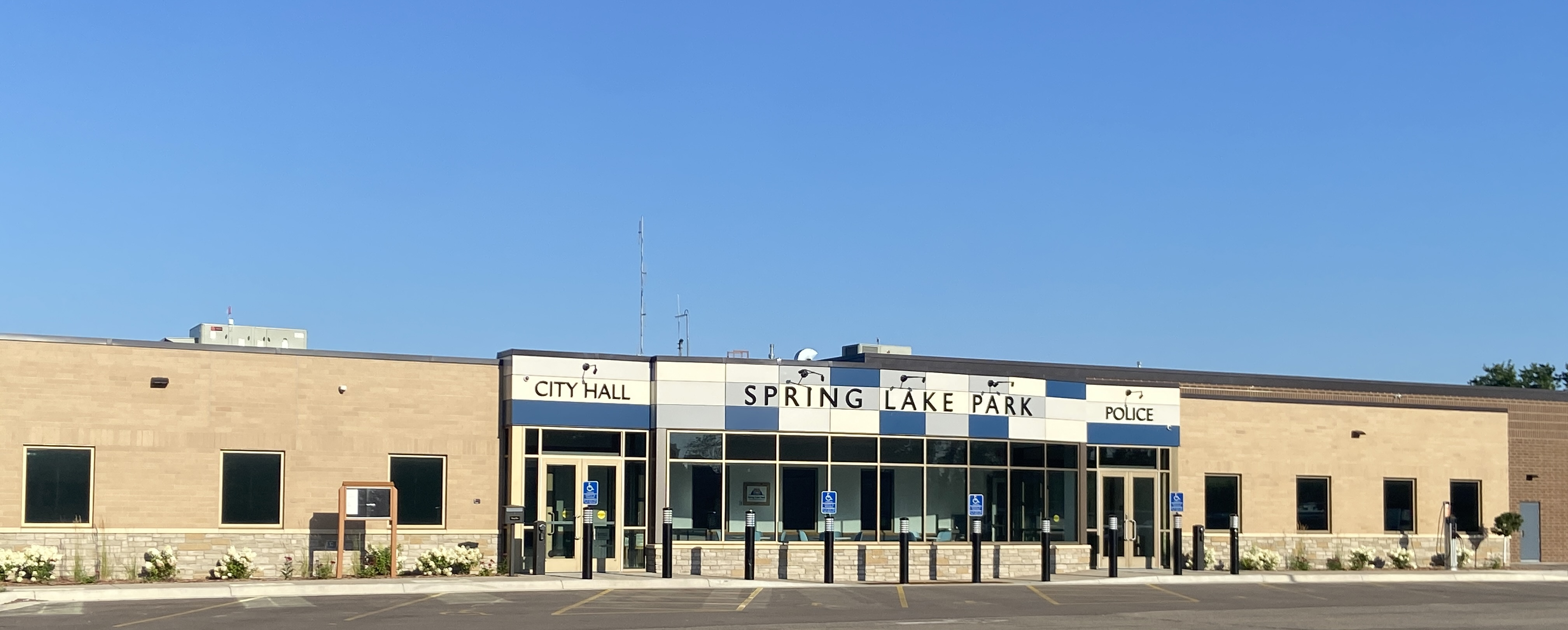
- City Hall and Police Station, 2025

- Logo
- Coordinates: 45°06′58″N 93°14′52″W
- Country: United States
- State: Minnesota
- Counties: Anoka, Ramsey

Government
  - Mayor: Robert 'Bob' Nelson

Area
  - Total: 2.09 sq mi (5.41 km^{2})
  - Land: 2.00 sq mi (5.17 km^{2})
  - Water: 0.093 sq mi (0.24 km^{2})
- Elevation: 912 ft (278 m)

Population (2020)
  - Total: 7,188
  - Density: 3,603.6/sq mi (1,391.35/km^{2})
- Time zone: UTC-6 (Central (CST))
  - Summer (DST): UTC-5 (CDT)
- ZIP code: 55432
- Area code: 763
- FIPS code: 27-61996
- GNIS feature ID: 2395934
- Website: City of Spring Lake Park

Spring Lake Park is a city in Anoka and Ramsey counties in the state of Minnesota. The population was 7,188 at the 2020 census. The city is located mainly within Anoka County. Minnesota State Highways 47 and 65 and County Highway 10 are three of the main routes in the city.

== Geography ==
According to the United States Census Bureau, the city has a total area of 2.07 square miles (5.36 km^{2}), of which 1.98 square miles (5.13 km^{2}) is land and 0.09 square miles (0.23 km^{2}) is water.

Highway 65–Central Avenue NE runs north–south through the middle of Spring Lake Park. County Highway 10 passes through the northeast portion of the city.

Highway 47–University Avenue NE runs north–south along Spring Lake Park's western boundary line with adjacent city of Fridley.

Osborne Road runs east–west along Spring Lake Park's southern boundary line with adjacent city of Fridley.

Sanburnol Drive–85th Avenue NE runs east–west along Spring Lake Park's northern boundary line with adjacent city of Blaine.

Nearby places include Blaine, Mounds View, Fridley, and Coon Rapids.

== Demographics ==
Historical population
Census	Pop.	Note	%±
1960	3,260		—
1970	6,417		96.8%
1980	6,477		0.9%
1990	6,532		0.8%
2000	6,778		3.8%
2010	6,412		−5.4%
2020	7,188		12.1%
U.S. Decennial Census; 2012 Estimate

=== 2020 census ===
As of the 2020 census, Spring Lake Park had a population of 7,188. The median age was 41.7 years. 20.7% of residents were under the age of 18 and 20.7% of residents were 65 years of age or older. For every 100 females there were 90.4 males, and for every 100 females age 18 and over there were 88.0 males age 18 and over.

100.0% of residents lived in urban areas, while 0.0% lived in rural areas.

There were 2,956 households in Spring Lake Park, of which 26.7% had children under the age of 18 living in them. Of all households, 40.5% were married-couple households, 18.5% were households with a male householder and no spouse or partner present, and 32.9% were households with a female householder and no spouse or partner present. About 31.5% of all households were made up of individuals and 16.6% had someone living alone who was 65 years of age or older.

There were 3,026 housing units, of which 2.3% were vacant. The homeowner vacancy rate was 0.7% and the rental vacancy rate was 1.8%.

Racial composition as of the 2020 census
Race	Number	Percent
White	5,015	69.8%
Black or African American	912	12.7%
American Indian and Alaska Native	76	1.1%
Asian	428	6.0%
Native Hawaiian and Other Pacific Islander	2	0.0%
Some other race	343	4.8%
Two or more races	412	5.7%
Hispanic or Latino (of any race)	539	7.5%

=== 2010 census ===
As of the census of 2010, there were 6,412 people, 2,672 households, and 1,694 families living in the city. The population density was 3,238.4 inhabitants per square mile (1,250.4/km^{2}). There were 2,795 housing units at an average density of 1,411.6 per square mile (545.0/km^{2}). The racial makeup of the city was 83.7% White, 3.8% African American, 0.9% Native American, 5.1% Asian, 2.9% from other races, and 3.6% from two or more races. Hispanic or Latino of any race were 5.9% of the population.

There were 2,672 households, of which 26.6% had children under the age of 18 living with them, 45.0% were married couples living together, 12.8% had a female householder with no husband present, 5.6% had a male householder with no wife present, and 36.6% were non-families. 30.1% of all households were made up of individuals, and 13% had someone living alone who was 65 years of age or older. The average household size was 2.39 and the average family size was 2.95.

The median age in the city was 41.2 years. 19.9% of residents were under the age of 18; 8.7% were between the ages of 18 and 24; 26.6% were from 25 to 44; 28.5% were from 45 to 64; and 16.5% were 65 years of age or older. The gender makeup of the city was 48.8% male and 51.2% female.

=== 2000 census ===
As of the census of 2000, there were 6,778 people, 2,724 households, and 1,839 families living in the city. The population density was 3,415.0 inhabitants per square mile (1,318.5/km^{2}). There were 2,756 housing units at an average density of 1,388.2 per square mile (536.0/km^{2}). The racial makeup of the city was 89.87% White, 2.27% African American, 0.81% Native American, 3.13% Asian, 0.01% Pacific Islander, 1.96% from other races, and 1.95% from two or more races. Hispanic or Latino of any race were 3.38% of the population.

There were 2,725 households, out of which 28.5% had children under the age of 18 living with them, 51.0% were married couples living together, 11.7% had a female householder with no husband present, and 32.8% were non-families. 25.8% of all households were made up of individuals, and 11.2% had someone living alone who was 65 years of age or older. The average household size was 2.48 and the average family size was 2.97.

In the city, the population was spread out, with 22.6% under the age of 18, 9.4% from 18 to 24, 29.5% from 25 to 44, 26.3% from 45 to 64, and 12.2% who were 65 years of age or older. The median age was 38 years. For every 100 females, there were 91.8 males. For every 100 females age 18 and over, there were 91.2 males.

The median income for a household in the city was $46,644, and the median income for a family was $56,922. Males had a median income of $39,026 versus $28,677 for females. The per capita income for the city was $21,932. About 2.7% of families and 5.1% of the population were below the poverty line, including 3.9% of those under age 18 and 3.3% of those age 65 or over.

== Education ==
There are two education buildings in Spring Lake Park: Park Terrace Elementary and Spring Lake Park High School, as well as the District Services and Enrollment Center for Minnesota Independent School District 16. Two other elementary schools, one intermediate school, and one middle school, also in the district, are located in the bordering suburbs of Blaine and Fridley. The district usually operates from the day after Labor Day to June 6.

== Notable people ==
- David Backes, NHL Player, attended Spring Lake Park High School
- Sharon L. Coleman, politician
- Donald J. Frank, former State Senator
- Alice Johnson, State Senator
- Erin Koegel, State Representative.
- Brian Leonhardt, NFL player, attended Spring Lake Park High School
- Paul McCarron, politician
- Troy Merritt, golfer
- Pam Wolf, former State Senator
