= Spring Lake Park High School =

Location
- 1100 81st Avenue; Spring Lake Park, Minnesota; 55432; United States; 45.1135°N 93.2457°W

Information
- Type: Public
- Motto: "Panther Pride!"
- Established: 1955
- School district: Spring Lake Park Schools
- NCES School ID: 273333001464
- Principal: Megan Jahnke
- Teaching staff: 97.02 (FTE)
- Grades: 9 to 12
- Enrollment: 1,965 (2023-2024)
- Student to teacher ratio: 20.25
- Colors: Red, blue and white
- Athletics conference: Northwest Suburban Conference
- Mascot: Panther
- Rivals: Centennial Cougars; Blaine Bengals; Irondale Knights
- Website: SLPHS

Spring Lake Park High School (SLPHS) is a public high school in Spring Lake Park, Minnesota, United States. It is the only high school serving Spring Lake Park School District 16. In the 2020–2021 school year, it enrolled about 1,850 students, drawn primarily from the Minneapolis suburb of Spring Lake Park as well as parts of the suburbs of Blaine and Fridley. The Spring Lake Park Panthers are part of the North Suburban Conference.

== History ==
The first Spring Lake Park Junior/Senior High School opened for the 1955–56 school year.

"In 1976, Spring Lake Park became the first high school in the nation to provide Emergency Medical Services training. As a result of a Title III grant, the Opportunities in Emergency Health Care Program started training high school students to become Emergency Medical Technicians (EMT’s)."

The campus was renovated throughout the 2008–09 school year. Kenneth Hall Elementary School, which was located on the high school campus, was torn down and the land converted into a parking lot.

== Athletics ==
The school sponsors the following varsity athletic teams and competes in the North Suburban Conference of the Minnesota State High School League:

- Fall
  - Soccer (boys)
  - Football
  - Cross country
  - Soccer (girls)
  - Swimming and diving (girls)
  - Tennis (girls)
  - Volleyball (girls)
  - Dance team (noncompetitive)
- Winter
  - Dance team
  - Gymnastics
  - Hockey (boys)
  - Hockey (girls)
  - Nordic skiing
  - Swimming and diving (boys)
  - Basketball (boys)
  - Basketball (girls)
- Spring
  - Tennis (boys)
  - Softball
  - Golf (girls)
  - Lacrosse (girls)
  - Lacrosse (boys)
  - Baseball
  - Golf (boys)
  - Track and field
  - Volleyball (boys)

=== State championships ===
- Football
  - 2025 (5A)
  - 1991 (2A)
- Dance jazz
  - 2005 Jazz/Funk (2A)
  - 2006 Jazz/Funk (2A)
  - 2007 Jazz/Funk (2A)
- Bowling
  - 2022 (2A)
- Cross Country
  - 2025

== Notable alumni ==
- David Backes — National Hockey League player for the Anaheim Ducks, St. Louis Blues and Boston Bruins
- E. J. Ejiya — professional football player
- Brian Leonhardt — football player for Minnesota Vikings
- Troy Merritt — professional golfer who has played on the PGA Tour and the Web.com Tour
