= Rogers, Minnesota =

City in Minnesota, United States

- City
- Seal Logo

- Location of Rogers, Minnesota
- Coordinates: 45°11′19.87″N 93°33′10.85″W
- Country: United States
- State: Minnesota
- County: Hennepin
- Founded: 1854
- Incorporated: 1914

Government
  - Mayor: Richard Ihli
  - City manager: Steve Stahmer
  - Councilmembers: Mark Eiden; Amy Enga; Kevin Jullie; Shannon Klick

Area
  - City: 26.255 sq mi (68.000 km^{2})
  - Land: 25.409 sq mi (65.808 km^{2})
  - Water: 0.846 sq mi (2.191 km^{2})
- Elevation: 965 ft (294 m)

Population (2020)
  - City: 13,295
  - Estimate (2023): 13,617
  - Density: 535.9/sq mi (206.91/km^{2})
  - Metro: 3,712,020
- Time zone: UTC–6 (Central (CST))
  - Summer (DST): UTC–5 (CDT)
- ZIP Code: 55374
- Area code: 763
- FIPS code: 27-55186
- GNIS feature ID: 0650221
- Sales tax: 8.775%
- Website: rogersmn.gov

Rogers is a city located in Hennepin County, Minnesota, United States. The population was 13,295 at the 2020 census. In 2012, the city annexed the surrounding Hassan Township. The City of Rogers is considered a northwest suburb of the Minneapolis–Saint Paul metropolitan area. The city's economy is mostly based on industrial activity and agriculture.

The city is located on either side of Interstate 94, with Minnesota State Highway 101 running north and its western boundary touches the Crow River.

== Geography ==
Rogers is located at 45°11′19.87″N 93°33′10.85″W (45.1888534, -93.5530144).

According to the United States Census Bureau, the city has a total area of 26.255 square miles (68.00 km^{2}), of which, 25.409 square miles (65.81 km^{2}) is land and 0.846 square miles (2.19 km^{2}) is water.

== History ==
In the 1880s, Thomas Rogers sold an acre of his land, then part of Hassan Township, to Great Northern Railroad for a dollar. The new depot provided a convenient stop for the rich timber resources of the area and served as the beginning ground of a new community. When St. Martin Catholic Church and school were added, Rogers grew in local importance, consequently causing new businesses to be built and the town to be regarded as more of a local hub than other nearby communities such as Fletcher. In 1914, the city was incorporated.

Throughout the years the town grew slowly until, in 1972, Interstate 94 was constructed. Running right through Rogers, the new freeway provided easy access to Minneapolis and Saint Paul, causing additional businesses such as Graco, CDI, Dept. 56 and Reinhart Foodservice to add operations. The additional jobs created new population growth. As growth occurred, additional land was required, causing Rogers to annex more and more land from the surrounding Hassan Township. Hassan Township was completely integrated into Rogers on January 1, 2012.

Early founding families names still serve as key contributors to the community. Otto Scharber was a prominent local businessman, owning a grocery store, hardware store, and a John Deere implement dealership, which is still in family operation today.

== Tornado ==
On September 16, 2006, an F2 tornado damaged homes in Rogers, killing one person. The tornado began three miles west of Rogers at 9:52pm The tornado made its first strike on Rogers at 9:54pm The tornado traveled along a path that was eight miles and lasted for approximately 12 minutes. The tornado also resulted in six injuries and the death of a 10-year-old girl, Jayme Wendt.

== Annexation of Hassan Township ==
On January 1, 2012, Hassan Township, Hennepin County's last township, was completely annexed into Rogers. Talks of annexation between Rogers and Hassan Township can be traced back to the 1970s, but the formal agreement was approved on December 30, 2003. In 2008, the Rogers City Council and the Hassan Town Board accelerated the annexation date to January 1, 2012. This was the third and final phase of annexation, boosting the Rogers population to over 11,000 residents.

== Education ==
Rogers has multiple schools within its borders, including four public schools:

- Rogers High School
- Rogers Middle School
- Hassan Elementary School
- Rogers Elementary School S.T.E.M. Magnet Program

Rogers High School with the mascot being the Rogers Royal. Numerous private schools have also cropped up over the city's history. Rogers High School was ranked #29 in Minnesota for 2023 by U.S. News & World Report based on performance on state-required tests and how well they prepare students for college.

== Demographics ==
Historical population
Census	Pop.	Note	%±
1920	190		—
1930	222		16.8%
1940	274		23.4%
1950	268		−2.2%
1960	378		41.0%
1970	544		43.9%
1980	652		19.9%
1990	698		7.1%
2000	3,588		414.0%
2010	8,597		139.6%
2020	13,295		54.6%
2023 (est.)	13,617		2.4%
U.S. Decennial Census; 2020 Census

As of the 2022 American Community Survey, there are 4,406 estimated households in Rogers with an average of 2.99 persons per household. The city has a median household income of $154,611. Approximately 2.6% of the city's population lives at or below the poverty line. Rogers has an estimated 72.8% employment rate, with 52.3% of the population holding a bachelor's degree or higher and 97.3% holding a high school diploma.

The top five reported ancestries (people were allowed to report up to two ancestries, thus the figures will generally add to more than 100%) were English (98.1%), Spanish (0.6%), Indo-European (0.4%), Asian and Pacific Islander (0.4%), and Other (0.4%).

The median age in the city was 37.2 years.

=== Racial and ethnic composition ===
Rogers, Minnesota – racial and ethnic composition Note: the US Census treats Hispanic/Latino as an ethnic category. This table excludes Latinos from the racial categories and assigns them to a separate category. Hispanics/Latinos may be of any race.
Race / ethnicity (NH = non-Hispanic)	Pop. 2000	Pop. 2010	Pop. 2020	% 2000	% 2010	% 2020
White alone (NH)	3,467	7,765	11,812	96.63%	90.32%	88.85%
Black or African American alone (NH)	13	204	361	0.36%	2.37%	2.72%
Native American or Alaska Native alone (NH)	1	11	18	0.03%	0.13%	0.14%
Asian alone (NH)	24	299	335	0.67%	3.48%	2.52%
Pacific Islander alone (NH)	0	0	4	0.00%	0.00%	0.03%
Other race alone (NH)	2	0	62	0.06%	0.00%	0.47%
Mixed race or multiracial (NH)	46	158	422	1.28%	1.84%	3.17%
Hispanic or Latino (any race)	35	160	281	0.98%	1.86%	2.11%
Total	3,588	8,597	13,295	100.00%	100.00%	100.00%

=== 2020 census ===
As of the 2020 census, there were 13,295 people, 4,534 households, and 3,569 families residing in the city. The population density was 523.2 inhabitants per square mile (202.0/km^{2}).

The median age was 38.1 years; 28.4% of residents were under age 18, 9.4% were under age 5, and 11.8% were age 65 or older. For every 100 females, there were 97.7 males, and for every 100 females age 18 and over there were 95.9 males age 18 and over.

85.5% of residents lived in urban areas, while 14.5% lived in rural areas.

Of the 4,534 households, 42.5% had children under the age of 18 living in them. 68.9% were married-couple households, 10.5% were households with a male householder and no spouse or partner present, and 16.2% were households with a female householder and no spouse or partner present. About 17.3% of all households were made up of individuals and 8.5% had someone living alone who was 65 years of age or older.

There were 4,638 housing units at an average density of 182.5 per square mile (70.5/km^{2}). Of all housing units, 2.2% were vacant; the homeowner vacancy rate was 0.8% and the rental vacancy rate was 7.2%.

=== 2010 census ===
As of the 2010 census, there were 8,597 people, 2,882 households, and 2,190 families living in the city. The population density was 1,067.5 inhabitants per square mile (412.2/km^{2}). There were 3,014 housing units at an average density of 374.4 per square mile (144.6/km^{2}). The racial makeup of the city was 91.35% White, 2.38% African American, 0.13% Native American, 3.51% Asian, 0.00% Pacific Islander, 0.56% from some other races and 2.07% from two or more races. Hispanic or Latino people of any race were 1.86% of the population.

There were 2,882 households, of which 52.1% had children under the age of 18 living with them, 65.3% were married couples living together, 7.3% had a female householder with no husband present, 3.4% had a male householder with no wife present, and 24.0% were non-families. 19.8% of all households were made up of individuals, and 9.3% had someone living alone who was 65 years of age or older. The average household size was 2.95 and the average family size was 3.45.

The median age in the city was 33.5 years. 34.9% of residents were under the age of 18; 5.3% were between the ages of 18 and 24; 33.5% were from 25 to 44; 18% were from 45 to 64; and 8.4% were 65 years of age or older. The gender makeup of the city was 49.2% male and 50.8% female.

=== 2000 census ===
As of the 2000 census, there were 3,588 people, 1,195 households, and 982 families living in the city. The population density was 715.1 inhabitants per square mile (276.1/km^{2}). There were 1,245 housing units at an average density of 248.1 per square mile (95.8/km^{2}). The racial makeup of the city was 97.10% White, 0.36% African American, 0.03% Native American, 0.67% Asian, % Pacific Islander, 0.36% from some other races and 1.48% from two or more races. Hispanic or Latino people of any race were 0.98% of the population.

There were 1,195 households, out of which 52.6% had children while under the age of 18, living with them, 77.2% were married couples living together, 3.2% had a female householder with no husband present, and 17.8% were non-families. 13.3% of all households were made up of individuals, and 4.7% had someone living alone who was 65 years of age or older. The average household size was 2.98 and the average family size was 3.31.

In the city, the population was spread out, with 33.8% under the age of 18, 4.6% from 18 to 24, 44.5% from 25 to 44, 11.9% from 45 to 64, and 5.3% who were 65 years of age or older. The median age was 31 years. For every 100 females, there were 100.4 males. For every 100 females age 18 and over, there were 101.8 males.

The median income for a household in the city was $73,143, and the median income for a family was $76,984. Males had a median income of $46,496 versus $35,869 for females. The per capita income for the city was $25,845. About 0.4% of families and 1.8% of the population were below the poverty line, including 0.1% of those under age 18 and 5.9% of those age 65 or over.
