= Minnesota Mr. Basketball =

Honor awarded to high school basketball players

Kevin McHale (#32 Celtics) was the recipient of the award in 1976.

Minnesota Mr. Basketball is an annual award recognizing excellence in Minnesota boys' high school basketball. The female equivalent is Minnesota Miss Basketball.

The award's legitimacy was challenged in February 2017 when John Carrier, then the boys' basketball coach at Henry Sibley High School in suburban Mendota Heights, harshly criticized Ken Lien, the chairman of the committee that annually chooses both Mr. and Miss Basketball, for his politicized anti-Muslim and anti-immigrant tweets from the @mrbasketballmn Twitter account. The Minnesota Basketball Coaches Association was among many who announced their support of Carrier's complaint.

The award was established in 1975 and is given to the person(s) chosen as the best high school boys' basketball senior in the U.S. state of Minnesota. The award is the fourth oldest such award in the nation; only Indiana Mr. Basketball, California Mr. Basketball, and Kentucky Mr. Basketball, which were first awarded in 1939, 1950, and 1956, respectively, predate it. A nine-member selection committee, now led by John Robinson, has selected five finalists in March of every year since the award began. In the middle of January, a "watch list" is published which recognizes 30-40 seniors who have had a strong start to the season. At the end of the regular season, the Top 10 candidates for the Mr Basketball award are announced. In order to select the most deserving student-athlete, the selection panel watches over 120 high school basketball games and creates detailed reviews on every one of them. Twice the panel chose two winners, in 1979 and 1998.

The first award winner was Gene Glynn, who attended Waseca High School in Waseca, Minnesota. He played for Mankato State University, now known as Minnesota State University.

Six recipients of the Minnesota Mr. Basketball award were enrolled at Hopkins High School and Minneapolis North High School, the most of any high school. Most recipients go to Division I universities, with a high of 17 attending the University of Minnesota. Glynn, the 1975 winner; Jim Jensen, the 1978 winner; Steve Schlotthauer, the 1986 winner; Tom Conroy, the 1989 winner; Joel McDonald, the 1991 winner; and Bret Yonke, the 1992 winner, all attended Division II schools. Conroy attended Northeastern Illinois University, which upgraded to Division I in 1991, his sophomore year. Yonke began his career at Division I Northwestern and later transferred to Division II St. Cloud State due to lack of playing time. The 1981 winner, Redd Overton, never attended a university and chose the junior college route instead.

Several former Minnesota Mr. Basketballs have been selected in the National Basketball Association Draft. Kevin McHale, the 1976 choice; Randy Breuer, the 1979 co-choice; Sam Jacobson, the 1994 choice; Joel Przybilla, the 1998 co-choice; and Kris Humphries, the 2003 choice, and Tyus Jones were picked in the first round. Kevin Lynch, the 1987 choice; Khalid El-Amin, the 1997 choice; and 2001 choice Rick Rickert were picked in the second round. Jim Petersen, the 1980 choice, was the only pick in the now obsolete third round. Chet Holmgren was selected by the Oklahoma City Thunder with the second overall pick in the 2022 NBA draft, making him the highest-selected draft pick ever taken out of Gonzaga and the highest-drafted pick from the state of Minnesota, topping Kevin McHale, who was taken third overall in 1980.

== Award winners ==
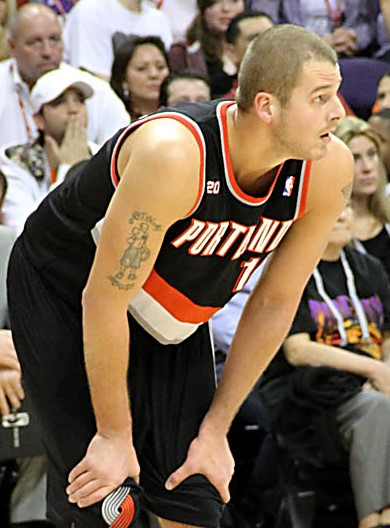
Joel Przybilla was the co-recipient of the award in 1998.

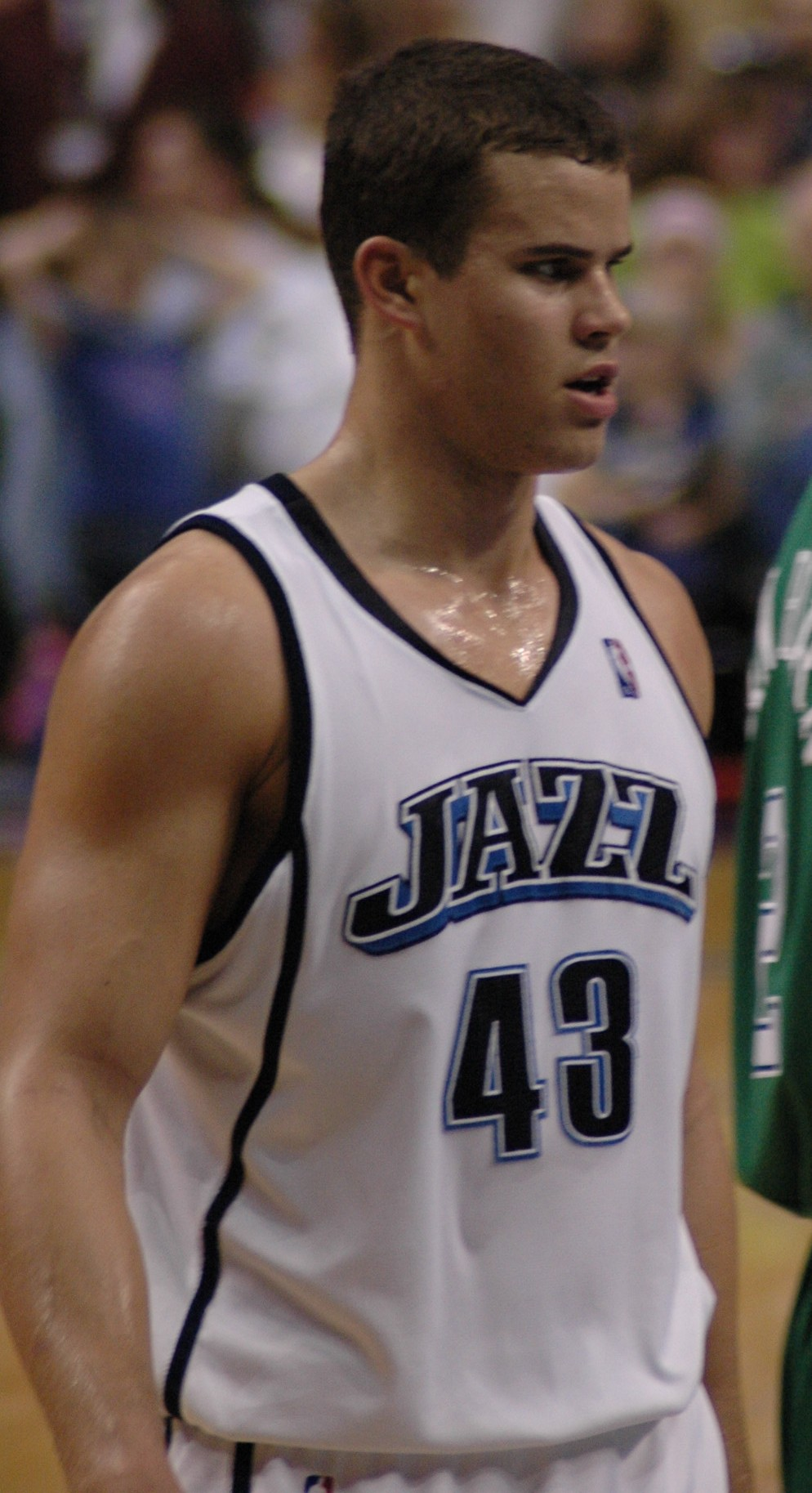
Kris Humphries was the recipient of the award in 2003.

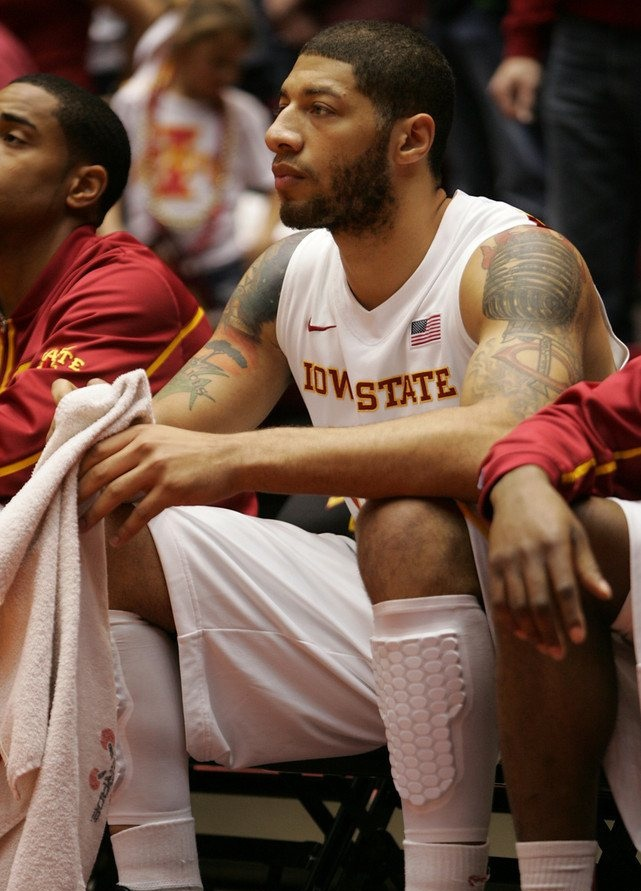
Royce White was the recipient of the award in 2009.

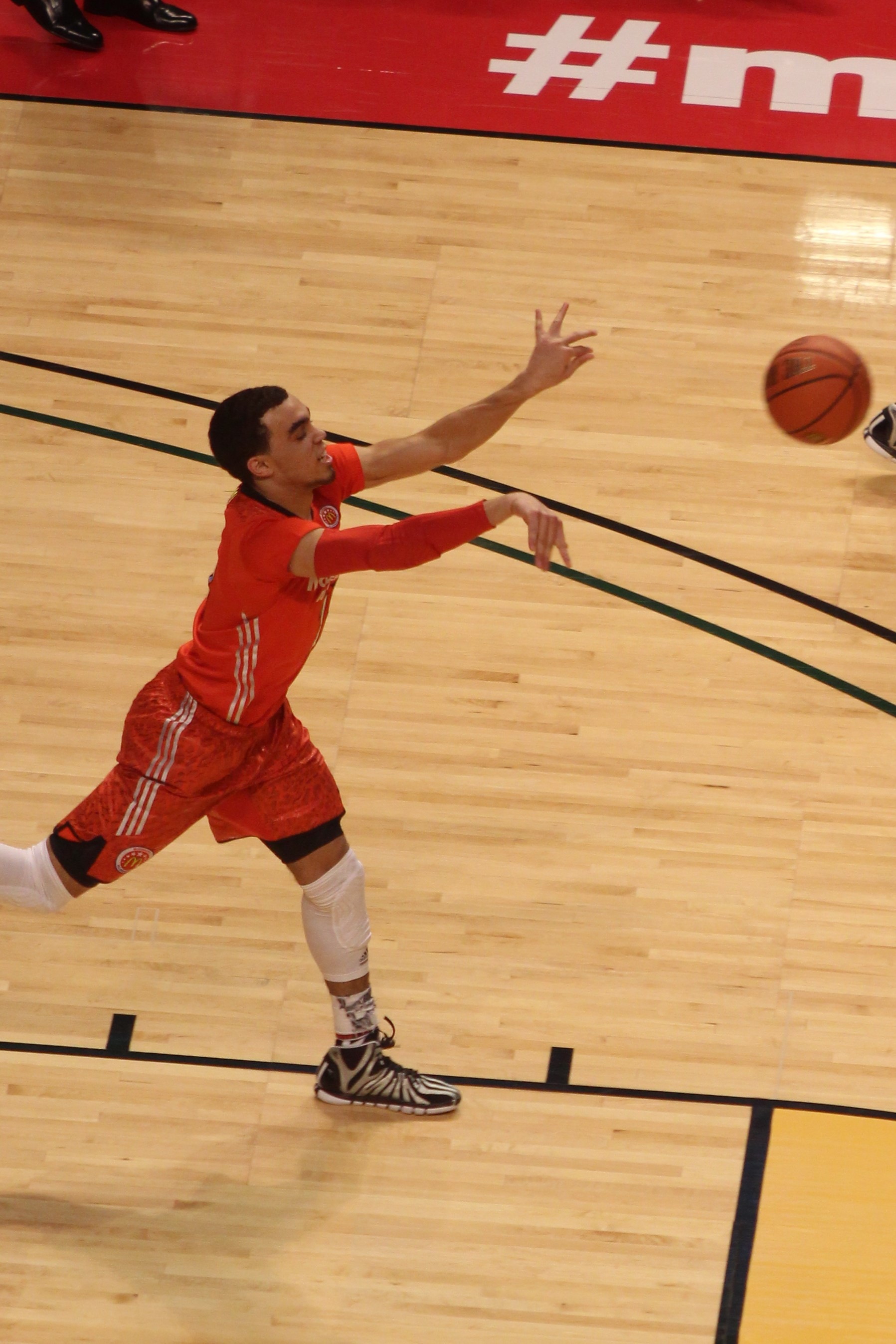
Tyus Jones was the 2014 recipient.

Year	Player	High school	University	NBA Draft
1975	Gene Glynn	Waseca High School, Waseca	Minnesota State	
1976	Kevin McHale	Hibbing High School, Hibbing	Minnesota	McHale was drafted by the Boston Celtics in the 1st round with the 3rd pick of the 1980 NBA draft.
1977	Brian Pederson	Prior Lake High School, Prior Lake	Minnesota	
1978	Jim Jensen	Bemidji High School, Bemidji	South Dakota State	
1979	Randy Breuer	Lincoln High School, Lake City	Minnesota	Breuer was drafted by the Milwaukee Bucks in the 1st round with the 18th pick of the 1983 NBA draft.
1979	Greg Downing (Note: In 1979, two Minnesota Mr. Basketballs were named.)	Duluth Central High School, Duluth	Nebraska	
1980	Jim Petersen	St. Louis Park High School, St. Louis Park	Minnesota	Petersen was drafted by the Houston Rockets in the 3rd round with the 4th pick (51st overall) of the 1984 NBA draft.
1981	Redd Overton	Minneapolis North High School, Minneapolis	North Hennepin Community College (Note: Overton never attended a university. He enrolled and played at a junior college.)	
1982	Rob Shelquist	Irondale High School, New Brighton	Montana State	
1983	Tom Copa	Coon Rapids High School, Coon Rapids	Marquette	
1984	Tim Hanson	Prior Lake High School, Prior Lake	Minnesota	
1985	Brett McNeal	Minneapolis North High School, Minneapolis	Western Kentucky	
1986	Steve Schlotthauer	Mounds View High School, Mounds View	Augustana (SD)	
1987	Kevin Lynch	Bloomington Jefferson High School, Bloomington	Minnesota	Lynch was drafted by the Charlotte Hornets in the 2nd round with the 1st pick (28th overall) of the 1991 NBA draft.
1988	Derek Reuben	Minneapolis North High School, Minneapolis	Eastern Kentucky	
1989	Tom Conroy	DeLaSalle High School, Minneapolis	Northeastern Illinois	
1990	Chad Kolander	Owatonna High School, Owatonna	Minnesota	
1991	Joel McDonald	Chisholm High School, Chisholm	St. Cloud State	
1992	Bret Yonke	Eagan High School, Eagan	Northwestern/St. Cloud State	
1993	Skipp Schaefbauer	Elk River High School, Elk River	East Carolina/Illinois State	
1994	Sam Jacobson	Park High School, Cottage Grove	Minnesota	Jacobson was drafted by the Los Angeles Lakers in the 1st round with the 26th pick of the 1998 NBA draft.
1995	Robert Mestas	Minneapolis Roosevelt High School, Minneapolis	Miami (OH)	
1996	Mitch Ohnstad	Faribault High School, Faribault	Cal Poly/Minnesota	
1997	Khalid El-Amin	Minneapolis North High School, Minneapolis	Connecticut	El-Amin was drafted by the Chicago Bulls in the 2nd round with the 5th pick (34th overall) of the 2000 NBA draft.
1998	Darius Lane	Totino-Grace High School, Fridley	Seton Hall	
1998	Joel Przybilla (Note: In 1998, two Minnesota Mr. Basketballs were named.)	Monticello High School, Monticello	Minnesota	Przybilla was drafted by the Houston Rockets in the 1st round with the 9th pick of the 2000 NBA draft.
1999	Nick Horvath	Mounds View High School, Mounds View	Duke	
2000	Adam Boone	Minnetonka High School, Minnetonka	North Carolina/Minnesota	
2001	Rick Rickert	Duluth East High School, Duluth	Minnesota	Rickert was drafted by the Minnesota Timberwolves in the 2nd round with the 26th pick (55th overall) of the 2003 NBA draft.
2002	Stephen King	Academy of Holy Angels, Richfield	Ohio	
2003	Kris Humphries	Hopkins High School, Minnetonka	Minnesota	Humphries was drafted by the Utah Jazz in the 1st round with the 14th pick of the 2004 NBA draft.
2004	Spencer Tollackson	Chaska High School, Chaska	Minnesota	
2005	Travis Busch	Mounds View High School, Mounds View	Cal Poly/Minnesota/Colorado State	
2006	Isaiah Dahlman	Braham High School, Braham	Michigan State	
2007	Blake Hoffarber	Hopkins High School, Minnetonka	Minnesota	
2008	Jordan Taylor	Benilde-St. Margaret's School, St. Louis Park	Wisconsin	
2009	Royce White	Hopkins High School, Minnetonka	Minnesota/Iowa State (Note: White signed with Minnesota, however, he transferred to Iowa State in July 2010 before playing a game with the Golden Gophers.)	White was drafted by the Houston Rockets in the 1st round with the 16th pick of the 2012 NBA draft.
2010	Kevin Noreen	Minnesota Transitions School, Minneapolis	West Virginia	
2011	Joe Coleman	Hopkins High School, Minnetonka	Minnesota	
2012	Siyani Chambers	Hopkins High School, Minnetonka	Harvard	
2013	Quinton Hooker	Park Center Senior High School, Brooklyn Park	North Dakota	
2014	Tyus Jones	Apple Valley High School, Apple Valley	Duke	Jones was drafted by the Cleveland Cavaliers with the 24th pick of the 2015 NBA draft and traded to the Minnesota Timberwolves on draft night.
2015	JT Gibson	Champlin Park High School, Brooklyn Park	Omaha	
2016	Amir Coffey	Hopkins High School, Minnetonka	Minnesota	Coffey went undrafted in the 2019 NBA Draft but later signed a two-way contract with the Los Angeles Clippers.
2017	McKinley Wright IV	Champlin Park High School, Brooklyn Park	Colorado	
2018	Tre Jones	Apple Valley High School, Apple Valley	Duke	Jones was drafted by the San Antonio Spurs with the 41st pick (2nd Round) of the 2020 NBA draft.
2019	Matthew Hurt	John Marshall High School, Rochester	Duke	
2020	Jalen Suggs	Minnehaha Academy, Minneapolis	Gonzaga	Suggs was drafted by the Orlando Magic with the 5th pick in the 1st Round of the 2021 NBA draft.
2021	Chet Holmgren	Minnehaha Academy, Minneapolis	Gonzaga	Holmgren was drafted by the Oklahoma City Thunder with the 2nd pick in the 1st Round of the 2022 NBA draft.
2022	Braeden Carrington	Park Center Senior High School, Brooklyn Park	Minnesota	
2023	Nasir Whitlock	DeLaSalle High School, Minneapolis	Lehigh	
2024	Jackson McAndrew	Wayzata High School, Plymouth	Creighton	
2025	Chase Thompson	Alexandria Area High School, Alexandria	Clemson	
2026	Christian Wiggins	Wayzata High School, Plymouth	Iowa State	

== Most winners ==
By university
Number	University
20	Minnesota
4	Duke
2	Cal Poly
2	Gonzaga
2	Iowa State
2	St. Cloud State
1	Augustana (SD)
1	Clemson
1	Colorado State
1	Connecticut
1	Creighton
1	Dayton
1	East Carolina
1	Eastern Kentucky
1	Harvard
1	Illinois State
1	Lehigh
1	Marquette
1	Miami (OH)
1	Michigan State
1	Minnesota State
1	Montana State
1	Nebraska
1	North Carolina
1	North Dakota
1	Northeastern Illinois
1	Northwestern
1	Ohio
1	Omaha
1	Seton Hall
1	South Dakota State
1	Western Kentucky
1	West Virginia
1	Wisconsin

By high school
Number	High school
6	Hopkins High School
4	Minneapolis North High School
3	Mounds View High School
2	Minnehaha Academy
2	Park Center Senior High School
2	Prior Lake High School
2	DeLaSalle High School
2	Champlin Park High School
2	Apple Valley High School
2	Wayzata High School
1	Academy of Holy Angels
1	Alexandria Area High School
1	Bemidji High School
1	Benilde-St. Margaret's School
1	Bloomington Jefferson High School
1	Braham High School
1	Chaska High School
1	Chisholm High School
1	Coon Rapids High School
1	Duluth Central High School
1	Duluth East High School
1	Eagan High School
1	Elk River High School
1	Faribault High School
1	Hibbing High School
1	Irondale High School
1	Lake City High School
1	Minneapolis Roosevelt High School
1	Minnesota Transitions School
1	Minnetonka High School
1	Monticello High School
1	Owatonna High School
1	Park High School
1	St. Louis Park High School
1	Totino-Grace High School
1	Waseca High School

== See also ==
- Minnesota Miss Basketball
