= Tyus Jones =

American basketball player (born 1996)

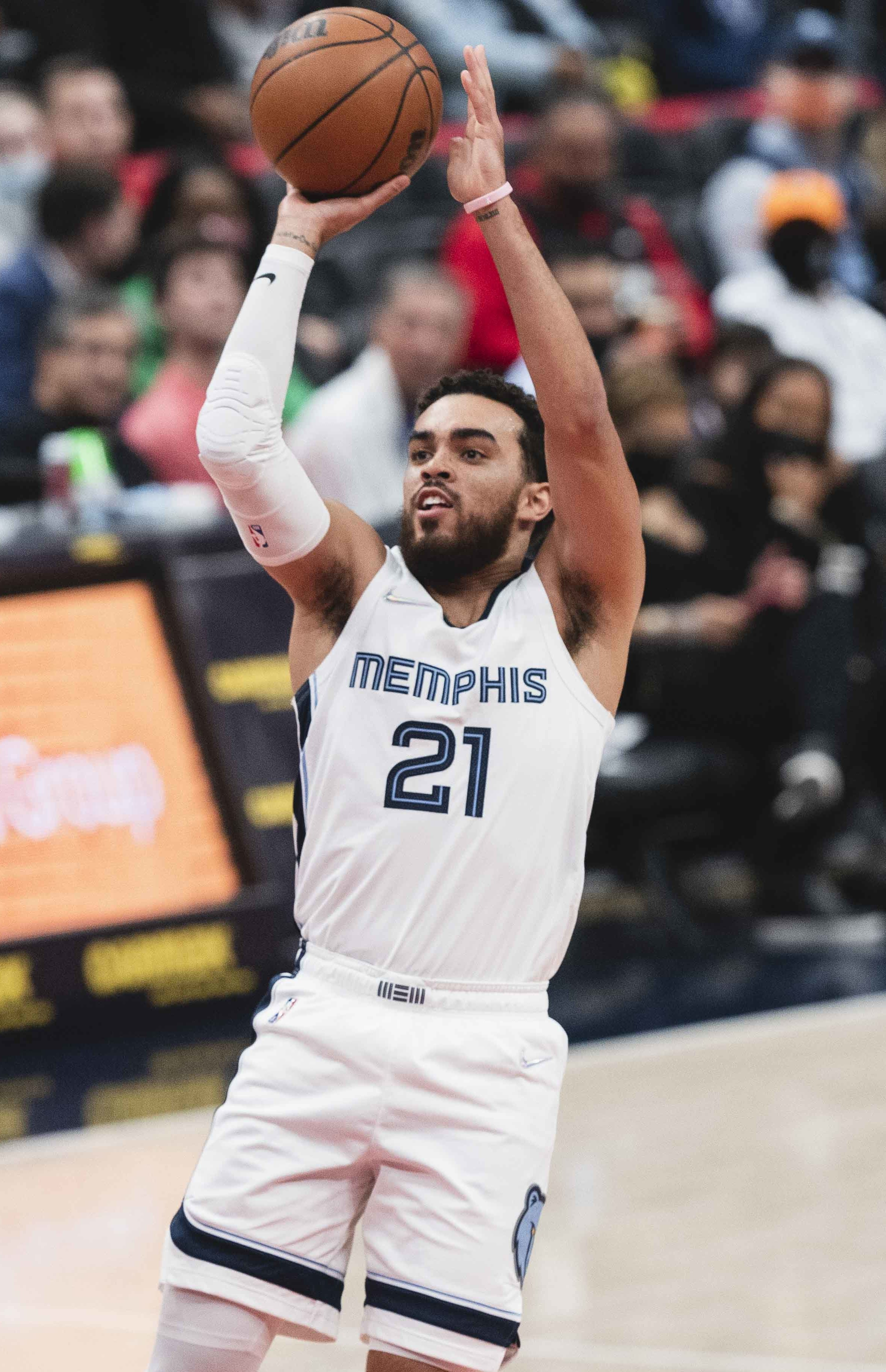
- Jones with the Memphis Grizzlies in 2021

No. 5 – Denver Nuggets
- Position: Point guard
- League: NBA

Personal information
- Born: May 10, 1996 (age 30) Burnsville, Minnesota, U.S.
- Listed height: 6 ft 1 in (1.85 m)
- Listed weight: 196 lb (89 kg)

Career information
- High school: Apple Valley (Apple Valley, Minnesota)
- College: Duke (2014–2015)
- NBA draft: 2015: 1st round, 24th overall pick
- Drafted by: Cleveland Cavaliers
- Playing career: 2015–present

Career history
- 2015–2019: Minnesota Timberwolves
- 2015–2016: →Idaho Stampede
- 2019–2023: Memphis Grizzlies
- 2023–2024: Washington Wizards
- 2024–2025: Phoenix Suns
- 2025–2026: Orlando Magic
- 2026: Dallas Mavericks
- 2026–present: Denver Nuggets

Career highlights
- NCAA champion (2015); NCAA Final Four Most Outstanding Player (2015); AP honorable mention All-American (2015); Third-team All-ACC (2015); McDonald's All-American (2014); Minnesota Mr. Basketball (2014)
- Stats at NBA.com
- Stats at Basketball Reference
Medals
Men's basketball
Representing the United States
FIBA Americas U18 Championship
Gold medal – first place	2014 United States	National team
FIBA World U17 Championship
Gold medal – first place	2012 Lithuania	National team
FIBA Americas U16 Championship
Gold medal – first place	2011 Mexico	National team

Tyus Robert Jones (born May 10, 1996) is an American professional basketball player for the Denver Nuggets of the National Basketball Association (NBA). He played college basketball for the Duke Blue Devils in his freshman season as part of the 2014–15 National Championship team. He is the older brother of NBA player Tre Jones.

A point guard, Jones was ranked among the top 10 players in the national high school class of 2014 by Rivals.com, Scout.com and ESPN. He was a Minnesota State High School League (MSHSL) Class 4A state champion, three-time Minnesota Associated Press Boys Basketball Player of the Year and three-time Minnesota Boys Basketball Gatorade Player of the Year for Apple Valley High School. He played in the 2014 McDonald's All-American Boys Game, 2014 Jordan Brand Classic and the 2014 Nike Hoop Summit. He won the skills competition at the 2014 McDonald's All-American Game and posted the only double-double in the 2014 Jordan Brand Classic.

Jones committed to the Duke University men's basketball team as a package with Jahlil Okafor. He was a 2014 USA Today second team All-USA Boys Basketball Team selection. At Duke, he was an All-ACC third team and All-ACC Freshman first team selection. He earned NCAA basketball tournament Most Outstanding Player during Duke's victory in the championship game of the 2015 NCAA Division I men's basketball tournament. Subsequently, he announced he would enter the 2015 NBA draft. He was selected with the 24th overall pick by the Cleveland Cavaliers and traded to the Minnesota Timberwolves.

With his hometown team the Minnesota Timberwolves for four seasons, Jones went on to set the NBA single-season assist to turnover ratio record (6.96). He then signed with the Memphis Grizzlies in the 2019 offseason, and lead the league for four years in a row, breaking his own assist to turnover single-season record with 7.04. He became a starter to earn his sixth consecutive assist to turnover ratio title, setting a new NBA record of 7.35. After four seasons with the team, he was traded to the Washington Wizards with whom he played for one season before signing with the Phoenix Suns in 2024.

== High school career ==
Jones earned the role as a varsity starter for Apple Valley High School as an eighth grader for the 2009–10 season. That year, he averaged 16.8 points per game and 8.1 assists per game, starting every game for a team that went 20–8. That season he received his first recruiting letter (at age 13) from USC.

=== Freshman season ===
As a freshman, Jones received his first scholarship offer from Iowa. That season, he averaged 20.1 points, 7.1 assists and 2.6 steals per game in 16 games, after missing 7 weeks due to a lacerated kidney. Following his freshman season, he was invited to attend separate skills camps hosted by LeBron James and Chris Paul. However, he was also invited by USA Basketball to the United States Olympic Training Center in Colorado Springs, Colorado to be one of 27 athletes try out for the 12-man FIBA Americas Under-16 Championship team, which he eventually was selected to. Team USA won the tournament. By the time he attended the July 2011 Amateur Athletic Union (AAU) Peach Jam tournament he already had offers from Minnesota and Baylor. In the days after the four-day tournament that was attended by leading coaches such as Thad Matta, Tom Izzo, Jim Boeheim, Roy Williams, John Calipari, Josh Pastner, Bill Self, Sean Miller and Rick Pitino, he received offers from Ohio State, Michigan State, Marquette, Providence, Arizona and Iowa State.

=== Sophomore season ===
As a sophomore, he was a unanimous selection as the 2012 Minnesota Associated Press Player of the Year for high school boys basketball and was named to the 2012 Associated Press All-state team along with Siyani Chambers, Joey King, Tyler Vaughan and Johnny Woodard. Jones' Apple Valley team was eliminated in the MSHSL Class 4A, Section 3 final by Eastview High School. Jones averaged 28 points and 8 assists in 31 minutes per game. He earned the 2012 Minnesota Boys Basketball Gatorade Player of the Year. He was the 2012 Star Tribune Metro Player of the Year in boys' basketball as well as the Pioneer Press' boys basketball player of the year. By the end of his sophomore season, he had an offer from Duke to go along with his earlier offers from Minnesota, Iowa State, Michigan State, Ohio State, Providence, Arizona, Baylor and Marquette. Following the season, Jones again played for Team USA at the 2012 FIBA Under-17 World Championship in Kaunas, Lithuania from June 29 – July 8, 2012. The team went undefeated in 8 games.

=== Junior season ===
Jones entered his 2012–13 junior season as the national class of 2014's top ranked basketball player according to ESPN. Sports Illustrated columnist Frank Burlison listed him second to Jahlil Okafor on August 16, 2012. On September 11, when Okafor was named a monthly blogger for USA Today High School Sports, he noted that he and Jones wanted to attend a Michigan State Spartans football game together. Jones was one of 10 USA Today preseason All-USA selections (along with Aaron Gordon, Andrew Harrison, Aaron Harrison, Kasey Hill, Okafor, Jabari Parker, Julius Randle, Noah Vonleh, Andrew Wiggins). At the January 5, 2013, Timberwolves Shootout at the Target Center, Jones led Apple Valley on a 31–9 run to overcome an 11-point deficit with 9 minutes and 19 seconds remaining against Rashad Vaughn and Robbinsdale Cooper High School. The head-to-head matchup of class of 2014 guards Jones and Vaughn was described as "arguably the best individual-to-individual matchup in Minnesota high school basketball history" by the Star Tribune. Two weeks before the matchup of ESPN 100 top 10 high school players, NBA.com had anticipated the matchup with a feature story. Following his junior season, he was co-winner of the Minnesota Associated Press Player of the Year award for high school boys basketball, with DeLaSalle fellow junior Reid Travis. Jones led Apple Valley to the MSHSL Class 4A championship, while Travis led DeLaSalle to the 3A championship. They were joined on the Associated Press All-State team by Anders Broman, Rashad Vaughn and Graham Woodward. Jones earned the 2013 Minnesota Boys Basketball Gatorade Player of the Year and the Pioneer Press player of the year. However, Travis was the 2013 Star Tribune Metro Player of the Year in boys' basketball. Following the season, Jones was selected by HighSchoolHardwood.com as one of two juniors (along with Okafor) on its first or second five selections of its 2012–13 High School Hardwood All-American teams. Stanley Johnson was the only other junior on the 20-man All-American First Team.

On March 9 Jones listed his final seven schools: Baylor, Duke, Kentucky, Kansas, Michigan State, Minnesota and Ohio State. Jones had unofficially visited all seven of these schools before his junior season ended. In late April 2013, Okafor's father believed it was very possible that Okafor and Jones would matriculate together as a package. By late April, there were rumors that Cliff Alexander and Justise Winslow would attend whatever school Jones and Okafor attended.

=== Senior season ===
On May 30, Okafor cut his list of schools to eight: Arizona, Baylor, Duke, Illinois, Kentucky, Kansas, Michigan State and Ohio State, which overlapped with Jones in six schools. Although Alexander was ranked as the fifth best player in the class of 2014 by Rivals.com and had offers from four of the six schools common to both by the beginning of June, he said the chances of him matriculating with Jones and Okafor was slim. As the summer evaluation period continued, the unique nature of the possibility of Okafor and Jones, who are not related and not teammates, going to college as a package continued to get a lot of press. Jones was co-MVP for the 2013 Under Armour Elite 24 All-star game's winning team. On August 13, Jones announced that he would take official visits to four schools Baylor August 30 – September 1; Kentucky September 27–29; Kansas October 18–20; and Duke October 25–27. Notably, Duke, which is the favorite according to Star Tribune writer Amelia Rayno, is scheduled last. On August 14, Jones confirmed that he might make a fifth official visit (the maximum allowed by the NCAA) to Minnesota, although they remained an unlikely underdog. Okafor visited Baylor on August 29 with Jones as the two were ranked 1–2 in the Rivals.com class of 2014 rankings. One of the reasons Baylor was a serious contender is that Jared Nuness, a member of the Baylor basketball staff, is Jones' cousin.

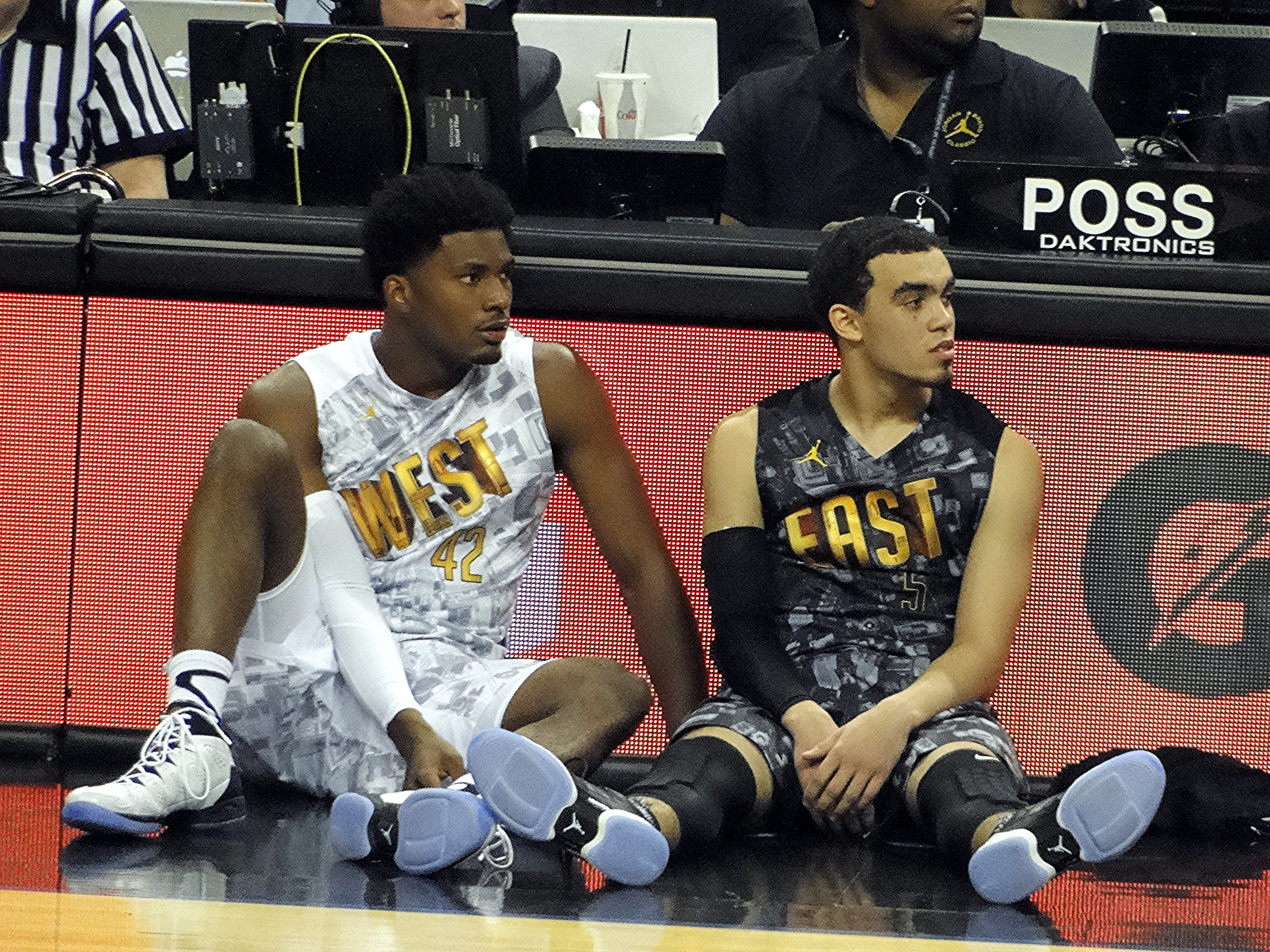
Jones (right) and Justise Winslow (left) in the April 18, 2014 Jordan Brand Classic

On September 4, 2013, Rivals.com updated their ranking with Jones slipping from 2nd to 5th (behind Emmanuel Mudiay, Johnson and Alexander) and the top point guard position to second (behind Mudiay). Rivals clarified that Okafor and Jones, who are considered a package deal, had visited Baylor together and would visit both Kansas and Duke together, but that they would visit Kentucky separately. On September 13, class of 2014 point guard Tyler Ulis committed to Kentucky. Subsequently, Jones canceled his September 27–29 visit to Kentucky. As Okafor and Jones visited Kansas and Duke together during the last two weekends of October, those two schools were considered the favorites for the services of both. At Kansas, head coach Bill Self scheduled a second open practice for the weekend of the Okafor/Jones visit. ESPN.com's number 14 overall prospect Winslow attended Duke for an official visit the same weekend that Okafor and Jones did. At the beginning of October, rumors began that Jones and Okafor would meet in a nationally televised game on December 12 that could be the first regular season high school basketball game ever broadcast on ESPN from Minnesota. On November 15, ESPN announced the high school basketball broadcast schedule for its family of networks and the rumors were verified. On November 2, Jones reduced his list to Baylor, Kansas and Duke and was still committed to joint matriculation with Okafor.

On November 7 Jones was ranked fifth behind points leader Mudiay, Alexander, Okafor and Stanley Johnson in the Mr. Basketball USA preseason tracker. He had the most points of all players without any first place votes. The preseason points leader has gone on to win the award in four of the prior five years. On November 11, Jones and Okafor tweeted simultaneously that they would make simultaneous verbal commitments on November 15 from their local high schools. His verbal commitment announcement was scheduled on the same date as Alexander and Stanley Johnson. According to ESPN, all four were among the top 10 in the national class (Okafor #1, Alexander #3, Jones #4 and Johnson #9). On the eve of their announcement, Duke was the heavy favorite to land Jones and Okafor. He made his verbal commitment on ESPNU to Duke basketball on November 15. Prior to his senior season, USA Today named him to its 10-man preseason All-USA team along with Alexander, Stanley Johnson, Trey Lyles, Mudiay, Malik Newman, Okafor, Kelly Oubre, D'Angelo Russell, and Myles Turner. On November 21, Winslow committed to Duke, giving them the number one recruiting class in the nation with Jones, Okafor, Winslow and Grayson Allen all committed.

On December 12, Apple Valley had a 5–0 record (including victories over state powerhouses DeLaSalle—with a sidelined Reid Travis—and Hopkins) and national rankings of 41 by USA Today and 16 by MaxPreps, while Whitney Young entered the game 1–1 with a 34 ranking. That day, in front of Mike Krzyzewski and ESPN2's national audience, Okafor's Whitney Young beat Jones' Apple Valley 80–70. Okafor had 22 points and 15 rebounds, while Jones had 29 points, 5 rebounds and 6 assists. On January 4 in the Timberwolves Shootout at the Target Center, Jones led Apple Valley over the Kansas defending Class 6A champion Blue Valley High School who was ranked number 18 by USA Today at the time. On March 6, 2014, Defending state champion Apple Valley lost to Cretin-Derham Hall High School 89–77 in double overtime in the Class 4A Section 3 championship despite 35 points from Jones, ending his high school career.

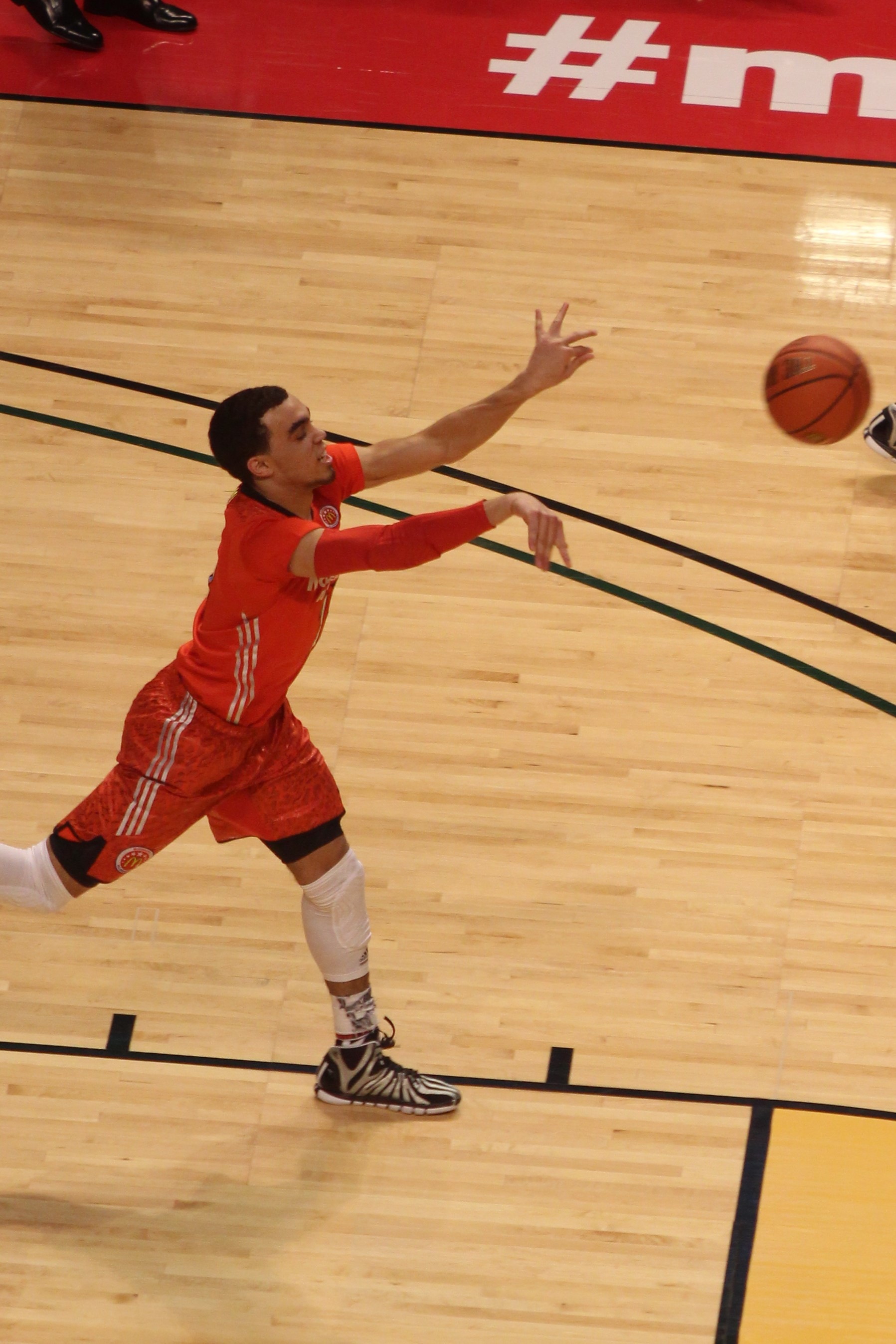
Jones in the 2014 McDonald's All-American Boys Game

Jones won the skills competition at the McDonald's All-American Game on March 31. In the April 2, 2014, McDonald's All-American Game Jones posted 7 points and a game-high 10 assists for the losing east team. 5 of the 7 points came in the final 2 minutes as the east briefly recovered the lead from a 99–95 deficit before losing 105–102. On April 12, he posted a 13-point 6-assist 5-steal effort in an 84–73 Team USA Nike Hoops Summit victory over the world team. On April 18 in the Jordan Brand Classic, he posted the only double-double with 10 points, a game-high 12 assists and 7 rebounds.

==== Awards and honors ====
Jones was selected to the 10-man Team USA for the 17th annual Nike Hoop Summit on April 12, 2014, at the Moda Center. He was selected along with fellow Duke commits Okafor and Winslow. and the 24-player 37th annual April 2, 2014 McDonald's All-American Boys Game at the United Center. He was joined as a McDonald's All-American by fellow Minnesotans Reid Travis and Rashad Vaughn as well as fellow Duke commits Okafor, Winslow and Grayson Allen. On March 10 he was one of 26 players selected for the April 18, 2014, Jordan Brand Classic again along with fellow Minnesotans Travis and Vaughn as well as fellow Duke commits Okafor, Winslow and Allen. On March 17, he won Associated Press Co-Player of the Year (with J. P. Macura). On March 18, he was named as one of three finalists for the McDonald's All-American Morgan Wootten National Player of the Year (along with Stanley Johnson and Cliff Alexander). On March 20, Jones was named Minnesota Mr. Basketball. The following day he won his third consecutive Minnesota Gatorade Player of the Year Award. He was a 2014 USA Today second team All-USA Boys Basketball Team selection and a second team All-American according to MaxPreps.

=== Rankings and comparison ===
By the summer after his 2010–11 freshman season, he was described as the best point guard from the state of Minnesota since Khalid El-Amin. Another Minnesotan who was a measuring stick for Jones was Sam Jacobson. Bleacher Report's Kerry Miller suggested when he played for Duke Jones would likely finish among the top five in the nation in assists per game but would need to work on his defense.

College recruiting
Name	Hometown	School	Height	Weight	Commit date
Tyus Jones; PG	Apple Valley, MN	Apple Valley (MN)	6 ft 2 in (1.88 m)	195 lb (88 kg)	Nov 15, 2013
Tyus Jones; PG	Recruit ratings: Scout: Rivals: 247Sports: ESPN: (97)				
Overall recruit ranking: Scout: 9, 2 (PG) Rivals: 7, 2 (PG) ESPN: 4, 1 (MN), 1 (PG)
Note: In many cases, Scout, Rivals, 247Sports, On3, and ESPN may conflict in their listings of height and weight.; In these cases, the average was taken. ESPN grades are on a 100-point scale.; Sources: "Duke 2014 Basketball Commitments". Rivals.; "2014 Duke Basketball Commits". Scout.; "ESPN". ESPN.; "Scout.com Team Recruiting Rankings". Scout.; "2014 Team Ranking". Rivals.

== Recruiting ==
Jones was one of the most sought after recruits in 2014, ranking 4th overall in ESPN's top 100, behind eventual teammate Jahlil Okafor, Myles Turner, and Cliff Alexander. He was a 2014 USA Today second team All-USA Boys Basketball Team selection. Two years prior to being recruited, Jones made a pact with Okafor to one day play at the same college together. Jones received scholarship offers from Duke, Baylor, Kentucky, Minnesota, Kansas, Michigan State, and Ohio State. Despite playing high school basketball just a short distance from the University of Minnesota–Twin Cities, Jones never granted Minnesota an official visit. In 2013, Jones made official visits to Baylor on August 31, Kentucky on September 2, Kansas on October 19, and Duke on October 26. On October 31, just a few days after finishing his official visits, Jones appeared on a radio show on WGVX-FM 105.1 Minneapolis, and listed Kansas, Baylor and Duke as his top three schools, leaving the hometown Gophers off of his list.

Shortly after, Jones and Okafor narrowed their list down to Duke and Kansas. On November 15, 2013, Jones and Okafor appeared on ESPNU to announce their decision. ESPN's Adam Finkelstein described the decision as "making college basketball history" with their joint commitment to the Duke University men's basketball team. Though it was thought that he might follow Jones and Okafor, Cliff Alexander announced his commitment to Kansas shortly after. On November 22, Justise Winslow announced he would join Jones and Okafor at Duke, marking the third player in ESPN's top 15 recruits to commit to Duke that year. Grayson Allen, the 21st ranked player in that class, later joined Jones, Okafor, and Winslow.

== College career ==
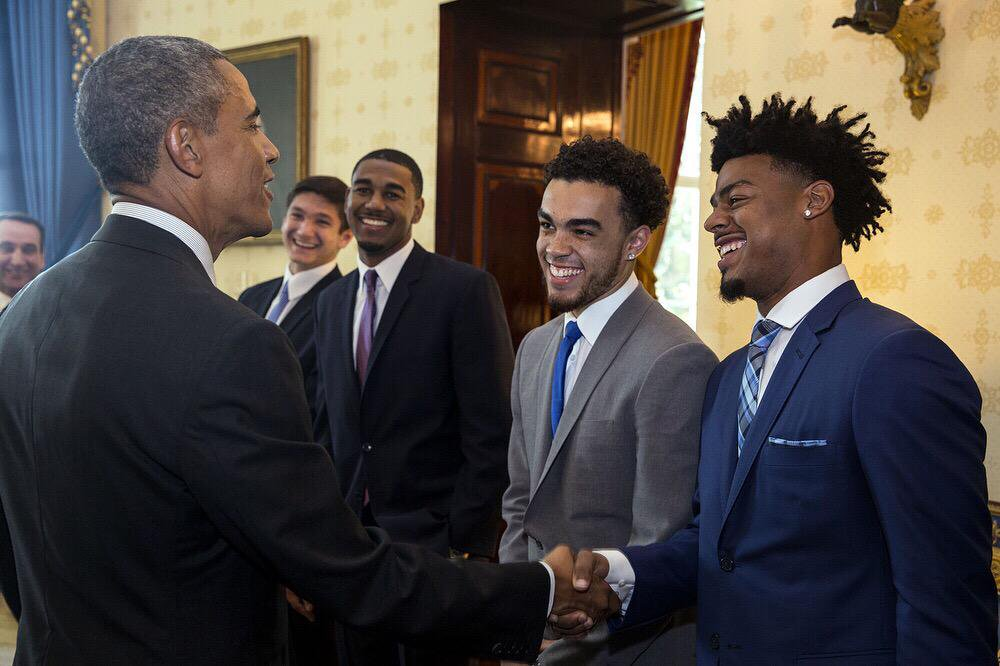
Jones meeting President Barack Obama with Duke teammates in 2015

As he entered his freshman season at Duke, he was expected to battle with senior point guard Quinn Cook and junior guard Rasheed Sulaimon for playing time following the graduation of Tyler Thornton. Well before the season there were expectations that Jones would win the starting point guard position. Thus, he was selected by USA Today to its Preseason All-American second team and by CBS Sports to its Preseason All-American third team. In its preseason top 100 player ranking, Jones was listed at number 45 by ESPN. Jones was named to the 36-man Bob Cousy Award Preseason Watch List. He was also listed as a John R. Wooden Award Preseason Top 50 candidate and a Wayman Tisdale Award Watch List selection. Jones was also included in the early December Naismith Award top 50 watch list.

Jones began the season starting alongside Cook, with Sulaimon coming off the bench. On November 14, he debuted with 15 points and 7 assists against Presbyterian. He posted 17 points against #19 Michigan State on November 18 in the 2014 State Farm Champions Classic. On November 30, Jones posted a season-high 10 assists along with 16 points for his first career double-double against Army. In the ACC–Big Ten Challenge against #2 Wisconsin, Jones led the way to an 80–70 victory with 22 points, 6 rebounds and 4 assists, which were all team highs. For his performance, Jones earned ACC Rookie of the week and Wayman Tisdale National Freshman of the Week award. He was named to the John R. Wooden Award Midseason Top 25 list on January 14. Jones tied his career high on January 19 with 22 points against Pittsburgh in Mike Krzyzewski's 999th career victory, and on January 25 he also had 22 points against St. John's in Krzyzewski's 1000th career victory. As a result of these two performances, Jones earned ACC Co-Rookies of the Week honors along with Xavier Rathan-Mayes. Jones posted a season-high tying and game-high tying 22 points as well as 8 assists against North Carolina in his first Carolina–Duke rivalry game on February 18. He scored the team's final nine points in the final 1:25 of regulation to force overtime and became the first player in the rivalry to score tally 22 points, 8 assists and 7 rebounds since assists became official stats in 1983–84. As a result, he earned both ACC Rookie of the Week and Wayman Tisdale National Freshman of the Week recognition. On March 9, Jones earned his fourth ACC Freshman of the Week honor after a week that included a new career high with 24 points in the rematch against North Carolina on March 7.

Following the 2014–15 Atlantic Coast Conference men's basketball season, Jones was named to the All-ACC third team and was among a trio that was the first to be selected to the All-ACC Freshman first team (along with Okafor and Winslow). He was also recognized by the Associated Press as an honorable mention selection for its All-America team. He earned NCAA basketball tournament Most Outstanding Player by scoring 23 points with 5 rebounds in the championship game of the 2015 NCAA Division I men's basketball tournament. In 2015, the mayor of his hometown in Apple Valley pronounced April 22 as "Tyus Jones Day". On April 15, 2015, Jones announced he would enter the 2015 NBA draft, forgoing his final three years of college eligibility.

== Professional career ==
=== Minnesota Timberwolves (2015–2019) ===
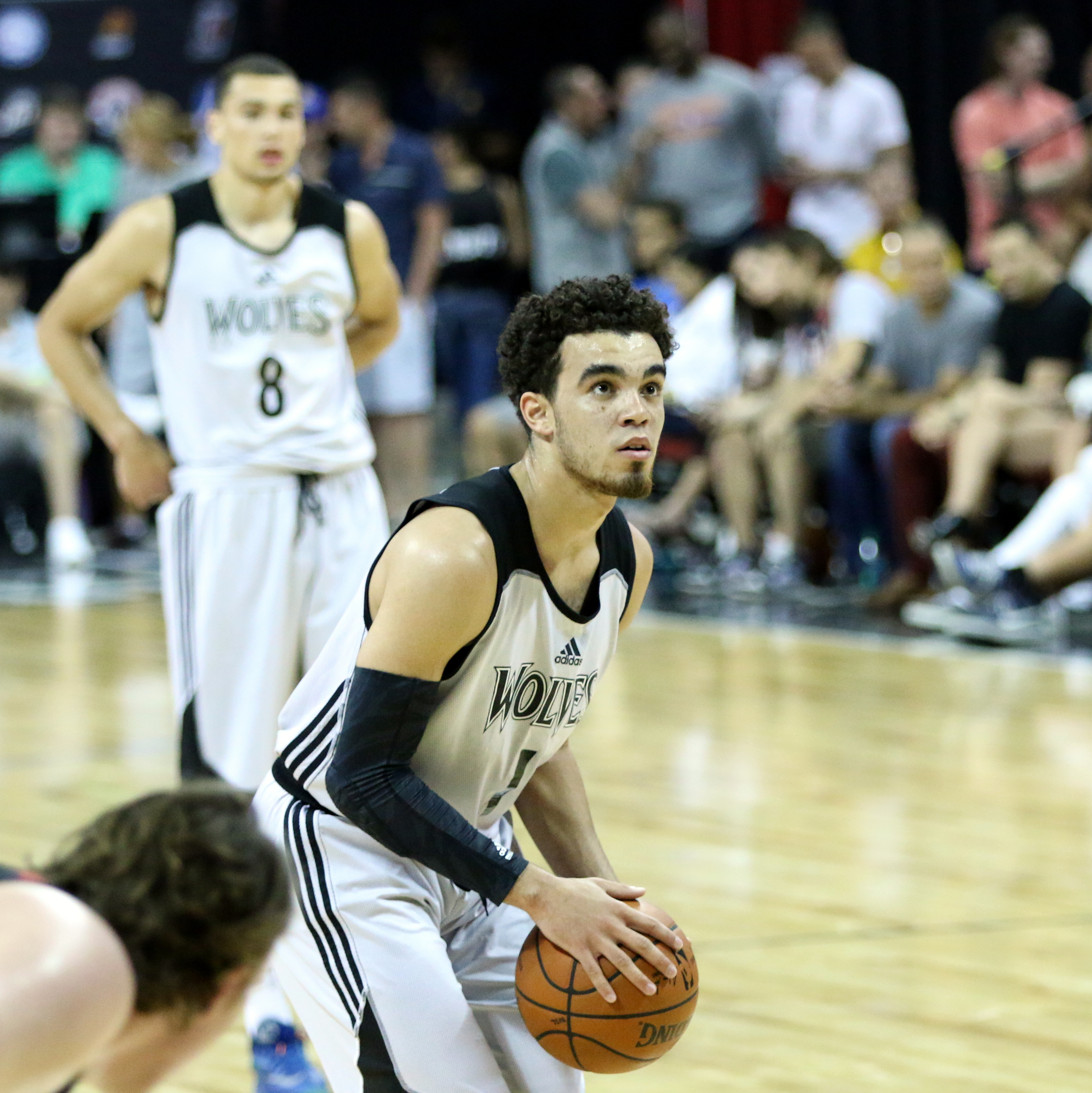
Jones during the 2015 NBA Summer League

Jones was selected with the 24th overall pick in the 2015 NBA draft by the Cleveland Cavaliers, who then traded his draft rights to his hometown team, the Minnesota Timberwolves, in exchange for a 2019 second round draft pick and the draft rights to Cedi Osman and Rakeem Christmas. On July 7, 2015, he signed his rookie scale contract with the Timberwolves.

On November 10, Jones made his NBA debut against the Charlotte Hornets, posting his first assist, steal, rebound and point. On December 5, the Timberwolves assigned Jones to the Idaho Stampede, the D-League affiliate of the Utah Jazz. On December 22, he was recalled by the Timberwolves after he averaged 24.7 points, 3.9 rebounds, 5.0 assists and 1.5 steals in 35.2 minutes per game in six starts in the D-League. He made his first NBA field goals on December 23 against the San Antonio Spurs, scoring 6 points in 20 minutes. By late February, head coach Sam Mitchell noted that Jones would be getting sufficient playing time to be evaluated.

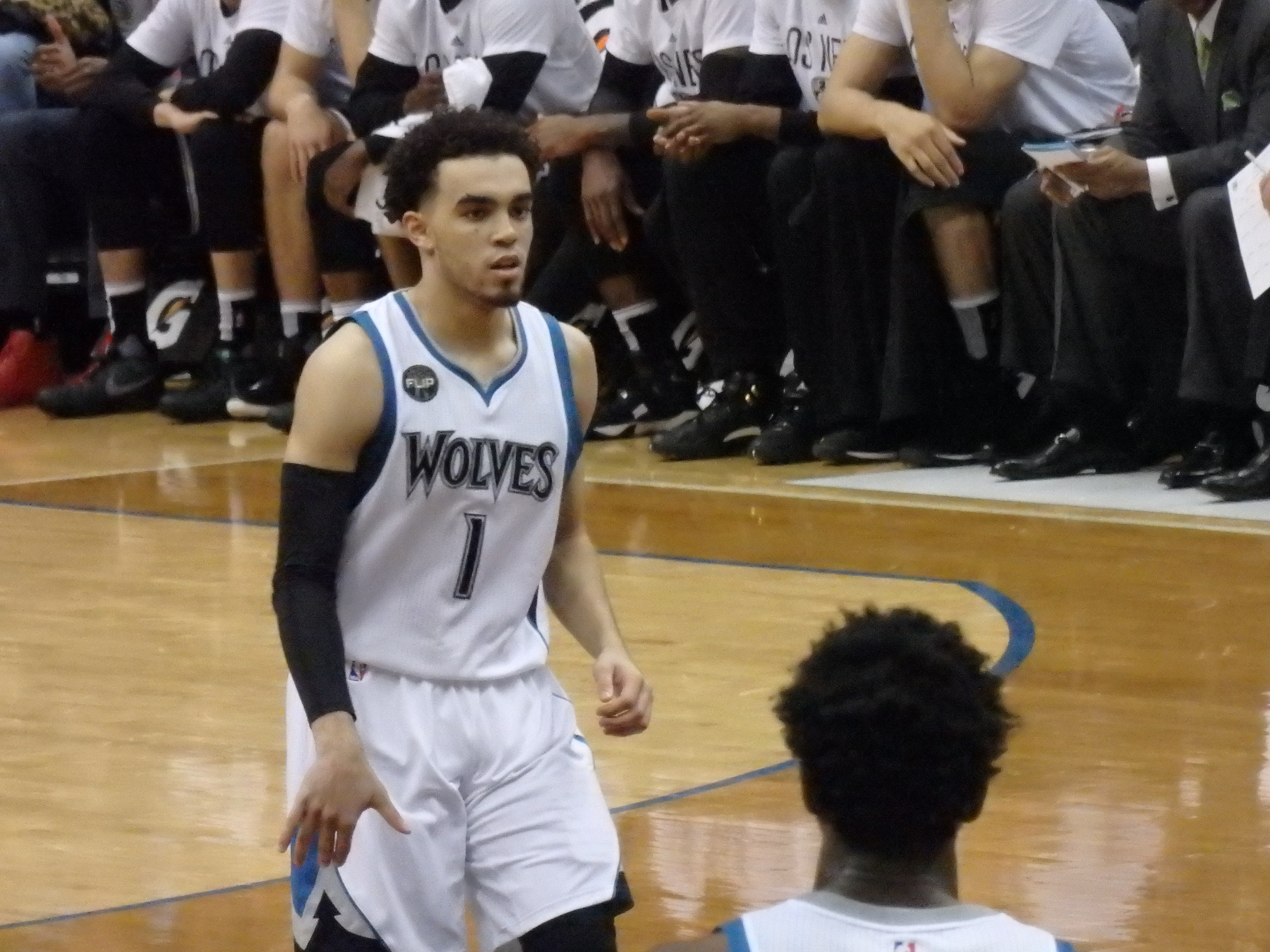
Jones with the Timberwolves in 2016

Jones was named the MVP of the 2016 NBA Summer League. Jones made his season debut on November 1 with 6 assists in the Timberwolves' third game against the Memphis Grizzlies. On November 8, Jones posted career highs with 12 points and 5 steals as well as a career-high tying 5 rebounds to go along with a game-high 7 assists against the Brooklyn Nets. When Rubio did not play in the April 12, 2017, regular season finale against the Houston Rockets, Jones posted a career-high with 16 assists.

The 2017–18 Minnesota Timberwolves entered training camp with just Jones and Jeff Teague at point guard. When Teague was sidelined for the last four games in November, Jones averaged 11.3 points, 6.5 assists and four steals per game over 38.5 minutes. In the second of those four games, Jones posted a career-high seven steals and a career-high tying two blocked shots in his first career NBA start against the Phoenix Suns on November 26, 2017.

On December 17, 2018, Jones posted his first 10-point, 10-assist double double against the Sacramento Kings. Jones closed out the year on December 31 with a career-high 13-assist performance and season-high 15 points against the New Orleans Pelicans. On April 7, Jones tied his career high with 13 assists against the Oklahoma City Thunder. Jones ended the season with an NBA-record-setting 6.96 (min 200 assists) single-season assist to turnover ratio.

=== Memphis Grizzlies (2019–2023) ===
On July 11, 2019, Jones signed a three-year deal worth $26.4 million with the Memphis Grizzlies after the Timberwolves refused to match the offer sheet. Jones repeated as NBA assists to turnover ratio leader for the 2019–20 season and 2020–21 season.

On February 1, 2021, Jones posted a career-high 14 assists against the San Antonio Spurs.

With Ja Morant sidelined on February 15, 2022, Jones started and posted a career-high 27 points against the New Orleans Pelicans. Jones broke his own record in the 2021–22 season with a 7.04 assist to turnover ratio. The 2021–22 Grizzlies went 20–5 in regular season games with Morant sidelined, and Jones started 23 of those 25 games.

On July 6, 2022, Jones re-signed with the Grizzlies on a two-year, $30 million contract.

On March 17, 2023, Jones had his first NBA career triple-double with 20 points, 10 rebounds and 10 assists in an overtime victory over his brother's San Antonio Spurs. The next night he posted 14 assists with zero turnovers against the Golden State Warriors. Jones led the NBA in assists:turnover ratio for a fifth consecutive season. (Note: Note that some public databases present Monté Morris as if he was tied or above Jones in this statistic for the 2022–23 season. However Sports Reference shows that Jones had a 417:74 ratio (5.635) and Morris had a 326:60 ratio (5.433).)

=== Washington Wizards (2023–2024) ===
On June 22, 2023, the Grizzlies traded Jones to the Washington Wizards as part of a three-team deal that sent Kristaps Porziņģis to the Boston Celtics and Marcus Smart to the Grizzlies. The trade also involved the Grizzlies sending a 2023 first-round pick (pick No. 25) and a top-four-protected 2024 first-round pick (via the Golden State Warriors) to the Celtics. Additionally, the Wizards acquired Danilo Gallinari, Mike Muscala, and Boston's 2023 second-round pick (pick No. 35). On December 15, Jones posted his second career triple-double 13 points, 11 assists and 10 rebounds against the Indiana Pacers. On February 27, 2024, Jones posted a career-high 17 assists against the Golden State Warriors. He again led the league with a 7.3 assist:turnover ratio, this time as a full-time starter for the first time.

=== Phoenix Suns (2024–2025) ===
On July 30, 2024, Jones signed with the Phoenix Suns. Jones would take Phoenix's offer over other offers where he would have had more money and guaranteed years in mind due to the opportunity where he'd play for a contending team as a starting point guard. Jones debuted for the Suns on October 23 against the Los Angeles Clippers with an eight-assist/zero-turnover performance, which was the most assists without a turnover by a Sun in a debut since the 1976 ABA–NBA merger. After leading the NBA in assist to turnover ratio six consecutive seasons, he finished second in 2024–25.

=== Orlando Magic (2025–2026) ===
On July 6, 2025, Jones signed with the Orlando Magic on a one-year, $7 million deal. Jones made 48 appearances (including eight starts) for Orlando during the 2025–26 season, recording averages of 3.0 points, 1.1 rebounds, and 2.4 assists.

=== Dallas Mavericks (2026) ===
On February 4, 2026, Jones was traded to the Charlotte Hornets along with two second-round picks in exchange for cash considerations. The next day, Jones was traded to the Dallas Mavericks in a three-team trade involving the Washington Wizards. He made eight appearances (including two starts) for Dallas, averaging 3.9 points, 1.1 rebounds, and 3.8 assists. On February 28, the Mavericks announced that they had waived Jones to make cap space to sign Ryan Nembhard on a standard two-way contract.

=== Denver Nuggets (2026–present) ===
On March 5, 2026, Jones signed with the Denver Nuggets. Although, Jones' 6.36 assist:turnover ratio for the season was the highest in the league, his 159 assists was below the 200 assist qualifying minimum, leaving T. J. McConnell with (4.48) as the official statisitical leader. He made 11 appearances (including two starts) for the Nuggets, averaging 2.2 points, 1.3 rebounds, and 1.2 assists.

On July 2, 2026, Jones re-signed with Denver on a one-year minimum contract. Jones' October 22, debut with the team marked his 750th career game.

== Career statistics ==
Legend
GP	Games played	GS	Games started	MPG	Minutes per game
FG%	Field goal percentage	3P%	3-point field goal percentage	FT%	Free throw percentage
RPG	Rebounds per game	APG	Assists per game	SPG	Steals per game
BPG	Blocks per game	PPG	Points per game	**Bold**	Career high
*	Led the league

=== NBA ===
==== Regular season ====
Year	Team	GP	GS	MPG	FG%	3P%	FT%	RPG	APG	SPG	BPG	PPG
2015–16	Minnesota	37	0	15.5	.359	.302	.718	1.3	2.9	.8	.1	4.2
2016–17	Minnesota	60	0	12.9	.414	.356	.767	1.1	2.6	.8	.1	3.5
2017–18	Minnesota	**82***	11	17.9	.457	.349	.877	1.6	2.8	**1.2**	.1	5.1
2018–19	Minnesota	68	23	22.9	.415	.317	.841	2.0	4.8	**1.2**	.1	6.9
2019–20	Memphis	65	6	19.0	.459	.379	.741	1.6	4.4	.9	.1	7.4
2020–21	Memphis	70	9	17.5	.431	.321	.911	2.0	3.7	.9	.1	6.3
2021–22	Memphis	73	23	21.2	.451	.390	.818	2.4	4.4	.9	.0	8.7
2022–23	Memphis	80	22	24.2	.438	.371	.800	2.5	5.2	1.0	.1	10.3
2023–24	Washington	66	**66**	**29.3**	**.489**	**.414**	.800	**2.7**	**7.3**	1.1	**.3**	**12.0**
2024–25	Phoenix	81	58	26.8	.448	**.414**	.895	2.4	5.3	.9	.1	10.2
2025–26	Orlando	48	8	15.7	.342	.294	**1.000**	1.1	2.4	.7	.1	3.0
2025–26	Dallas	8	2	16.6	.382	.211	500	1.1	3.8	.4	.0	3.9
2025–26	Denver	11	2	8.4	.346	.375	.000	1.3	1.2	.1	.0	2.2
Career		749	230	20.6	.441	.372	.820	1.9	4.2	.9	.1	7.3

==== Playoffs ====
Year	Team	GP	GS	MPG	FG%	3P%	FT%	RPG	APG	SPG	BPG	PPG
2018	Minnesota	4	0	13.8	.286	.000	—	2.3	2.0	.3	.0	1.0
2021	Memphis	5	0	9.4	.353	.250	**1.000**	1.4	1.2	.2	.0	3.0
2022	Memphis	**12**	**3**	**21.8**	**.394**	**.400**	.933	**3.3**	**4.5**	1.2	**.2**	**9.2**
2023	Memphis	6	1	20.0	.306	.158	.667	3.0	3.7	**1.3**	.0	4.5
2026	Denver	3	0	10.0	.500	.000	.500	.0	1.7	.7	.0	3.0
Career		30	4	17.1	.371	.310	.864	2.4	3.2	.9	.1	5.5

=== College ===
Year	Team	GP	GS	MPG	FG%	3P%	FT%	RPG	APG	SPG	BPG	PPG
2014–15	Duke	39	39	33.9	.417	.379	.889	3.5	5.6	1.5	.1	11.8

== International career ==
Jones helped USA Basketball win gold at both the 2011 FIBA Americas Under-16 Championship and 2012 FIBA Under-17 World Championship. Jones' 28 assists over 5 games led the U16 team. The U17 team went undefeated in 8 games as Jones led the team with 43 assists. On May 5, 2014, USA Basketball announced the 21 athletes (including Jones) invited to tryout from June 10 to 19 for the 12-member USA national team for the June 20–24, 2014 FIBA Americas Under-18 Championship. Jones was one of 10 incoming freshman to be selected. Eventually, 24 players tried out for the team and the roster was cut to 15 on June 12. In the end, Jones made the final 12 man roster that was announced on June 15. The United States claimed a gold medal in the tournament as Jones served as captain.

== Personal life ==
Jones' parents are Rob and Debbie. He has three brothers: Tre, who plays for the Chicago Bulls, and two half-brothers, Jadee Jones and Reggie Bunch, who also played college basketball in the United States. His parents are divorced. Jones is from a basketball family. His mother, Debbie, also played point guard and led Devils Lake High School to the North Dakota high school championship. Rob Jones, his father, stands at 6 feet 6 inches (1.98 m) and played for University of Wisconsin–Parkside in the 1980s when they competed at the Division III level. His aunt Darcy Cascaes, DeLaSalle High School's athletic director, earned two high school state championships at Devils Lake and was an all-conference guard for University of North Dakota. Al Nuness, whom Tyus refers to as an uncle, was a captain for Minnesota Gophers basketball in the 1960s. His cousin Jared Nuness was 1997 Minnesota Gatorade player of the year and runner-up Minnesota Mr. Basketball.

Jones was named after Tyus Edney. Jones has been friends with Jahlil Okafor since age 8. Jones played American football quarterback in middle school and was also a respected baseball pitcher and shortstop. Jones has also represented Team USA in youth basketball competitions.

Jones and his longtime girlfriend Carrie Yeakey were engaged before the 2019-20 NBA season. Jones and his fiancée had a son Tyus Jr. on May 5, 2020.

== See also ==
- List of NBA regular season records
