= Kevin McHale (basketball) =

American basketball player (born 1957)

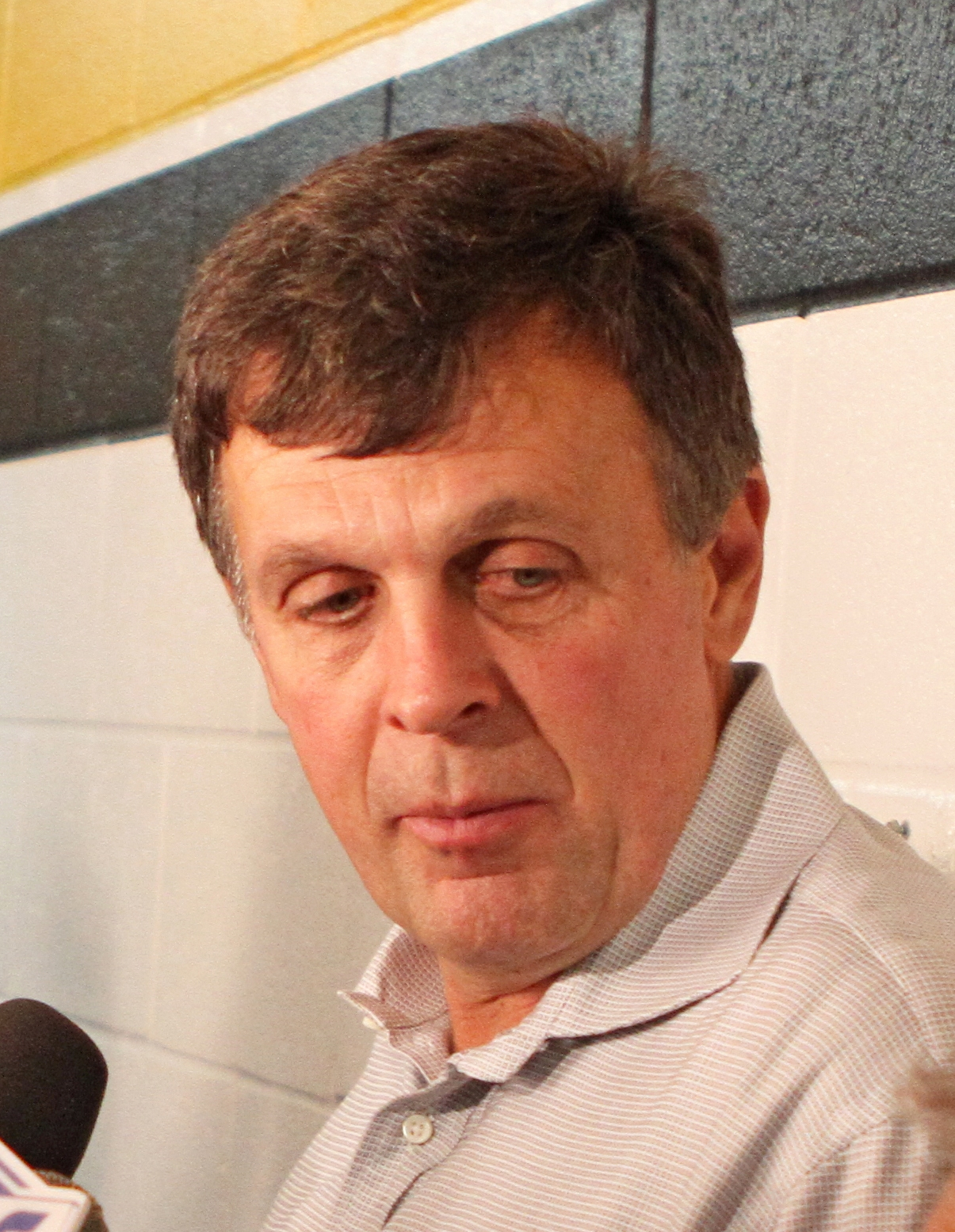
- McHale in a 2012 press conference

Personal information
- Born: December 19, 1957 (age 68) Hibbing, Minnesota, U.S.
- Listed height: 6 ft 10 in (2.08 m)
- Listed weight: 210 lb (95 kg)

Career information
- High school: Hibbing (Hibbing, Minnesota)
- College: Minnesota (1976–1980)
- NBA draft: 1980: 1st round, 3rd overall pick
- Drafted by: Boston Celtics
- Playing career: 1980–1993
- Position: Power forward
- Number: 32
- Coaching career: 2005–2015

Career history

Playing
- 1980–1993: Boston Celtics

Coaching
- 2005, 2008–2009: Minnesota Timberwolves
- 2011–2015: Houston Rockets

Career highlights
- 3× NBA champion (1981, 1984, 1986); 7× NBA All-Star (1984, 1986–1991); All-NBA First Team (1987); 3× NBA All-Defensive First Team (1986–1988); 3× NBA All-Defensive Second Team (1983, 1989, 1990); 2× NBA Sixth Man of the Year (1984, 1985); NBA All-Rookie First Team (1981); NBA anniversary team (50th, 75th); No. 32 retired by Boston Celtics; First-team All-Big Ten (1980); Second-team All-Big Ten (1979); No. 44 retired by Minnesota Golden Gophers; Minnesota Mr. Basketball (1976)

Career playing statistics
- Points: 17,335 (17.9 ppg)
- Rebounds: 7,122 (7.3 rpg)
- Blocks: 1,690 (1.7 bpg)
- Stats at NBA.com
- Stats at Basketball Reference

Career coaching record
- NBA: 232–185 (.556)
- Record at Basketball Reference
- Basketball Hall of Fame
- Collegiate Basketball Hall of Fame
Medals
Men's basketball
Representing the United States
Pan American Games
Gold medal – first place	1979 San Juan	Team competition
Universiade
Gold medal – first place	1979 Mexico City	Team competition

Kevin Edward McHale (born December 19, 1957) is an American former professional basketball player, coach and analyst who played his entire professional career for the Boston Celtics. He earned the nickname "the Torture Chamber" for his exceptional footwork and wide array of post moves which made him nearly impossible to guard one-on-one. Dominique Wilkins famously called him "A Man With a Thousand Moves." He is a Basketball Hall of Fame inductee and widely considered one of the greatest power forwards of all time.

After a high school career in which he was named Minnesota Mr. Basketball, he attended the University of Minnesota, where he was named to two first-team All Conference teams and set many team records that still stand today. He was then selected third overall in the 1980 NBA Draft by the Boston Celtics. Spending his first five seasons as the sixth man, he was named the NBA's Sixth Man of the Year in 1984 and 1985. After Cedric Maxwell was traded prior to the 1985–1986 season, McHale became a full-time starter alongside Larry Bird and center Robert Parish, where the three formed what is arguably the greatest frontcourt in NBA history. He won three NBA championships in 1981, 1984 and 1986. After earning his first All-Star selection as the Celtics’ sixth man, he went on to make six more All-Star teams as a starter for the Celtics, while also being named to six NBA All-Defensive Teams. After injuries forced his retirement following the 1992–1993 season, he was later named to both the NBA’s 50th and 75th Anniversary Teams.

McHale began working for the Minnesota Timberwolves immediately following his retirement in 1993 (until 2009) and at times as a TV analyst, general manager and head coach. He was head coach of the Houston Rockets from 2011 to 2015 until being fired following a 4–7 start to the 2015–16 season.

== Early life ==
McHale was born to Paul Austin McHale and Josephine Patricia Starcevic in Hibbing, Minnesota. In his senior season at Hibbing High School, he was named Minnesota Mr. Basketball in 1976 and led his team to a runner-up finish in the AA Minnesota State Championship game.

He is of Croatian descent on his mother's side and Irish on his father's.

== College career ==
The 6 ft 10 in (2.08 m) McHale played basketball at the power forward position for the University of Minnesota (the Golden Gophers) from 1976 to 1980, with career averages of 15.2 points and 8.5 rebounds per game.

He was named All-Big Ten in 1979 and 1980 and still ranks second in school history in career points (1704) and rebounds (950).

In 1995, to coincide with the University of Minnesota basketball's 100th anniversary, he was chosen as the top player in the history of University of Minnesota men's basketball.

McHale had an encounter with Chuck Foreman in the Gopher locker room. Foreman, a famous Minnesota Viking at the time, was congratulating the Gophers on a hard-fought victory. As Foreman was shaking all the players' hands, when he arrived at the then-unknown power forward, McHale displayed his comic wit: "Nice to meet you, Mr. Foreman. What do you do for a living?"

== NBA playing career ==
=== Coming off the bench, the "Sixth Man" (1980–1985) ===
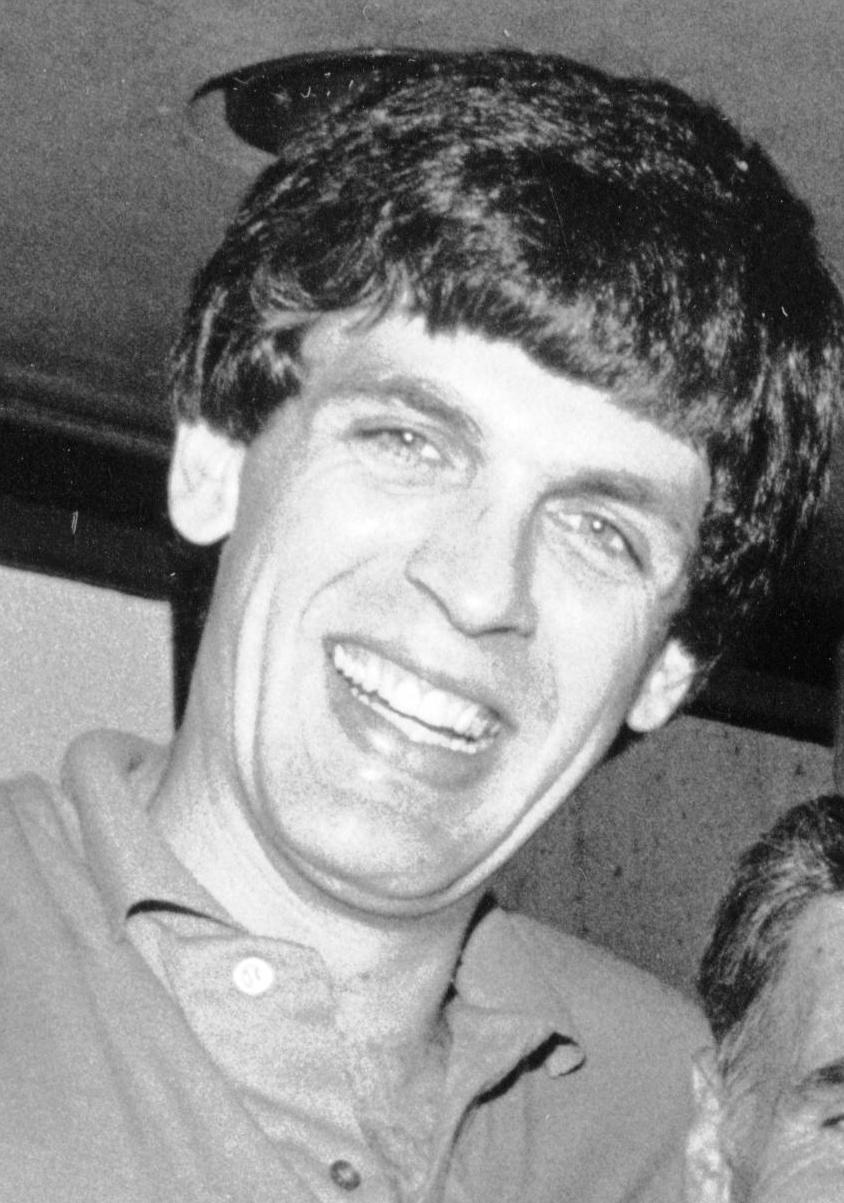
McHale c. 1985

Entering the 1980 NBA draft, the Celtics held the number one overall pick, but in a pre-draft trade, considered by many to be among the most lopsided in NBA history, Celtics president Red Auerbach dealt the pick and an additional first-round pick to the Golden State Warriors for center Robert Parish and the Warriors' first-round pick, the third overall, which the Celtics used to draft McHale. McHale's stay in Boston got off to a rocky start as he held out for a large contract, even threatening to play in Italy, before signing a three-year deal with the Celtics. Backing up Cedric Maxwell at forward, McHale made an immediate impact and was named to the NBA's All-Rookie First Team. Boston finished McHale's rookie season with a league-leading record of 62–20.

In the playoffs, the Celtics swept the Chicago Bulls in the first round. In the Eastern Conference finals, the Celtics faced a 3–1 deficit against the Philadelphia 76ers; but Boston won the last three games of the series, including Game 6 on Philadelphia's home court. McHale helped save the Game 6 win by rejecting an Andrew Toney shot and corralling the rebound with 16 seconds left to protect the Celtics' one-point lead. In the NBA Finals, Boston defeated the Houston Rockets in six games to capture the team's 14th championship.

The Celtics would not advance to the NBA Finals in the next two seasons. Philadelphia exacted a measure of revenge in the 1982 Eastern Conference final, beating Boston at home in the seventh game. In the 1983 Eastern Conference semifinals, the Celtics were swept by the Milwaukee Bucks. This embarrassing defeat led to the firing of head coach Bill Fitch and a temporarily unhappy McHale.

Following the 1982–83 season, McHale's contract with the Celtics expired, and the New York Knicks signed him to a contract offer sheet. Auerbach retaliated by signing three of New York's top free-agent players to offer sheets. The Knicks elected to re-sign their players and give up their pursuit of McHale. McHale eventually re-signed with Boston, his $1 million per season contract making him the fourth-highest paid player in the NBA.

McHale won the first of his consecutive NBA Sixth Man Awards as Boston won a league-best 62 games in the 1983–84 season. With the hiring of new head coach, former Celtic KC Jones and the acquisition of Phoenix Suns guard Dennis Johnson, Boston seemed primed to make yet another run at a 15th championship.

After surviving a seven-game semifinal battle with the Knicks, the Celtics avenged the previous season's playoff loss to Milwaukee in the Eastern Conference Finals. Boston would face the Los Angeles Lakers in the NBA Finals in a highly anticipated matchup.

In Game 4 of the finals, with the Celtics trailing in both the game and the series, McHale delivered a hard foul to Kurt Rambis as the Lakers' forward raced to the basket. The physical play touched off a bench-clearing scuffle. Boston came back to win the game in overtime and tie the series at two games apiece. They eventually prevailed in seven games to win the franchise's 15th championship.

McHale continued to come off the bench during the first half of the 1984–1985 season, but moved into a starting role in February 1985 after Cedric Maxwell suffered a knee injury. On March 3 versus the Detroit Pistons McHale enjoyed his greatest scoring night, setting the Celtics' single-game scoring record with 56 points. Two nights later McHale scored 42 points against the Knicks, the only other time in his career he topped 40 points in a game. The 98 points in consecutive games is still a Celtics' record. Nine days after McHale had scored 56 points, Larry Bird established a new Celtics' single-game scoring mark by pouring in 60 points versus the Atlanta Hawks.

Boston captured its second straight Eastern Conference title but was upended in the NBA Finals in six games by the rival Lakers. McHale led the Celtics in scoring (26.0) and rebounding (10.7) versus the Lakers, including an impressive outing in the series's sixth game, scoring 32 points and grabbing 16 rebounds in defeat.

=== As a full-time starter, the "Torture Chamber" (1985–1988) ===
"When I was healthy, I always felt I could score. When it went into what I called 'The torture chamber,' I knew it was in." Kevin McHale, speaking about his low post play during the peak of his career.

The 1985–1986 edition of the Boston Celtics won the franchise's 16th NBA championship and is considered one of the greatest teams in NBA history.

The Celtics acquired former NBA Most Valuable Player Bill Walton in a trade from the Los Angeles Clippers (formerly the San Diego Clippers) in September 1985, and added the 6 ft 11 in (211 cm) center to its already-formidable frontline. Boston sent Cedric Maxwell to the Clippers to complete the trade, clearing the way for McHale to move into a full-time starting role. McHale averaged better than 20 points per game for the first time in his career (21.3) and finished 13th in the NBA Most Valuable Player voting.

Kevin McHale shoots over Hakeem Olajuwon and Jim Petersen during the 1986 NBA Finals.

He joined starters Bird, Parish, Johnson and Danny Ainge as the Celtics steamrolled the NBA with a league-best 67–15 record. The team set a then-NBA record by finishing with an 82–18 win–loss record (including playoffs), breaking the record of 81 victories by the 1971–72 Lakers.

Boston also set the NBA mark for most home victories in one season, finishing 50–1 (including playoffs) in 48 games in the Boston Garden and three games in Hartford, Connecticut. The Portland Trail Blazers were the only team to beat Boston at home, winning 121–103 in Boston Garden on December 6, 1985. The Celtics did not lose again at home until more than a year later, when the Lakers beat them 117–110 on December 12, 1986.

Boston won 41 of its first 50 games, including two victories over the Lakers. In a rout of the Clippers on December 30, 1985, McHale set his single-game high in rebounds with 18 (a mark he tied against the Pistons in 1989).

An extremely durable player through the first five seasons of his career, McHale missed 14 games in early 1986 due to an injured Achilles tendon in his left ankle, but was healthy in time for the playoffs. Boston rolled through the Eastern Conference, winning 11 of 12 games versus Chicago, Atlanta and Milwaukee.

For the second time in five years, the Celtics faced Houston in the NBA Finals, and Boston won the championship in six games. McHale averaged 25.8 points per game in the finals to lead all scorers.

By his seventh pro season, McHale had rehearsed and refined his low-post moves and had become one of the NBA's most dominant offensive forces, out-leaping, out-spinning and outmaneuvering defender after defender in his "torture chamber". McHale was never better than in the 1986–1987 season, setting career highs in scoring (26.1) and rebounding (9.9). He also became the first player in NBA history to shoot 60 percent or better from the field (60.4%) and 80 percent or better from the free-throw line (83.6%) in the same season. McHale was named to the All-NBA First Team, was named the NBA's best defensive player by the league's coaches, and finished fourth in the Most Valuable Player voting behind Magic Johnson, Michael Jordan, and teammate Larry Bird.

In nine games from February 23 through March 13, 1987, McHale averaged 30.7 points and 10 rebounds per game while shooting 71.7 percent from the floor. During this stretch, McHale scored his season-high in points, 38 versus the Pistons on March 1.

In a win at Chicago on March 27, McHale broke the navicular bone in his right foot. He ignored doctors' advice that the injury could be career-threatening and continued to play. In the playoffs, a hobbled McHale averaged 39 minutes per game and connected on 58 percent of his shots as Boston again won the Eastern Conference title. Boston swept the Bulls in the first round for the second straight year and survived two epic but bruising seven-game series with the Bucks and Pistons. The battered and fatigued Celtics - with not only McHale, but also Parish (two sprained ankles), Ainge (leg injury) and Walton (broken foot) playing hurt - then lost to the Lakers in six games in the 1987 NBA Finals.

Off-season surgery on his injured right foot and ankle forced McHale to sit out the first month of the 1987–1988 season. He scored 22 points in 22 minutes of play in his return to the Celtics on December 1, 1987, versus Atlanta.

Teammate Danny Ainge once called McHale "The Black Hole of the low post", joking that when the basketball was passed inside to McHale it disappeared because he rarely passed it back out to the perimeter. But in a win over the Dallas Mavericks on April 3, 1988, McHale played the role of passer, distributing a career-high 10 assists.

The Celtics won 57 games and made their fifth straight appearance in the Eastern Conference Finals. McHale shot 60% from the field and averaged a career playoff-high 25.4 points per game as Boston defeated the Knicks in four games and the Hawks in a seven-game semi-final series. He averaged 26.8 points per game and shot 56.3% from the field, including a game-tying three-point shot in overtime of game two, but Boston fell to the Detroit Pistons in six games in the conference final. Head coach K. C. Jones retired at season's end, and the Celtics of the Bird-McHale-Parish era would never again advance past the conference semi-finals.

=== Injury and decline (1988–1993) ===
Injuries limited Bird to six games in 1988–89 and the Celtics slipped to 42–40. New head coach Jimmy Rodgers coaxed the team into the playoffs as the Eastern Conference's eighth and final seed behind the play of McHale, Parish and second-year guard Reggie Lewis.

The Celtics - without the injured Bird - faced the Pistons in the playoffs for the third straight year. Detroit held McHale to 19 points per game and less than 50 percent shooting from the field. The Pistons swept the Celtics en route to their first NBA championship.

The 1989–90 season marked the last time McHale was healthy enough to play in all 82 regular-season games for the Celtics, but the season was one of discontent for Boston. Second-year point guard Brian Shaw left the team to play in Europe after a salary dispute. Bird returned to the court following his various injuries but was criticized by teammates, including McHale, for taking too many shots and trying to dominate games on his own.

Rodgers moved McHale back into his old "sixth man" role for the majority of the regular season, with Ed Pinckney taking McHale's spot in the starting lineup; McHale's scoring slipped back into the teens coming off the bench. With the Celtics 34–25, Rodgers decided to put McHale into the starting lineup once again. McHale averaged 24.2 points and 9 rebounds down the stretch as the Celtics went 18–5 and finished one game behind Philadelphia in the Atlantic Division.

McHale became the first player in 20 years to finish in the NBA's top ten in field goal percentage (seventh) and free throw percentage (fifth) in the same season.

Boston took the first two games of its first-round playoff series with the Knicks, including a record-setting 157–128 score in Game 2. The Knicks fought back and won the last three games of the series. Head coach Jimmy Rodgers was fired following the playoff disappointment.

McHale contemplated retirement in the off-season after having another surgery performed on his right ankle, but came back for the 1990–91 season. Boston paired young backcourt players Lewis, Dee Brown, Kevin Gamble and Brian Shaw—back from his year in Europe—with Bird, McHale and Parish and hired Chris Ford, a longtime assistant coach and member of the Celtics' 1981 championship team, to be the team's head coach.

Boston jumped out to a 29–5 record, but were soon slowed by injuries to McHale (ankle) and Bird (back). McHale missed 14 regular-season games and Bird missed 22, as the Celtics limped to a 27–21 record over the last three months of the season. The team's 56–26 record was still good enough to win the division title. Boston defeated the Indiana Pacers in five games in a first-round playoff matchup. Detroit defeated Boston for the third time in four years, this time in a six-game semi-final series.

McHale played in a career-low 56 games and Bird played in just 45 in 1991–92 season. Boston struggled for most of the regular season but got hot as the playoffs approached, winning 15 of its last 16 games and finishing with 51 wins and a tie for first place in the division with the New York Knicks. Boston had the tie-breaker to give them another Atlantic Division crown; their record was the third-best in the Eastern Conference.

The Celtics swept the Pacers in the first round but were defeated in seven games in the conference semi-finals by the Cleveland Cavaliers. Bird retired from the NBA three months later.

The 1992–93 season was McHale's last in the NBA. McHale played in 71 games, but he was severely hampered by leg and back injuries. He averaged 10.7 points per game and shot less than 50 percent from the floor (45.9%) for the only time in his career. McHale briefly feuded with coach and best friend Chris Ford over his lack of playing time near the end of his final season.

In the first round of the NBA playoffs against the Charlotte Hornets the Celtics were stunned by the loss of Lewis, their leading scorer, who collapsed on the court during Game 1 and was diagnosed with what eventually proved to be a fatal heart condition. McHale performed brilliantly in the series. He averaged 19.6 points per game and shot 58 percent from the field—including a reminiscent performance of 30 points and 10 rebounds in Game 2—but Boston fell to the Hornets in four games.

McHale announced his retirement while talking with reporters at the scorer's table after the Game 4 loss in Charlotte.

=== Legacy ===
McHale was a part of what many consider the league's best-ever frontline with small forward Larry Bird and center Robert Parish. The trio of Hall of Famers became known as the "Big Three" and led the Celtics to five NBA Finals appearances and three NBA championships, in 1981, 1984 and 1986. For the first five years of his career McHale primarily came off the bench for the Celtics, winning the NBA Sixth Man of the Year Award in 1984 and 1985.

Possessing a wide variety of offensive moves close to the basket the agile, long-armed McHale played in seven National Basketball Association All-Star Games between 1984 and 1991. McHale's finest season came in 1986–87 when he was named to the All-NBA First Team as a forward. He led the NBA in field goal percentage in the 1986-87 and 1987-88 seasons, shooting 60.4 percent each season. Also a standout defensive player, McHale was selected to the NBA All-Defensive First or Second Team six times. He twice blocked nine shots in a game, the most ever by a Boston Celtics player (blocked shots did not become an official NBA statistic until the 1973-74 season).

Fellow NBA Hall of Famer Charles Barkley said of McHale, "Kevin McHale's the best player I played against because he was unstoppable offensively, and he gave me nightmares on defense."

In 971 regular season games McHale averaged 17.9 points and 7.3 rebounds and in 169 post-season games averaged 18.8 points and 7.4 rebounds.

At the end of the 2007–2008 season McHale ranked tenth in NBA history in career field goal percentage (55.4%), and he is among the Celtics' career leaders in several categories, including games played, points scored and rebounding.

McHale's number 32 jersey was retired by the Celtics on January 30, 1994, during a halftime ceremony at the Boston Garden.

In 1995 he was inducted into the University of Minnesota Hall of Fame.

He was chosen one of the NBA's 50 greatest players and was named to the NBA's 50th Anniversary All-Time Team in 1996.

In 1992, McHale was elected to the Minnesota State High School League Hall of Fame. He was elected to the Naismith Basketball Hall of Fame in 1999.

In 2020 McHale was inducted into the Minnesota sports Hall of Fame.

In 2021, McHale was honored as one of the league's greatest players of all time by being named to the NBA's 75th Anniversary Team. To commemorate the NBA's 75th Anniversary The Athletic ranked their top 75 players of all time, and named McHale as the 49th greatest player in NBA history.

In October 2022, he was inaugurated in the Croatian-American Sports Hall of Fame. In 2025 he was inducted into the Irish-American Hall of Fame via the sports wing.

== NBA career statistics ==
Legend
GP	Games played	GS	Games started	MPG	Minutes per game
FG%	Field goal percentage	3P%	3-point field goal percentage	FT%	Free throw percentage
RPG	Rebounds per game	APG	Assists per game	SPG	Steals per game
BPG	Blocks per game	PPG	Points per game	**Bold**	Career high
†	Won an NBA championship	*	Led the league

=== Regular season ===
Year	Team	GP	GS	MPG	FG%	3P%	FT%	RPG	APG	SPG	BPG	PPG
1980–81†	Boston	**82**	1	20.1	.533	.000	.679	4.4	0.7	0.3	1.8	10.0
1981–82	Boston	**82**	33	28.4	.531	.000	.754	6.8	1.1	0.4	2.3	13.6
1982–83	Boston	**82**	13	28.6	.541	.000	.717	6.7	1.3	0.4	2.3	14.1
1983–84†	Boston	**82***	10	31.4	.556	.333	.765	7.4	1.3	0.3	1.5	18.4
1984–85	Boston	79	31	33.6	.570	.000	.760	9.0	1.8	0.4	1.5	19.8
1985–86†	Boston	68	62	35.3	.574	.000	.776	8.1	**2.7**	0.4	**2.8**	21.3
1986–87	Boston	77	**77**	**39.7**	**.604***	.000	.836	**9.9**	2.6	**0.5**	2.2	**26.1**
1987–88	Boston	64	63	37.3	**.604***	.000	.797	8.4	**2.7**	0.4	1.4	22.6
1988–89	Boston	78	74	36.9	.546	.000	.818	8.2	2.2	0.3	1.2	22.5
1989–90	Boston	**82***	25	33.2	.549	.333	**.893**	8.3	2.1	0.4	1.9	20.9
1990–91	Boston	68	10	30.4	.553	**.405**	.829	7.1	1.9	0.4	2.1	18.4
1991–92	Boston	56	1	30.4	.509	.000	.822	5.9	1.5	0.2	1.1	13.9
1992–93	Boston	71	0	30.4	.459	.111	.841	5.0	1.0	0.2	0.8	10.7
Career		971	400	31.0	.554	.261	.798	7.3	1.7	0.4	1.7	17.9
All-Star		7	0	17.9	.500	.500	.857	5.3	1.1	0.1	1.7	8.7

=== Playoffs ===
Year	Team	GP	GS	MPG	FG%	3P%	FT%	RPG	APG	SPG	BPG	PPG
1981†	Boston	17	0	17.4	.540	.000	.639	3.5	0.8	0.2	1.5	8.5
1982	Boston	12	0	28.7	.575	.000	.755	7.1	0.9	0.4	2.3	16.2
1983	Boston	7	1	25.3	.548	.000	.556	6.0	0.7	0.4	1.0	11.1
1984†	Boston	**23**	0	30.5	.504	.000	.777	6.2	1.2	0.1	1.5	14.8
1985	Boston	21	**21**	39.9	.568	.000	.807	**9.9**	1.5	**0.6**	2.2	22.1
1986†	Boston	18	18	39.7	.579	.000	.794	8.6	2.7	0.4	**2.4**	24.9
1987	Boston	21	19	39.4	.584	.000	.762	9.2	1.9	0.3	1.4	21.1
1988	Boston	17	17	**42.1**	.603	**1.000**	.839	8.0	2.4	0.4	1.8	**25.4**
1989	Boston	3	3	38.3	.488	.000	.739	8.0	**3.0**	0.3	0.7	19.0
1990	Boston	5	5	38.4	**.609**	.333	**.862**	7.8	2.6	0.4	2.0	22.0
1991	Boston	11	1	34.2	.527	.545	.825	3.5	1.8	0.5	1.3	20.7
1992	Boston	10	0	30.6	.516	.000	.795	7.1	1.3	0.5	0.5	16.5
1993	Boston	4	0	28.3	.582	.000	.857	7.1	0.8	0.5	1.8	19.0
Career		169	85	33.8	.561	.381	.788	7.4	1.6	0.4	1.7	18.8

== Career after retirement ==
=== Front office work with Minnesota Timberwolves ===
Upon his retirement as an NBA player, McHale joined the Minnesota Timberwolves as a television analyst and "special assistant". In the summer of 1994, new Timberwolves owner Glen Taylor promoted him to Assistant General Manager, although he continued to broadcast Timberwolves games as well. In 1995, he was promoted to Vice President of Basketball Operations (i.e., General Manager); one of his first acts was hiring former University of Minnesota teammate Flip Saunders as head coach of the Timberwolves.

The next season, McHale decided to select high school forward Kevin Garnett with the fifth overall pick of the 1995 NBA draft. Though Garnett developed into one of the NBA's best players, the Timberwolves advanced past the first round of the playoffs only once in Garnett's 12 seasons with the team.

It was also during McHale's reign that the Timberwolves were punished by the NBA for making a secret deal with free-agent forward Joe Smith to circumvent the league's salary cap rules. Before the 1998–99 season, Smith secretly agreed to sign three, one-year contracts with the Timberwolves for salary amounts that were much less than what any other NBA teams would have reasonably offered him. In return, Smith received a promise that the Timberwolves would give him a multi-year, multimillion-dollar contract before the 2001–02 season.

In 2000, after word of the agreement leaked, NBA commissioner David Stern voided Smith's final one-year contract with the Timberwolves, making Smith a free agent. Stern also stripped three of the Timberwolves' next five first-round draft picks from the team, and fined the team $3.5 million. In addition, McHale served a suspension that lasted through July 2001. Smith signed with the Detroit Pistons for one season, but returned to Minnesota before the 2001–2002 season as a free agent.

On February 12, 2005, the Timberwolves fired Saunders and McHale took over as head coach for the rest of the 2004–05 season. He compiled a 19–12 record, but had no interest in continuing as head coach at the time. Dwane Casey was hired as the new head coach in the off-season.

With Minnesota sitting at .500 midway through the 2006–07 season, McHale fired Casey on January 23, 2007. Timberwolves' assistant coach Randy Wittman was tapped to succeed Casey. Despite missing the playoffs, on April 19, 2007, the Timberwolves announced that McHale and Wittman would return for the 2007–08 season.

Prior to the 2007 NBA draft, McHale reportedly tried to work out a trade with Boston Celtics General Manager (and former Celtics teammate) Danny Ainge to trade franchise star Kevin Garnett (frequently named, at the time, the best active player to have never won an NBA championship) to Boston, in exchange for a draft pick and multiple players. Garnett's agent told the Timberwolves and the Celtics that his client had no interest in playing for Boston. (Although Boston had a legitimate star in Paul Pierce, and some solid young players, the team was coming off a 24-win season, and Garnett was not interested in going from one mediocre team to another.) The potential trade was scuttled, for the time being. However, in late June the Celtics swung a draft-day deal with the Seattle SuperSonics to acquire sharpshooter and seven-time All-Star Ray Allen. So in late July 2007, when the Timberwolves and the Celtics once again discussed a deal involving Garnett, the prospect of playing alongside both Pierce and Allen caused Garnett to ease his stance on being dealt to Boston; on July 31 he was sent to the Celtics for five players and two first-round draft picks, and the Celtics instantly became viewed as contenders. The very next season, Garnett would go on to help the Celtics win the NBA championship, was named NBA Defensive Player of the Year, and finished third in the voting for the regular-season version of the league's Most Valuable Player award. (Although one of McHale's key acquisitions in the trade – promising power-forward Al Jefferson – would come very close to matching Garnett's statistics from the previous year, and Ryan Gomes (another player acquired in the trade) performed well, the rebuilding team won 10 fewer games its first season without Garnett.) The Timberwolves eventually fired McHale by the end of the 2008–09 season.

=== Coaching ===
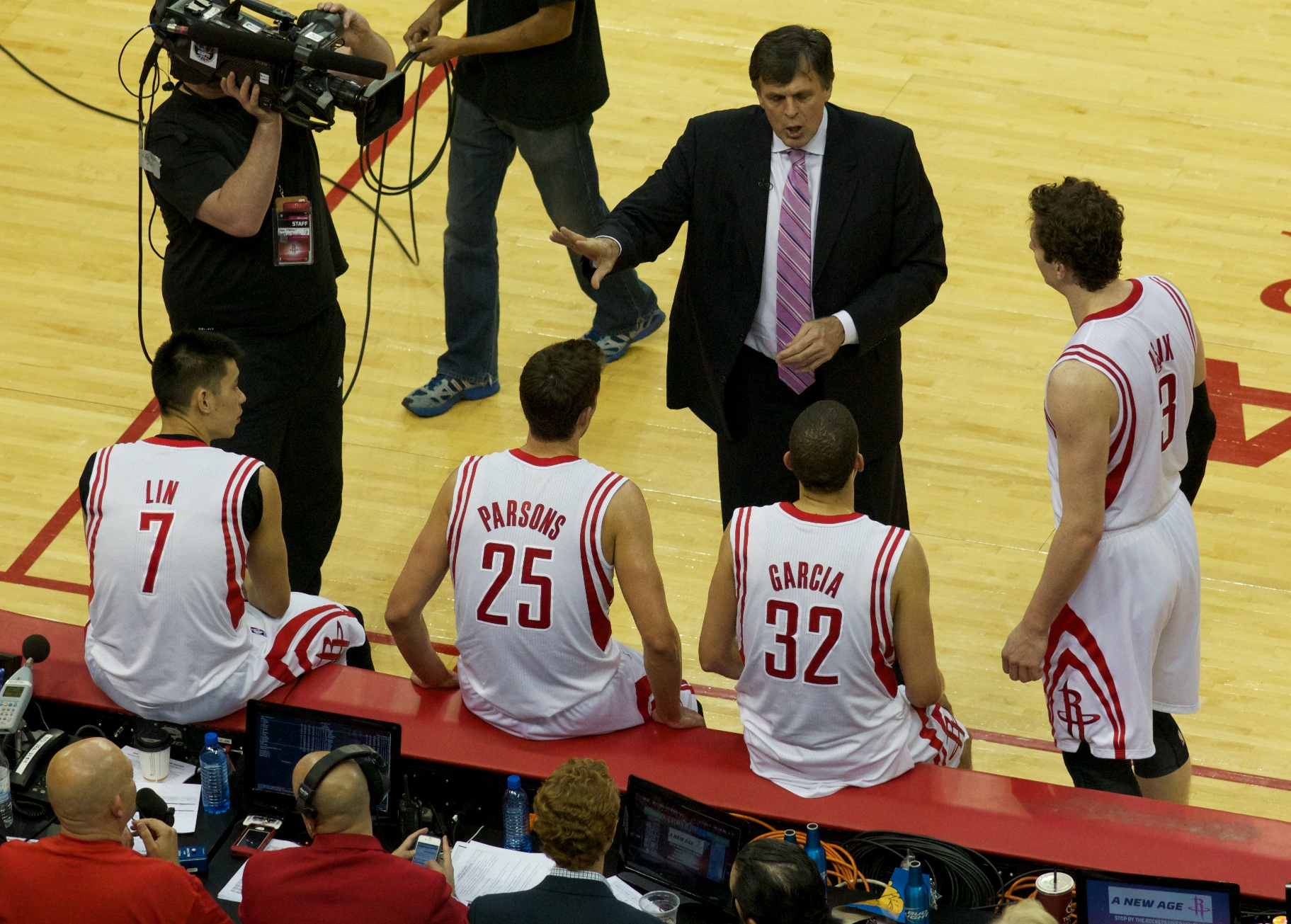
McHale, Jeremy Lin, Chandler Parsons, Francisco García, and Ömer Aşık during game 6 of the first round of the 2013 playoffs

On December 8, 2008, the Timberwolves fired Wittman. He had compiled a 38–105 record since taking over for Casey. The Timberwolves announced that McHale would step down as VP of Basketball Operations and once again take over the head coaching job, this time more permanently; the Timberwolves' owner Glen Taylor at the time indicated that he was not seeking to replace McHale as head coach. On June 17, 2009, however, it was announced that McHale would not return as the Timberwolves' head coach for the 2009–2010 season, and he was later replaced by Kurt Rambis, whom McHale infamously clotheslined in Game 4 of the 1984 NBA Finals.

On June 1, 2011, McHale was named head coach of the Houston Rockets, replacing Rick Adelman. On December 24, 2014, McHale signed a three-year contract extension to remain head coach of the Rockets. He led the Rockets to the Western Conference finals in 2015. However, he was fired on November 18, 2015, after four consecutive losses and a 4–7 start to the 2015–16 season.

McHale is one of six members of the 1985–86 Celtics' championship team to have served as an NBA head coach (Larry Bird, Danny Ainge, Dennis Johnson, Sam Vincent and Rick Carlisle are the others).

=== TV analyst ===
Immediately upon retiring, McHale became the color analyst for Minnesota Timberwolves games for two seasons, from 1993 to 1995. McHale began working for TNT and NBA TV as an on-air, floor-side analyst during the 2009–2010 regular season. He occasionally appeared on the NBA on TNT in-studio show, and even broadcast a few regular season and playoff games for the cable station. During the 2016 NBA Playoffs, McHale served as a guest analyst for the NBA on TNT's coverage. On October 10, 2016, he signed a multi-year agreement to return to Turner Sports.

McHale was also a part of the studio team for NBA TV's Fan Night broadcasts on Tuesday nights during the season (along with Ernie Johnson, Chris Webber and Greg Anthony since the 2016–17 season). McHale also called games for the station during the 2010 Las Vegas Summer League.

== Personal life ==
On June 26, 1982, McHale married his wife Lynn. They had five children: Kristyn, Michael, Joseph, Alexandra, and Thomas. On November 24, 2012, Alexandra died at age 23, after being hospitalized for lupus for 14 days.

McHale enjoys playing golf and has competed in charity tournaments, also being involved in other local charity events, and was a board member and spokes person for the Help Me Hear Foundation which was created to gift cochlear implants to impoverished deaf children who would otherwise never be able to obtain one.

McHale guest-starred as himself in two episodes of the TV series Cheers: "Cheers Fouls Out" (season 9, episode 2) in 1990 and "Where Have All the Floorboards Gone" (season 10, episode 8) in 1991. The latter episode also featured Lynn McHale.

== Head coaching record ==
Legend
Regular season	G	Games coached	W	Games won	L	Games lost	W–L %	Win–loss %
Playoffs	PG	Playoff games	PW	Playoff wins	PL	Playoff losses	PW–L %	Playoff win–loss %

Team	Year	G	W	L	W–L%	Finish	PG	PW	PL	PW–L%	Result
Minnesota	2004–05	31	19	12	.613	3rd in Northwest	—	—	—	—	Missed Playoffs
Minnesota	2008–09	63	20	43	.317	4th in Northwest	—	—	—	—	Missed Playoffs
Houston	2011–12	66	34	32	.515	4th in Southwest	—	—	—	—	Missed Playoffs
Houston	2012–13	82	45	37	.549	3rd in Southwest	6	2	4	.333	Lost in First Round
Houston	2013–14	82	54	28	.659	2nd in Southwest	6	2	4	.333	Lost in First Round
Houston	2014–15	82	56	26	.683	1st in Southwest	17	9	8	.529	Lost in Conf. Finals
Houston	2015–16	11	4	7	.364	(fired)	—	—	—	—	
Career		417	232	185	.556		29	13	16	.448	

== Career highlights and awards ==
=== NBA ===
- NBA champion: 1981, 1984, 1986
- NBA All-Star: 1984, 1986, 1987, 1988, 1989, 1990, 1991
- All-NBA First Team: 1987
- NBA All-Defensive First Team: 1986, 1987, 1988
- NBA All-Defensive Second Team: 1983, 1989, 1990
- NBA Sixth Man of the Year: 1984, 1985
- NBA All-Rookie First Team: 1981
- 2× NBA field goal percentage leader (1987, 1988)
- First player in NBA history to shoot 60 percent from the field and 80 percent from the foul line in the same season (1986-87)
- No. 32 retired by Boston Celtics: 1994
- 50th Anniversary Team: 1996
- 75th Anniversary Team: 2021

=== College ===
- Second-team All-Big Ten: 1979
- First-team All-Big Ten: 1980
- No. 44 retired by Minnesota Golden Gophers: 1993
- Selected as the top player in the history of University of Minnesota men's basketball: 1995

=== USA Basketball ===
- 1979 Pan American Games: gold medal
- 1979 FISU World University Games: gold medal

=== Halls of Fame ===
- Minnesota State High School League Hall of Fame: 1992
- University of Minnesota Hall of Fame: 1995
- Hibbing High School Athletic Hall of Fame: 1997
- Naismith Basketball Hall of Fame: 1999
- National High School Hall of Fame: 2000
- Minnesota Basketball Hall of Fame: 2018
- Minnesota sports Hall of Fame: 2020
- Croatian-American Sports Hall of Fame: 2022
- Irish-American Hall of Fame: 2025

=== Other ===
- Minnesota Mr. Basketball':' 1976
- Basketball Legacy Award from The Sports Museum at TD Garden: 2021

== See also ==
- List of NBA career blocks leaders
- List of NBA career field goal percentage leaders
- List of NBA career playoff scoring leaders
- List of NBA career playoff blocks leaders
- List of NBA career playoff free throw scoring leaders
- List of NBA players who have spent their entire career with one franchise
