= Rick Rickert =

American basketball player (born 1983)

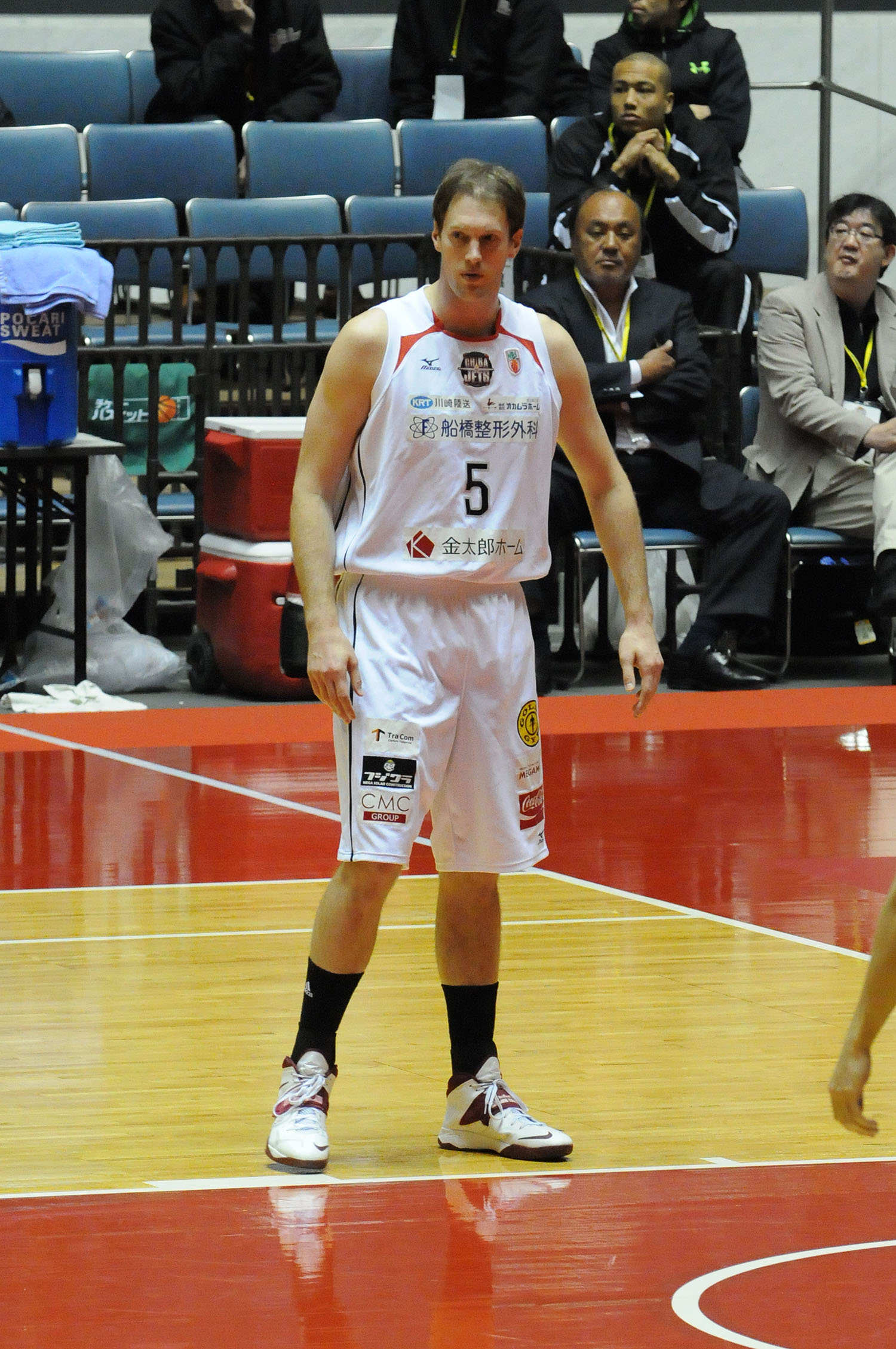

Personal information
- Born: February 11, 1983 (age 43) Duluth, Minnesota, U.S.
- Listed height: 6 ft 11 in (2.11 m)
- Listed weight: 235 lb (107 kg)

Career information
- High school: East (Duluth, Minnesota)
- College: Minnesota (2001–2003)
- NBA draft: 2003: 2nd round, 55th overall pick
- Drafted by: Minnesota Timberwolves
- Playing career: 2003–2018
- Position: Power forward / center
- Number: 5

Career history
- 2003–2004: Krka Novo Mesto
- 2004–2005: Asheville Altitude
- 2005: Panellinios
- 2005: Lleida Bàsquet
- 2006: Fayetteville Patriots
- 2006–2007: Colorado 14ers
- 2007–2010: New Zealand Breakers
- 2010: Harbour Heat
- 2010–2011: EnBW Ludwigsburg
- 2011: Vaqueros de Bayamón
- 2011–2012: Kyoto Hannaryz
- 2012–2013: Osaka Evessa
- 2013: Wellington Saints
- 2013–2014: Wakayama Trians
- 2014–2016: Chiba Jets
- 2016–2018: Cyberdyne Ibaraki Robots

Career highlights
- No. 44 retired by Duluth East; NBA D-League All-Star (2007); Slovenian League All-Star (2004); First-team All-Big Ten (2003); Second-team All-Big Ten (2002); Big Ten Freshman of the Year (2002); First-team Parade All-American (2001); Minnesota Mr. Basketball (2001); McDonald's All-American (2001)
- Stats at Basketball Reference

Rick Rickert (born February 11, 1983) is an American former professional basketball player. He is a 2001 graduate of Duluth East High School where he was a basketball star and highly recruited college prospect. He was named 2001 Minnesota Mr. Basketball.

== Career ==
Rickert played collegiately for the University of Minnesota, where after averaging 15 points and 5 rebounds per game in 2001–02 he became the first Gopher player ever to win the Big Ten Freshman of the Year award. After averaging 16 points and 6 rebounds his sophomore season Rickert declared for the 2003 NBA draft.

Rickert was drafted 55th overall (26th in the second round) by the Minnesota Timberwolves. Rickert failed to make the team and went to play in Slovenia for Novo Mesto. Rickert has played with: Krka Novo Mesto (Adriatic League/Euroleague), Minnesota Timberwolves (NBA - preseason only), Asheville Altitude (D-League), Panellinios B.C. Athens (Greece), Lleida Bàsquet (Spain - 2nd Division), Fayetteville Patriots (D-League), Detroit Pistons (NBA - preseason only), Colorado 14ers (D-League), the D-League All Star Team that traveled to China, representing the U.S. in the world tournament (D-League), and the New Zealand Breakers (Australasian National Basketball League).

Kevin Garnett punched Rickert during a 2004 pick-up game, leading to stitches and a chipped tooth.

In 2007, Rickert signed to play with the New Zealand Breakers in the Australasian NBL. In June 2008, he re-signed with the New Zealand Breakers. In the 2008–09 season, he averaged 13.6 points and 8.1 rebounds. He played 73 game overall for the Breakers. Rick played for the Harbour Heat during the 2010 New Zealand NBL season.

After Rickert played in the Australian League with the NZ Breakers for 3 seasons, his career took him back to Europe playing for ENBW Ludwigsburg in Germany's BEKO BBL top league. During this season, Rickert broke his nose and cheek during a game going up for a rebound leading to months wearing a face mask during practice and games.

In 2011, Rickert played in Puerto Rico for the Bayamon Vaqueros in the Baloncesto Superior Nacional (BSN). Rickert was a leading scorer and rebounder in this league.

In 2011, Rickert signed with Kyoto, Hannaryz in Japan. His impact in Japan as a player and person was successful and welcomed leading to 7 seasons playing for top teams in Japan's professional leagues. Rickert is one of the few players who have played in all of the Japanese professional leagues. He played in both of the top leagues called The BJ League and The NBL League, as well as the recently developed professional league which combined both leagues, now named the B League. During Rickert's basketball career in Japan, he played for Kyoto Hannaryz, Osaka Evessa, Wakayama Trians, Chiba Jets, and Ibraki Robots.

After Rickert finished his season with Osaka Evessa, he was signed to play for the Wellington Saints. On 6 June 2013, the Wellington Saints signed Rickert for the rest of the 2013 season.

In 2018, Rickert retired after 15 professional basketball seasons.
