= Tom Copa =

American basketball player (born 1964)

Personal information
- Born: October 30, 1964 (age 62) Robbinsdale, Minnesota, U.S.
- Listed height: 6 ft 10 in (2.08 m)
- Listed weight: 275 lb (125 kg)

Career information
- High school: Coon Rapids (Coon Rapids, Minnesota)
- College: Marquette (1983–1987)
- NBA draft: 1987: undrafted
- Playing career: 1988–1993
- Position: Center
- Number: 30

Career history
- 1988–1991: Maccabi Brussels
- 1991–1992: San Antonio Spurs
- 1992–1993: La Crosse Bobcats
- 1993: Saski Baskonia
- 1993: Libertas Livorno

Career highlights
- Minnesota Mr. Basketball (1983)
- Stats at NBA.com
- Stats at Basketball Reference
Medals
Men's basketball
Representing United States
FIBA Americas Championship
Gold medal – first place	1993 San Juan	Team competition

Thomas James Copa (born October 30, 1964) is an American former professional basketball player. After graduating from Marquette he went on to play professionally in the National Basketball Association (NBA) and in Europe. Born in Robbinsdale, Minnesota, he was named Minnesota Mr. Basketball in 1983.

== College career ==
Copa played college basketball for Marquette Warriors from 1983 to 1987. In 120 career games, he averaged 8.2 points and 4.7 rebounds per game.

== Professional career ==
Although chosen with the 44th pick in the 1987 CBA draft, Copa moved to Vail, Colorado after graduating where he worked as a shuttle-bus driver from the Stapleton Airport to Vail for the winter. The following summer, he attended a camp for European scouts where he had a good showing and was eventually signed by Belgian club Maccabi Brussels. He spent three seasons in Belgium, including the 1990–91 season where he averaged 21.2 points and 14.4 rebounds. During the summer of 1991, he attended a rookie free agent camp in Austin ran by the San Antonio Spurs. The Spurs later signed him as a free agent. During the 1991-92 NBA season, Copa averaged 1.5 points and 1.1 rebounds in 33 total games played.

The following season, he signed with the Houston Rockets but was waived before the start of the season. He later signed with the La Crosse Bobcats in the CBA where he went on to average 8.3 points and 6.7 rebounds in 20 games. In January 1993, he signed with Saski Baskonia. The following season he signed with Italian club Libertas Livorno but was waived after one game. Following his release and due to the toll his playing career had taken on his body, Copa retired from professional basketball.
