= Kevin Lynch (basketball) =

American basketball player (born 1968)

Personal information
- Born: December 24, 1968 (age 57) Bloomington, Minnesota, U.S.
- Listed height: 6 ft 5 in (1.96 m)
- Listed weight: 195 lb (88 kg)

Career information
- High school: Bloomington Jefferson (Bloomington, Minnesota)
- College: Minnesota (1987–1991)
- NBA draft: 1991: 2nd round, 28th overall pick
- Drafted by: Charlotte Hornets
- Playing career: 1991–2000
- Position: Shooting guard / small forward
- Number: 9

Career history
- 1991–1993: Charlotte Hornets
- 1993–1994: La Crosse Catbirds
- 1994: Fargo-Moorhead Fever
- 1994: Tau Cerámica
- 1995: Pamesa Valencia
- 1995–1996: Gießen 46ers
- 1997–2000: Brose Baskets

Career highlights
- Minnesota Mr. Basketball (1987)
- Stats at NBA.com
- Stats at Basketball Reference

Kevin Joseph Lynch (born December 24, 1968) is an American former professional basketball player who played two seasons in the National Basketball Association (NBA) and six seasons in Europe (Spain and Germany).

== Basketball career ==
Lynch played at Bloomington Jefferson High School, leading the Jaguars to two state championships in 1986 and 1987. After leading Bloomington Jefferson to an undefeated season, Lynch won both the Minnesota Mr. Basketball and Metro Player of the Year in 1987. He then became a part of the first recruiting class put together by then University of Minnesota coach Clem Haskins.

During the 1988–89 season, Lynch teamed with forward Willie Burton and center Richard Coffey to lead the Gophers to the NCAA Tournament Sweet Sixteen (losing to Duke) and during the 1989–1990 season, to a 20–7 record, a national ranking as high as No 17, and despite being up by twelve points at halftime, suffered a two-point loss in the Elite Eight to Georgia Tech. Lynch scored 1355 points in his four seasons with the Gophers, 11th all-time at the university. During his senior season, Kevin averaged 18.1 points per game and was named to the All Big Ten team.

Following the season, Lynch was drafted by the Charlotte Hornets with the 1st pick in the 2nd round (28th overall) of the 1991 NBA draft. After two seasons with Charlotte, where he averaged 3.3 points and 12 minutes per game, Kevin continued his professional career overseas, playing two years in Spain and four in Germany, where he played for MTV 1846 Giessen Flippers.

After retirement from professional basketball, Lynch returned to Minnesota to finish his college degree. He later was on the Gopher Basketball radio broadcast team for seven years. Lynch now does radio broadcasts for the Minnesota Timberwolves on KFAN-AM 1130.

== Broadcast career ==
After retiring from professional basketball in 2000, Lynch returned to Minnesota and completed his degree in history (with an emphasis in Modern European History) in 2001. Lynch was then hired as a men's basketball radio analyst for the Golden Gophers in 2001, taking the place of long-time Gopher radioman Ray Christensen. Later he was hired to call games for the NBA's Minnesota Timberwolves.
