= Coon Rapids High School =

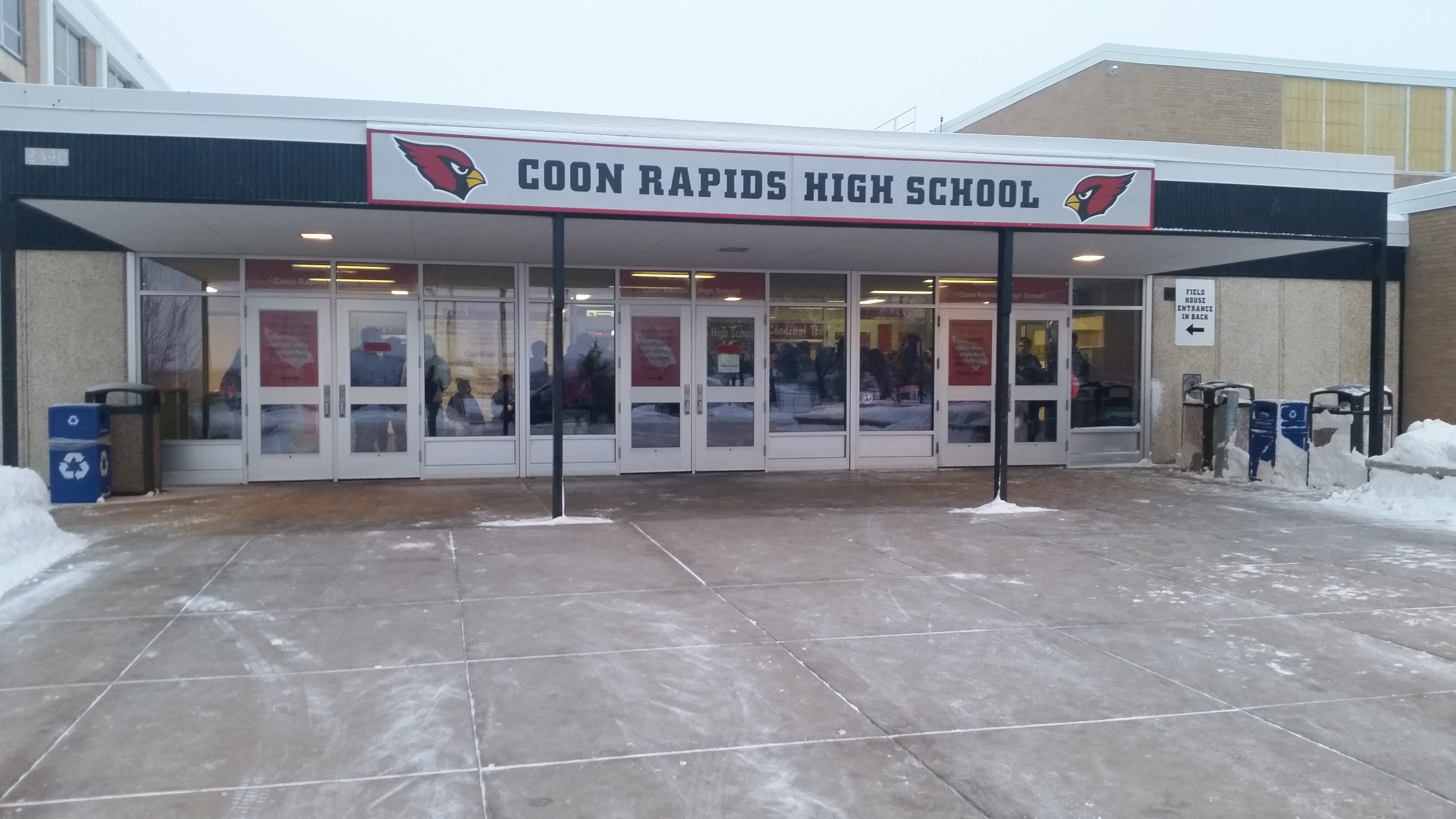
- Front of school, 2015

Location
- 2340 Northdale Boulevard Northwest; Coon Rapids, Minnesota 55433; United States
- 45.182°N 93.326°W

Information
- Type: Public high school
- Motto: Respect. Learn. Achieve. Celebrate.
- Established: 1963
- School district: Anoka-Hennepin School District 11
- NCES School ID: 270318000100
- Principal: John Peña
- Teaching staff: 115.72 (on an FTE basis)
- Grades: 9–12
- Enrollment: 2,147 (2023-2024)
- Student to teacher ratio: 18.55
- Colors: Red and white
- Athletics conference: Northwest Suburban Conference
- Nickname: Cardinals
- Website: www.ahschools.us/crhs

Coon Rapids High School (CRHS) is a public high school in Coon Rapids, Minnesota, United States. It is part of the Anoka-Hennepin School District 11 and participates in the University of Minnesota's College in the Schools program. It was established in 1963.

== Academics ==
The Coon Rapids Center for Biomedical Sciences and Engineering program is a specialty program within the school. The program was launched in 2013 and consists of hands-on math, science, medical, and engineering courses using Project Lead the Way curriculum.

Students can enroll in college-level courses through Post Secondary Enrollment Options (PSEO). This program allows high school students to experience college coursework without paying college tuition fees. General education coursework is available to grades 11 and 12, and technical education coursework is available to grades 10, 11, and 12.

== Athletics ==
Coon Rapids High School is part of the Northwest Suburban Conference and a member of the Minnesota State High School League (MSHSL).

== Notable alumni ==
- Tom Copa, professional basketball player
- Branden Petersen, politician
- Logan Shore, MLB player
- Zack Stephenson, politician and state representative
- Semhar Araia, international rights lawyer
- Kristofer Helgen, zoologist
- Anthony Cox, jazz musician
- Chief Justice, Meteorologist
