= East High School (Minnesota) =

Duluth East High School

Location
- 301 North 40th Avenue East; Duluth, Minnesota 55804; United States; 46°49′04″N 92°03′53″W

Information
- Type: Public
- Motto: Home Of The Greyhounds
- Established: 1927
- NCES School ID: 271104000461
- Principal: Kelly Flohaug
- Enrollment: 1,486 (2023–2024)
- Student to teacher ratio: 22.74
- Colors: Red and grey
- Song: The Birchen
- Mascot: Greyhounds
- Website: dulutheast.isd709.org/about-us

East High School is a public secondary school in Duluth, Minnesota, United States. It educates students in grades nine through twelve. It opened in 1927 as a junior high school. In 1950, it became a senior high school to serve the growing student population.

As part of the Duluth Public Schools "Red Plan," East High School was moved into the renovated and expanded Ordean Middle School building in 2011. Ordean East Middle School was moved into the former East High School building at 2900 East Fourth Street.

== Notable alumni ==
- Scott D. Anderson, author and aviator
- Philip Beaulieu, professional hockey player
- Derek Forbort, professional hockey player
- Kara Goucher, long distance runner
- William Melchert-Dinkel, nurse convicted of encouraging two suicides
- Thomas R. Nides, banker and government official
- Rick Rickert, professional basketball player
- Dominic Toninato, professional hockey player
- Michael Usan, circuit court judge
- Phil Verchota, professional hockey player
