= Sam Jacobson =

American basketball player (born 1975)

Personal information
- Born: July 22, 1975 (age 51) Cottage Grove, Minnesota, U.S.
- Listed height: 6 ft 4 in (1.93 m)
- Listed weight: 215 lb (98 kg)

Career information
- High school: Park (Cottage Grove, Minnesota)
- College: Minnesota (1994–1998)
- NBA draft: 1998: 1st round, 26th overall pick
- Drafted by: Los Angeles Lakers
- Playing career: 1998–2007
- Position: Shooting guard
- Number: 7, 6

Career history
- 1998–1999: Los Angeles Lakers
- 2000: Golden State Warriors
- 2000: Olympiacos
- 2000–2001: Minnesota Timberwolves
- 2007: Cholet Basket

Career highlights
- Minnesota Mr. Basketball (1994)

Career statistics
- Points: 283 (4.2 ppg)
- Rebounds: 80 (1.2 rpg)
- Assists: 36 (0.5 apg)
- Stats at NBA.com
- Stats at Basketball Reference

Samuel Ryan Jacobson (born July 22, 1975) is an American former professional basketball player. He played professionally for the National Basketball Association's Los Angeles Lakers, Golden State Warriors, and Minnesota Timberwolves.

== Early life ==
Jacobson was born in Cottage Grove, Minnesota and played for Park High School in Cottage Grove. He was named Minnesota Mr. Basketball in his senior year.

== College career ==
He attended the University of Minnesota and helped lead the Golden Gophers to the 1997 NCAA Final Four as a junior and a National Invitation Tournament title as a senior.

== Professional career ==
Jacobson was drafted by the Los Angeles Lakers in the first round with the 26th pick of the 1998 NBA draft.

== Legal issues ==
Jacobson, along with his wife Traci Jacobson, were charged in Dakota County Court with theft by false representation and theft by swindle in connection with the August 2011 short-sale of his Apple Valley, Minnesota home. The charges state that Jacobson conspired with his then girlfriend Traci Quam to convince his lender, JPMorgan Chase, to "short sale" because Jacobson was in the process of declaring bankruptcy. Quam, who was his live-in girlfriend at the time, then purchased the home. Jacobson and his children still continued to live in the home even though the sale agreement with the lender required contained an "arm's length" condition that required the buyer and seller to be "unrelated parties ... acting in his or her own self-interest." Later in 2011, Quam sold the home for a $226,793.06 profit.

On November 14, 2017, Jacobson pleaded guilty to residential mortgage fraud over $35,000 in a Dakota County court. Jacobson's wife, Traci, pleaded guilty to aiding and abetting residential mortgage fraud. Count two against Sam Jacobson — theft by swindle over $35,000 — was amended to residential mortgage fraud, their attorney said, and count one — theft by false representation over $35,000 — was to be dismissed. Both Jacobsons were to be sentenced January 27, 2018.
