= Jefferson High School (Bloomington, Minnesota) =

Thomas Jefferson High School

Location
- 4001 West 102nd Street; Bloomington, Minnesota 55437; United States; 44.8179°N 93.3313°W

Information
- Type: Public secondary
- Established: 1970
- Principal: Mark Paulsen
- Teaching staff: 76.09 (FTE)
- Enrollment: 1,685 (2023-2024)
- Student to teacher ratio: 22.14
- Colors: Columbia Blue; Silver; White
- Athletics: Metro West Conference
- Nickname: Jaguars
- Website: bloomington.k12.mn.us/jhs

Thomas Jefferson High School, or simply Jefferson High School, is one of the two high schools in Bloomington, Minnesota, United States Independent School District No. 271. It is located at 102nd Street and France Avenue on the suburb's southwest side, and is part of the Bloomington Public Schools district. About 1,600 students attend in grades 9 through 12. The mascot is a Jaguar.

Jefferson was named a National Blue Ribbon School of Excellence by the US Department of Education in 2009.

== Activities and athletics ==
Bloomington Jefferson is a member of the Metro West Conference in the Minnesota State High School League. Jefferson High School joined the Lake Conference in 1970 until it left the Lake Conference to become a founding member of the South Suburban Conference in 2010. The school left the South Suburban Conference after the 2013–14 school year and joined the newly formed Metro West Conference for the 2014–15 school year.

The 2000–2001 boys hockey team is the subject of the 2003 book Blades of Glory by John Rosengren.

Minnesota State High School League State Championships
| Season | Sport | Number of Championships | Year |
|---|---|---|---|
| Fall | Competition Cheerleading, Girls | 4 | 2006, 2013, 2015, 2016 |
| Fall | Cross-Country Running, Girls | 1 | 1999 |
| Fall | Soccer, Boys | 1 | 2004 |
| Fall | Soccer, Girls | 3 | 1980, 1982, 1984 |
| Fall | Tennis, Girls | 3 | 19 |
| Winter | Basketball, Boys | 4 | 1976, 1982, 1986, 1987 |
| Winter | Debate | 1 | 1994 |
| Winter | Hockey, Boys | 5 | 1981, 1989, 1992, 1993, 1994 |
| Winter | Hockey, Girls | 1 | 2001 |
| Winter | Alpine Skiing, Boys | 1 | 2026 |
| Winter | Nordic Skiing, Boys | 2 | 1985, 1986 |
| Winter | Swimming and Diving, Boys | 2 | 1980, 1994 |
| Spring | Tennis, Boys | 3 | 1994, 1996, 1999 |
Minnesota Boys Scholastic Lacrosse Association State Championships
| Spring | Lacrosse, Boys | 2 | 2000, 2003 |
| Total | | 39 | |

== Performing arts ==
Jefferson has three curricular choirs including concert choir, bel canto, and chorale with two extra curricular student led acapella groups. Jefferson has two competitive show choirs, the mixed varsity "Connection" and the prep junior varsity "The JIVE".

The school’s band program includes four concert bands, two jazz bands, a pep band, show bands, and the Jaguar Marching Band. Since 1982, the Jefferson Marching Band has been the largest student organization in Bloomington Public Schools, with its highest membership reaching 254 students in 1975. The Jefferson Concert Bands have performed internationally in countries such as Canada, Spain, Algeria, Morocco, Mexico, England, Scotland, Japan, the Dominican Republic, Norway, Ireland, Costa Rica, Italy, Austria, Germany, Liechtenstein, Puerto Rico, and Greece.

== Principals ==
- Robert H. Smith 1970–1985
- Kent Stever 1985–1996
- John Bianchi 1996–1998
- Lyle Odland 1998–2002
- Steven Hill 2002–2013
- Kevin Groebner 2013–2016
- Dr. Jaysen Anderson 2016–2024
- Mark Paulsen 2024–Present

== Notable alumni ==
- Cole Aldrich – Former NBA Center, Minnesota Timberwolves
- Thomas E. Burnett Jr. – one of the passengers aboard United Flight 93 on September 11, 2001
- Ben Clymer – retired NHL left wing
- Brian Connelly – defenseman, Rockford IceHogs
- Mike Crowley – retired NHL defenseman
- Brian Dutcher - Head Coach, San Diego State Aztecs men's basketball
- Steve Edlefsen – former MLB pitcher, San Francisco Giants
- Tom Gilbert – retired NHL defenseman
- Julia Hart - Professional wrestler
- Ben Hendrickson – former MLB pitcher
- Elena Hayday – distance runner
- Christine Jax – former Commissioner of Education for the state of Minnesota
- Lane Kiffin – Head Coach, LSU Tigers football
- Tom Kurvers – retired NHL defenseman, 1984 Hobey Baker Memorial Award Winner
- Lloyd Lee – former NFL coach
- Nik Lentz – Minnesota State Champion wrestler; professional Mixed Martial Artist, currently for the UFC
- Kevin Lynch – retired NBA and European leagues forward
- Frank Moe - Minnesota state legislator and educator
- Mark Parrish – retired NHL forward, KFAN initial's game star; high school hockey coach
- Tom Pederson – retired NHL defenseman
- Toby Petersen – right wing, Dallas Stars
- Mod Sun – singer, rapper, and songwriter; birth name Derek Smith
- Nazanin Rafsanjani - television and radio producer
- Tom Ruud – former NFL linebacker, 19th pick in 1975 NFL draft
- Dan Trebil – retired NHL defenseman
- Joe Stansberry – Professional Golfer, PGA Tour, Senior PGA Tour and European Senior Tour.

== Construction and original curriculum ==
Thomas Jefferson High School in Bloomington was constructed to support a new curriculum offering. This curriculum used a Modular Scheduling approach to scheduling, based loosely on a lecture attendance and test attendance policy. Students were required to attend a certain number of class lectures a week, as well as test-times.

This approach called for a number of large 'lecture hall' type rooms, which could be subdivided if necessary.

The 'mod' approach was cancelled, beginning with the 1979–1980 school year, leaving a school ill-constructed for a more traditional subject-based classroom. In response, many of the large rooms were repartitioned into smaller class-rooms with thin, somewhat flexible walls. These walls did not block noise well, but created a perception of smaller classrooms, and were in use at least until the late 1990s.

Many of the teachers who came to Jefferson on its inception to be part of the new curriculum stayed on as it transitioned to a more traditional approach.

In 2011–2012 Jefferson switched from a traditional block schedule to a new 6 period schedule on Monday, Tuesday, Friday, and 3 periods on Wednesday, and Thursday. This new schedule offers students the opportunity to take early bird classes that commence before school starts, 6:50–7:40.

In the 2014–2015 school year, the school inserted five weeks of a modified block schedule called "Superblock." On Mondays and Tuesdays, students have 3 periods a day, each being two hours long. On Wednesdays and Thursdays, students still have 3 periods, but they are only an hour-and-a-half long and students are released early on these days. Friday follows the normal 6 period day. This schedule is used to accommodate state-mandated testing, such as the Minnesota Comprehensive Assessments (MCAs) and MAP exams.

== Class sizes ==
- 1978 – 898
- 1990 – 432
- 1994 – 402
- 2011 – 401
- 2015 – 420
- 2016 – 361
