= High school boys ice hockey in Minnesota =

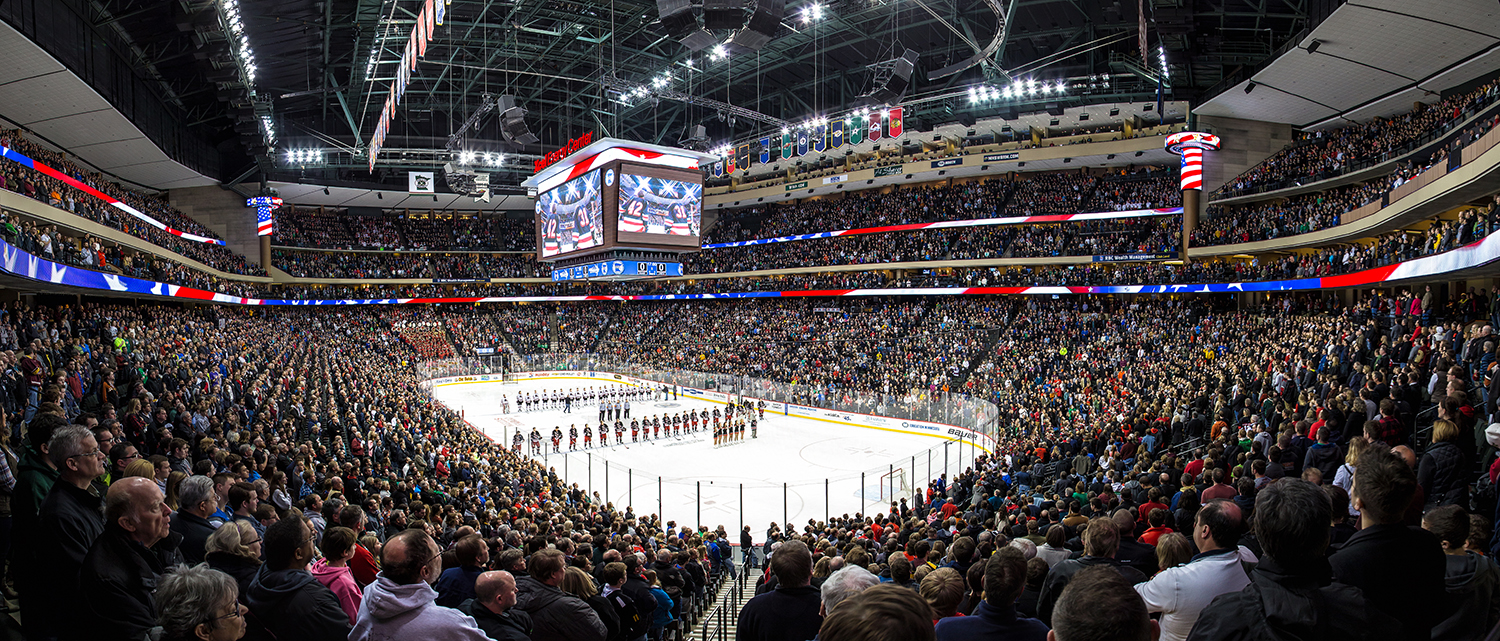
2015 Boys AA Championship game between Lakeville North and Duluth East at the Xcel Energy Center.

Minnesota boys high school ice hockey is made up of multiple leagues and programs representing different associations. The two organizations associated with high school are the Minnesota State High School League and Minnesota Hockey.

The Minnesota State High School League (MSHSL) is a voluntary, nonprofit association of public and private schools with a history of service to Minnesota's high school youth since 1916. The league consists of 141 varsity teams (64 AA and 77 A) competing for the state AA and A championships. The MSHSL is governed independently and is not an affiliate of USA Hockey.

Minnesota Hockey, an affiliate of USA Hockey, is the governing body of youth and amateur hockey in Minnesota. Minnesota Hockey is governed by a board of directors and consists of approximately 140 community based associations who are formed into 12 districts. Minnesota Hockey oversees the Junior Gold High School League consisting Junior Gold A, Gold B, and Gold 16 teams.

== Minnesota State High School League ==
=== Minnesota Class AA and A High School Hockey ===
Minnesota Class AA and A High School Hockey programs are members of the Minnesota State High School League (MSHSL). The league is made up of Varsity programs that are divided into two classes; AA and A. The classification is determined by enrollment, but schools have the option to both opt up or appeal, if they qualify, down in team sports every two years. Each class is further divided into eight sections.

=== Minnesota State High School League History ===
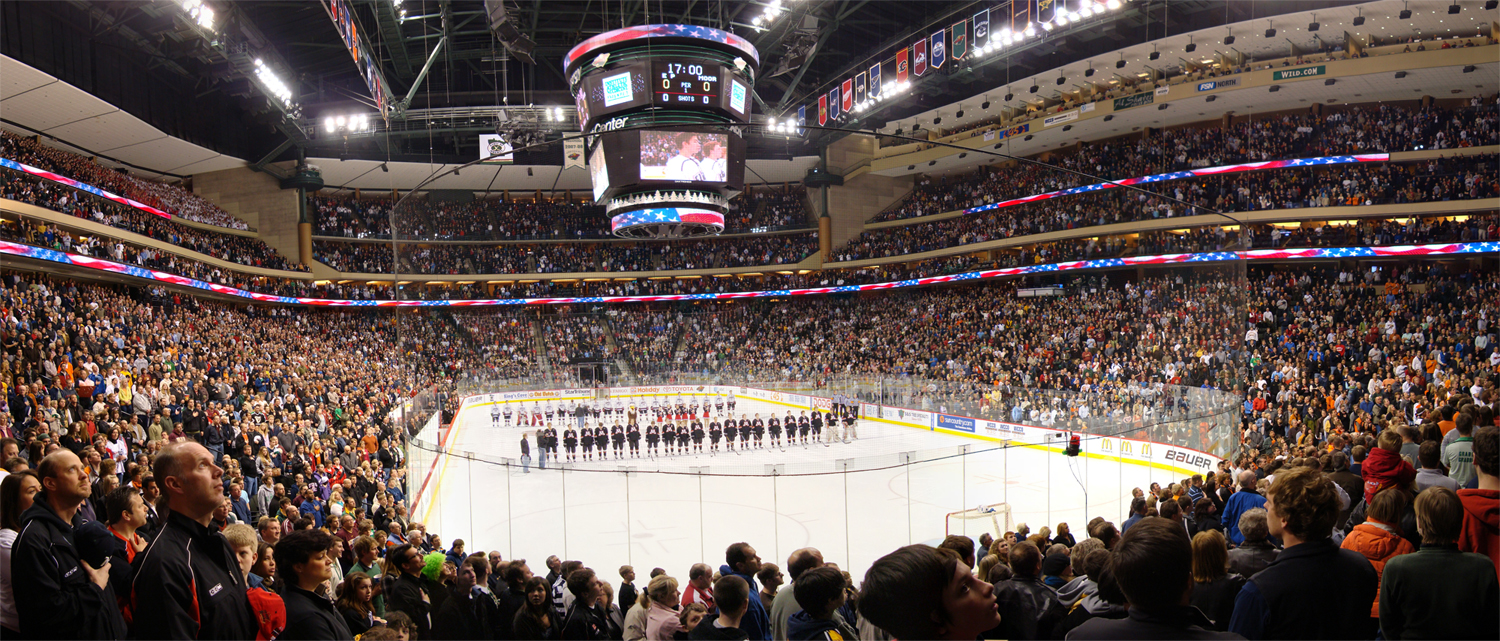
2009 Boys AA Championship game between Eden Prairie and Moorhead at the Xcel Energy Center.

High school hockey players throughout Minnesota participate in a maximum of 26 contests, excluding the section tournaments and the Minnesota State Boys' High School Hockey Tournament. Teams currently play three 17-minute periods to comprise a game. The lengthened periods were adopted by the Minnesota State High School League in 2003.

Boys' hockey concludes their season with a four-day tournament in March that features sixteen teams competing for championships in both classes. From 1945 through 1991 the tournament consisted of a single class, eight-team tournament instead of the present-day two-class (AA and A) tournament. Private schools were not allowed to play in the Tournament until the 1974–75 season. In 1992–93, the tournament was composed of Tier I and II teams. This two-year experiment sent the top teams from each of the eight sections to the Tier I portion of the tournament and the remaining teams conducted a playoff to determine who would be included in the Tier II tournament. In 1994, the dual-class system was adopted and teams were placed into a class structure based on school enrollments.

Since 1994, the MSHSL's process to determine section assignments for boys' hockey is based on school enrollments and activity classifications. The basic premise is to place the largest 64 schools into Class AA and the remaining high schools in Class A. Both Classes are then divided into 8 sections each. Teams are placed into their section assignments with geographic location as a primary consideration. High schools initially placed in Class A have the option to play at the Class AA level.

Beginning with the 2007 state tournament, the top four teams in each class are seeded. Coaches of the participating schools vote to determine the seeded teams the Saturday before the state tournament. The four teams are then bracketed so that if the seeded teams advance, the top seed plays the fourth seed while the second and third seeds play each other. The quarterfinal opponents of the seeded teams are determined by a blind draw.

=== Minnesota State High School Hockey Tournament ===
Based on tournament attendance, hockey is the most popular high school sport in the state. Attendance has been strong throughout the years, with 38 tournaments eclipsing the 100,000+ barrier. In 2017 Prep45.com partnered with GrandStadium.TV to stream the state tournament to viewers in 37 countries and all 50 states. The Minnesota State High School Hockey Tournament is currently the largest state sports tournament in terms of viewing and attendance, beating Florida's State High School Football Tournament and Indiana's State High School Basketball Tournament.

== Independent Hockey Programs ==
Shattuck-St. Mary's 18U AAA team plays in numerous high-level AAA teams from across North America in exhibition games and tournaments. They also compete the Upper Midwest High School Elite League, playing high-level independent AAA teams from Minnesota and neighboring states.

Shattuck-St. Mary's 18U Prep team competes in the Prep Hockey Conference as well as the Upper Midwest High School Elite Hockey League with tournament play throughout the United States and Canada.

NorthStar Christian Academy Knights 18U Prep team competes in high-level youth hockey, primarily in the North American Prospects Hockey League (NAPHL) at the 18U AAA level, often playing within the Tier I Conference for top competition, and also participates in showcases and tournaments like the Tier 1 Elite League events.

== Upper Midwest High School Elite League Hockey ==
The Upper Midwest High School Elite League Hockey provides players with development and high-level exposure in the months leading up to the high school season. The league consists of eight Minnesota teams:

1. APX

2. MPLS St. Paul Magazine

3. North Star Christian

4. SIT Mutual Funds

5. Spade

6. TDS Transportation

7. Team ND

8. Team Wisconsin 18U AAA, and

== CCM High Performance ==
=== Spring High Performance (HP) Programs ===
The CCM High Performance Spring programs provide players the opportunity to advance to national tournaments/camps which are used by USA Hockey to identify the top performers in each age group for possible opportunities to represent the U.S.A. at advanced levels of national and international hockey competition.

=== Fall Tier I Leagues ===
The CCM High Performance Tier I and Prospects Leagues offer players with a fall development league, featuring an emphasis on local training and a minimum of 15 games against the top competition in Minnesota and across the country. Teams also have the opportunity to compete for a chance to represent Minnesota at USA Hockey's Tier I and Tier II National Championships.

== Minnesota Junior Gold High School League ==
Several Minnesota high schools field Junior Gold teams in addition to or as an alternative to high school Junior Varsity. There are currently 61 Junior Gold A and B teams throughout Minnesota. The league is governed by Minnesota Hockey and is affiliated with USA Hockey. Minnesota Junior Gold teams are eligible for the Chipotle-USA Hockey National Championships.

Many Junior Gold players have made their high school team after playing a season or two of Junior Gold, and some Junior Gold players have gone onto play after high school in junior leagues such as the NAHL.

== 2024 - 25 National High School Hockey Rankings ==
According to MYHockey Rankings, Hill Murray High School is the number one ranked high school hockey team in the United States. The site ranked 2,169 high school teams for the 2024-25 season and 19 of the top 20 high school hockey teams are from Minnesota with 16 of the top 20 high school hockey teams being located in the Minneapolis–Saint Paul metropolitan area

National High School Hockey Rankings
Rank	School
1	Hill Murray High School (MN)
2	Stillwater High School (MN)
3	Moorhead High School (MN)
4	Cretin Derham Hall High School (MN)
5	Rogers High School (MN)
6	Saint Thomas Academy (MN)
7	Edina High School (MN)
8	Shakopee High School (MN)
9	Rosemount High School (MN)
10	Benilde-St. Margaret's High School (MN)
11	Eden Prairie High School (MN)
12	Holy Angels High School (MN)
13	White Bear Lake High School (MN)
14	Wayzata High School (MN)
15	Minnetonka High School (MN)
16	Delbarton School (NJ)
17	Lakeville South High School (MN)
18	Maple Grove High School (MN)
19	Hermantown High School (MN)
20	Grand Rapids High School (MN)

MyHockey Rankings also ranked Shattuck-St. Mary's (MN) Prep team as the top Prep / Independent team in the United States. Northstar Christian Academy (MN) was ranked #5.

MaxPreps also publishes its own version of high school ice hockey rankings. However, these rankings are often criticized for being inaccurate and unreliable, leading many in the sports community to question the company's algorithm and overall credibility. Information for several hundred ice hockey teams has either been incomplete, inaccurate, or entirely missing. Numerous teams have had incorrect game results and schedules listed, which prevents the algorithm from accurately evaluating a team's strength of schedule and quality wins against highly ranked opponents. The reliance on coaches' participation further exacerbates this issue. When coaches from the nation's top programs fail to correct or report errors, the inaccuracies in the rankings grow. Moreover, the lack of transparency in MaxPreps' ranking formula has intensified concerns about the flaws in their system.

== Historical timeline ==
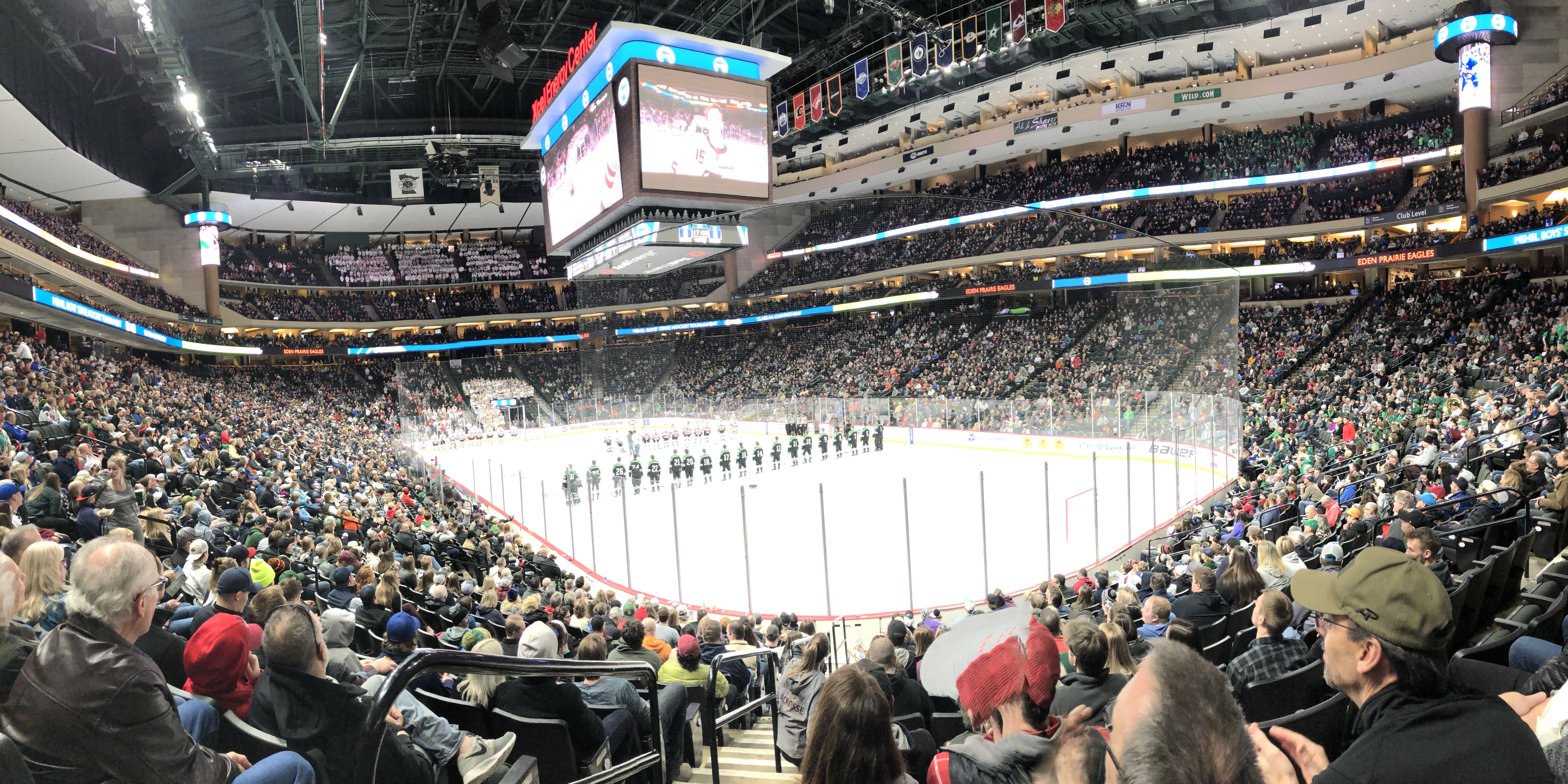
2020 Boys' AA Championship game between Eden Prairie and Hill Murray at the Xcel Energy Center.

- 1905 – Saint Paul Academy fields what is believed to be the oldest varsity team in the state
- 1930s – High school hockey played at approximately 25 schools in Minnesota
- 1945 – First MSHSL Boys State High School Hockey Tournament held at St. Paul Auditorium
- 1949–1964 – Prep. School Hockey Tournament (for Private Schools)
- 1965–1970 – Catholic School Hockey Tournament
- 1969 – The tournament moves to Met Center in Bloomington, home of the Minnesota North Stars NHL team
- 1970–1974 – Independent School Hockey Tournament
- 1974–Present public schools and private schools can play in the same tournament
- 1976 – The tournament moves to the St. Paul Civic Center.
- 1992 – Tier I and Tier II structure adopted; the Target Center in Minneapolis hosted the Tier II tournament
- 1994 – Class AA and A structure adopted.
- 1999 – The tournament moved to the Target Center in Minneapolis
- 2001 – The tournament moved to the Xcel Energy Center in St. Paul, home of the new Minnesota Wild NHL team
- 2003 – Period length changed from 15 to 17 minutes
- 2007 – Coaches seed top four teams in each class
- 2008 – 19,559 fans attended the 2008 State Boys' Hockey Tournament Class AA semifinals at Xcel Energy Center, March 7, setting a new record for the largest crowd to ever attend a hockey game in the state of Minnesota
- 2015 – 21,609 fans attended the 2015 State Boys' Hockey Tournament Class AA semifinals at Xcel Energy Center, March 6, setting a new record for the largest crowd to ever attend a hockey game in the state of Minnesota
- 2016 – 22,244 fans attended the 2016 State Boys' Hockey Tournament Class AA semifinals at Xcel Energy Center, March 4, setting a new record for the largest crowd to ever attend a hockey game in the state of Minnesota

== Current high school varsity programs and conferences ==
School	Nickname	City	Class	Current Conference	Tournament Appearances	Consolation Champions	Third Place	Tournament Finals	Championships
Albert Lea	Tigers	Albert Lea	A	Big Nine	2004, 2005, 2007				
Austin	Packers	Austin	A	Big Nine	1993, 2001				
Faribault	Falcons	Faribault	A	Big Nine	1993				
Mankato East	Cougars	Mankato	A	Big Nine	2006, 2018, 2020, 2022				
Mankato West	Scarlets	Mankato	A	Big Nine	2008, 2016, 2026				
Northfield	Raiders	Northfield	A	Big Nine	2017, 2023, 2024, 2025	2025			
Owatonna	Huskies	Owatonna	AA	Big Nine	1998				
Red Wing	Wingers	Red Wing	A	Big Nine	1995, 1996, 1997, 1998, 1999, 2002		1998	1996, 1997, 2002	1997
Rochester Century/John Marshall	Panthers	Rochester	AA	Big Nine	1977, 1978, 1979, 1988, 1989, 1996, 2005, 2007, 2009, 2024		2007	1977, 1979, 1989	1977
Rochester Mayo	Spartans	Rochester	AA	Big Nine	1982, 1992, 1994, 1995, 1997, 1999, 2000				
Winona	Winhawks	Winona	A	Big Nine	1952				
Fairmont	Cardinals	Fairmont	A	Big South					
Luverne	Cardinals	Luverne	A	Big South	2014, 2017, 2023, 2025				
Marshall	Tigers	Marshall	A	Big South	2013				
Minnesota River	Bulldogs	Co-op	A	Big South	2019				
New Ulm	Eagles	New Ulm	A	Big South	1992, 2010, 2011, 2012, 2015, 2019, 2024				
Redwood Valley	Cardinals	Redwood Falls	A	Big South					
Waseca	Bluejays	Waseca	A	Big South					
Windom	Eagles	Windom	A	Big South					
Worthington	Trojans	Worthington	A	Big South					
Alexandria	Cardinals	Alexandria	A	Central Lakes	1992, 1996, 2010, 2011, 2018, 2022, 2023, 2024	1996		2018	
Brainerd	Warriors	Brainerd	AA	Central Lakes					
Detroit Lakes	Lakers	Detroit Lakes	A	Central Lakes	1995, 1996				
Fergus Falls	Otters	Fergus Falls	A	Central Lakes	1997, 1998, 1999, 2000, 2001, 2002, 2003		1999		
River Lakes	Stars	Co-op	A	Central Lakes					
Sartell-Saint Stephen	Sabres	Sartell	AA	Central Lakes					
Sauk Rapids-Rice	Storm	Sauk Rapids	A	Central Lakes	2000				
Saint Cloud	Crush	St. Cloud	AA	Central Lakes					
Willmar	Cardinals	Willmar	A	Central Lakes	1947				
The Blake School	Bears	Minneapolis	AA	Independent Metro Athletic	1949 (I), 1950 (I), 1951 (I), 1952 (I), 1953 (I), 1954 (I), 1955 (I), 1956 (I), 1957 (I), 1958 (I), 1959 (I), 1960 (I), 1961 (I), 1962 (I), 1963 (I), 1964 (I), 1970 (I), 1971 (I), 1972 (I), 1973 (I), 1974 (I), 1995 (A), 1999 (A), 2006 (A), 2007 (A), 2008 (A), 2020 (AA)	1961 (I), 1972 (I), 1999, 2006	1959 (I), 1970 (I), 1974 (I), 2020	1950 (I), 1956 (I), 1962 (I), 1964 (I), 1971 (I), 1973 (I)	1964 (I), 1971 (I), 1973 (I)
Breck	Mustangs	Golden Valley	A	Independent Metro Athletic	1949 (I), 1950 (I), 1951 (I), 1952 (I), 1953 (I), 1954 (I), 1955 (I), 1956 (I), 1959 (I), 1960 (I), 1961 (I), 1962 (I), 1963 (I), 1964 (I), 1971 (I), 1972 (I), 1973 (I), 1974 (I), 1994, 1996, 1997, 2000, 2004, 2009, 2010, 2011, 2012, 2013, 2015, 2016	1997	1996, 2012, 2013	1955 (I), 1959 (I), 2000, 2004, 2009, 2010, 2016	2000, 2004, 2009, 2010
Providence Academy	Lions	Plymouth	A	Independent Metro Athletic					
Saint Paul Academy and Summit School	Spartans	Saint Paul	A	Independent Metro Athletic	1949 (I), 1950 (I), 1951 (I), 1952 (I), 1953 (I), 1954 (I), 1955 (I), 1956 (I), 1957 (I), 1958 (I), 1959 (I), 1960 (I), 1961 (I), 1962 (I), 1963 (I), 1964 (I), 1970 (I), 1972 (I), 1973 (I), 1974 (I), 2016	1973 (I)		1953 (I), 1961 (I), 1962 (I), 1963 (I), 1974 (I)	1961 (I), 1962 (I), 1974 (I)
Little Falls	Flyers	Little Falls	A	Granite Ridge	2005, 2006, 2007, 2008, 2009, 2012, 2021	2008, 2012	2009, 2021		
Saint Cloud Cathedral	Crusaders	St. Cloud	A	Granite Ridge	1993, 1994, 2004, 2008, 2009, 2014, 2016, 2017, 2019, 2020, 2023, 2024, 2025, 2026	2016, 2023, 2026	2017, 2020	2019, 2024, 2025	2019, 2024
Northern Lakes	Lightning	Co-op	A	Granite Ridge	2021, 2025, 2026				
Dodge County	Wildcats	Co-op	A	Independents	2021, 2026			2021	
Duluth East	Greyhounds	Duluth	AA	Independents	1958, 1960, 1961, 1964, 1975, 1991, 1994, 1995, 1996, 1997, 1998, 2000, 2003, 2004, 2005, 2009, 2010, 2011, 2012, 2013, 2014, 2015, 2018, 2019	1975, 2010, 2019	1961, 1994, 1996, 2004, 2005, 2013	1960, 1991, 1995, 1997, 1998, 2000, 2011, 2015, 2018	1960, 1995, 1998
Gentry Academy	Stars	Vadnais Heights	AA	Independents	2021 (A), 2026 (AA)			2021 (A)	2021 (A)
Hopkins	Royals	Minnetonka	AA	Independents	1975, 1980				
La Crescent-Hokah	Lancers	La Crescent	A	Independents					
Rochester Lourdes	Lourdes	Rochester	A	Independents	1974 (I), 2000, 2001, 2002, 2003, 2009, 2010, 2011, 2012, 2013	2009, 2010, 2011	2002	2001	
Saint Paul Johnson	Governors	Saint Paul	A	Independents	1946, 1947, 1951, 1952, 1953, 1954, 1955, 1956, 1957, 1959, 1961, 1963, 1964, 1965, 1966, 1967, 1968, 1970, 1971, 1984, 1991, 1995	1953, 1956, 1961	1954, 1965, 1968	1947, 1951, 1953, 1955, 1963, 1964, 1967	1947, 1953, 1955, 1963
Greenway of Coleraine	Raiders	Coleraine	A	Iron Range	1962, 1966, 1967, 1968, 1969, 1970, 1987, 1992, 2001, 2019	1966, 1969	1987, 2001	1967, 1968, 1992, 2019	1967, 1968, 1992
International Falls	Broncos	International Falls	A	Iron Range	1950, 1956, 1957, 1958, 1959, 1962, 1963, 1964, 1965, 1966, 1968, 1971, 1972, 1973, 1983, 1989, 1995, 2000, 2002	1950	1959, 1971, 1973, 2000	1956, 1957, 1962, 1963, 1964, 1965, 1966, 1972, 1995	1957, 1962, 1964, 1965, 1966, 1972, 1995
North Shore	Storm	Co-op	A	Iron Range	1999				
Buffalo	Bison	Buffalo	AA	Lake					
Eden Prairie	Eagles	Eden Prairie	AA	Lake	1992, 1999, 2001, 2003, 2009, 2011, 2014, 2015, 2016, 2017, 2019, 2020, 2021		2017	2009, 2011, 2016, 2019, 2020, 2021	2009, 2011, 2021
Edina	Hornets	Edina	AA	Lake	1955, 1956, 1957, 1960, 1962, 1967, 1968, 1969, 1970, 1971, 1972, 1973, 1974, 1977, 1978, 1979, 1981, 1982, 1983, 1984, 1987, 1988, 1989, 1995, 1996, 1997, 1998, 2000, 2007, 2008, 2009, 2010, 2011, 2012, 2013, 2014, 2015, 2018, 2019, 2022, 2023, 2024, 2025, 2026	1957, 1962, 1972, 1983, 1989, 2007, 2009, 2022	1995, 2015, 2018, 2025	1969, 1970, 1971, 1974, 1977, 1978, 1979, 1982, 1984, 1988, 1996, 1997, 2008, 2010, 2013, 2014, 2019, 2023, 2024	1969, 1971, 1974, 1978, 1979, 1982, 1984, 1988, 1997, 2010, 2013, 2014, 2019, 2024
Minnetonka	Skippers	Minnetonka	AA	Lake	1985, 1990, 1994, 2006, 2010, 2018, 2023, 2026	2006	1990	2010, 2018, 2023, 2026	2018, 2023
Saint Michael-Albertville	Knights	St. Michael	AA	Lake	2018				
Wayzata	Trojans	Plymouth	AA	Lake	1954, 2004, 2013, 2016, 2017, 2021		2021	2016	2016
Cloquet-Esko-Carlton	Lumberjacks	Cloquet	AA	Lake Superior	1982, 1992, 1993, 2002, 2008	1982, 1993			
Duluth Denfeld	Hunters	Duluth	A	Lake Superior	1986, 1988, 1989	1988	1986, 1989		
The Marshall School	Hilltoppers	Duluth	AA	Lake Superior	1958 (I), 1959 (I), 1965 (I), 1966 (I), 1967 (I), 1968 (I), 1969 (I), 1970 (I), 1971 (I), 1972 (I), 1973 (I), 1974 (I), 2001, 2005, 2006, 2007, 2008, 2012, 2013	1971 (I), 1974 (I), 2013	2005	1965 (I), 1966 (I), 1967 (I), 1968 (I), 1969 (I), 1970 (I), 1972 (I), 2006, 2007, 2008	1965 (I), 1966 (I), 1967 (I), 1968 (I), 1969 (I)
Grand Rapids	Thunderhawks	Grand Rapids	AA	Lake Superior	1972, 1974, 1975, 1976, 1977, 1978, 1979, 1980, 1981, 1988, 1990, 1991, 2006, 2007, 2016, 2017, 2024, 2026	1979, 1981, 2026	1974, 1977, 2016	1972, 1975, 1976, 1978, 1980, 1990, 2006, 2007, 2017	1975, 1976, 1980, 2017
Hermantown	Hawks	Hermantown	A	Lake Superior	1994, 1998, 1999, 2001, 2006, 2007, 2010, 2011, 2012, 2013, 2014, 2015, 2016, 2017, 2018, 2020, 2021, 2022, 2023, 2024		2001, 2006, 2018, 2023	1998, 2007, 2010, 2011, 2012, 2013, 2014, 2015, 2016, 2017, 2020, 2022, 2024	2007, 2016, 2017, 2022
Proctor	Rails	Proctor	A	Lake Superior	1997		1997		
Rock Ridge	Wolverines	Co-op	AA	Lake Superior					
Hibbing-Chisholm	Bluejackets	Hibbing	A	Lake Superior	1952, 1967, 1970, 1973, 1974, 1982, 1984, 1985, 1986, 1994, 2003, 2004, 2011, 2025, 2026	1974, 1985, 2003	1967, 1970, 1982, 1984, 2004	1952, 1973, 1994, 2026	1952, 1973
Bemidji	Lumberjacks	Bemidji	AA	Mariucci	1972, 1973, 1974, 1976, 1985, 1986, 2015, 2016	1986, 2016		1974	
Crookston	Pirates	Crookston	A	Mariucci					
East Grand Forks	Green Wave	East Grand Forks	A	Mariucci	1971, 1980, 1982, 1998, 1999, 2001, 2002, 2013, 2014, 2015, 2017, 2019, 2021, 2025	1998, 2001, 2002	2021	1999, 2014, 2015, 2025	2014, 2015, 2025
Moorhead	Spuds	Moorhead	AA	Mariucci	1992, 1993, 1994, 1995, 1997, 2001, 2002, 2003, 2004, 2005, 2009, 2011, 2012, 2013, 2017, 2019, 2020, 2021, 2022, 2023, 2025, 2026	2013	1993, 1997	1992, 1994, 1995, 2001, 2004, 2005, 2009, 2017, 2025, 2026	2025, 2026
Roseau	Rams	Roseau	AA	Mariucci	1946, 1947, 1953, 1955, 1957, 1958, 1959, 1961, 1962, 1963, 1964, 1965, 1966, 1967, 1968, 1969, 1971, 1975, 1977, 1978, 1979, 1981, 1983, 1984, 1990, 1991, 1998, 1999, 2000, 2006, 2007, 2008, 2010, 2014	1964, 1967, 1968, 1984, 2000, 2014	1963, 1978, 1979	1946, 1947, 1957, 1958, 1959, 1961, 1962, 1966, 1971, 1990, 1999, 2007	1946, 1958, 1959, 1961, 1990, 1999, 2007
Thief River Falls	Prowlers	Thief River Falls	A	Mariucci	1945, 1951, 1954, 1955, 1956, 1959, 1960, 1965, 2006, 2011, 2012, 2016, 2018	1952, 1955, 1959, 2018	1951, 2011, 2016	1945, 1954, 1956	1954, 1956
Warroad	Warriors	Warroad	A	Mariucci	1948, 1949, 1953, 1963, 1969, 1970, 1987, 1988, 1989, 1994, 1995, 1996, 1997, 2000, 2003, 2004, 2005, 2007, 2008, 2009, 2010, 2020, 2022, 2023, 2024, 2026	2004	1949, 1995, 2008, 2010, 2024	1948, 1953, 1969, 1994, 1996, 1997, 2000, 2003, 2005, 2009, 2022, 2023, 2026	1994, 1996, 2003, 2005, 2026
Hastings	Raiders	Hastings	AA	Metro East	1971, 1985, 1998, 1999, 2000, 2001	1971, 1998	2000	1999	
Hill-Murray	Pioneers	Maplewood	AA	Metro East	1962 (I), 1963 (I), 1964 (I), 1965 (I), 1966 (I), 1967 (I), 1968 (I), 1969 (I), 1970 (I), 1971 (I), 1972 (I), 1973 (I), 1974 (I), 1975, 1976, 1977, 1978, 1979, 1980, 1983, 1984, 1985, 1986, 1987, 1988, 1991, 1992, 1993, 1997, 1999, 2000, 2002, 2006, 2007, 2008, 2009, 2010, 2012, 2013, 2015, 2017, 2018, 2020, 2021, 2022, 2023	1966 (I), 1977, 1978, 2023	1973 (I), 1975, 1976, 2010, 2022	1964 (I), 1965 (I), 1969 (I), 1970 (I), 1971 (I), 1972 (I), 1974 (I), 1980, 1983, 1985, 1986, 1988, 1991, 1993, 2002, 2008, 2012, 2013, 2020	1970 (I), 1972 (I), 1983, 1991, 2008, 2020
Mahtomedi	Zephyrs	Mahtomedi	A	Metro East	1992, 1994, 1997, 1998, 2001, 2009, 2010, 2015, 2017, 2018, 2019, 2020, 2022, 2023, 2024, 2025, 2026		1994, 2015, 2019, 2022, 2026	2020, 2023	2020, 2023
Simley	Spartans	Inver Grove Heights	A	Metro East	1996, 2003	1996		2003	
South Saint Paul	Packers	South St. Paul	A	Metro East	1947, 1948, 1950, 1953, 1954, 1955, 1957, 1958, 1959, 1960, 1961, 1962, 1965, 1966, 1968, 1969, 1972, 1977, 1978, 1980, 1981, 1986, 1987, 1989, 1990, 1994, 1996, 2004	1947, 1987	1955, 1958, 1962, 1966, 1969, 1981	1961, 1968	
Saint Thomas Academy	Cadets	Mendota Heights	AA	Metro East	1949 (I), 1950 (I), 1951 (I), 1952 (I), 1953 (I), 1954 (I), 1955 (I), 1956 (I), 1957 (I), 1958 (I), 1960 (I), 1962 (I), 1964 (I), 1968 (I), 1969 (I), 1970 (I), 1971 (I), 1999 (A), 2005 (A), 2006 (A), 2007 (A), 2008 (A), 2011 (A), 2012 (A), 2013 (A), 2015, 2017, 2018, 2019, 2020, 2021, 2025	1970 (I), 2015 (A), 2017, 2018	2007 (A)	1949 (I), 1951 (I), 1952 (I), 1955 (I), 1958 (I), 2006 (A), 2008 (A), 2011 (A), 2012 (A), 2013 (A)	1951 (I), 1955 (I), 2006 (A), 2008 (A), 2011 (A), 2012 (A), 2013 (A)
Tartan	Titans	Oakdale	A	Metro East	2004, 2005				
Two Rivers	Warriors	Mendota Heights	A	Metro East	1973, 1974, 1975, 1976, 1982, 1983, 1993, 1997		1983, 1993		
Benilde-St. Margaret's	Red Knights	St. Louis Park Heights	AA	Metro West	1961 (I), 1963 (I), 1964 (I), 1965 (I), 1966 (I), 1967 (I), 1969 (I), 1970 (I), 1971 (I), 1972 (I), 1973 (I), 1974 (I), 1999, 2001, 2008, 2012		1966 (I), 1971 (I), 2008	1967 (I), 1999, 2001, 2012	1999 (A), 2001 (A), 2012
Bloomington Jefferson	Jaguars	Bloomington	AA	Metro West	1980, 1981, 1982, 1985, 1986, 1988, 1989, 1992, 1993, 1994, 1995, 1997, 1998, 2000, 2002, 2005	1995	1980, 1988, 1998	1981, 1989, 1992, 1993, 1994	1981, 1989, 1992, 1993, 1994
Chanhassen	Storm	Chanhassen	AA	Metro West	2024			2024	
Chaska	Hawks	Chaska	AA	Metro West					
Saint Louis Park	Orioles	St. Louis Park	AA	Metro West	1948, 1949, 1953, 1958, 1998, 2003				
Orono	Spartans	Long Lake	A	Metro West	1992, 1993, 2002, 2003, 2004, 2006, 2007, 2014, 2018, 2023, 2024, 2025	1993, 2007, 2024	1992, 2003, 2025	2004, 2018	2018
Waconia	Wildcats	Waconia	A	Metro West					
New Prague	Trojans	New Prague	A	Metro West	2014, 2015, 2022	2015	2014		
Becker/Big Lake	Eagles	Co-op	A	Mississippi 8					
Cambridge-Isanti	Bluejackets	Cambridge	A	Mississippi 8	1992				
Chisago Lakes	Wildcats	Lindstrom	A	Mississippi 8	1995, 2014				
Monticello	Moose	Co-op	A	Mississippi 8	2017, 2018, 2020, 2022			2017	
Northern Edge	Stars	Co-op	A	Mississippi 8					
Pine City Area	Dragons	Pine City	A	Mississippi 8					
Princeton	Tigers	Princeton	A	Mississippi 8	2002, 2003, 2016				
Bagley-Fosston	Flyers	Bagley	A	Northwest					
Kittson Central	Bearcats	Hallock	A	Northwest					
Lake Of The Woods	Bears	Baudette	A	Northwest	1993			1993	
Red Lake Falls	Eagles	Red Lake Falls	A	Northwest					
Andover	Huskies	Andover	AA	Northwest Suburban	2020, 2021, 2022, 2023, 2025, 2026	2020	2023	2022	2022
Anoka	Tornadoes	Anoka	AA	Northwest Suburban	1985, 1990, 1997, 1998, 2003, 2016	1997	1985	1998, 2003	2003
Armstrong-Cooper	Wings	Plymouth	AA	Northwest Suburban					
Blaine	Bengals	Blaine	AA	Northwest Suburban	1992, 1996, 1999, 2000, 2006, 2007, 2008, 2009, 2010, 2011, 2015, 2019	1999	1992, 2006, 2009, 2019	2000	2000
Centennial	Cougars	Circle Pines	AA	Northwest Suburban	2004, 2013, 2014, 2018, 2024	2024		2004	2004
Champlin Park	Rebels	Champlin	AA	Northwest Suburban	1995				
Elk River Area	Elks	Elk River	AA	Northwest Suburban	1993, 1999, 2001, 2002, 2004, 2005, 2024	2002	1999	2001	2001
Maple Grove	Crimson	Maple Grove	AA	Northwest Suburban	2012, 2017, 2020, 2021, 2022, 2023		2021	2022	
Osseo	Orioles	Osseo	AA	Northwest Suburban	1994				
Rogers High School	Royals	Rogers	AA	Northwest Suburban	2025				
Spring Lake Park-Coon Rapids	Panthers	Co-op	AA	Northwest Suburban	2015				
Totino-Grace	Eagles	Fridley	AA	Northwest Suburban	1993, 1995, 2002, 2005, 2014	2014		1995, 2002, 2005	2002
Eagan	Wildcats	Eagan	AA	South Suburban	2006, 2011, 2012, 2014		2011, 2014		
Eastview	Lightning	Apple Valley	AA	South Suburban	2001, 2013				
Farmington	Tigers	Farmington	AA	South Suburban	1994, 2000, 2016	2000			
Lakeville North	Panthers	Lakeville	AA	South Suburban	2002, 2003, 2004, 2006, 2010, 2011, 2013, 2014, 2015, 2018	2011		2014, 2015	2015
Lakeville South	Cougars	Lakeville	AA	South Suburban	2008, 2012, 2017, 2019, 2020, 2021, 2022, 2023, 2025, 2026		2012	2021	
Prior Lake	Lakers	Savage	AA	South Suburban	2022				
Rosemount	Irish	Rosemount	AA	South Suburban	1992, 2026		2026	1992	
Shakopee	Sabers	Shakopee	AA	South Suburban	2005, 2025	2025			
Apple Valley / Burnsville	Eagles	Co-op	AA	South Suburban	1981, 1983, 1984, 1985, 1986, 1987, 1990, 1991, 1992, 1993, 1996, 2007, 2010, 2016	1992, 2001	1991	1983, 1985, 1986, 1987, 1996	1985, 1986, 1996
Forest Lake	Rangers	Forest Lake	AA	Suburban East					
Mounds View	Mustangs	Arden Hills	AA	Suburban East	1968, 1969, 1976, 1977, 1978				
Roseville	Raiders	Roseville	AA	Suburban East	1963, 1964, 1965, 1971, 1972, 1973, 1987, 2002, 2003	1963, 1965	2002	1973, 2003	
White Bear Lake Area	Bears	White Bear Lake	AA	Suburban East	1945, 1946, 1949, 1951, 1956, 1966, 1967, 1970, 1982, 1989, 1990, 1994, 1995, 1996, 1998, 2001, 2003, 2005, 2011, 2019, 2024	1945, 1990, 1994, 2003, 2005		1982	
Cretin-Derham Hall	Raiders	Saint Paul	AA	Suburban East	1949, (I), 1950 (I), 1951 (I), 1952 (I), 1953 (I), 1954 (I), 1955 (I), 1956 (I), 1957 (I), 1958 (I), 1959 (I), 1960 (I), 1961 (I), 1962 (I), 1963 (I), 1964 (I), 1965 (I), 1966 (I), 1967 (I), 1968 (I), 1969 (I), 1970 (I), 1971 (I), 1973 (I), 1974 (I), 1988, 2006, 2009, 2022, 2023, 2024	1962 (I), 1968 (I)	1964 (I), 1969 (I), 2024	1949 (I), 1950 (I), 1951 (I), 1952 (I), 1953 (I), 1954 (I), 1956 (I), 1957 (I), 1958 (I), 1959 (I), 1960 (I), 1961 (I), 1963 (I), 1973 (I), 2006	1949 (I), 1950 (I), 1952 (I), 1953 (I), 1954 (I), 1956 (I), 1957 (I), 1958 (I), 1959 (I), 1960 (I), 1963 (I), 2006
East Ridge	Raptors	Woodbury	AA	Suburban East					
Park of Cottage Grove	Wolfpack	Cottage Grove	AA	Suburban East					
Stillwater	Ponies	Stillwater	AA	Suburban East	2014, 2016, 2025			2025	
Woodbury	Royals	Woodbury	AA	Suburban East	2007, 2008	2008			
Academy of Holy Angels	Stars	Richfield	AA	Tri-Metro	1999, 2002, 2003, 2004, 2005	1999, 2004	2003	2002, 2005	2002, 2005
Minneapolis	Minneapolis	Minneapolis	A	Tri-Metro	1946, 1947, 1948, 1949, 1950, 1951, 1952, 1953, 1954, 1955, 1956, 1957, 1958, 1959, 1960, 1961, 1962, 1963, 1964, 1965, 1966, 1967, 1968, 1969, 1970, 1971, 1972, 1973, 1974, 1975, 1976, 1977, 1978, 1979, 1980, 1992, 1993, 1994, 2022	1949, 1958, 1973, 1992, 1994, 2022	1952, 1957, 1960, 1964, 1972	1955, 1959, 1970, 1975	1970
Saint Paul Highland Park	Scots	Saint Paul	A	Tri-Metro					
Bloomington Kennedy	Eagles	Bloomington	A	Tri-Metro	1966, 1976, 1983, 1984, 1987, 1990, 1991	1976		1984, 1987	1987
Irondale	Knights	New Brighton	AA	Tri-Metro	1979, 1980, 1981	1980		1981	
Ely Memorial	Timberwolves	Ely	A	Two Rivers					
Moose Lake Area	Rebels	Moose Lake	A	Two Rivers					
Mora-Milaca	Mustangs	Mora	A	Two Rivers	1996, 1997				
Breckenridge-Wahpeton	Blades	Co-op	A	West Central					
Morris-Benson	Storm	Co-op	A	West Central					
Park Rapids	Panthers	Park Rapids	A	West Central					
Prairie Centre	North Stars	Co-op	A	West Central					
Wadena-Deer Creek	Wolverines	Wadena	A	West Central	2004				
Delano-Rockford	Tigers	Delano	A	Wright County	2017, 2019, 2020, 2021, 2026	2017, 2019, 2020			
Holy Family Catholic	Fire	Victoria	AA	Wright County					
Hutchinson	Tigers	Hutchinson	A	Wright County	1995, 1997, 2000, 2009, 2020	1995			
Litchfield-Dassel-Cokato	Dragons	Litchfield	A	Wright County	1996, 2008, 2016, 2018, 2021				
Mound-Westonka	White Hawks	Minnetrista	A	Wright County	1998, 2001				
Southwest Christian/Richfield	Stars	Chaska	A	Wright County	1962, 1963, 1964, 1976, 1986, 1991	1991		1976	

== Defunct Teams ==
School	Nickname	Class	Tournament Appearances	Consolation Champions	Third place	Tournament Finals	Championships
Alexander Ramsey High School	Rams		1963,1964,1965,1971,1972,1973			1973	
Archbishop Brady	Broncos	I	1968 (I), 1969 (I), 1972 (I)		1972 (I)		
Babbitt	Knights						
Bloomington	Bears		1961, 1964, 1965			1965	
Bloomington Lincoln	Bears		1975				
Brooklyn Center	Centaurs						
Chisholm	Bluestreaks						
Columbia Heights	Hylanders		1983				
Concordia Academy	Beacons	I	1951 (I), 1952 (I), 1953 (I), 1955 (I), 1957 (I), 1958 (I)				
Crookston Cathedral/Mount Saint Benedict	Blue Wave	I	1951 (I), 1965 (I), 1966 (I), 1967 (I), 1968 (I), 1969 (I), 1970 (I), 1971 (I), 1972 (I), 1973 (I)				
DeLaSalle	Islanders	I	1959 (I), 1960 (I), 1961 (I), 1962 (I), 1963 (I), 1966 (I), 1967 (I)		1960 (I)		
Duluth Central	Trojans	A	1954, 1996(A)				
Edina West	Cougars		1981				
Eveleth	Golden Bears		1945, 1946, 1947, 1948, 1949, 1950, 1951, 1952, 1953, 1954, 1955, 1956, 1960		1946, 1953, 1956	1945, 1948, 1949, 1950, 1951, 1952, 1954	1945, 1948, 1949, 1950, 1951
Eveleth-Gilbert	Golden Bears	A	1993, 1998			1993, 1998	1993, 1998
Frank B. Kellogg	Chargers		1974				
Fridley	Tigers						
Granite Falls	Kilowatts		1945, 1946				
Hopkins Lindbergh	Flyers		1975, 1980				
Le Sueur-Henderson/ Saint Peter	Bulldogs						
Legacy Christian Academy	Lions						
Maranatha Christian Academy	Mustangs						
Minneapolis Central	Pioneers		1949, 1950				
Minneapolis Edison	Tomcats	A	1994	1994			
Minneapolis Marshall-University	Cardinals						
Minneapolis Camden (formerly Patrick Henry)	Patriots		1959, 1960, 1964		1960, 1964		
Minneapolis Roosevelt	Teddies	A	1956, 1958, 1961, 1963, 1966, 1967, 1974, 1978, 1992	1958, 1992			
Minneapolis South	Gallant Tigers		1950, 1954, 1955, 1957, 1993		1957		
Minneapolis Southwest	Indians/Lakers		1951, 1952, 1953, 1955, 1965, 1968, 1969, 1970, 1971, 1972, 1973, 1975, 1976, 1977, 1980	1973	1952, 1972	1955, 1970, 1975	1970
Minneapolis Washburn	Millers		1948, 1949, 1959, 1960, 1962, 1979	1949		1959	
Minneapolis West	Harriers		1946, 1947				
Minneapolis East (Co-op)							
Minneapolis West (Co-op)							
North Metro (co-op)	Stars						
Park Center	Pirates		1993				
Richfield	Spartans		1962, 1963, 1964, 1976, 1986, 1991	1991		1976	
Robbinsdale	Robins		1959				
Robbinsdale Armstrong	Falcons						
Robbinsdale Cooper	Hawks						
Rochester			1945, 1946, 1947, 1948				
Sacred Heart High School	Eagles						
Saint Agnes	Aggies	I	1949 (I), 1950 (I), 1951 (I), 1952 (I), 1953 (I), 1954 (I), 1956 (I), 1957 (I), 1958 (I), 1959 (I), 1960 (I), 1961 (I), 1965 (I), 1966 (I), 1967 (I), 1968 (I)		1967 (I)	1968 (I)	
Saint Bernard	Bulldogs	I	1964 (I), 1965 (I), 1966 (I), 1967 (I), 1968 (I), 1969 (I)	1967 (I)	1968 (I)	1966 (I)	
Saint Cloud Apollo	Eagles	A	1984, 2013, 2015				
Saint Cloud Tech	Tigers	AA	1945, 1946, 1947, 1948, 1950, 1951, 1952	1946	1948		
Saint Paul Central	Minutemen						
Saint Paul Como Park	Cougars	AA					
Saint Paul Harding	Knights	AA	1948, 1954, 1958, 1969, 1972, 1974, 1979	1948, 1954		1958	
Saint Paul Humboldt	Indians/Hawks		1952, 1953				
Saint Paul Mechanic Arts	Trainers						
Saint Paul Monroe	Green Wave		1962				
Saint Paul Murray	Pilots		1949, 1950, 1951, 1957, 1958, 1963	1951	1950		
Saint Paul Saints (co-op)							
Saint Paul Washington	Prexies		1945, 1956, 1960		1945	1960	
Silver Bay (William Kelley)	Mariners		1999				
Sleepy Eye	Indians	A					
Staples	Cardinals		1945				
Two Harbors	Agates						
Virginia-Mountain Iron-Buhl	Blue Devils	A	2005, 2009, 2010				
Walker-Hackensack-Akely	Wolves						
White Bear Mariner	Dolphins		1982			1982	
Williams	Wolves		1949, 1950			1949, 1950	

== Championship games ==
Legend for "Championship Games" Tables Below
Indicator	Meaning
*	Game was decided in an overtime period
**	Game was decided in two overtime periods
***	Game was decided in three overtime periods
Record	Win–loss–tie record after championship game

Single Class/Tier I/Class AA Championship Games
Year	Record	Champion	Score	Runner-up	Record	Third Place	Consolation
1945	11-0	Eveleth	4–3	Thief River Falls		St. Paul Washington	White Bear Lake
1946	23-4	Roseau	6–0	Rochester		Eveleth	St. Cloud
1947	34-1	St. Paul Johnson	2–1	Roseau		Minneapolis West	South St. Paul
1948	15-0	Eveleth	8–2	Warroad		St. Cloud	St. Paul Harding
1949	13-0	Eveleth	4–1	Williams		Warroad	Minneapolis Washburn
1950	22-0	Eveleth	4–3	Williams		St. Paul Murray	International Falls
1951	19-0	Eveleth	4–1	St. Paul Johnson		Thief River Falls	St. Paul Murray
1952	12-2	Hibbing	4–3	Eveleth		Minneapolis Southwest	Thief River Falls
1953	29-2	St. Paul Johnson	4–1	Warroad		Eveleth	St. Paul Humboldt
1954	20-0	Thief River Falls	4–1	Eveleth		St. Paul Johnson	St. Paul Harding
1955	26-1-2	St. Paul Johnson	3–1	Minneapolis Southwest		South St. Paul	Thief River Falls
1956	19-1	Thief River Falls	3–2	International Falls		Eveleth	St. Paul Johnson
1957	23-2	International Falls	3–1	Roseau	19–4–1	Minneapolis South	Edina Morningside
1958	22-4-1	Roseau	1–0	St. Paul Harding	13–7–2	South St. Paul	Minneapolis Roosevelt
1959	30-0	Roseau	4–2	Minneapolis Washburn	12–6	International Falls	Thief River Falls
1960	23-3	Duluth East	3–1	St. Paul Washington	11–4	Minneapolis Camden (as Patrick Henry)	Minneapolis Roosevelt
1961	21-3-2	Roseau	1-0	South St. Paul	17-2-2	Duluth East	St. Paul Johnson
1962	23-2-1	International Falls	4–0	Roseau	19–2–1	South St. Paul	Edina Morningside
1963	24-2-1	St. Paul Johnson	4–3*	International Falls	19–0–2	Roseau	Roseville-Alexander Ramsey
1964	22-3-1	International Falls	7–3	St. Paul Johnson	20–0–1	Minneapolis Camden (as Patrick Henry)	Roseau
1965	26-0	International Falls	7–0	Bloomington Lincoln	8–8–4	St. Paul Johnson	Roseville-Alexander Ramsey
1966	26–0	International Falls	5–0	Roseau	18–3–1	South St. Paul	Greenway of Coleraine
1967	20-4-2	Greenway of Coleraine	4–2	St. Paul Johnson	21–0	Hibbing	Roseau
1968	23-3	Greenway of Coleraine	6–1	South St. Paul	15–6–1	St. Paul Johnson	Roseau
1969	26–1	Edina	5–4*	Warroad	18–3	South St. Paul	Greenway of Coleraine
1970	24-0-1	Minneapolis Southwest	1–0*	Edina	21–0–1	Hibbing	North St. Paul
1971	22–2–3	Edina	1–0	Roseau	19–3	International Falls	Hastings
1972	22–3–1	International Falls	3–2	Grand Rapids	20–7	Minneapolis Southwest	Edina
1973	21–4–2	Hibbing	6–3	Roseville Alexander Ramsey	16–10	International Falls	Minneapolis Southwest
1974	23–0	Edina East	6–0	Bemidji	19–1–3	Grand Rapids	Hibbing
1975	23–4	Grand Rapids	6–1	Minneapolis Southwest	21–5	Hill-Murray	Duluth East
1976	22-5	Grand Rapids	4–3	Richfield		Hill-Murray	Bloomington Kennedy
1977	25–2	Rochester John Marshall	4–2	Edina East	24–1	Grand Rapids	Hill-Murray
1978	25–1	Edina East	5–4**	Grand Rapids	19–3–2	Roseau	Hill-Murray
1979	22–4	Edina East	4–3*	Rochester John Marshall	21–4–1	Roseau	Grand Rapids
1980	21–5	Grand Rapids	2–1	Hill–Murray	27–0	Bloomington Jefferson	Irondale
1981	17–8–1	Bloomington Jefferson	3–2	Irondale	20–6	South St. Paul	Grand Rapids
1982	22–4	Edina	6–0	White Bear Mariner	22–4–1	Hibbing	Cloquet
1983	28–0	Hill–Murray	4–3	Burnsville	20–5–1	Henry Sibley	Edina
1984	21–4–1	Edina	4–2	Bloomington–Kennedy	16–8–1	Hibbing	Roseau
1985	24–1–1	Burnsville	4–3	Hill–Murray	21–4–1	Anoka	Hibbing
1986	20–5–1	Burnsville	4–1	Hill–Murray	24–2	Duluth Denfeld	Bemidji
1987	25–1	Bloomington Kennedy	4–1	Burnsville	19–6	Greenway of Coleraine	South St. Paul
1988	21–5–1	Edina	5–3	Hill–Murray	22–5	Bloomington Jefferson	Duluth Denfeld
1989	25–3	Bloomington Jefferson	5–4*	Rochester John Marshall	23–4–1	Duluth Denfeld	Edina
1990	26–2	Roseau	3–1	Grand Rapids	26–1	Minnetonka	White Bear Lake
1991	23–6	Hill–Murray	5–3	Duluth East	22–6	Burnsville	Richfield
1992	25–2–2	Bloomington Jefferson	6–3	Moorhead	24–3	Blaine	Apple Valley
1993	28–0	Bloomington Jefferson	4–0	Hill–Murray	23–3	Moorhead	Cloquet/Esko/Carlton
1994	28-0	Bloomington Jefferson	3–1	Moorhead	25–2	Duluth East	White Bear Lake
1995	25–3	Duluth East	5–3	Moorhead	24–3	Edina	Bloomington Jefferson
1996	27–1	Apple Valley	3–2	Edina	18–7–2	Duluth East	Alexandria
1997	25–3	Edina	1–0	Duluth East	26–0–1	Moorhead	Anoka
1998	25–3	Duluth East	3–1	Anoka	22–3–2	Bloomington Jefferson	Hastings
1999	27–1	Roseau	4–0	Hastings	23–4	Elk River Area	Blaine
2000	21–5–2	Blaine	6–0	Duluth East	23–4	Hastings	Roseau
2001	29–1–1	Elk River Area	8–1	Moorhead	22–6–1	Greenway of Coleraine	Eastview
2002	26–4–1	Academy of Holy Angels	4–2	Hill–Murray	23–5–2	Roseville/St. Anthony Village	Elk River Area
2003	25–4–1	Anoka	3–1	Roseville	25–3–2	Academy of Holy Angels	White Bear Lake Area
2004	30–1	Centennial	1–0	Moorhead	26–2	Duluth East	Academy of Holy Angels
2005	26-3-1	Academy of Holy Angels	6–4	Moorhead	25–2–2	Duluth East	White Bear Lake
2006	27–4	Cretin–Derham Hall	7–0	Grand Rapids	21–8	Blaine	Minnetonka
2007	28–2	Roseau	5–1	Grand Rapids	19–7–4	Rochester Century	Edina
2008	27–3–1	Hill–Murray	3–0	Edina	28–2	Benilde-St. Margaret's	Woodbury
2009	28–3	Eden Prairie	3–0	Moorhead	17–9–3	Blaine	Edina
2010	23–6–2	Edina	4–2	Minnetonka	27–1–2	Hill-Murray	Duluth East
2011	23–5–2	Eden Prairie	3–2***	Duluth East	24–5	Eagan	Lakeville North
2012	25–6	Benilde–St. Margaret's	5–1	Hill–Murray	24–6	Lakeville South	Duluth East
2013	25–6	Edina	4–2	Hill–Murray	27–2–1	Duluth East	Moorhead
2014	25–4–1	Edina	8–2	Lakeville North	20–4–1	Eagan	Roseau
2015	31–0	Lakeville North	4–1	Duluth East	16–10–4	Edina	St. Thomas Academy
2016	22–8–1	Wayzata	5–3	Eden Prairie	18–8–2	Grand Rapids	Bemidji
2017	23–7–1	Grand Rapids	6–3	Moorhead	19–4–3	Eden Prairie	St. Thomas Academy
2018	24-2-2	Minnetonka	5-2	Duluth East	22-2-3	Edina	St. Thomas Academy
2019	27-2-1	Edina	3-2*	Eden Prairie	19-10-2	Blaine	Duluth East
2020	22-6-3	Hill-Murray	4-1	Eden Prairie	24-6-1	The Blake School	Andover
2021	21-1-2	Eden Prairie	2-1**	Lakeville South	20-1-2	Maple Grove and Wayzata	Not contested
2022	23-5-1	Andover	6-5**	Maple Grove	21-7-1	Hill-Murray	Edina
2023	29-2	Minnetonka	2-1	Edina	22-7-1	Andover	Hill-Murray
2024	26–4–1	Edina	2-1	Chanhassen	25-6	Cretin-Derham Hall	Centennial
2025	28-2-1	Moorhead	7-6	Stillwater	24-7	Edina	Shakopee
2026	27-3-1	Moorhead	5-4**	Minnetonka	26-3-2	Rosemount	Grand Rapids

Tier II/Class A Championship Games
Year	Record	Champion	Score	Runner-up	Record	Third Place	Consolation
1992	16–12	Greenway of Coleraine	6–1	Rosemount	6–20–1	Orono	Minneapolis Roosevelt
1993	14–14	Eveleth	3–2*	Lake Of The Woods	19–7	Henry Sibley	Orono
1994	24–4	Warroad	5–3	Hibbing	20–7	Mahtomedi	Minneapolis Edison
1995	20–7–1	International Falls	3–2	Totino-Grace	26–1	Warroad	Hutchinson
1996	24–4	Warroad	10–3	Red Wing	24–3	Breck School	Simley
1997	28–0	Red Wing	4–3	Warroad	23–4	Proctor	Breck School
1998	22–6	Eveleth	4–2	Hermantown	22–4–1	Red Wing	East Grand Forks
1999	26–2	Benilde–St. Margaret's	4–2	East Grand Forks	16–10–2	Fergus Falls	St. Thomas Academy
2000	24–3–1	Breck	3–2	Warroad	21–5–2	International Falls	Farmington
2001	22–9	Benilde–St. Margaret's	2–1	Rochester Lourdes	24–5	Hermantown	East Grand Forks
2002	27–2–1	Totino-Grace	3–2	Red Wing	24–5–1	Rochester Lourdes/Plainview	East Grand Forks
2003	28-1-1	Warroad	3–1	Simley	19–10–1	Orono	Hibbing
2004	28–1–2	Breck	7–2	Orono	26–3–1	Hibbing	Warroad
2005	26–0–2	Warroad	4–3**	Totino-Grace	27–3	Duluth Marshall	Albert Lea
2006	24–5–1	St. Thomas Academy	4–3	Duluth Marshall	27–1–1	Hermantown	The Blake School
2007	29-0-1	Hermantown	4–1	Duluth Marshall	24–4–2	St. Thomas Academy	Orono
2008	26–5	St. Thomas Academy	5–1	Duluth Marshall	25–5	Warroad	Little Falls
2009	27–3–1	Breck	7–3	Warroad	28–2	Little Falls	Rochester Lourdes
2010	28–2	Breck	2–1	Hermantown	27–3	Warroad	Rochester Lourdes
2011	24–6	St. Thomas Academy	5–4*	Hermantown	25–3–2	Thief River Falls	Rochester Lourdes
2012	26–4	St. Thomas Academy	5–1	Hermantown	30–0	Breck School	Little Falls
2013	27–2–2	St. Thomas Academy	5–4	Hermantown	25–4–1	Breck School	Duluth Marshall
2014	28–2–1	East Grand Forks	7–3	Hermantown	18–4–2	New Prague	Totino-Grace
2015	26-4	East Grand Forks	5–4*	Hermantown	27–3–1	Mahtomedi	New Prague
2016	27–2–1	Hermantown	5–0	Breck	23–4–1	Thief River Falls	St. Cloud Cathedral
2017	29–1–1	Hermantown	4–3**	Monticello	21–6–1	St. Cloud Cathedral	Delano
2018	20-7-1	Orono	2-1	Alexandria	16-10-1	Hermantown	Thief River Falls
2019	26-4	St. Cloud Cathedral	5-2	Greenway/Nashwauk-Keewatin	17-13	Mahtomedi	Delano
2020	23-8	Mahtomedi	3-2*	Hermantown	23-4-4	St. Cloud Cathedral	Delano
2021	19-0-0	Gentry Academy	8-1	Dodge County	19-4-1	East Grand Forks and Little Falls	Not contested
2022	28-2	Hermantown	3-2	Warroad	26-3-1	Mahtomedi	Minneapolis
2023	23-8	Mahtomedi	6-5**	Warroad	29-1-1	Hermantown	St. Cloud Cathedral
2024	26-4-1	St. Cloud Cathedral	3-1	Hermantown	20-9-2	Warroad	Orono
2025	15-13-2	East Grand Forks	2-1*	St. Cloud Cathedral	20-9-2	Orono	Northfield
2026	25-5-1	Warroad	5-4*	Hibbing/Chisholm	26-3-2	Mahtomedi	St. Cloud Cathedral

Minnesota Prep School Tournament(1949-1964)/State Catholic School Tournament (1965-9)/State Independent Tournament (1970-4)
Year	Champion	Score	Runner-up	Third Place	Consolation
1949	Cretin	5-3	St. Thomas Academy	Not Played	Not Played
1950	Cretin	7-1	The Blake School	Not Played	Not Played
1951	St. Thomas Academy	5-3	Cretin	Not Played	Not Played
1952	Cretin	6-1	St. Thomas Academy	Not Played	Not Played
1953	Cretin	7-3	St. Paul Academy	Not Played	Not Played
1954	Cretin	2-1*	Minnehaha Academy	Not Played	Not Played
1955	St. Thomas Academy	6-1	Breck School	Not Played	Not Played
1956	Cretin	4-2	The Blake School	Not Played	Not Played
1957	Cretin	5-1	Minnehaha Academy	Not Played	Not Played
1958	Cretin	6-2	St. Thomas Academy	Not Played	Not Played
1959	Cretin	3-2*	Breck School	The Blake School	Not Played
1960	Cretin	8-3	Minnehaha Academy	De La Salle	Not Played
1961	St. Paul Academy	2-1	Cretin	Minnehaha Academy	The Blake School
1962	St. Paul Academy	5-1	The Blake School	Minnehaha Academy	Cretin
1963	Cretin	9-2	St. Paul Academy	The Blake School	Not Played
1964	The Blake School	4-2	Hill	Cretin	Not Played
1965	Duluth Cathedral	3-2*	Hill	Not Played	Not Played
1966	Duluth Cathedral	9-0	St. Bernard	Benilde	Hill
1967	Duluth Cathedral	4-2	Benilde	St. Agnes	St. Bernard
1968	Duluth Cathedral	4-3	St. Agnes	St. Bernard	Cretin
1969	Duluth Cathedral	6-1	Hill	Cretin	Not Played
1970	Hill	5-4*	Duluth Cathedral	The Blake School	St. Thomas Academy
1971	The Blake School	4-2	Hill	Benilde	Duluth Cathedral
1972	Hill-Murray	3-2	Duluth Cathedral	Archbishop Brady	The Blake School
1973	The Blake School	5-3	Cretin	Hill-Murray	St. Paul Academy and Summit School
1974	St. Paul Academy and Summit School	2-1	Hill-Murray	The Blake School	Duluth Cathedral

== List of state champions ==
List of Single Class/Tier I/Class AA Champions
Rank	School	Championships	Last
1	Edina	14	2024
2	Roseau	7	2007
3	International Falls	6	1972
4	Eveleth	5	1951
4	Bloomington Jefferson	5	1994
6	Hill-Murray	4	2020
6	St. Paul Johnson	4	1963
6	Grand Rapids	4	2017
9	Duluth East	3	1998
9	Eden Prairie	3	2021
11	Thief River Falls	2	1956
11	Greenway	2	1968
11	Hibbing	2	1973
11	Burnsville	2	1986
11	Holy Angels	2	2005
11	Minnetonka	2	2023
11	Moorhead	2	2026
18	Minneapolis Southwest	1	1970
18	Rochester John Marshall	1	1977
18	Bloomington Kennedy	1	1987
18	Apple Valley	1	1996
18	Blaine	1	2000
18	Elk River	1	2001
18	Anoka	1	2003
18	Centennial	1	2004
18	Cretin-Derham Hall	1	2006
18	Benilde-St. Margaret's	1	2012
18	Lakeville North	1	2015
18	Wayzata	1	2016
18	Andover	1	2022

List of Tier II/Class A Champions
Rank	School	Championships	Last
1	St. Thomas Academy	5	2013
1	Warroad	5	2026
3	Breck	4	2010
3	Hermantown	4	2022
6	East Grand Forks	3	2025
7	Eveleth-Gilbert	2	1998
7	Benilde-St. Margaret's	2	2001
7	Mahtomedi	2	2023
7	St. Cloud Cathedral	2	2024
10	Greenway	1	1992
10	International Falls	1	1995
10	Red Wing	1	1997
10	Totino Grace	1	2002
10	Orono	1	2018
10	Gentry Academy	1	2021

Minnesota Prep School Tournament(1949-1964)/State Catholic School Tournament (1965-9)/State Independent Tournament (1970-4)
Rank	School	Championships	Last
1	Cretin	11	1963
2	Duluth Cathedral	5	1969
3	The Blake School	3	1973
3	Saint Paul Academy	3	1974
5	Hill-Murray	2	1972

== Notable alumni ==
List of notable alumni:

- Wendell Anderson (Saint Paul Johnson) former Governor of Minnesota (1971-76) and United States Senator (1976-8); Olympic silver medalist in 1956.
- Mike Antonovich (Greenway of Coleraine), former NHL player for the Minnesota North Stars, Hartford Whalers, and New Jersey Devils; Mayor of Coleraine, Minnesota
- David Backes (Spring Lake Park), NHL player for the Saint Louis Blues and Boston Bruins; two-time Olympian and silver medalist in 2010
- Bill Baker (Grand Rapids), former professional NHL player for the Montreal Canadiens, Colorado Rockies, Saint Louis Blues, and New York Rangers; Olympic gold medalist in 1980.
- Nick Bjugstad (Blaine), NHL player for the Minnesota Wild; nephew of Scott Bjugstad
- Scott Bjugstad (Irondale), former NHL player for the Minnesota North Stars, Pittsburgh Penguins, and Los Angeles Kings; one time Olympian in 1984; uncle of Nick Bjugstad
- Brandon Bochenski (Blaine), NHL and KHL player for the Ottawa Senators, Chicago Blackhawks, Boston Bruins, Anaheim Ducks, Nashville Predators, Tampa Bay Lightning, and Barys Astana; played internationally for Kazakhstan.
- Brian Bonin (White Bear Lake Area), former NHL player for the Pittsburgh Penguins and Minnesota Wild
- Henry Boucha (Warroad), former NHL player for the Detroit Red Wings, Minnesota North Stars, Kansas City Scouts, and Colorado Rockies; Olympian and silver medalist in 1972, second cousin of Gary Sargent and T. J. Oshie
- Justin Braun (White Bear Lake Area), NHL player for the San Jose Sharks
- Herb Brooks (Saint Paul Johnson), former Olympic, NHL, and NCAA coach; Olympic Gold (1980) and Silver (2002) medalist; three-time NCAA National Champion (1974, 1976, 1979).
- Aaron Broten (Roseau), former NHL player for the Colorado Rockies/New Jersey Devils, Minnesota North Stars, Quebec Nordiques, Toronto Maple Leafs, and Winnipeg Jets; brother of Neal Broten and Paul Broten.
- Neal Broten (Roseau), former NHL player for the Minnesota North Stars/Dallas Stars, New Jersey Devils, and Los Angeles Kings; NCAA champion in 1979. Olympic gold medalist in 1980; brother of Aaron Broten and Paul Broten.
- Paul Broten (Roseau), former NHL player for the New York Rangers, Dallas Stars, and St. Louis Blues; brother of Aaron Broten and Neal Broten
- Warren Burger (Saint Paul Johnson), Chief Justice of the Supreme Court of the United States, 1969-1986.
- Dave Christian (Warroad), former NHL player for the Winnipeg Jets, Washington Capitals, Boston Bruins, Saint Louis Blues, and Chicago Blackhawks; Olympic gold medalist in 1980, co-founder of Christian Brothers Hockey Co., uncle of Brock Nelson.
- Steve Christoff (Richfield), former NHL player for the Minnesota North Stars, Calgary Flames, and Los Angeles Kings; Olympic gold medalist in 1980.
- Mike Crowley (Bloomington Jefferson), former NHL player for the Mighty Ducks of Anaheim.
- Matt Cullen (Moorhead) NHL player for the Mighty Ducks of Anaheim, Florida Panthers, Carolina Hurricanes, New York Rangers, Ottawa Senators, Nashville Predators, and Pittsburgh Penguins; three-time Stanley Cup champion (2006, 2016, 2017).
- Mark Dayton (The Blake School), United States Senator (2001-2007) and Governor of Minnesota (2011–2019).
- François-Henri Désérable (Wayzata), French author.
- Jake Gardiner (Minnetonka), NHL player for the Toronto Maple Leafs.
- Phil Housley (South Saint Paul), former NHL player for the Buffalo Sabres, Winnipeg Jets, St. Louis Blues, Calgary Flames, New Jersey Devils, Washington Capitals, Chicago Blackhawks, and Toronto Maple Leafs; coach of the Buffalo Sabres.
- Matt Hendricks (Blaine), NHL player for the Winnipeg Jets, Colorado Avalanche, Washington Capitals, Nashville Predators and the Edmonton Oilers
- Steve Janaszak (Hill-Murray), former NHL player for the Minnesota North Stars and Colorado Rockies; Olympic gold medalist in 1980.
- Jim Johannson (Mayo High School), American ice hockey player, coach and USA Hockey executive.
- Jamie Langenbrunner (Cloquet), former NHL player for the Dallas Stars, New Jersey Devils, and St. Louis Blues; two-time Stanley Cup champion in 1999 and 2003.
- Reed Larson (Minneapolis Roosevelt)
- Nick Leddy (Eden Prairie)
- Anders Lee (Saint Thomas, Edina)
- Brian Lee (Moorhead)
- Paul Martin (Elk River Area)
- John Mayasich (Eveleth)
- Rob McClanahan (Mounds View)
- Ryan McDonagh (Cretin-Derham)
- Casey Mittelstadt (Eden Prairie)
- Brock Nelson (Warroad)
- Craig Norwich (Edina)
- T. J. Oshie (Warroad)
- Mark Parrish (Bloomington Jefferson)
- George Pelawa (Bemidji)
- Matt Peterson (Maple Grove)
- Mike Ramsey (Minneapolis Roosevelt)
- Tim Pawlenty (South Saint Paul), Governor of Minnesota (2003-2011) and 2012 candidate for President
- Dean Phillips (The Blake School), U.S. Representative (2019-2025). 2024 candidate for President.
- John Pohl (Red Wing)
- Tom Preissing (Rosemount)
- Gary Sargent (Bemidji), former NHL player for the Los Angeles Kings and Minnesota North Stars; second cousin of Henry Boucha and first cousin of T. J. Oshie
- Pete Stauber (Duluth Denfeld), U.S. Representative (2019-)
- Alex Stalock (South Saint Paul)
- Terry Steinbach (New Ulm), former MLB player, three-time MLB All-Star and World Series champion in 1989
- David Tomassoni (Chisholm), former professional hockey player for Italian Men's National Team, Minnesota Senator and President of the Minnesota Senate (2020-21)
- Chris Weinke (Cretin-Derham Hall), former professional football and baseball player; Heisman Trophy winner in 2000
- Blake Wheeler (Breck)
- Doug Woog (South Saint Paul)
- Doug Zmolek (Rochester Marshall)
- Russ Anderson (Minneapolis Washburn), (University of Minnesota - NCAA Champion 1976), NHL Pittsburgh Penguins, Hartford Whalers, Los Angeles Kings
