= Rum River Conference =

- Classification: MSHSL
- Founded: 1945
- Ceased: 2007
- No. of teams: 5 (at end)
- Region: Minnesota

The Rum River Conference was a high school athletics conference in central Minnesota. It was named after the Rum River, which flows through the region. The conference can be confirmed to have existed as early as 1945, and is rumored to have formed in the 1930s. The conference disbanded following the 2006–07 school year.

Mora High School and Milaca High School were among the original members, and both were with the conference through its final season. Foley High School was a member from 1969 to 2007, having joined from the West Central Conference. Foley, Mora, and Milaca all were placed in the West Central Conference following the break-up of the Rum River. Pine City High School departed for the Great River Conference. Zimmerman High School was the final member school for the conference's final season. North Branch Area High School and Chisago Lakes High School departed for the North Suburban Conference for the 2004–05 school year. Other previous conference members included Cambridge-Isanti High School, Elk River High School (Zimmerman took Elk River's place when the district split into three high schools, of which Zimmerman was one), Princeton High School, Braham Area High School, and Ogilvie High School. Sauk Rapids High School left the conference in 2001.
