= North Suburban Conference (Minnesota) =

The North Suburban Conference was a Minnesota State High School League recognized high school extracurricular conference including 11 schools located in the northern suburbs of the Twin Cities. The conference disbanded following the 2013-14 school year, after Chisago Lakes, St. Francis, and North Branch announced they would join the Mississippi 8 Conference and Robbinsdale Cooper and St. Louis Park left for the Metro West Conference.

== Schools as of 2013-14 ==
- Benilde-St. Margaret's Red Knights - Benilde-St. Margaret's School
- Chisago Lakes Wildcats - Chisago Lakes High School
- Columbia Heights Hylanders - Columbia Heights High School
- Fridley Tigers - Fridley High School
- Irondale Knights - Irondale High School
- North Branch Vikings - North Branch Area High School
- Robbinsdale Cooper Hawks - Robbinsdale Cooper High School
- Spring Lake Park Panthers - Spring Lake Park High School
- St. Francis Fighting Saints - St. Francis High School
- St. Louis Park Orioles - Saint Louis Park High School
- Totino-Grace Eagles - Totino-Grace High School

== Former members ==
- Buffalo Bison - Buffalo High School
- Cambridge-Isanti Bluejackets - Cambridge-Isanti High School
- Centennial Cougars - Centennial High School
- Monticello Magic - Monticello High School
- Coon Rapids Cardinals - Coon Rapids High School
- Anoka Tornadoes - Anoka High School
- Blaine Bengals - Blaine High School
- Ramsey Rams - Alexander Ramsey High School (closed in 1986)?
- Kellogg Chargers - Frank B. Kellogg High School (closed in 1986)
- Forest Lake Rangers - Forest Lake Area High School
- Roseville Raiders - Roseville Area High School
- Mounds View Mustangs- Mounds View High School
- Elk River Elks- Elk River High School
