= Big Lake High School =

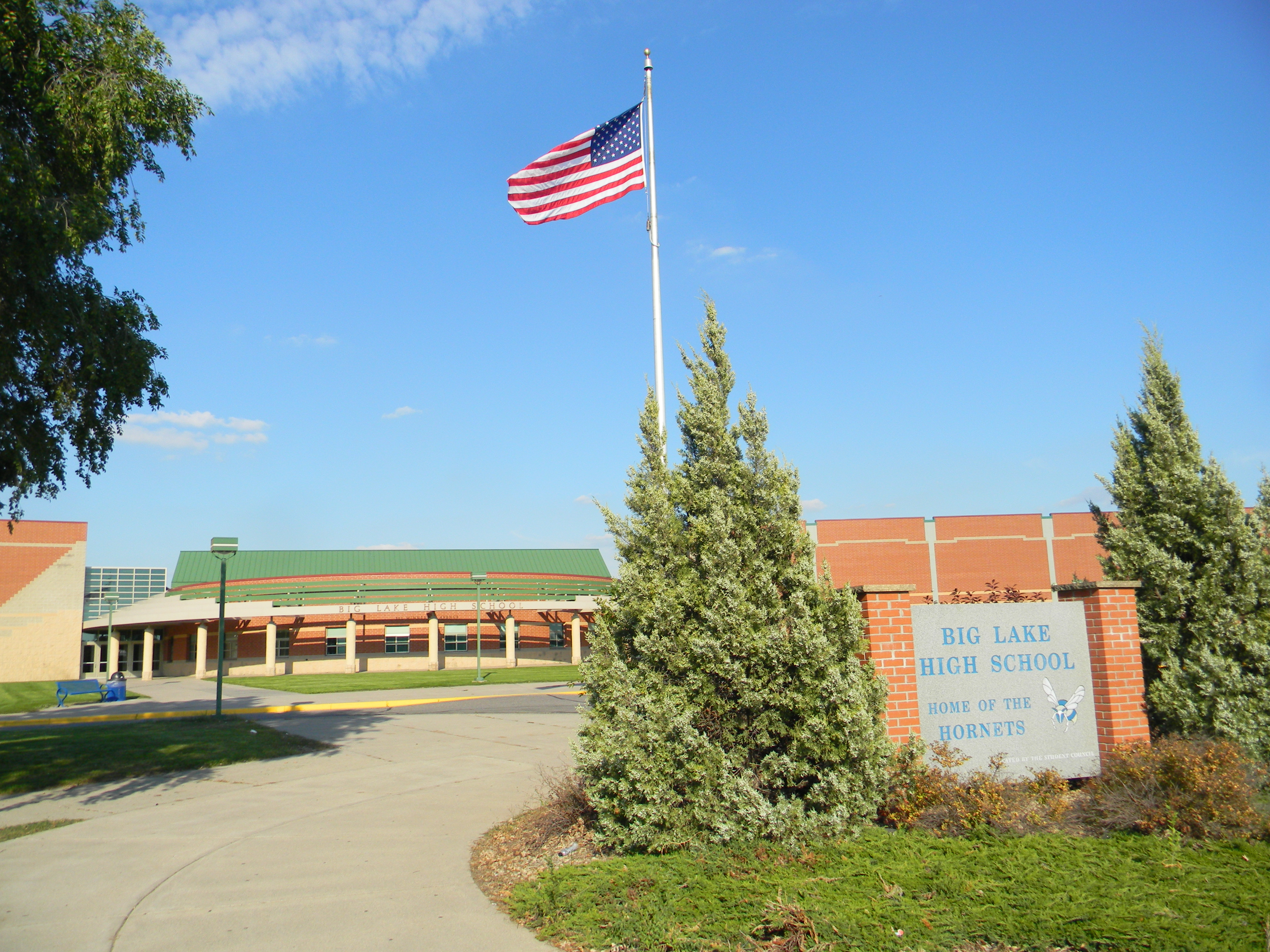

Location
- 501 Minnesota Ave; Big Lake, Minnesota 55309; United States of America; 45°20′24″N 93°44′19″W

Information
- Type: Public
- Established: 1917
- Principal: Robert Dockendorf
- Teaching staff: 45.92 (FTE)
- Grades: 9-12
- Enrollment: 902 (2024-2025)
- Student to teacher ratio: 19.64
- Campus: Suburban
- Colors: Blue & Gold
- Athletics: Mississippi 8 Conference
- Mascot: Buzz the Hornet
- Rivals: Monticello High School; Becker High School
- Song: You're a Grand Old Flag
- Website: https://www.biglakeschools.org/

Big Lake High School is a four-year public high school located in Big Lake, Minnesota. As of 2022, 951 students in grades 9-12 are enrolled. The school's principal is Robert Dockendorf and the assistant principal is Shallyn Tordeur. Big Lake High is part of the Big Lake Public School District 727, led by Superintendent Tim Truebenbach and Administrative Dean Jacob Klingelhutz. The district focuses on STEM education. The high school celebrated its centennial class in 2017.

As of 2022, Big Lake High School offers a variety of over 150 courses across 14 departments. Classes run on a trimester system. Included is a session time for students to meet with advisors, work on math/reading skills, and host school-wide assemblies.

Along with the many standard academic programs, Big Lake Schools partners with multiple outside groups to provide a larger range of options to explore their education. Starting their junior year, students are permitted to take college-level courses both on and off-campus. College in the Classroom (CIC) is a program allowing Big Lake staff to teach courses that grant students college credit. Students may also enroll in part or full-time PSEO programs, which allow students to learn on-campus at college campuses. Another option offered to students is taking courses through Wright Technical Center, an alternative school located in Buffalo, Minnesota.

Starting in the 2018–19 school year, Big Lake switched to a new classroom technology program, Otus. This program allows students to access their assignments, grades, and textbooks. With this implemented, students are no longer provided with paper copies of textbooks, but rather must access their Otus account to view ebooks. A One-to-One program, where all students are provided with a laptop, which began during the 2020–21 school year.

Big Lake's mascot is the "Hornet", its school song is a modified version of "You're a Grand Old Flag". Big Lake is a member of the Mississippi 8 Conference.

== Extracurricular ==
| Activity | Season | Notes |
|---|---|---|
| Jazz Band | Full Year | |
| Knowledge Bowl | Full Year | |
| One Act Play | Fall/Winter | |
| Pep Band | Fall/Winter | |
| Visual Arts | Full Year | |
| Musical | Spring | |
| Robotics | Full Year | |
| Math League | Winter/Spring | |
| DECA | Full Year | |
| Yearbook | Full Year | |
| Ski & Snowboard | Winter | |

Big Lake High School has a daily announcement TV program, "Live at the Hive", which operates under the student-run "Hornet Broadcasting Network". Students also have the opportunity to webcast events (sports, concerts, etc.) during and after school.

Other clubs at Big Lake High School include Diversity Club, National Honor Society, Student Council, and more.

== Athletics ==
| Sport | Season | Notes | State Competition Appearances (as of 2026) | State Titles |
|---|---|---|---|---|
| Baseball | Spring | | | |
| Boys' Basketball | Winter | | 2017 | |
| Boys' Soccer | Fall | | | |
| Boys' Swim & Dive | Winter | Co-Op with STMA | | |
| Boys' Tennis | Spring | | | |
| Cheerleading | Fall/Winter | | | |
| Concessions | Full Year | | | |
| Cross Country | Fall | "Pride and Tradition" | 1994, 1995, 1996, 1997, 1998, 1999, 2000 (11th), 2001, 2002, 2013 (7th), 2004, 2011, 2012, 2013, 2021 (CHAMPIONS), 2022 (3rd) | 1 (2021) |
| Dance Team | Winter | | 2002, 2003 | |
| Football | Fall | | | |
| Girls' Basketball | Winter | | | |
| Girls' Soccer | Fall | | | |
| Girls' Swim & Dive | Fall | | 1998, 1999, 2000, 2002, 2005, 2006, 2007, 2008, 2009, 2010, 2011, 2012, 2013 | |
| Girls' Tennis | Fall | | | |
| Golf | Spring | | 2008 | |
| Girls' Gymnastics | Winter | | 1990, 1991, 1993, 1994, 1995 (2nd), 1996 (2nd), 1997, 1999 (CHAMPIONS), 2000 (CHAMPIONS), 2002, 2003, 2004, 2005, 2006, 2007, 2008, 2009, 2010, 2011, 2012 (3rd), 2013, 2014, 2015, 2016, 2017, 2018, 2019, 2020 (CHAMPIONS), 2022 (3rd), 2023 (CHAMPIONS) | 4 (1999, 2000, 2020, 2023) |
| Hockey | Winter | Co-Op with Becker | | |
| Boys' Lacrosse | Spring | Start-up 2018, JV team only | | |
| Girls' Lacrosse | Spring | | | |
| Softball | Spring | | 2000 (2nd), 2001, 2002 (2nd), 2003, 2006, 2007 (4th), 2008, 2012, 2017 | |
| Track & Field | Spring | | 1981, 1982, 1990, 1996, 1997, 2000, 2001, 2002, 2003, 2007, 2010, 2011, 2012, 2013, 2022 (7th) | |
| Trapshooting | Spring | | 2022 (8th) | |
| Volleyball | Fall | | 2025 | |
| Wrestling | Winter | | 1995, 1996, 1997, 1998, 1999, 2000, 2001, 2002, 2003, 2004, 2005, 2006, 2007 (4th), 2008, 2009, 2010, 2011, 2020, 2023 | |

== Traditions/spirit ==
Big Lake High School's motto is the "Hornet Way", a policy that stresses Respect, Honesty, Kindness, Responsibility, and Fairness. Each month, a select number of students are awarded as a “Hornet Hero” by exemplifying such conduct.

Every year, Big Lake's Student Council coordinates events and activities that range from pep rallies to dress-up days. Notable traditions include the Homecoming and Sno-Daze Weeks, which incorporate dress-up days, assemblies, and student-elected senior royalty. Favorites of these weeks include the annual lip-sync battle, ping pong tournament, and talent show.

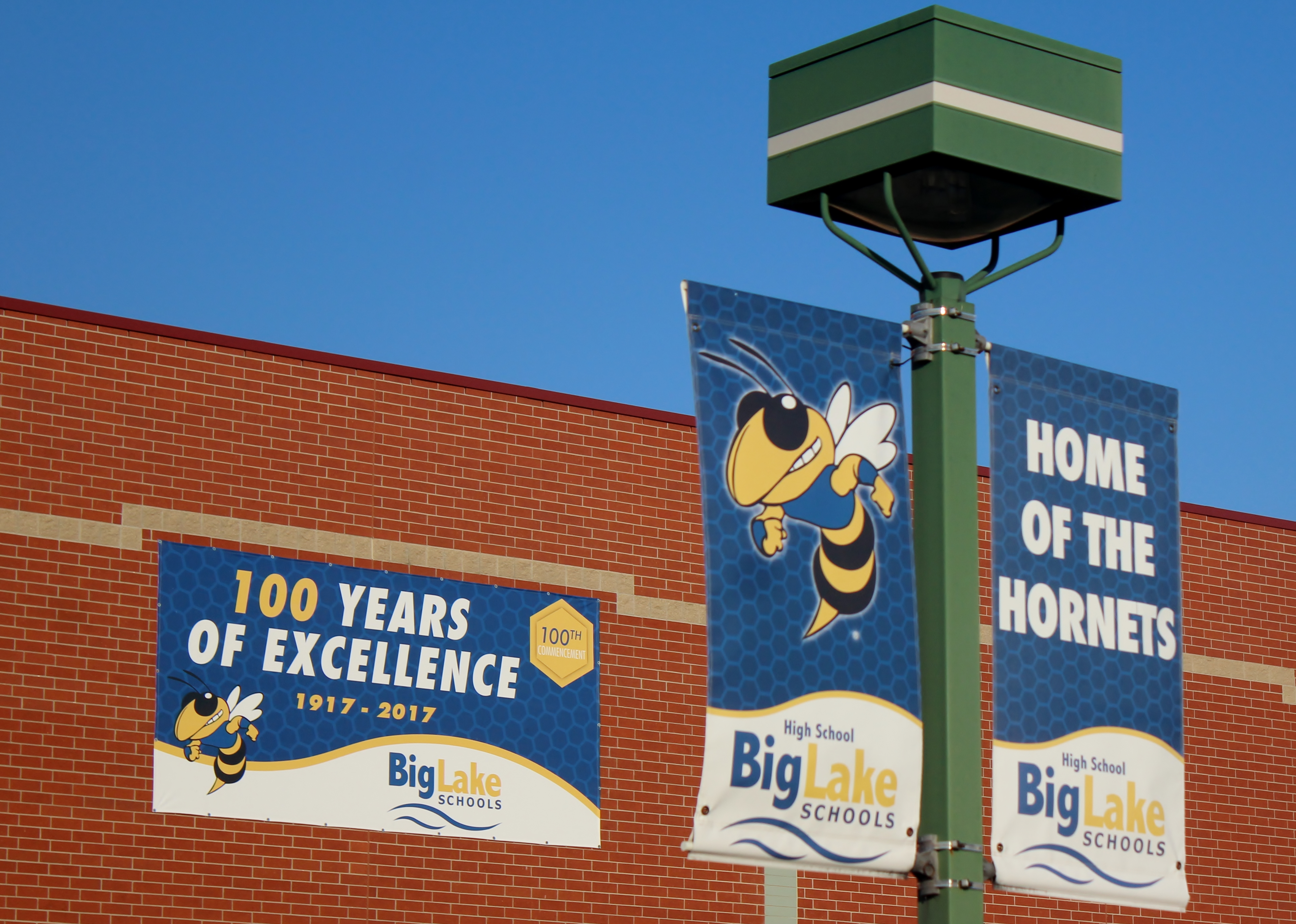
Big Lake High School celebrated its centennial class in 2017.

Big Lake's chapter of the National Honor Society hosts an annual "Lock-In" each spring. In order to attend, students must raise at least $25 in donations. Prizes are awarded to the top five contributors.

Around early May, Big Lake hosts its annual prom. This day-long tradition incorporates a grand march in the school gymnasium and a dance. In recent times, dances have been held primarily at a nearby bowling alley/arcade.
