= Monticello School District =

Monticello School District may refer to:

- Monticello School District, based in Monticello, Arkansas.
- Monticello Community Unified School District 25, based in Monticello, Illinois.
- Monticello Community School District, based in Monticello, Iowa.
- Monticello Independent Schools, based in Monticello, Kentucky.
- Monticello School District, based in Monticello, Minnesota.
- Monticello Central School District, based in Monticello, New York.
- Monticello School District, based in Monticello, Wisconsin.
