= North Suburban Conference =

North Suburban Conference may refer to:

- North Suburban Conference (Illinois)
- North Suburban Conference (Minnesota)
