= Treyton Welch =

American football player (born 2001)

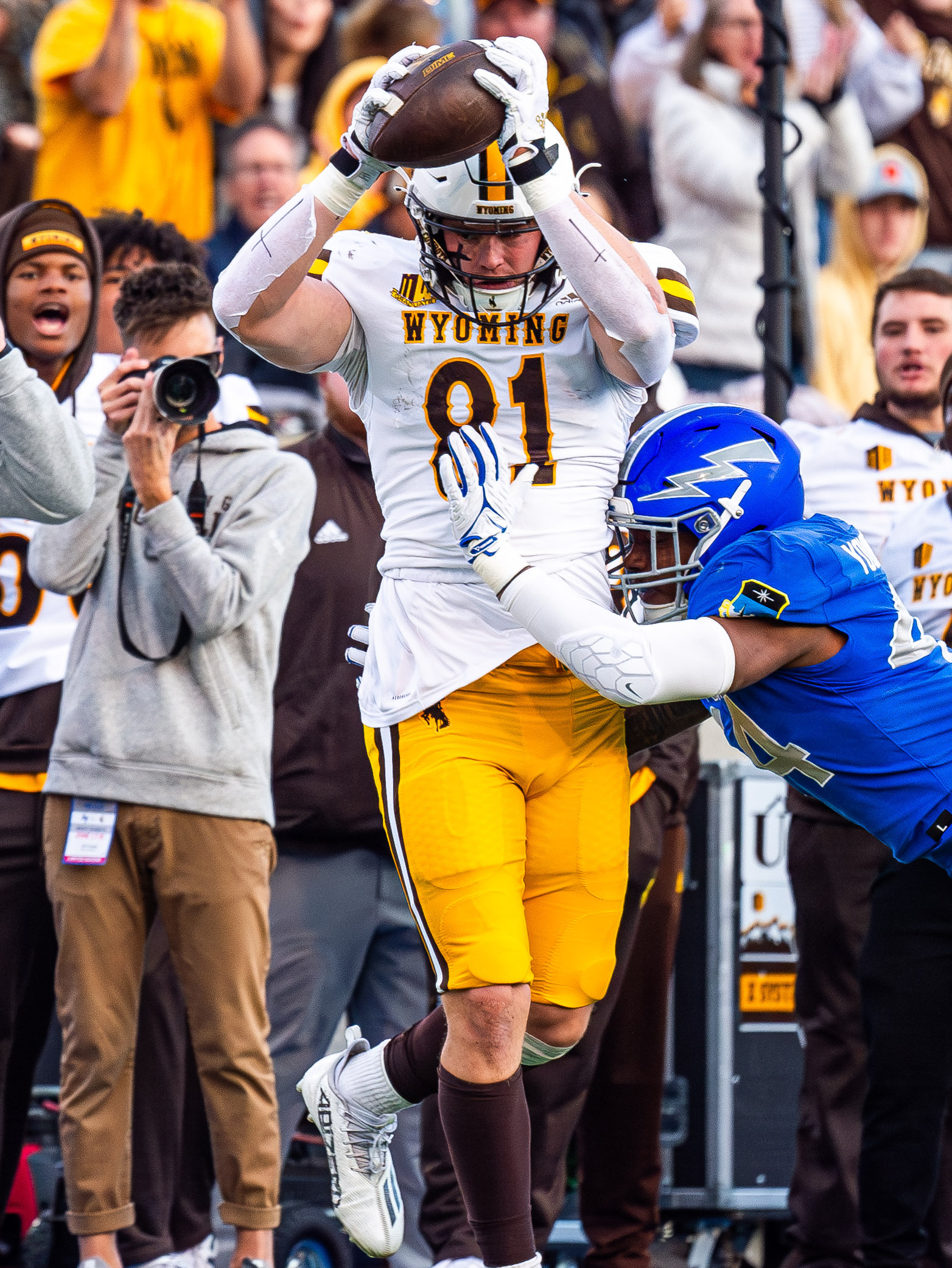
- Welch with Wyoming in 2023

No. 82 – New Orleans Saints
- Position: Tight end
- Roster status: Practice squad

Personal information
- Born: January 10, 2001 (age 25); Buffalo, Minnesota, U.S.
- Listed height: 6 ft 4 in (1.93 m)
- Listed weight: 240 lb (109 kg)

Career information
- High school: Buffalo
- College: Wyoming (2019–2023)
- NFL draft: 2024: undrafted

Career history
- Cleveland Browns (2024)*; New Orleans Saints (2024–present)
- * Offseason or practice squad member only

Career NFL statistics as of 2025
- Games played: 3
- Stats at Pro Football Reference

Treyton Welch (born January 10, 2001) is an American professional football tight end for the New Orleans Saints of the National Football League (NFL). He played college football for the Wyoming Cowboys.

== Early life ==
Welch grew up in Buffalo, Minnesota and attended Buffalo High School, where he lettered in football, hockey, lacrosse and track & field. During his senior season, he led the team and state of Minnesota with 1,032 receiving yards, 13 touchdown receptions which ranked second in the state and 60 receptions which ranked third. He was a three-star rated recruit and committed to play college football at the University of Wyoming over offers from Brown, North Dakota State, Northern Iowa and Western Illinois.

== College career ==
During Welch's true freshman season in 2019, he appeared in seven games and started one of them. During the 2020 season, he appeared in all six games and started five of them. He finished the season with five catches for 95 yards, averaging 19 yards per reception. During the 2021 season, he played in all 12 games and started 11 of them. He finished the season with 19 catches for 163 yards and two touchdowns, averaging 8.6 yards per reception. During the 2022 season, he played in and started all 12 games, finishing the season with 22 catches for 308 yards and five touchdowns, averaging 14 yards per reception. He also made one solo tackle. During the 2023 season, he played in all 13 games and started 10 of them, finishing the season with 31 catches for 308 yards and two touchdowns, averaging 9.9 yards per reception.

== Professional career ==
Pre-draft measurables
Height	Weight	Arm length	Hand span	Wingspan	40-yard dash	10-yard split	20-yard split	20-yard shuttle	Three-cone drill	Vertical jump	Broad jump	Bench press
6 ft 3 1/2 in (1.92 m)	241 lb (109 kg)	33 3/8 in (0.85 m)	10 1/8 in (0.26 m)	6 ft 8 1/2 in (2.04 m)	4.65 s	1.66 s	2.72 s	4.25 s	7.13 s	34 in (0.86 m)	10 ft 3 in (3.12 m)	25 reps
All values from Pro Day

=== Cleveland Browns ===
Welch signed with the Cleveland Browns as an undrafted free agent on May 10, 2024. He was waived by the Browns on August 27.

=== New Orleans Saints ===
On August 29, 2024, Welch was signed to the New Orleans Saints' practice squad. He signed a reserve/future contract with New Orleans on January 6, 2025.

On August 26, 2025, Welch was waived by the Saints as part of final roster cuts and re-signed to the practice squad the next day. He was promoted to the active roster on January 3, 2026.

On August 31, 2026, Welch was waived by the Saints. On September 1, New Orleans re–signed Welch to their practice squad. On September 12, he was signed to the team's active roster. He was waived on November 7 and re-signed to the practice squad three days later.
