= Mississippi 8 Conference =

High school athletic conference in Minnesota

- Conference: MSHSL
- Founded: 2004
- No. of teams: 8
- Region: Minnesota
- Official website: www.mississippi8.org

Locations
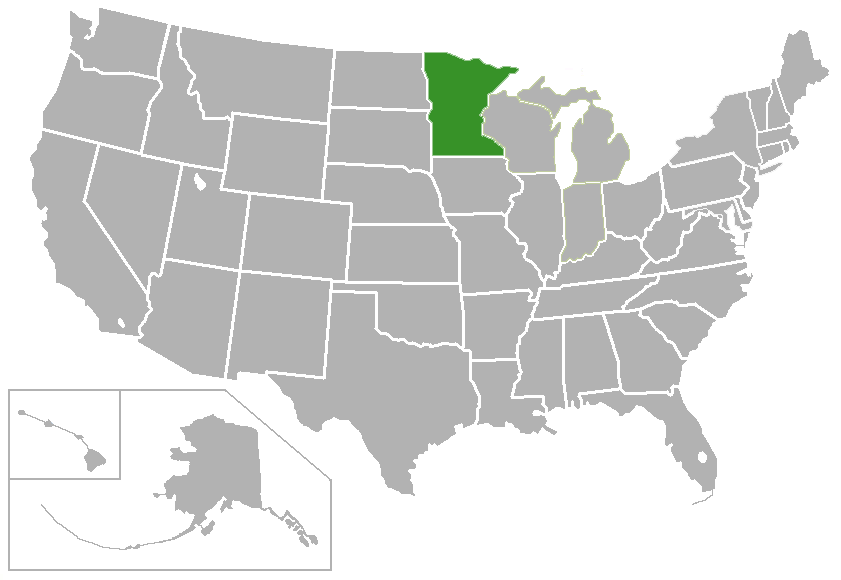

The Mississippi 8 Conference (M8) is a high school athletic and activities conference in the Twin Cities area in Central Minnesota with 8 member high schools. The conference derives its name from 6 of the original 8 member schools being located within 10 miles from the Mississippi River.

== History ==
The M8 was formed in 2004 with eight charter members: Becker, Big Lake, Buffalo, Cambridge-Isanti, Monticello, Princeton, Rogers and St. Michael-Albertville (STMA), and began play in the 2005-2006 school year. Zimmerman High School was added to the conference in 2008.

Elk River High School entered the M8 as a competitor in the sport of football in 2010 and Duluth East and Duluth Denfeld High Schools joined the conference for football in the fall of 2012. St. Francis, Chisago Lakes Area, and North Branch Area High School began competing in the Mississippi 8 Conference during 2013-14 school year.

Princeton School District and Zimmerman High School voted to withdraw their participation from the Mississippi 8 in favor of a new conference, Granite Ridge Conference, for the 2011 school year. Becker School District, and Elk River High School left the conference in 2012, Becker joined the Granite Ridge Conference, and Elk River High School football rejoined the Northwest Suburban Conference. In the 2013-14 school year, Princeton rejoined the M8. In 2018 STMA and Buffalo decided to leave the conference and were placed in the Lake Conference by the MSHSL and Rogers decided to leave for the Northwest Suburban Conference beginning in the Fall of 2019. Becker High School rejoined the conference in 2019 bringing the total number of schools back to 8.

== Members ==
The conference currently consists of 8 member schools.

School	Location	Established	Joined	Enrollment	Nickname	Colors
Becker High School	Becker, MN		2004 and 2019	821	Bulldogs	
Big Lake High School	Big Lake, MN	1917	2004	798	Hornets	
Cambridge-Isanti High School	Cambridge, MN	1869	2004	1,390	Blue Jackets	
Chisago Lakes High School	Lindstrom, MN	1943	2013	962	Wildcats	
Monticello High School	Monticello, MN		2004	1,177	Magic	
North Branch High School	North Branch, MN	1932	2013	712	Vikings	
Princeton High School	Princeton, MN		2004 and 2013	826	Tigers	
Saint Francis High School	St. Francis, MN	1914	2013	1,019	Saints	
Zimmerman High School	Zimmerman, MN	2003		644	Thunder	

== Former members ==
School	Location	Established	Nickname	Joined	Left	New Conference
Buffalo High School	Buffalo, MN		Bison	2004	2019	Lake
Rogers High School	Rogers, MN	2003	Royals	2004	2019	Northwest Suburban
St. Michael-Albertville High School	St. Michael, MN	1966	Knights	2004	2019	Lake

== Fall sports ==
=== Cross country ===
Boys Team	Championships	Years won
Buffalo*	6	2006, 2011, 2012, 2016, 2017, 2018
STMA*	4	2007, 2013, 2014, 2015
Big Lake	4	2020, 2021, 2022, 2023
Monticello	2	2005, 2010
Cambridge-Isanti	2	2008, 2009
Becker	2	2024, 2025
Princeton	1	2019

Girls Team	Championships	Years won
Monticello	7	2008, 2009, 2010, 2011, 2012, 2013, 2020
STMA*	6	2006, 2014, 2015, 2016, 2017, 2018
Becker	6	2005, 2007, 2019, 2021, 2022, 2025
Chisago Lakes	2	2023, 2024

- * No longer a member

The inaugural Cross Country Championship meet was held at Pebble Creek Golf Course in Becker. The 2006 meet was held at Liberty Elementary in Big Lake. The 2007 and 2014 meets were held at Buffalo Heights Golf Course. In 2008 the meet was held at Grandy 9 Golf Course in Cambridge. The 2009 and 2017 meets were hosted my Monticello at Vintage Golf Course and Lake Bertram Regional Park, respectively. 2010 meet was at the Princeton Golf Course. In 2011 Rogers hosted the meet at Fox Hollow Golf Course. The 2012 conference meet was held at St. Michael Rec Center. In 2013 and 2019 the meet was held at Ponds Golf Course and was hosted by St. Francis. In 2015 the meet was held at Isanti Middle School. Ki-Chi-Soga Park in Lindstrom was home to the 2016 meet.

=== Football ===
Team	Championships	Years won
Rogers	3	2010, 2011
Becker	3	2005, 2006, 2008
STMA	2	2007, 2013c, 2014c
Monticello	2	2012, 2014c
Chisago Lakes	2	2013c, 2014c
Buffalo	1	2009
Princeton	1	2014c

- c = Co-champions

After the 2014 football season schools in the state of Minnesota were placed into one of 18 districts. The purpose of the changes was to reduce scheduling headaches for several schools. All of the schools in the Mississippi 8 Conference were placed into the North Central District for the 2015 season. Prior to the 2017 season STMA was reclassified to 6A, as a result the school plays in the Metro District and North Branch was moved to the Northeast District. The other schools continue to play in the North Central District.

=== Soccer ===
Boys Team	Championships	Years won
Monticello	12	2005, 2006, 2007, 2008c, 2009, 2016, 2018, 2019c, 2020, 2023, 2024c, 2025
Rogers*	3	2010, 2013c, 2015
Chisago Lakes	3	2013c, 2017, 2019c
Buffalo*	2	2008c, 2014
STMA*	2	2011, 2012
St Francis	2	2019c, 2022
Princeton	2	2021, 2024c

Girls Team	Championships	Years won
STMA*	8	2007, 2008, 2011, 2012, 2014c, 2016, 2017c, 2018
Rogers*	6	2009, 2010, 2013, 2014c, 2015, 2017c
St Francis	4	2020, 2021, 2024, 2025
Cambridge-Isanti	2	2005, 2006
Chisago Lakes	2	2019, 2023
Princeton	1	2014c
Monticello	1	2022

- c = Co-champions
- * No longer a member

=== Girls swimming and diving ===
Team	Championships	Years won
Monticello	7	2006, 2007, 2008, 2009, 2010, 2011c, 2019, 2022
STMA*	5	2011c, 2012, 2013, 2014, 2015
Buffalo*	3	2005, 2011c, 2018

- c = Co-champions
- * No longer a member

=== Girls tennis ===
Team	Championships	Years won
Buffalo*	5	2007c, 2008, 2009, 2010, 2012c
STMA*	3	2005, 2006, 2012c
Princeton	3	2014, 2015, 2016
Cambridge-Isanti	2	2021, 2024
Rogers*	1	2011
Monticello	1	2013
Becker	1	2007c
Chisago Lakes	1	2019
St. Francis	1	2023

- c = Co-champions
- * No longer a member

=== Volleyball ===
Team	Championships	Years won
STMA*	10	2005, 2006, 2007, 2008, 2009, 2010, 2011c, 2012c, 2017, 2018
Monticello	6	2020, 2021c, 2022, 2023, 2024c, 2025
Buffalo*	3	2011c, 2012c, 2013
Cambridge-Isanti	2	2014, 2016
North Branch	3	2015, 2019, 2024c
Big Lake	1	2021c
Princeton	1	2024c

- c = Co-champions
- * No longer a member

== Winter sports ==
=== Basketball ===
Boys Team	Championships	Years won
Buffalo*	8	2006-07, 2007–08, 2008–09, 2009–10, 2010–11, 2012-13c, 2013–14, 2018-19c
Princeton	5	2018-19c, 2019–20, 2020–21, 2021–22, 2022–23
Rogers*	4	2011-12c, 2015–16, 2016–17, 2017-18
STMA*	3	2011-12c, 2012-13c, 2014–15
Monticello	3	2005-06, 2024-25, 2025-26c
Chisago Lakes	1	2023-24
Becker	1	2025-26c

Girls Team	Championships	Years won
STMA*	10	2005-06, 2008-09c, 2009-10c, 2012–13, 2013–14, 2014–15, 2015–16, 2016–17, 2017–18, 2018–19
Becker	6	2006-07, 2019–20, 2020–21, 2021-22, 2022-23, 2023-24
Buffalo*	3	2009-10c, 2010–11, 2011–12
Monticello	2	2024-25, 2025-26
Rogers*	1	2007-08
Princeton	1	2008-09c

- c = Co-champions
- * No longer a member

=== Dance ===
Team	Championships	Years won
Rogers*	9	2005-06, 2007–08, 2008–09, 2009–10, 2010–11, 2012–13, 2013–14, 2014–15, 2015–16
Big Lake	1	2006-07,
St. Cloud Cathedral	1	2011-12
Chisago Lakes	1	2016-17
St. Francis	1	2017-18
STMA*	1	2018-19
Becker	1	2019-20

- c = Co-champion
- * No longer a member

=== Gymnastics ===
Team	Championships	Years won
Cambridge-Isanti	9	2005-06, 2006–07, 2007–08, 2008–09, 2010–11, 2015–16, 2016–17, 2017–18, 2018-19c
Big Lake	5	2009-10, 2011–12, 2012–13, 2014–15, 2018-19c
North Branch	1	2013-14
Monticello	1	2018-19c

- c = Co-champion

=== Hockey ===
Boys Team	Championships	Years won
Monticello	6	2019-20, 2020-21c, 2022-23, 2023-24, 2024-25, 2025-26
Rogers*	5	2006-07, 2009–10, 2010–11, 2011–12, 2013–14
Buffalo*	5	2005-06, 2007–08, 2008–09, 2012–13, 2018–19
STMA*	4	2014-15, 2015–16, 2016–17, 2017-18
Chisago Lakes	2	2020-21c, 2021-22c
Cambridge-Isanti	1	2021-22c

- c = Co-champions
- * No longer a member

Becker and Big Lake are part of the Becker-Big Lake Eagles boys hockey co-op. Monticello is the host school for a boys hockey co-op with Maple Lake High School and goes by the nickname of Moose for hockey instead of the primary school nickname Magic.

Monticello advanced to the Class A state tournament in hockey in 2017, 2018, 2020 and 2022 and made it to the Class A state title game in 2017. No other Mississippi 8 conference member has advanced further in boys hockey. Princeton has made the boys state tournament, competing three times in 2002, 2003, 2016. Chisago Lakes has also made the boys state tournament twice while North Branch and Cambridge-Isanti have both made it once.

Girls Team	Championships	Years won
Buffalo*	5	2010-11, 2012–13, 2013–14, 2014–15, 2015–16
North Wright County*	5	2008-09, 2009–10, 2011–12, 2017–18, 2018–19
Chisago Lakes	5	2019-20, 2020–21, 2021–22, 2022-23, 2025-26
Cambridge-Isanti	3	2005-06, 2006–07, 2007–08
Rogers*	1	2016-17
Pine City Area	1	2023-24
Northern Tier**	1	2024-25

- * No longer a member
  - ** Co-op of Cambridge-Isanti, North Branch, and St. Francis

The North Wright County co-op that includes Monticello has reached the girls state tournament twice in 2011 and 2013. The Wright County co-op, consisting of all the schools in the current Buffalo and North Wright County co-ops, made the state tournament in 2005. Chisago Lakes has also made the girls state tournament three times, once in 2004 as part of a co-op with Pine City and in 2010 and 2012.

=== Boys swimming and diving ===
Team	Championships	Years won
STMA*	7	2011-12, 2012–13, 2013–14, 2014–15, 2015–16, 2016–17, 2018–19
Monticello*	3	2008-09, 2009–10, 2010–11
Cambridge-Isanti	3	2006-07, 2007–08, 2017–18
Orono	1	2005-06

- * No longer a member

=== Wrestling ===
Team	Championships	Years won
STMA*	14	2005-06, 2006–07, 2007–08, 2008–09, 2009–10, 2010–11, 2011–12, 2012–13, 2013–14, 2014–15, 2015–16, 2016–17, 2017-18c, 2018–19
Becker	7	2019-20, 2020-21, 2021-22, 2022-23, 2023-24, 2024-25, 2025-26
St. Francis	1	2017-18c

- * No longer a member

== Spring sports ==
=== Baseball ===
Team	Championships	Years won
STMA*	7	2007, 2009, 2012, 2016, 2017, 2018, 2019
Monticello	3	2006, 2023, 2025
St. Francis	2	2014, 2015
Big Lake	2	2010, 2013
Cambridge-Isanti	1	2008
Buffalo*	1	2011
Chisago Lakes	1	2021
Princeton	1	2022
Becker	1	2024

- * No longer a member

=== Golf ===
Boys Team	Championships	Years won
Rogers*	6	2008, 2009, 2010, 2011, 2012, 2013
STMA*	4	2016, 2017, 2018, 2019
Buffalo*	2	2014, 2015
Princeton	1	2007
Cambridge-Isanti	1	2006

- * No longer a member

Girls Team	Championships	Years won
Buffalo*	13	2006, 2007, 2008, 2009, 2010, 2011, 2012, 2013, 2014, 2015, 2016, 2017, 2018
STMA*	1	2019

- * No longer a member

=== Lacrosse ===
Boys Team	Championships	Years won
Chisago Lakes	4	2021, 2022, 2023, 2025
Monticello	1	2024

Girls Team	Championships	Years won
Chisago Lakes	4	2022, 2023, 2024, 2025
Monticello	1	2021

=== Softball ===
Team	Championships	Years won
Becker	6	2006, 2007, 2008, 2009, 2010, 2012
Buffalo*	4	2011, 2013, 2015c, 2017
Rogers*	4	2014, 2015c, 2016, 2019
Chisago Lakes	4	2021, 2022, 2023, 2024
North Branch	1	2018
Cambridge-Isanti	1	2025

- c = Co-champions
- * No longer a member

=== Boys tennis ===
Team	Championships	Years won
STMA*	4	2009, 2015, 2017, 2018
Buffalo*	4	2006, 2007, 2013, 2019
Becker	3	2010, 2011, 2012
Chisago Lakes	2	2014, 2016
Monticello	1	2008

- c = Co-champions
- * No longer a member

=== Track and Field ===
Boys Team	Championships	Years won
Buffalo*	8	2006, 2007, 2008, 2009, 2010, 2011, 2012, 2013
STMA*	4	2014, 2016, 2017, 2018
North Branch	1	2015
Cambridge-Isanti	1	2019, 2025
Monticello	1	2024

Girls Team	Championships	Years won
STMA*	7	2013, 2014, 2015, 2016, 2017, 2018, 2019
Monticello	5	2006, 2009, 2070, 2011, 2012, 2024
Cambridge-Isanti	2	2007, 2008, 2025

- * No longer a member
