= Chisago Lakes School District =

School district in Minnesota, United States

Coordinates: 45°23′27″N 92°49′42″W

The 165-square-mile (430 km^{2}) district is home to nearly 3,600 Pre-K through 12 students and their families. There are three elementary schools, one middle school, and one high school (Chisago Lakes High School). All of the district schools also offer a full range of services for students with special needs with access to specialists through the St. Croix River Education District (SCRED). This collaborative allows a smaller district to offer high-level services to special learners.

== 2009–2010 Budget Cuts ==
The Chisago Lakes School Board voted in early 2009 to cut $1.2 million from the 2009-10 budget. A major cut across the district was specifically in special education paraprofessionals, which may affect classroom instruction.

Other significant cuts were in custodial staff. As a result, parents and high school student volunteers spent the 2009 summer assisting with the repainting and cleaning of facilities across the district.

District superintendent Mike McLoughlin says that more "painful" cuts will need to be made for the 2010-11 school year as well.
