= Monticello School District (Minnesota) =

School district in Minnesota, United States

Monticello School District ISD 882

Location
- Wright County, Minnesota Minnesota United States

District information
- Type: Public
- Grades: K – 12th
- Superintendent: Jim Johnson

Students and staff
- Students: 4,047
- Athletic conference: Mississippi 8

Other information
- Website: http://www.monticello.k12.mn.us/

Monticello School District are the schools in Independent School District 882, serving the city of Monticello in the US state of Minnesota and surrounding area (townships of Clearwater, Monticello, and Silver Creek).

Jim Johnson became superintendent circa 2005, and he resigned effective July 6, 2017. Michael Favor became the interim superintendent.

== Schools ==
Secondary schools

- Monticello High School (Grades 9-12)
- Monticello Middle School (Grades 6-8)

Elementary schools (Grades K-5)

- Pinewood Elementary
- Little Mountain Elementary
- Eastview Elementary

=== Athletics ===
The Moose Sherritt Ice Arena, attached to the Middle School, was completed in 2005 due to the efforts of the Monticello–Annandale–Maple Lake Youth Hockey Organization, community members, the mayor, the city council, the school board, businesses and the Sherritt family. "Moose" Sherritt played for the NHL's Detroit Red Wings and the USHL's Minneapolis Millers among other teams in the 1940s.
