= Paul Broten =

American ice hockey player (born 1965)

- Born: October 27, 1965 (age 60) Roseau, Minnesota, U.S.
- Height: 5 ft 11 in (180 cm)
- Weight: 190 lb (86 kg; 13 st 8 lb)
- Position: Right wing
- Shot: Right
- Played for: New York Rangers; Dallas Stars; St. Louis Blues
- National team: United States
- NHL draft: 77th overall, 1984; New York Rangers
- Playing career: 1988–1999

Paul Newell Broten (born October 27, 1965) is an American former professional hockey player who played in 322 games in the National Hockey League (NHL) with the New York Rangers, Dallas Stars, and St. Louis Blues. He shoots right-handed and played right wing.

Broten was picked by the New York Rangers in the 4th round, 77th overall in the 1984 NHL entry draft. He then went to the University of Minnesota for 4 years, scoring 45 points in 42 games his senior year. During the 1989–1990 NHL season Broten made his debut with the Rangers. He would play for the Rangers until the 1993–1994 season when he joined the Dallas Stars. He played with the Stars for 2 years before playing one year with the Blues and their minor league affiliate Worcester Ice Cats. Broten then played in the now defunct IHL and one year in Germany before retiring after the 1998–1999 hockey season.

Broten was born in Roseau, Minnesota, and is the brother of fellow hockey players Neal and Aaron Broten. He has two daughters, Jordyn and Morgan.

His nephew, Shane Gersich, was drafted by the Washington Capitals in the 2014 NHL entry draft.

== Career statistics ==
=== Regular season and playoffs ===
			Regular season					Playoffs
Season	Team	League	GP	G	A	Pts	PIM	GP	G	A	Pts	PIM
1982–83	Roseau High School	HS-MN	—	31	20	51	—	—	—	—	—	—
1983–84	Roseau High School	HS-MN	26	29	26	55	4	—	—	—	—	—
1984–85	University of Minnesota	WCHA	44	8	8	16	26	—	—	—	—	—
1985–86	University of Minnesota	WCHA	38	6	16	22	24	—	—	—	—	—
1986–87	University of Minnesota	WCHA	48	17	22	39	52	—	—	—	—	—
1987–88	University of Minnesota	WCHA	42	19	26	45	54	—	—	—	—	—
1988–89	Denver Rangers	IHL	77	28	31	59	133	4	0	2	2	6
1989–90	New York Rangers	NHL	32	5	3	8	26	6	1	1	2	2
1989–90	Flint Spirits	IHL	28	17	9	26	55	—	—	—	—	—
1990–91	New York Rangers	NHL	28	4	6	10	18	5	0	0	0	2
1990–91	Binghamton Rangers	AHL	8	2	2	4	4	—	—	—	—	—
1991–92	New York Rangers	NHL	74	13	15	28	102	13	1	2	3	10
1992–93	New York Rangers	NHL	60	5	9	14	48	—	—	—	—	—
1993–94	Dallas Stars	NHL	64	12	12	24	30	9	1	1	2	2
1994–95	Dallas Stars	NHL	47	7	9	16	36	5	1	2	3	2
1995–96	St. Louis Blues	NHL	17	0	1	1	4	—	—	—	—	—
1995–96	Worcester IceCats	AHL	50	22	21	43	42	3	0	0	0	0
1996–97	Fort Wayne Komets	IHL	59	19	28	47	82	—	—	—	—	—
1997–98	Cincinnati Cyclones	IHL	81	9	12	21	80	9	3	1	4	8
1998–99	Berlin Capitals	DEL	50	8	15	23	100	—	—	—	—	—
IHL totals			245	73	80	153	350	13	3	3	6	14
NHL totals			322	46	55	101	264	38	4	6	10	18

=== International ===
Year	Team	Event	GP	G	A	Pts	PIM
1998	United States	WC Q	3	0	0	0	2
