= Saint Francis High School (Saint Francis, Minnesota) =

Location
- 3325 Bridge Street; Saint Francis, Minnesota 55070; United States; 45°23′17″N 93°21′00″W

Information
- Type: Public
- Established: 1914
- School district: Independent School District 15 St. Francis
- Principal: Doug Austin
- Teaching staff: 59.70 (on FTE basis)
- Grades: 9 to 12
- Enrollment: 1,139 (2024–2025)
- Student to teacher ratio: 19.08
- Colors: Navy Blue and White
- Athletics conference: Mississippi 8 Conference
- Mascot: Fighting Saint
- Team name: Fighting Saints
- Website: sfhs.isd15.org

Saint Francis High School (SFHS) is a high school located in St. Francis, Minnesota, United States. It is part of ISD 15 and covers about 165 square miles. Independent School District 15 includes the cities of St. Francis, Bethel, East Bethel, Oak Grove, portions of Andover and Nowthen, as well as portions of Athens and Stanford townships. The district is supported by a population of over 26,000 and annually educates about 6,000 people. There are three elementary schools (K–5) and one middle school (6–8) that send students to the high school.

== Academic departments ==
Saint Francis High School currently supports 13 different academic departments: art, business, counseling, FACS, industrial technology, language arts, math, music, physical education, science, social studies, special education, and world language (Spanish).

== Activities ==
Students attending Saint Francis High School have the opportunity to participate in numerous activities through the Mississippi 8 Conference and the Minnesota State High School League. Student Council, National Honor Society, Band (Wind Ensemble, Concert Band & Symphonic Band), Choir (Vox, Madrigals, Concert, Troubadours), Show Choir (Bridge Street Singers), Debate, Speech, One-act Play and Knowledge Bowl are such activities. The high school also offers club activities, such as DECA, a student newspaper (The Crier), a student made Yearbook (The Lance), drama, and art. Students are also actively involved in Cody's Closet, the food shelf hosted at the high school.

== Athletics ==
There are many different sports offered at Saint Francis High School for both boys and girls, at the varsity and junior varsity levels. In the fall, cross country, football and soccer are offered for boys, while volleyball, tennis, soccer and cross country are offered for girls sports. In the winter, girls sports include basketball, dance team, gymnastics, and hockey. Winter boys' sports include basketball, hockey, and wrestling. Boys sports offered in the spring are golf, baseball, track and field, and tennis. In the spring, girls have the opportunity to participate in softball, golf and track and field. The high school was previously a part of the North Suburban Conference but transitioned into the Mississippi 8 Conference in 2013.

== Book bans ==
Saint Francis High School and ISD 15 made state and national news in 2024 and 2025 for their controversial book ban policies. In November 2024, the school board passed a policy stating that new book acquisitions have to be filtered through conservative rating site Book Looks (affiliated with Moms for Liberty), and that any title with a Book Looks rating of three or more will be removed if a parent files a request. Per MPR News and the Minnesota Reformer, this could include books like Elie Wiesel's Night, Kurt Vonnegut's Slaughterhouse-Five, or Maya Angelou's I Know Why the Caged Bird Sings. As of March 2025, the school district's union and the American Civil Liberties Union have both filed lawsuits challenging the book ban policies.

In June 2025, the school board settled the lawsuits by returning previously banned books to school libraries, as well as agreeing to reverse the policy regarding Book Looks.

== Notable alumni ==
- Maggie Ewen ('13), shotputter
- Dakotah Lindwurm ('13), professional runner and Olympian
- Rodney Grams (66), US senator
