= Monticello High School (Minnesota) =

Coordinates: 45.2866811°N 93.7780077°W

Location
- 5225 School Blvd; Monticello, Minnesota 55362; United States

Information
- Type: Public
- Motto: Opening Doors to Excellence
- Established: September 1999 Current Building
- School district: Monticello School District
- Principal: Matthew Coalwell
- Staff: 62.41 (FTE)
- Enrollment: 1,330 (2023-2024)
- Student to teacher ratio: 21.31
- Colors: Red and Black
- Athletics conference: Mississippi 8
- Mascot: Magic
- Website: monticello.k12.mn.us

Monticello High School is a public high school located in Monticello, Minnesota, United States. It is a part of the Monticello School District. The Principals are Matthew Coalwell and Lori Hanson. The current high school was constructed in the late 1990s by architects Rego and Youngquist and officially opened in September 1999. Monticello High School (enrollment 1298) is Wright County's third largest school. The nickname for the school's athletic teams is the Magic.

Monticello residents appreciate and expect a high level of service from their Community Education Department and school recreation programs. In an effort to maximize communication with parents, Monticello High School utilizes an on-line program called Parent Portal where parents can access student grades, attendance, and assignments. Also, community demand for recreation opportunities is high.

== Athletics ==
Monticello competes in the Mississippi 8 Conference, consisting of ten other central Minnesota schools that are split into two divisions (North and South). Prior to the formation of the Mississippi 8 Conference, the Magic competed in the North Suburban Conference, and at one time the Wright County Conference. For a majority of the school's history, Monticello High School's nickname was the Redmen. After controversy arose over the name, their nickname changed to the Wildcats for a two-week period, before settling on the Magic. The sports that are offered in the Fall are boys cross country, boys soccer, football, girls cross country, girls soccer, girls swimming and diving, girls tennis, and volleyball. Sports that are offered in the Winter are boys basketball, boys hockey, boys swimming and diving, girls basketball, girls hockey, gymnastics, Nordic skiing, and wrestling. The sports that are offered in the Spring are baseball, boys golf, boys tennis, boys track, boys lacrosse, girls golf, girls lacrosse, girls track, and softball.

The Boys Golf Team won numerous Conference Championships from 1971 through 1980 and had an individual runner up, Mark Frie, in the State Tournament in 1976. Varsity tennis has also gone to state each year from 2004 to 2010.

=== Basketball ===
Boys' basketball is a notable Monticello High School athletic program. The team made several trips to the state tournament in the 1990s, and from 2004 to 2006. The team's highest tournament finish is 4th place, igniting humorous theories of a possible "4th place curse". Two Minnesota high-school basketball Players of the Year have come out of Monticello, Nate Holmstadt and Joel Przybilla. The 7-foot Przybilla went on to play for the University of Minnesota, and was a center in the NBA.

=== Cross Country ===
In 2011, the girls' cross country team won the state cross country championship in class AA, becoming Monticello's first team to win a state championship in the Minnesota State High School League and rated 3rd in the nation in 2011.

=== Football ===
In 2006, Monticello's varsity football team defeated Rogers 21-0 for their first homecoming victory since 1989. They did not win another homecoming game again until 2011.

=== Hockey ===
In 2011, the girls' hockey team, the North Wright County Riverhawks, a co-op of STMA, Annandale and Monticello High Schools, qualified for the state tournament for the first time, after defeating Roseau High School in the 8AA section finals.

In 2017 the Monticello/Annandale/Maple Lake (MAML) Moose hockey team made a surprise run in the Class A state championship game. The Moose became the first unseeded team to beat the two seed in the quarterfinals defeating Delano 3-2. In the semi-finals the Moose defeated Northfield 3-2 to advance to the schools first ever championship game. MAML lost the championship to the defending state champs and number one seed Hermantown 4-3 in a thrilling double overtime game.

=== Lacrosse ===
The Monticello girls' lacrosse team, also known as the Montiquois, have won the state league tournament four consecutive years before becoming a school sponsored sport.

The boys' club lacrosse team, Montiquois, won the state championship title in 2011 and 2012, before becoming a school sponsored activity.

=== Soccer ===
The Monticello boys' soccer team has consistently been a conference powerhouse, winning the Mississippi 8 Conference Championship five years straight from 2004 to 2009. During that same period, the team lost the section championship game in shoot-outs three separate years and had yet to succeed in gaining a bid to the state tournament. In 2006, the boys' soccer team ranked second in the state in total goals scored with 88 goals scored and only 13 goals against. On October 16, 2014 the team beat Cloquet in the Section 7A finals to advance to their first ever state tournament. They were defeated in the first round by Mankato West 4-0 to close out their season.

=== Swimming and Diving ===
In 2012, the boys' swimming and diving team took second place in class A state, and won 4 of the 12 events. The girls' swimming and diving team holds a 15 season streak of winning Sections.

=== Trap Shooting ===
In June 2014, the trapshooting team took 2nd in the state of Minnesota out of hundreds of schools, the first inaugural state trapshooting meet.

In June 2015, the trapshooting team took 3rd in the state of Minnesota, being the only team in the high school league to place back-to-back in the top 3 of the team portions.

=== Wrestling ===
The Monticello Wrestling team has made three state tournament appearances; 2012, 2011, and 1980. Multiple Monticello Alumni have continued their careers in college and have been ranked nationally in Olympic wrestling styles.

== Activities ==
In 2009 the Monticello High School mock trial team took fourth place at the state competition in Duluth, MN.

== Facilities ==
The Moose Sherritt Ice Arena, attached to the Middle School, was completed in 2005 due to the efforts of the Monticello-Annandale-Maple Lake Youth Hockey Organization, community members, the mayor, the city council, the school board, businesses and the Sherritt family. The arena is named in honor of Gordon "Moose" Sherritt who played for the NHL's Detroit Red Wings and the USHL's Minneapolis Millers among other teams in the 1940s, and was a long time Monticello resident.

The Field House is attached to the High School and contains a 200-meter indoor track and basketball courts. The main court has been used to host the Minnesota State High School League section semifinals and finals. The Field house main wood floor has also recently been updated.

Monticello Memorial Stadium, opened August 17, 2017, is a 3,000 seat football and soccer stadium located at the High School. The stadium features the second largest scoreboard in the state at the high school level, behind only Eden Prairie.
