= Cambridge-Isanti High School =

- Cambridge in Isanti County, Minnesota

Location
- 430 NW 8th Ave; Cambridge, Minnesota 55008; United States; 45.5805556°N 93.2294444°W

Information
- Type: Public
- Established: 1869; 157 years ago
- Principal: Steve Gibbs
- Staff: 69.14 (FTE)
- Enrollment: 1,610 (2023-2024)
- Student to teacher ratio: 23.29
- Slogan: Every Student, Every Day
- Athletics conference: Mississippi 8
- Mascot: Bluejacket
- Colors: Blue and White
- Website: https://cihs.c-ischools.org/

Cambridge-Isanti High School is a four-year public high school located in Cambridge, Minnesota, United States. The page for this school on the web site of the Minnesota State High School League (MSHSL) shows a present enrollment of 1377 students in grades nine through twelve. It is notable for being the site of an internet meme where a student runs away from a floating kid, which was originally taken in 2016.

== Athletics ==
Cambridge-Isanti competes in the Mississippi 8 Conference, consisting of either other central Minnesota schools. Prior to the formation of the Mississippi 8 Conference Cambridge-Isanti competed in the North Suburban Conference
