= Buffalo High School (Minnesota) =

Public high school in Buffalo, Minnesota, United States

Coordinates: 45.1824869°N 93.8299960°W

Location
- 877 Bison Blvd; Buffalo, Minnesota; United States of America

Information
- Type: Public
- Established: 1997 Current Building
- Principal: Mark Mischke
- Teaching staff: 77.93 (FTE)
- Enrollment: 1,792 (2023–24)
- Student to teacher ratio: 22.99
- Athletics conference: Lake Conference
- Mascot: Bison
- Colors: Purple and black
- Website: Buffalo High School Main Page

Buffalo High School (BHS) is a public secondary school in Buffalo, Minnesota, United States. It serves students from the communities of Buffalo, Hanover, and Montrose within the Buffalo–Hanover–Montrose School District (Independent School District No. 877). As of the 2023–24 school year, the school enrolled 1,792 students.

== History ==
Education in the Buffalo area began in small local facilities before expanding alongside population growth. The high school relocated multiple times as enrollment increased, including use of what later became Discovery Elementary School.

In the 1970s, Buffalo High School moved to a new building near Minnesota State Highway 25. Continued suburban growth led to voter approval of a 1994 referendum to construct a new high school east of the city. Construction for the current building began in 1995 and finished in the winter of 1997. The new campus included a performing arts center, athletic fields, and specialized instructional spaces. Following the move, the former high school became Buffalo Community Middle School, while the previous middle school was converted into Discovery Elementary School and district administrative offices.

Buffalo also sought to expand its athletic facilities. In 2006, the Bison Activity Center was built, an athletics center that now includes an indoor track, basketball courts, batting cages, tennis courts, and multipurpose athletic spaces. A 2014 bond referendum funded a football stadium, a track, practice fields, and a gymnasium (as well as classroom expansions and renovations to the performing arts center). These renovations were completed prior to the 2016–17 school year.

== Curriculum ==
Buffalo High School offers 150 courses. The instructional day operates on a five-period schedule.

In the 2005–06 school year, Buffalo High School established an arts magnet program designed for students with strengths in visual, performing, media, and literary arts. Students participated in arts-integrated core coursework and completed a senior project. The graduating class of 2022 was the final cohort of the program.

== Extracurricular activities ==
=== Newspaper ===
The website for the school newspaper The Hoofprint won the online Pacemaker Award in 2010.

=== Music program ===
The school maintains a comprehensive music program with band, choir, and orchestra offerings at multiple participation levels. Ensembles have performed at statewide conferences and competitions, including in 2011 at the Minnesota Music Educators Association Clinic. In 2012 the Concert Choir was selected to perform at Orchestra Hall in the Choral Arts Finale and in the fall of 2012 they were selected to perform at the ACDA-MN Fall Conference. The program also includes jazz ensembles, chamber orchestra, and the summer marching band known as The Herd.

=== Athletics ===
Buffalo High School competes in the Lake Conference, which includes several suburban high schools in the Minneapolis. metropolitan area. Prior to 2019, the school competed in the Mississippi 8 Conference and the North Suburban Conference. The school offers interscholastic athletics for both boys and girls.

- The Bison Boys Track team won the 2009 Boys AA Track Title.
- Buffalo's Knowledge Bowl team won the 2014 AA State Title at the Minnesota State Knowledge Bowl Meet in Brainerd.

==== 2006–07 ====
- The Bison Boys Basketball team won the school's first ever state athletic team title, beating Robbinsdale Armstrong in the Class 4A final at Target Center.
- The Buffalo Mock Trial team won the state title, defeating White Bear Lake in the championship round. Buffalo went on to place 17th at the national tournament.

== Awards and recognition ==
Currently the Buffalo High School building stands as the 3rd largest school building in the state by area, after Wayzata High School in Plymouth, Minnesota and St. Michael-Albertville High School in Albertville, Minnesota.

== Notable alumni ==
- Treyton Welch, professional American football tight end
