= North Branch Area High School =

Location
- 38175 Grand Avenue; North Branch, Minnesota, (Chisago County) 55056; United States; 45°30′7″N 92°58′8″W

Information
- School type: Public, High School
- Motto: We are V.I.K.E.S.
- Established: 1932
- Status: Open
- School board: North Branch Area Public Schools
- School district: Independent School District #138
- Superintendent: Sarah Paul
- CEEB code: 241850
- Dean: Thomas McCarthy
- Principal: Clint Link
- Teaching staff: 28.70 (FTE)
- Grades: 9–12
- Student to teacher ratio: 24.22
- Hours in school day: 6.5 hours
- Campus: Suburban
- Colors: Red & white
- Fight song: "Across the Field" (OSU Fight Song)
- Athletics conference: Mississippi 8
- Sports: Football, volleyball, soccer, tennis, theatre
- Mascot: Viktor the Viking
- Nickname: NB
- Team name: Vikings
- Yearbook: REDite
- Website: www.isd138.org/o/nbahs

North Branch Area High School is a four-year public high school located in North Branch, Minnesota, United States. The school was founded in 1932.

== Extra-curricular and co-curricular activities ==
North Branch Area High School offers a few co-curricular and extra-curricular programs in theatrics, music, culinary and other arts.

- Concert Band
- Symphonic Band
- Concert Choir
- Fall Play
- One-Act Play
- Spring Musical
- Speech
- Knowledge Bowl
- Math League
- Air Force JROTC
- DECA
- Prostart
- Robotics

=== Sports ===
North Branch Area High School is a member of the Mississippi 8 conference which includes the Chisago Lakes Wildcats, Monticello Magic, North Branch Vikings, Buffalo Bison, Princeton Tigers, The Cambridge-Isanti Bluejackets, Rogers Royals, Big Lake Hornets, St. Michael - Albertville Knights, and the St. Francis Saints.

- Fall
  - Cross Country
  - Football
  - Soccer-Boys
  - Soccer-Girls
  - Tennis
  - Volleyball
- Winter
  - Basketball-Boys
  - Basketball-Girls
  - Gymnastics
  - Hockey-Boys
  - Hockey-Girls
  - Wrestling
- Spring
  - Baseball
  - Softball
  - Golf

=== Clubs ===
- National Honor Society
- Air Force JROTC
- Student Council
- Tech Club
- Business in Action
- Yearbook

== Notable alumni ==
- Ruth Edelstein, Broadway Actress (1918) Namesake for the Edelstein Auditorium
