= Chisago Lakes High School =

Location
- 29400 Olinda Trail; Lindström, Minnesota 55045; United States; 45°22′28″N 92°50′36″W

Information
- Type: High School
- Motto: Our mission... student success
- Established: 1943
- School district: Chisago Lakes School District
- Principal: Brent Stavig
- Teaching staff: 68.92 (FTE)
- Grades: 9–12
- Enrollment: 1,048 (2023-2024)
- Student to teacher ratio: 15.21
- Colors: Forest Green, Vegas Gold, Black, White
- Mascot: Wally the Wildcat
- Website: clhs.isd2144.org

Chisago Lakes High School, located in Lindström, Minnesota, serves more than 1,100 students in grades 9–12.The school has earned accreditation by the North Central Association of Colleges and Schools. It provides an average curriculum for its students, containing a good variety of electives and all of the state required courses. Chisago Lakes High School offers a fine arts program as well as 24 athletic activities and 20 co-curricular activities.

The school facility is located on 96 acres (390,000 m^{2}) and has athletic fields, tennis courts, a community swimming pool, five computer labs, weight room, fitness center, and a 600-seat performing arts center.

== Accountability programs ==
The Minnesota Department of Education announced that Chisago Lakes High School failed to make Adequate Yearly Progress (AYP) under the federal No Child Left Behind Act for the 2007–08 and 2009-10 school years.

Chisago Lakes High School was one of four schools in the Chisago Lakes School District and one of the 937 Minnesota schools that did not see improvement for the 2007–08 school year, but did see an improvement in the 2012–2013, 2013-2014 school years and was awarded bronze in the national school rankings

== Sports ==
Chisago Lakes High School has recently become a member of the Mississippi 8 conference which includes the Chisago Lakes Wildcats, Monticello Magic, North Branch Vikings, Buffalo Bison, Princeton Tigers, The Cambridge-Isanti Bluejackets, Rogers Royals, Big Lake Hornets, St. Michael - Albertville Knights, and the St. Francis Saints.

- Fall
  - Cross Country
  - Football
  - Soccer-Boys
  - Soccer-Girls
  - Swim and Dive-Girls
  - Tennis-Girls
  - Volleyball
  - Chearleading
- Winter
  - Basketball-Boys
  - Basketball-Girls
  - Dance
  - Gymnastics
  - Hockey-Boys
  - Hockey-Girls
  - Alpine Skiing
  - Swim and Dive-Boys
  - Wrestling
  - Power Lifting
- Spring
  - Baseball
  - Golf-Girls
  - Golf-Boys
  - Softball
  - Tennis-Boys
  - Track and Field
  - Lacrosse-Boys
  - Lacrosse-Girls

== Arts ==
Chisago Lakes High School offers a few co-curricular and extra-curricular programs in the arts. Their musical theatre program, has put on 11 productions, notably 2014's White Christmas which won Outstanding Overall Production/Performance from the Hennepin Theatre Trust's SpotLight program and qualified to perform a medley at Spotlight Showcase. 2021's Bye Bye Birdie and 2023's The Addams Family qualified as well.

- Co-Curricular Activities
  - Band
  - Choir
- Extra-Curricular Activities
  - Fall Musical
  - One Act Play
  - Speech
  - Visual Arts
  - Math League
