= Edina Public Schools =

School district in Minnesota, United States

The Edina School District is the public school system for most of the city of Edina, Minnesota. It is also referred to as the Independent School District (ISD) 273. There are approximately 8,500 students, K-12, served by 1139 teachers and support staff in six elementary schools (Grades K-5), two middle schools (Grades 6–8) and one high school (Grades 9–12).

In November 2003, residents of the city of Edina passed an $85.8 million bond referendum to renovate some of the school facilities in the district. Construction began in the spring of 2004 and finished up in 2007.

Since the late 2010s, the district has increasingly gained attention as select community members believe that the district has social justice curriculum.

== History of elementary and middle school education ==
In 1859, when Edina was still the western part of Richfield Township, residents of what would become northern Edina organized school district 17 and built the district's first school. It was a one-room, white frame building built at Code's Corner, which today is occupied by Normandale Lutheran Church at West 62nd Street and Minnesota State Highway 100. At the time it was evident that Edina was still a farming town, since school vacations coincided with spring planting and fall harvesting so the children could help in the fields.

In the mid-1860s, a number of Irish families began settling on the farms around the Edina Mill and decided they needed a school for their children. So, in 1864, Edina's second one-room school was built on the corner of today's West 70th Street and Cahill Road and named the Cahill School. Then in 1958 a brick and mortar Cahill school replaced the original one room school house on Cahill Road. This Building was demolished thirty years later, the land sold to a town house developer. This development or mistake creating a new need to expand the elementary system a few years later at a great cost to the district.

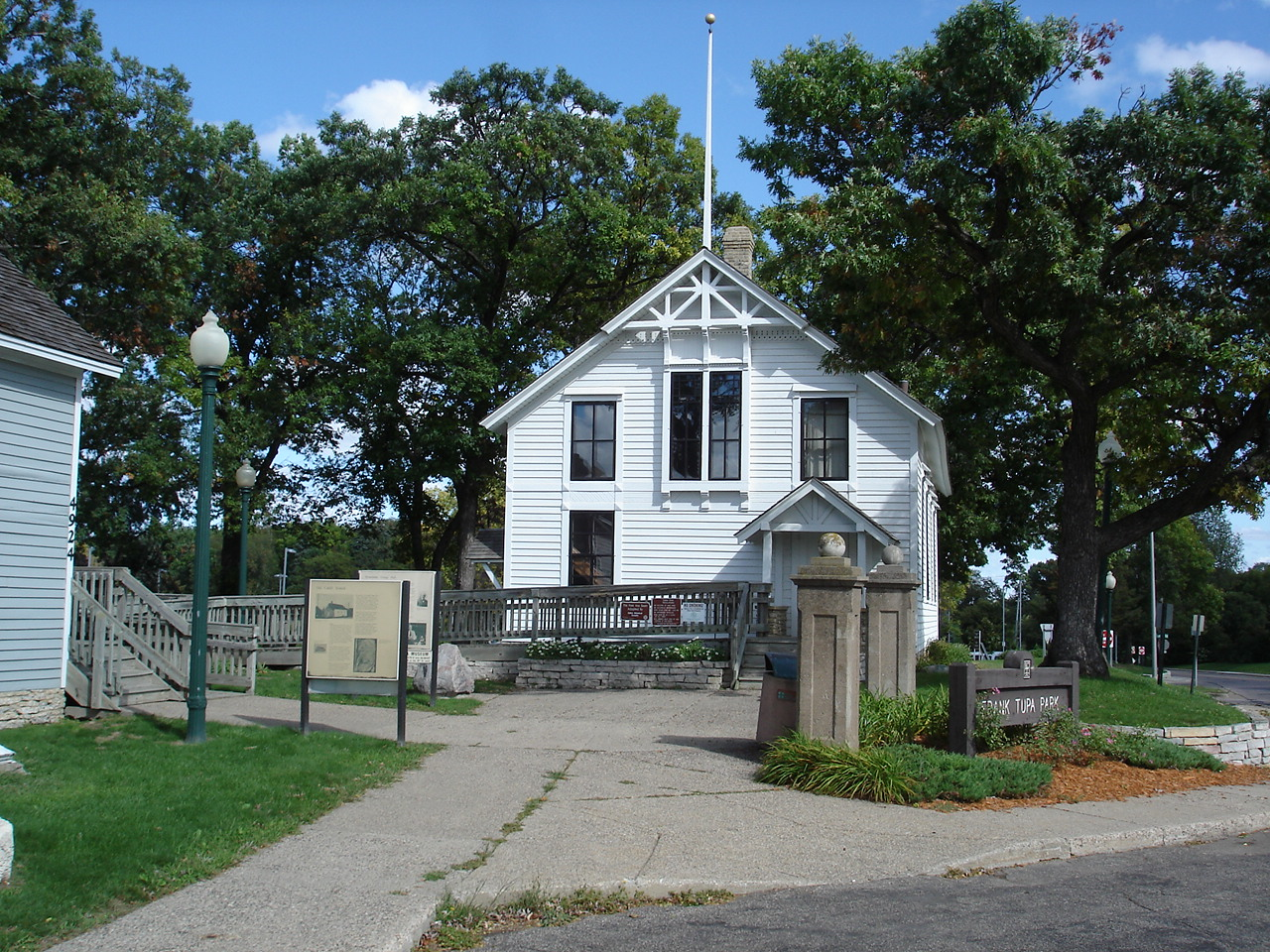
The Minnehaha Grange Hall and the Cahill School(blue building to the left) located on the grounds of Frank Tupa park

As the area's population began shifting toward the Edina Mills community near Minnehaha Creek and 50th Street, the Code's Corner School was becoming a long walk for those children living in the growing settlement around the Mill. So, in February 1872, the officers of school district 17 voted to move the one-room schoolhouse one mile (1.6 km) north to the present site of Edina's City Hall. That winter, farmer Code loaded the building on skids and, with the help of oxen, hauled the building across the snow to the new location.

In 1887, due to the growth in District 17, a decision was made to build a larger elementary school. In that same year Edina's first multi-room school was built as the second site of the Code's Corner School. Although this multi-room school building had been enlarged and remodeled several times, the villages continuing development resulted in severe overcrowding by the early 1920s. Even though another two-room portable school was erected in 1923 near Grimes and West 45th Street, this helped little. It was clear that a new school was needed.

After some controversy as to where to build the new school, two new schools were built as a compromise. In 1925 the Wooddale School was built at a cost of $200,000 at the corner of 50th Street and Wooddale Avenue South. The school had 12 classrooms for eight elementary grades, an auditorium that seated 1,110 people, a library, kitchen, cafeteria, and private offices for the teachers. The other school, a four-room Morningside school, was built on a 5-acre (20,000 m^{2}) tract at West 42nd Street and Grimes Avenue. Morningside children in the upper grades would attend the Wooddale school, as well as all the Edina students. In December 1926, the new Wooddale and Morningside schools were dedicated and opened. In 1936, the Wooddale school was enlarged by a rear addition of ninth grade classes. The school now served as a junior high as well as an elementary school.

By the 1950s, the Wooddale School was facing severe overcrowding as the district continued to grow. In February 1951, an appropriation was approved for the construction of a new elementary school to be built just south of the newly constructed high school. In January 1952, construction of Concord Elementary school was completed. By 1954, huge areas of Edina that had shortly before been wooded hills and farmlands were being bulldozed for new houses. To keep pace with this rapid growth, a new wing was added to Concord Elementary school in September 1954 adding 17 classrooms and exactly doubling Concord's size.

Construction of several other elementary schools began shortly after the addition to Concord. Highlands Elementary school opened in September 1957 on a site west of Minnesota Highway 100 and north of what is now Vernon Avenue and the brick and mortar New Cahill Elementary replaced the historic one at 70th and Cahill. Highlands had 24 classrooms and 13 special rooms. In response to declining enrollment, the school was closed in 1982 and leased to Eden Prairie from 1984 to 1990. It was reopened by the Edina School District in fall 1991. Cahill historic was moved to the village hall off Vernon Avenue and the brick and mortar Cahill was destroyed.

Since the opening of the high school in 1949, it served as a combination junior/senior high school. But, by 1954, plans were under way to construct a separate junior high on the site next to the high school. The new Edina-Morningside Junior High, later to be renamed South View, opened in September 1956 with 680 seventh- and eighth-graders. The school had 19 classrooms plus 11 classrooms used temporarily for elementary students. In 1960, another elementary school was built when Cornelia Elementary school was opened to serve the new residential areas that had developed around Southdale Center and Lake Cornelia. From 1954 through 1960, Edina Public Schools had grown from a student population of 3,720 to 7,196. Of these, approximately 4,000 were attending six elementary schools, and roughly 3,000 attended the junior high schools.

In 1964, construction of a second junior high, Valley View Junior High, began. The school got its name from the fact that it sat on top of a hill and overlooked a valley. Construction was slowed during the early phases because several unmarked graves were found on the site and needed to be moved and re-buried. However, the school opened on time in September 1964. In 1972, the school was renamed Edina West - Lower division when a second senior high school, called Edina West - Upper Division, opened on a site adjacent to and just north of the original Valley View building. However, after the two senior high schools were combined (see History of Edina High School) in the Edina West building in 1981, the junior high next door once again became Valley View. Both South View and Valley View originally only covered students in grades seven through nine, while the elementary schools housed kindergarten through sixth grade. In the fall of 1992, both junior high schools were re-designated as middle schools and their student populations were enlarged to include grades six through nine. Since then, Edina's elementary schools have housed students in grades kindergarten through fifth grade.

In 1966 and 1968 two new elementary schools were built after the Board of Education decided Edina needed still more elementary school space. Countryside Elementary was opened in 1966 and Creek Valley Elementary was opened in 1968. These were the final two elementary schools to be built in the district.

In 1979, most of the Morningside school was torn down and replaced by newer, more modern facilities, and a year later, in 1980, the Wooddale school was retired from active classroom use. Five years later in 1985 it was torn down.

For the 2018–2019 school year construction and renovations were completed to all the schools, and the two middle schools now teach grades 6 to 8, with grade 9 moving up to the high school.

== Elementary schools ==
There are six elementary schools throughout the district of Edina that serve students in grades kindergarten through fifth grade. In 1987 all the kindergarten classes were consolidated at the Edina Kindergarten Center, the former Edina East High School Building (Today the Edina Community Center, District Office and Normandale Elementary). However, by 1993, the kindergarten classes had been moved back to the neighborhood elementary schools. The space occupied by the Edina Kindergarten Center became the Normandale Elementary French Immersion School.

Since 1993, three options for elementary programs have been available to parents of entering kindergarten students: continuous progress, neighborhood, or French Immersion. In 2022, Countryside Elementary School started offering Spanish Dual Immersion. Today, roughly 70 percent of K-5 students are enrolled in the neighborhood school program, 20 percent enroll in the French Immersion school (Normandale) and the remaining 10 percent enroll in the district's continuous progress alternative, at either Highlands and Countryside Elementary Schools. Continuous progress at Countryside is currently being phased out while Spanish Dual Immersion is being phased in.

There are five neighborhood elementary schools: Concord, Countryside, Creek Valley, Highlands and Cornelia, generally serving children who live nearby, in addition Normandale, the French Immersion option that serves enrolled children from the entire school district. Students generally attend the school that falls within their section.

School	Year built
Concord Elementary School	1952
Cornelia Elementary School	1960
Countryside Elementary School	1966
Creek Valley Elementary School	1968
Highlands Elementary School	1957
Normandale Elementary French Immersion School	1949

== Middle schools ==
Edina has two middle schools for students in 6th to 8th grade. Generally, 6th to 8th grade students who live west of Minnesota Highway 100 attend Valley View Middle School and students who live east of Highway 100 attend South View Middle School. Minnesota Highway 100 approximately divides the City of Edina in half in the north south direction. Many students continuing in the French Immersion program opt to attend the Extended French Program at Valley View Middle School. Valley View was awarded Blue Ribbon School status in 1986–87.

School	Year built
South View Middle School	1956
Valley View Middle School	1964

== High schools ==
Edina High School opened in 1949 and is a four-year public high school. Enrollment is approximately 2,700 students, with a graduating class of about 670 students. In the early 1970s, a bond issue was approved by voters to construct a second high school to accommodate the increasing enrollment. During a nine-year period from the class of 1973 to the class of 1981, the district operated two high schools, Edina East and Edina West (see History of Edina High School). The Edina West building location is now known as Edina High School, and the original high school location and former Edina East High School functions as the Edina Community Center, housing the community education and early childhood programs, district offices and Normandale French Immersion K-5 grade school.

The mascot for Edina High School is the Hornet.

School	Location	Years of operation
Edina High School	Current Location	Fall, 1981–Present
Edina West High School	Current Location	Fall, 1972–Spring, 1981
Edina High School	Community Center Location	1949–1972
Edina East High School	Community Center Location	Fall, 1972–Spring, 1981

== Referendums ==
There have been seven referendums since May 1992.

=== 2015 ===
On May 5, 2015, the Edina School Board voted unanimously to conduct a special election bond referendum. The one-question referendum will request voter-approval of $124.9 million in bond funding, payable over 21 years, for the purposes of updating learning spaces and enhancing building security at the district's 10 schools, while also improving district infrastructure. The 2015 referendum passed with 57% in-favor and 43% against.

== See also ==
- List of school districts in Minnesota
