= Breckie Hill =

American influencer (born 2003)

- Hill in 2025
- Born: Brecken Hill; April 18, 2003 (age 23); Edina, Minnesota, United States
- Education: Gustavus Adolphus College; University of Miami
- Occupation: Influencer
- Years active: 2019–present
- Partner: Jynxzi (2024) (Note: On and off relationship)

Instagram information
- Page: Breckie Hill
- Years active: 2014–present
- Genres: Lifestyle, lip-syncing
- Followers: 2.2 million

TikTok information
- Page: Breckie Hill
- Years active: 2019–present
- Genres: Lifestyle, lip-syncing
- Followers: 4.9 million

X information
- Handle: @breckiebaby
- Display name: Breckie
- Years active: 2023–present
- Topic: Entertainment
- Followers: 541 thousand

YouTube information
- Channel: Breckie Hill
- Years active: 2022
- Genres: Lifestyle, lip-syncing
- Subscribers: 1.3 thousand
- Views: 152 thousand
- Last updated: October 26, 2026
- Breckie Hill's voice On her relationship with Jynxzi; Recorded March 2025

Brecken Hill (born April 18, 2003) is an American influencer. Born in Minnesota, she began gaining prominence on TikTok at the end of high school and into university, after which she dropped out and relocated to Los Angeles. As of October 2026, she has over two million followers on Instagram and nearly five million on TikTok. Hill is also a content creator on OnlyFans and has garnered attention over her public feuds with celebrities, most notably with fellow influencer Livvy Dunne.

== Biography ==
Hill on a hockey rink in 2025

Brecken Hill was born on April 18, 2003 in Edina, Minnesota. She lived in Chicago until age five, at which point she returned to Edina. Hill has described her parents as strict and religious when she was growing up. She went to Edina High School; afterwards, she attended Gustavus Adolphus College in St. Peter, Minnesota and the University of Miami (UM) with aspirations of becoming a dermatologist. Hill has stated that she never aspired to be famous.

Hill began gaining a following on TikTok at the end of high school, when a prom-transition video acquired 30 thousand likes. After continued growth, she took a gap year from UM to experiment with life as an influencer, moving to Los Angeles. By October 2026, she had acquired over two million followers on Instagram and Snapchat, as well as around five million on TikTok.

Hill's content on social media primarily consists of lip-syncing and dancing. In addition to her social media, she also operates an OnlyFans account. She stated that she created it after an ex-boyfriend from Minnesota leaked old nude images of her out of jealousy over her success. Hill claimed in 2023 to be making half a million monthly from it, and alleges that she once made $300 thousand in a single day. She has received coverage for her claims that most OnlyFans creators are lying about how much they make on the platform.

Throughout her career, Hill has feuded with various other influencers. Since 2023, Hill has engaged in a substantial public feud with fellow influencer Livvy Dunne. Hill, who has been described as a "rival" of Dunne, has been frequently compared to her over their similar content-styles and appearance, being described online as "Livvy with Cannons"; (Note: "Cannons" meaning breasts) this spiraled into accusations by netizens and the media that Hill was a "clone" of Dunne and was copying her videos. The feud started when Hill called Dunne "a bitch" in February 2023. Although she denied there existed a dispute on an April appearance on the BFFs podcast, the row between the two continued to escalate over the course of the year, with repeated spats on social media, causing Dunne to eventually block her. The dispute continued to flare up occasionally afterward.

== Personal life ==
Hill in 2023

Hill has claimed to have been inspired by Alix Earle, who attended UM alongside her. They live in the same building as of August 2026. She has a younger brother. Her mother initially disapproved of her work on OnlyFans, believing that she was producing hardcore pornography, but became content with it after she realized she was not, and is now her business manager.

Hill had an on and off relationship with Jynxzi, a Twitch streamer and YouTuber, throughout 2024. The two started dating around February, then broke up in May, before getting back together only to break up again in June, get back together, and then break up permanently in September. Jynxzi claimed that the relationship ended due to his pornographic addiction and "stalking" of other women on social media.

In late 2024, Irish actor Barry Keoghan and American singer Sabrina Carpenter broke up; rumors subsequentially began circulating that Keoghan had cheated on Carpenter. Celebrity gossip site DeuxMoi later reported that Keoghan was seen with a "blonde, semi famous LA-based influencer". Several netizens claimed that Hill was the individual this referred to based on her being present at two locations in Los Angeles Keoghan was rumored to be at on November 18 during a concert of Carpenter's in the city. She was also accused of making alleged references made by her towards him. The speculation intensified after she reposted some of the rumors on Snapchat, but Hill on December 7 denied that she had any relationship with Keoghan, claiming that she never met him and that she only reposted the claims since she found them "ridiculous".
