= Jonathan Taylor Grimes House =

Historic house in Minnesota, United States

- U.S. National Register of Historic Places
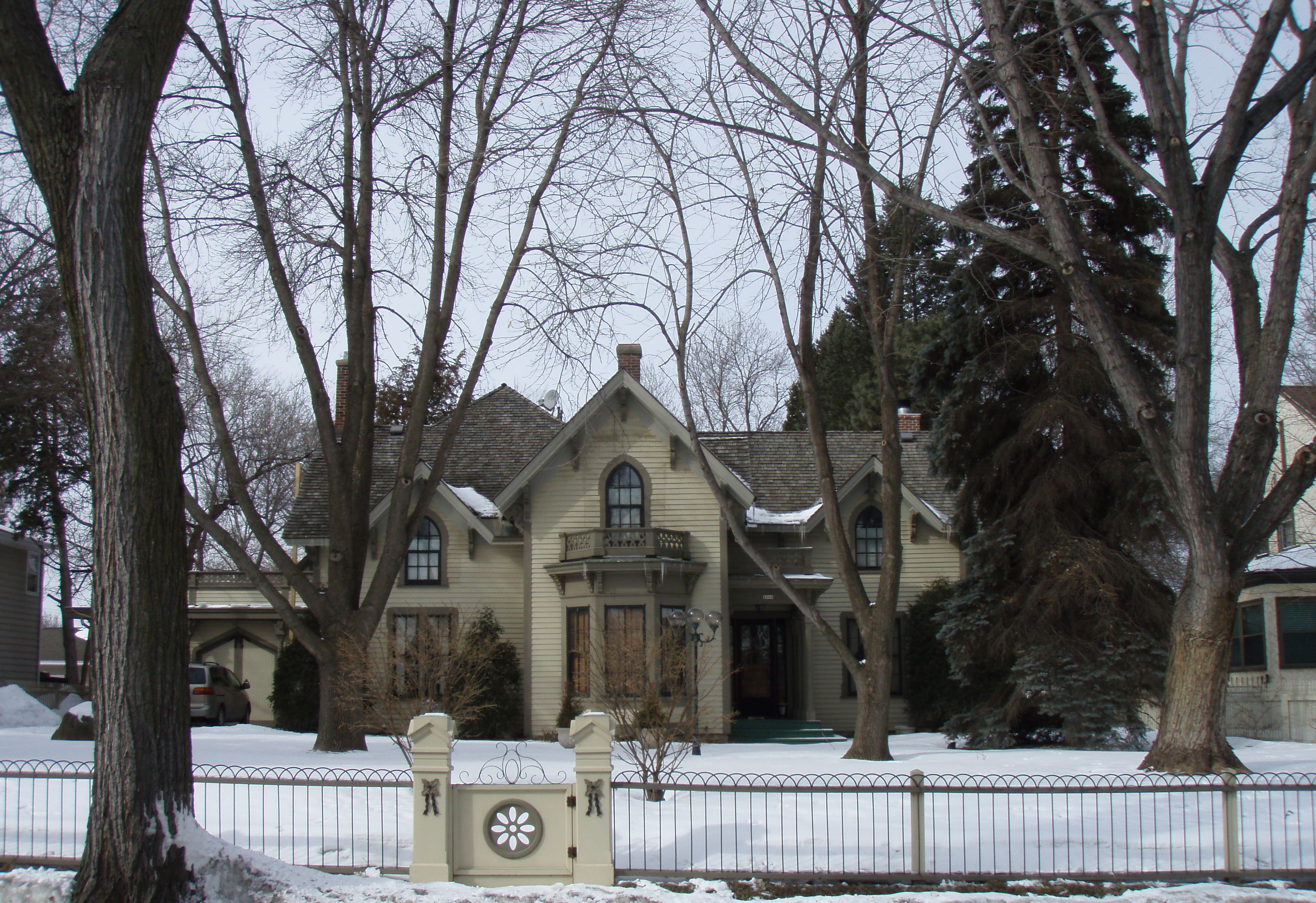

- Location within Minnesota Location within the United States
- Location: 4200 W. 44th Street, Edina, Minnesota
- Coordinates: 44°55′20″N 93°19′54″W
- Built: 1869
- Architectural style: Gothic Revival
- NRHP reference No.: 76001056
- Added to NRHP: March 16, 1976

The Jonathan Taylor Grimes House is one of the oldest standing houses in Edina, Minnesota, United States.

== Description and history ==
It was built in 1869, and appears to have been influenced by Andrew Jackson Downing's book The Architecture of Country Houses. The house is a 1½ story frame cottage with intersecting gable roofs, dormers, a bay window, and a shallow front porch. Gothic Revival details are found in the second-story windows, the steeply pitched roof lines, and the gabled wall dormers. Some Italianate influences are also present in the shallow portico and the wide eaves with scroll-cut brackets. The house was listed on the National Register of Historic Places in 1976.

The owner of the house, Jonathan Taylor Grimes, was an early settler in the Edina area and a pioneer horticulturist. Grimes was born in Leesburg, Virginia in 1818 and moved to Terre Haute, Indiana in 1840. He married Eliza Angeline Gordon in 1843. Eliza and Jonathan, along with three small children, moved to Saint Anthony in 1854. In 1859, Grimes and a partner, William Rheem, purchased 160 acres (65 ha) in the southwest corner of what was then Richfield Township. This land included the Waterville Mill on Minnehaha Creek. The mill was later known as the Buckwater Mill, then the Browndale Mill, and finally the Edina Mill. Grimes later obtained a quit claim deed to 160 acres (65 ha) north and east of the mill, where he built the house in 1869. In 1867, Grimes and Rheem sold the mill, and Grimes went on to become the first president of the Minnesota Horticultural Society. He conducted a variety of agricultural experiments, and he was responsible for introducing ginkgo and catalpa trees to Minnesota.

Eliza Grimes died in 1902, and her husband died in 1903. After his death, the farmstead was subdivided. It became the Morningside area, a streetcar suburb. Morningside seceded from Edina in 1920, then rejoined Edina in 1966. Grimes Avenue in Edina is named for him, and Alden Drive is named for his son.
