= Valley View Middle School (Edina, Minnesota) =

School in Minnesota, United States

Coordinates: 44°52′51″N 93°22′34″W

Information
- Grades: 6-8
- Enrollment: c.1040
- Language: English; French
- Website: https://valleyview.edinaschools.org/

Valley View Middle School (formerly called Valley View Junior High School) is a three-year (grades 6-8), public middle school located in Edina, Minnesota, USA, a first ring suburb of Minneapolis. The school has a current enrollment of about 1,040 students. It, and its sister school South View Middle School, each take students from three of the six elementary schools of the Edina Public School System.

== Academics ==
The school was awarded Blue Ribbon School status in 1986-87, the highest honor a US school can receive.

The school offers a French Immersion program. Thus, students from the Normandale Elementary French Immersion School are able to continue learning in two languages - English and French. Those students have some of their core classes in French.

Two teachers from the school won the secondary category of the Minnesota Historical Society award for excellence in history curriculum in 1991. Valley View is known for having highly regarded teachers who are entertaining and instructive to their students. A team of sixth-graders captured first place, in 1998, in the sixth-grade Blue Division of the WordMasters Challenge, a national language competition, against more than 35,000 participants from 435 private and public schools. In 2011, the ninth-grade Knowledge Masters team won first place internationally. The school won the FBI Safe Online Surfing Award for January and February 2008.

== Athletics ==
The school's athletic teams are the Hornets and are part of Edina High School's athletic program.

== Notable alumni ==
- Student Nicole Dumonceaux, skating with John Reppucci, represented the US at the 1992 World Junior Figure Skating Championships, in the Ice Dance.
- Craig Finn, singer
