= Edinborough Park =

Indoor park in Edina, Minnesota

Coordinates: 44.86253°N 93.32225°W

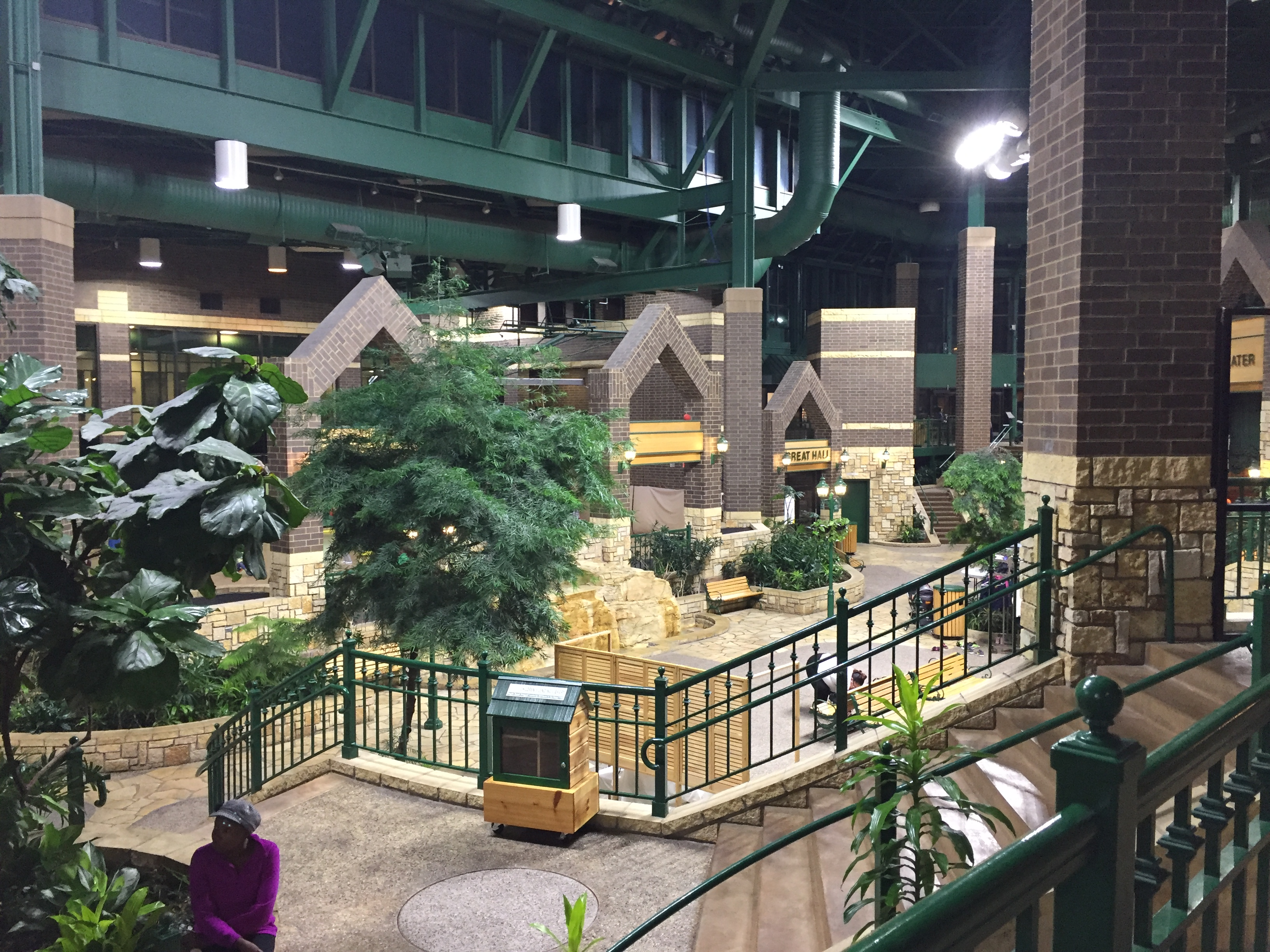
Inside Edinborough Park

Edinborough Park is a 1-acre (4,000 m^{2}), fully enclosed indoor park located in Edina, Minnesota. The park is operated by the City of Edina and contains a junior-Olympic size swimming pool, a 250-seat Greek-style amphitheater, a running track and fitness area, a huge indoor playground and a multi-purpose banquet room and play area. All of these amenities are connected by meandering pathways through the densely landscaped interior, which contains more than 6,000 plants, trees and flowers.

Enclosing the park are condominiums as well as the Residence Inn by Marriott, both of which have indoor access to the pool/track and paid admission to the park.
