= Edina Mill =

Coordinates: 44°54′45″N 93°20′32″W

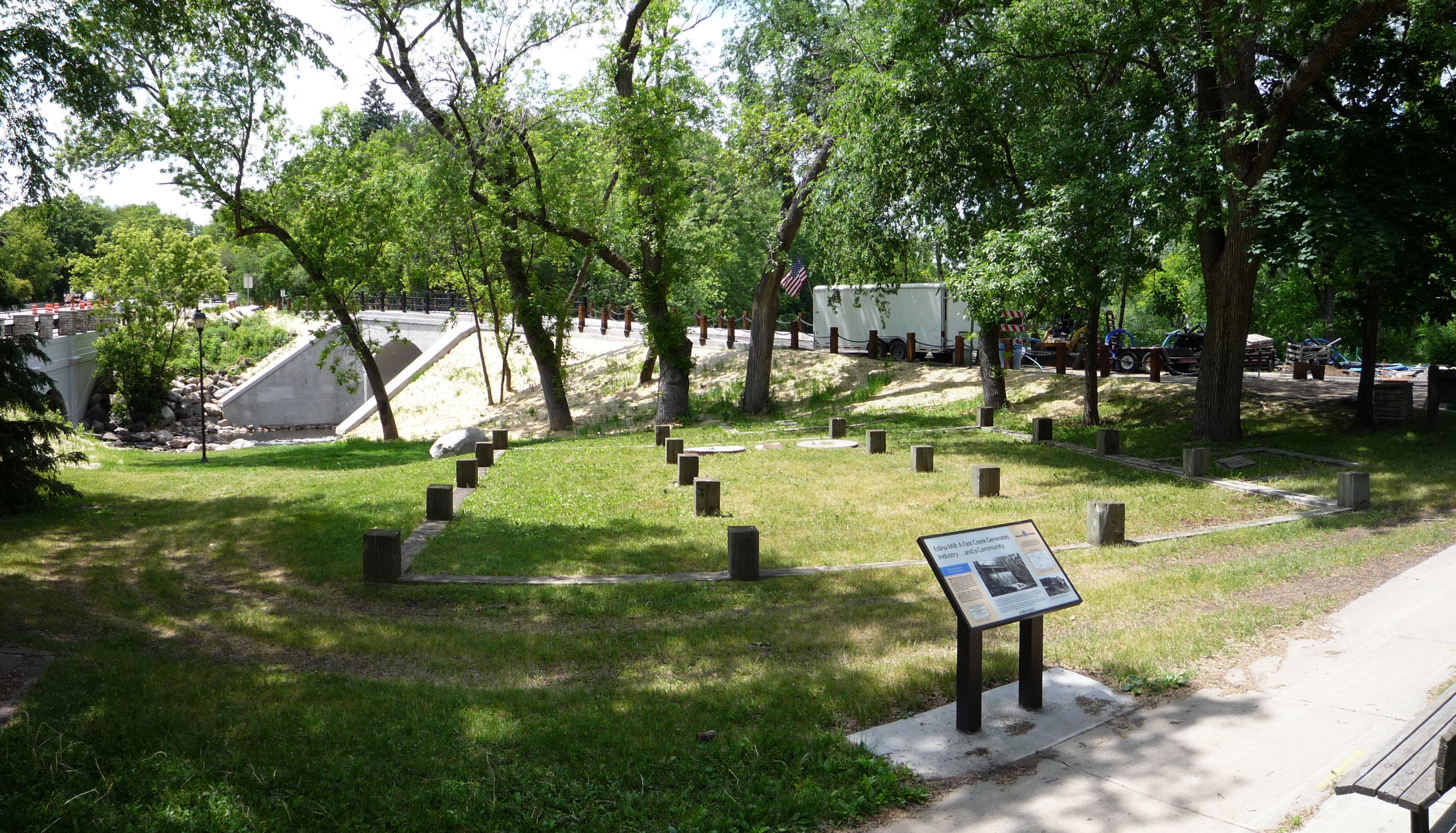
The ruins of the Edina Mill; Minnehaha Creek is in the background.

The Edina Mill was one of the first of six gristmills to be built on the Minnehaha Creek in Hennepin County, Minnesota between 1855 and 1876. Located in present-day Edina, the mill site was discovered during an expedition from Fort Snelling to Lake Minnetonka in 1822. Although the original mill structure was demolished in 1932, its former site is preserved with foundation markers and informational exhibits.

== History ==
In the mid-1850s, small gristmills began to spring up along several creeks that ran through the land where much of the area's grain was grown. This was a direct result of the fact that prior to these mills, farmers had to haul their grain in horse-drawn wagons over long distances to the mills at Saint Anthony Falls along the Mississippi River.

== Waterville Mills ==
In 1856, Jacob Elliot, Captain Richard Strout, Levi M. Stewart, and Joseph Cushman purchased land and constructed a mill on the Minnehaha Creek in present-day Edina. The mill and the tiny settlement that sprang up around it were named Waterville Mills. Pioneer farmers brought their wheat, rye, oats, barley and corn from as far away as Excelsior and St. Anthony. In 1859, the mill was resold to William Rheem and Jonathan T. Grimes who renamed it the Red Mill. They kept the mill running constantly during the Civil War making flour requisitioned by the government for the Union Army. In 1867, the mill was again resold to Daniel H. Buckwalter who again changed the name of the mill to the Buckwalter Mill.

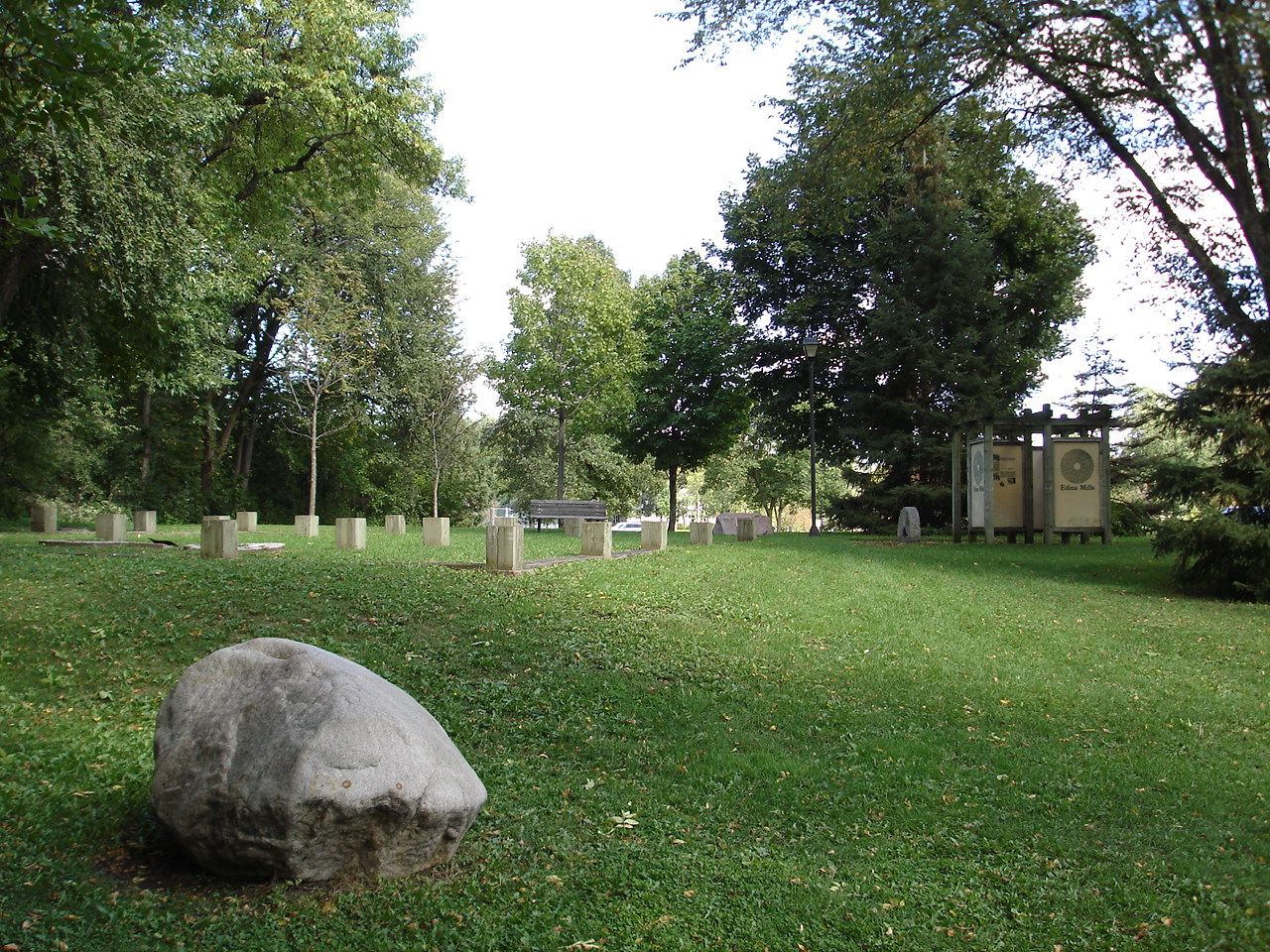
The present day Edina Mill site off 50th Street

== New Name ==
After only two years Buckwalter sold the mill to a Scotsman named Andrew Craik in 1869. He gave the mill and the city of Edina its present name. Edina was a nickname for his birthplace in Edinburgh, Scotland, that appeared in a poem written by Scottish poet Robert Burns. Along with the new name, Craik also brought two new products, oatmeal and pearl barley. The Edina Mill was the first in the state of Minnesota to make them and for many years it was the only place in the area to get them. In 1875, George Millam, a Scottish miller hired by Craik shortly after he bought it, purchased the mill from Craik and converted from a wooden overshot water wheel to turbine power. By 1879, three turbines drove the millstones and other milling machinery.

== Demise ==
The demise of the mill began in 1895 when a dam was built on the east shore of Gray's Bay on Lake Minnetonka. This dam severely cut the water flow of the Minnehaha Creek, turning it from a racing river to a meandering brook. A last attempt was made to keep the mill running and for a time, a gas engine was used to grind feed for livestock. However, it didn't work out and the mill came to a halt never to start again.

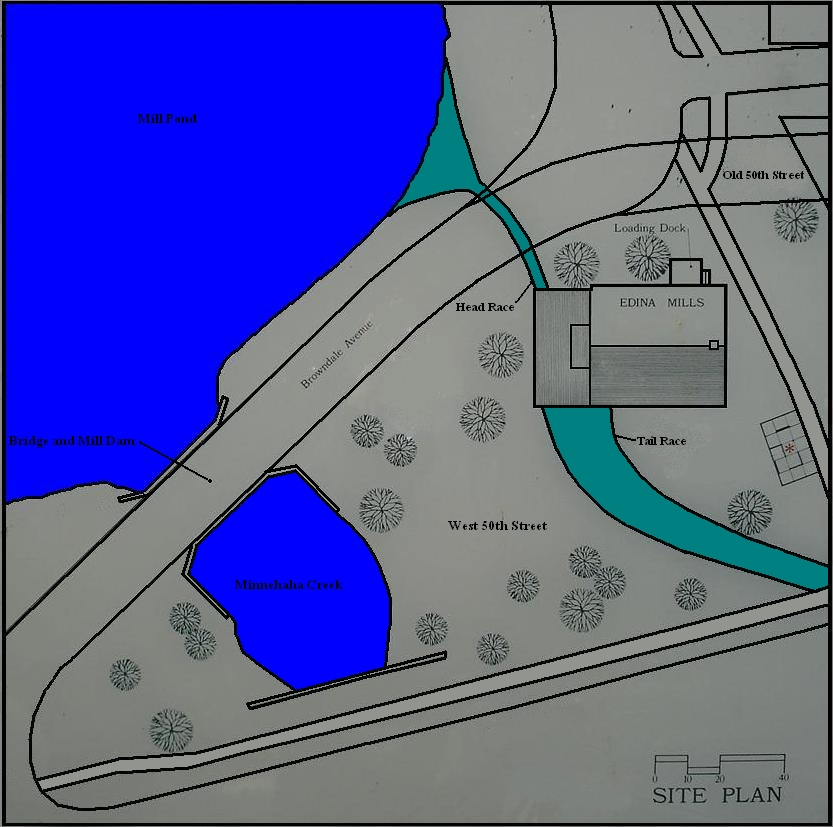
The Edina Mill site circa 1920s including today's infrastructure

The mill changed hands one more time as Henry F. Brown bought the mill from Millam in 1889. He used the mill to store grain until 1922 when the Thorpe Brothers Realtors bought the site for the development of a new residential community called the Country Club District. On December 1, 1932, despite efforts to preserve it as an historic landmark, the old mill was demolished.

== Archeology ==
In the summer of 1977, an archeological dig at the old mill site located the exact outlines of the mill's foundation and found several remnants of the mill's equipment. After the search for the artifacts was completed, the mill site was re-landscaped and identified with informational exhibits.
