= Edina, Minnesota =

City in the United States

- City
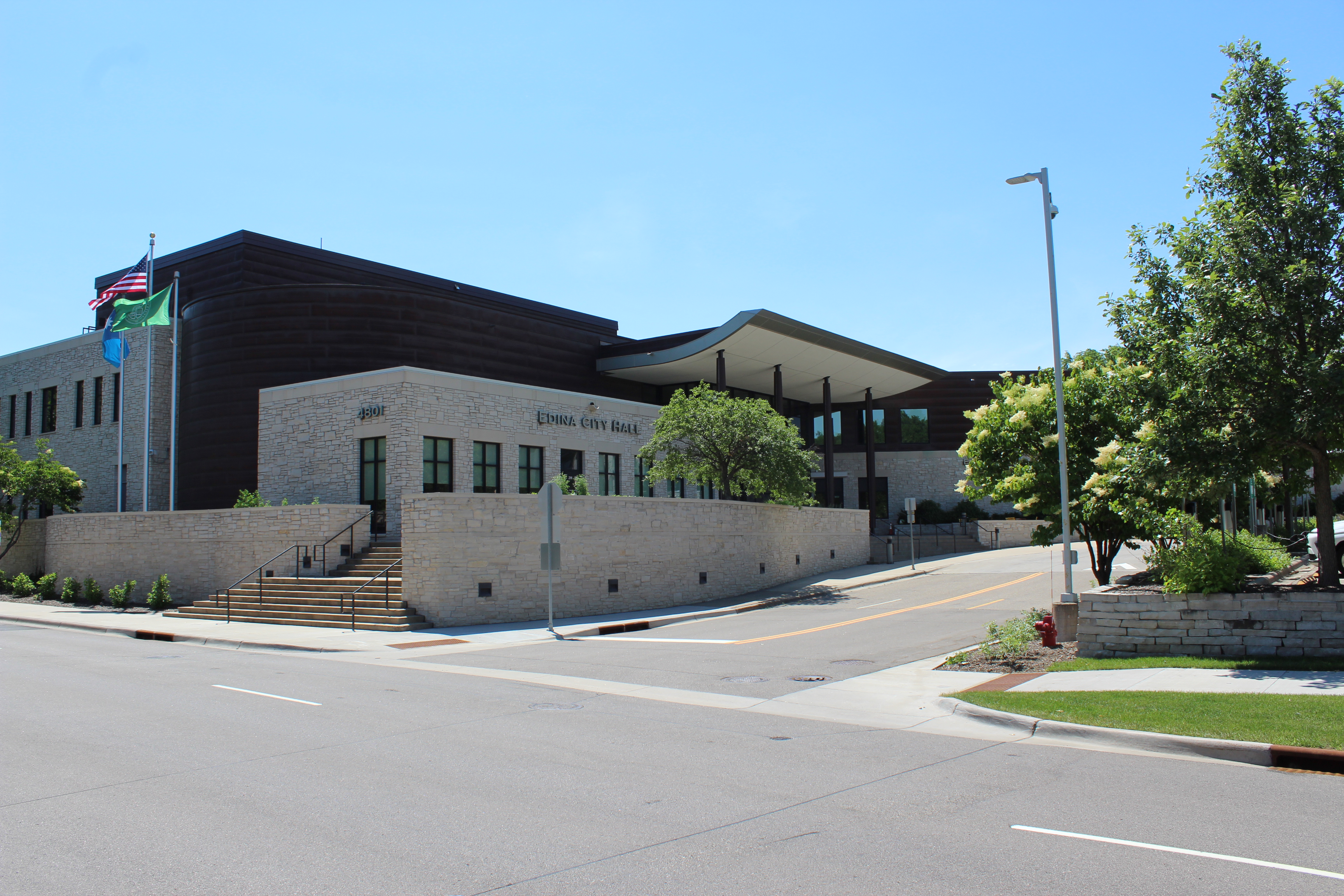
- Edina city hall, rebuilt in 2004

- Flag Seal
- Motto: "For Living, Learning, Raising Families & Doing Business"
- Location of Edina within Hennepin County, Minnesota

- Location within Minnesota Location within the United States
- Coordinates: 44°53′44″N 93°21′17″W
- Country: United States
- State: Minnesota
- County: Hennepin
- Founded: 1860s
- Incorporated: 1888

Government
  - Mayor: James B. Hovland (DFL)

Area
  - City: 15.96 sq mi (41.34 km^{2})
  - Land: 15.46 sq mi (40.03 km^{2})
  - Water: 0.51 sq mi (1.31 km^{2}) 3.26%
- Elevation: 922 ft (281 m)

Population (2020)
  - City: 53,494
  - Estimate (2025): 54,356
  - Rank: US: 766th MN: 19th
  - Density: 3,461.0/sq mi (1,336.31/km^{2})
  - Metro: 3,693,729 (US: 16th)
- Demonym(s): Edinans (official); Cake Eaters (nickname)
- Time zone: UTC−6 (Central)
  - Summer (DST): UTC−5 (CDT)
- ZIP codes: 55410, 55416, 55424, 55435, 55436, 55439, 55343
- Area code: 952
- FIPS code: 27-18188
- GNIS feature ID: 0643177
- Website: edinamn.gov

Edina (locally /iːˈdaɪnə/ ee-DY-nə, /ɪˈdaɪnə/ ih-DY-nə) is a city in Hennepin County, Minnesota, United States and a first-ring suburb of Minneapolis. The population was 53,494 at the 2020 census, making it the 18th most populous city in Minnesota.

Edina began as a small farming and milling community along Minnehaha Creek in the 1860s and became one of Minneapolis's first incorporated suburbs in 1888. After years of being a streetcar suburb, Edina saw expanded development as a car-centric suburb in the 1950s and 1960s.

The city is known for its public schools, shopping, parks, and the United States' oldest indoor mall, Southdale Center.

== History ==
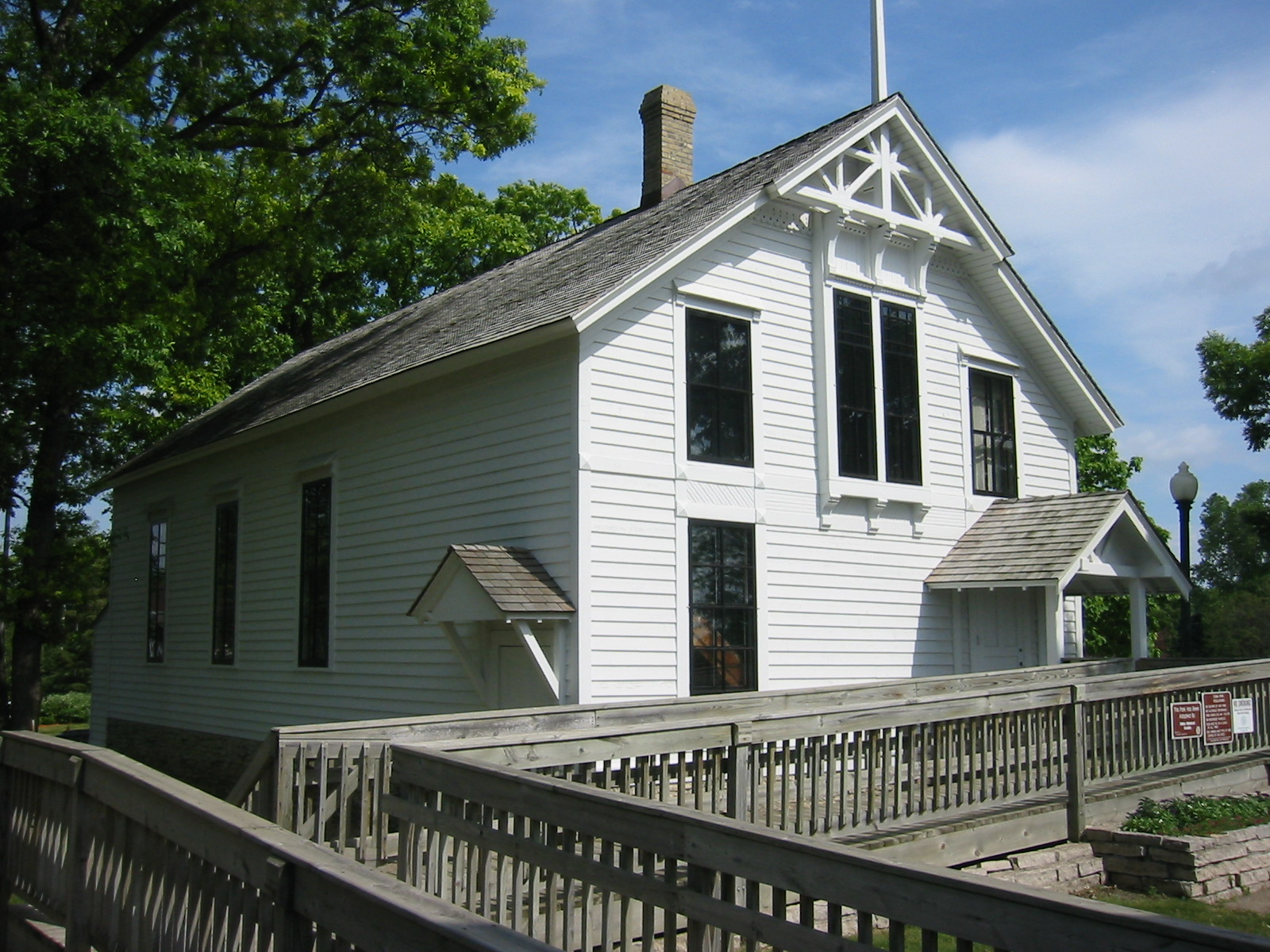
Minnehaha Grange Hall

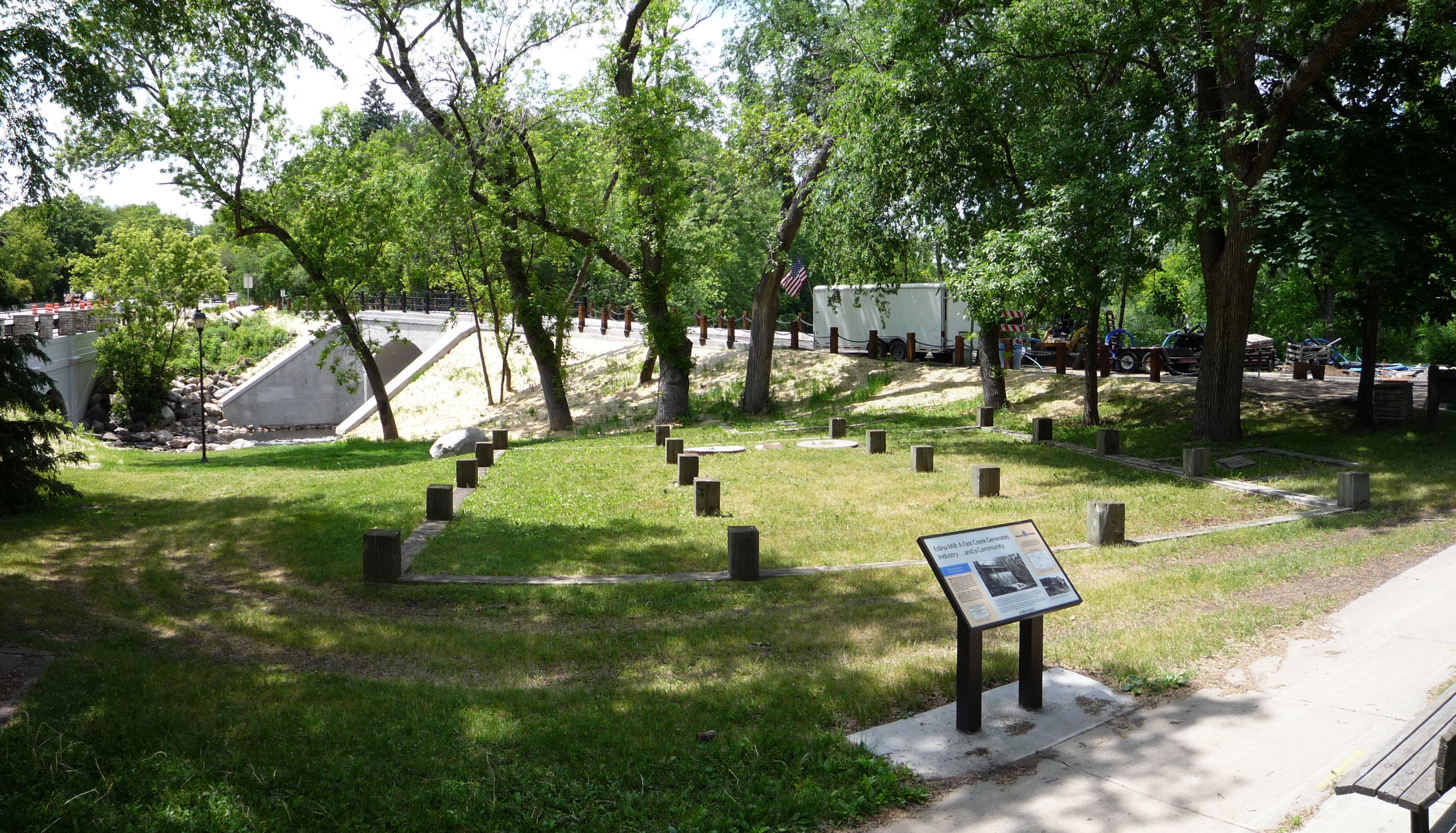
Ruins of Edina Mill next to Minnehaha Creek

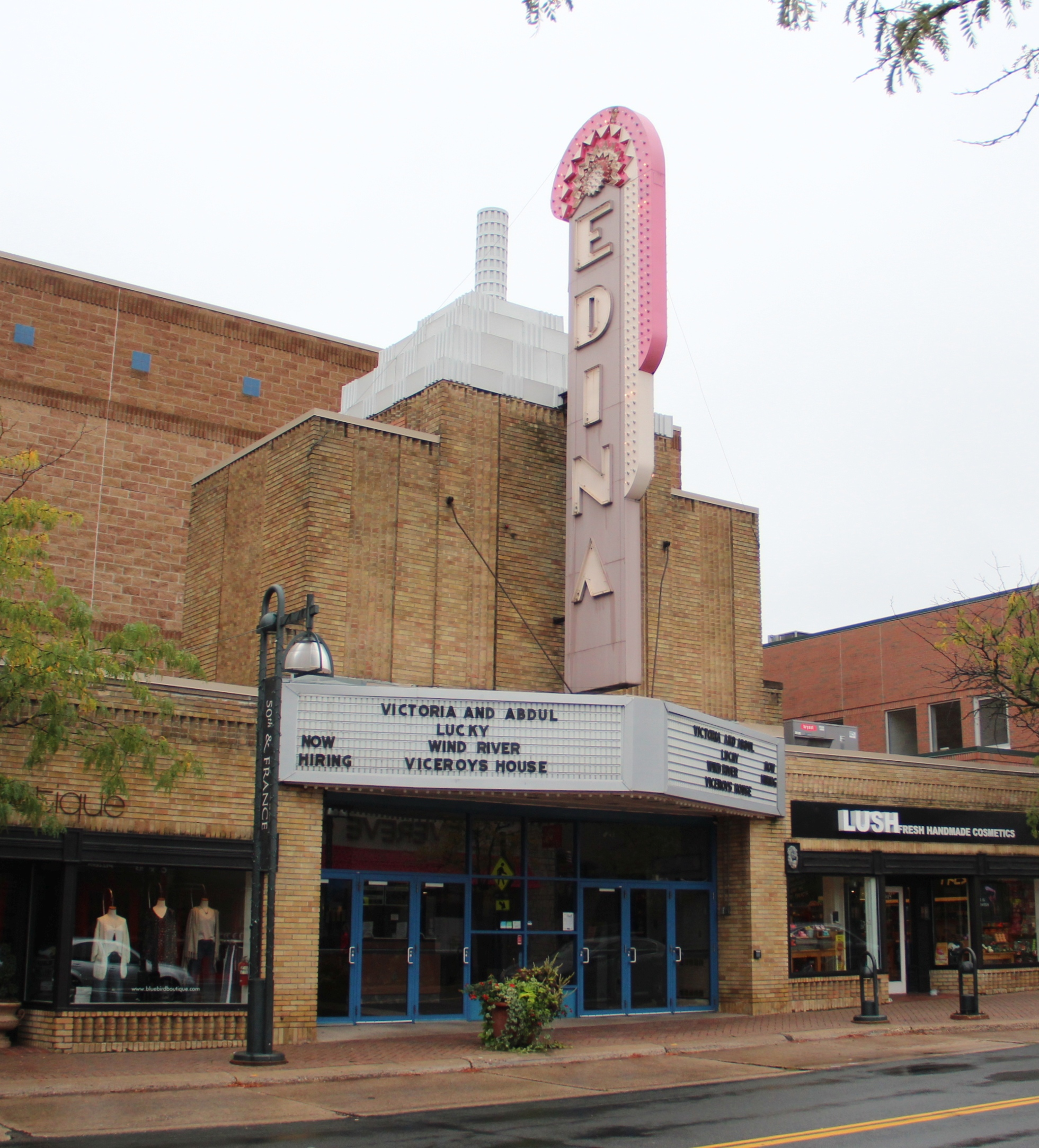
Edina Cinema, a theater in downtown Edina that opened in 1934

=== Settlement ===
Edina began as part of Richfield Township, Minnesota. By the 1870s, 17 families, most of them immigrating as a result of the Great Famine of Ireland, had come to Minnesota and claimed land in the southwest section of what was then Richfield Township. They were followed by settlers from New England and Germany, who claimed additional land near Minnehaha Creek. The Baird and Grimes neighborhoods (both listed on the National Register of Historic Places) and the Country Club District (then known as Waterville Mills) in northeastern Edina were among the first areas to be established. The area then known as the Cahill Settlement, at West 70th Street and Cahill Road, was also an early community center and the home of Cahill School.

In 1888, the township's residents held a meeting to consider founding a new village, thus separating themselves from Richfield Township. The idea was accepted and a committee was established to oversee the transition.

=== Naming ===
After the decision was made to form a new village, debate ensued about the new village's name. Several town meetings were held in the Minnehaha Grange Hall, during which the names Hennepin Park, Westfield, and Edina were suggested. Minutes taken by Henry F. Brown, a farmer and future owner (1889) of the Edina Mill, are summarized as follows:

A long debate ensued with regard to the name by which the corporation shall be called. A motion was made and passed to reconsider the vote taken at the previous meeting of the name of the proposed village, Westfield. Another motion was then made by Andrew Craik to call the proposed village Edina (upon moving to the township in 1869 from Edinburgh, he bought and renamed the mill to the Edina Mill). Before the motion could be decided, James A. Bull, a member of the five person committee, made another motion to adjourn, which was seconded by the majority. However, the chairman of the meeting called this motion out of order, at which time disorder ensued with Baird, Wilson, Ryan and Bull declaring their intent to no longer serve as members of the committee if a gag law was to prevail. During this heated moment the meeting became somewhat boisterous until, after a few minutes order was restored. Seeing that no more work could be done at this time, a final motion was made and passed to reschedule the meeting to a future date.

At the next meeting, the name Edina was chosen with a vote of 47 for and 42 against.

A prevailing myth about the decision to name the new village Edina is that two opposing communities—the Irish Cahill community and the Scottish Mill community—fought about whether to give the community an Irish name (Killarney Lakes) or a Scottish one (Edina). But the 1860 census indicates that there were no Scottish people in Edina in 1860, and only a couple were present at the time of Edina's founding (1888).

The name "Edina" may also come from the language of the nearby Dakota tribe. The word Dakota: Idéna means "to catch fire."

=== Morningside ===
The first suburban development in Edina occurred during the early 1900s in Morningside, a neighborhood in the northeastern part of the village. As Morningside grew, conflict arose between its residents who wanted more city services, and the residents of the rest of the village who wanted to maintain Edina's rural character. As a result of that conflict, Morningside seceded from Edina in 1920 and became a separate village. In 1966, however, the Village of Morningside once again became part of Edina.

=== Early settlement ===
Edina was not the first settlement in its location. According to historian Deborah Morse-Kahn, the Quaker village that existed where Edina would be built included African American families of Civil War veterans and freed slaves "became very involved in community life—especially as farmland owners, civic and cultural leaders." At the November 1898 general election, J. Frank Wheaton, a Republican African American, was elected to the Minnesota House of Representatives representing District 42, which included all of Edina. Wheaton beat his white Democratic opponent in every Minneapolis city ward and in every village within the legislative district, including Edina, even though the legislative district had only approximately 100 African American residents out of a total of 40,000 residents.

=== Early development ===
In the early 20th century suburban development brought discriminatory policies that led to nearly all of the African Americans who had been living in Edina to move away.

Historian James W. Loewen described the suburb as a sundown town. Researchers point in particular to Samuel Thorpe's development of the Country Club Historic District, which used deed restrictions as means to exclude non-whites, stating explicitly that:

No lot shall ever be sold, conveyed, leased, or rented to any person other than one of the white or Caucasian race, nor shall any lot ever be used or occupied by any person other than one of the white or Caucasian race, except such as may be serving as domestics for the owner or tenant of said lot, while said owner or tenant is residing thereon.

— James W. Loewen, Sundown Towns: A Hidden Dimension of American Racism

Other developments, like that built by N. P. Dodge Corporation just a mile away, followed suit in attempting to protect land values through racial policies. Though the Supreme Court ruled these kinds of discriminatory housing clauses unenforceable in its Shelley v. Kraemer decision of 1948, reports of discrimination persisted through the 1950s and 1960s. According to the Edina Historical Society's story about the first black family in Morningside (then a separate village) in 1960, attempts to keep them out included tactics like trying "to get [their] lot condemned for drainage." In response, then-mayor Ken Joyce wrote a note dismissing the drainage concern and challenging citizens "to live the Golden Rule". Shortly thereafter the village voted in favor of inclusion.

Jewish residents were also affected by exclusionary deed covenants. In the 1960s, some residents boasted that Edina had "Not one Negro and not one Jew."

The history of exclusion in Edina, and perceived privilege those living in Edina gave rise to the nickname "Cake Eater," which appears to be an allusion to Marie Antionette. Edina has grown more demographically diverse in the 21st century, and has embraced the regional epithet in good humor, with the Edina Hockey Association hosting the annual "Cake Eater Classic" Tournament for more than two decades.

== Geography ==
According to the United States Census Bureau, the city has a total area of 15.97 square miles (41.36 km^{2}), of which 15.45 square miles (40.02 km^{2}) is land and 0.52 square miles (1.35 km^{2}) is water. Residential areas comprise the largest portion of the city, which is now more than 95 percent developed.

Within Edina are many different neighborhoods; Highlands, Indian Hills, Morningside, Country Club District, Cahill Village, Chapel Hill, South Harriet Park, Interlachen, Rolling Green, Presidents, Sunnyslope, White Oaks, Parkwood Knolls, Braemar Hills, Birchcrest, Dewey Hill and Hilldale.

== Demographics ==
Historical population
| Census | Pop. | Note | %± |
|---|---|---|---|
| 1890 | 531 | | — |
| 1900 | 749 | | 41.1% |
| 1910 | 1,101 | | 47.0% |
| 1920 | 1,833 | | 66.5% |
| 1930 | 3,138 | | 71.2% |
| 1940 | 5,855 | | 86.6% |
| 1950 | 9,744 | | 66.4% |
| 1960 | 30,482 | | 212.8% |
| 1970 | 44,031 | | 44.4% |
| 1980 | 46,073 | | 4.6% |
| 1990 | 46,075 | | 0.0% |
| 2000 | 47,425 | | 2.9% |
| 2010 | 47,941 | | 1.1% |
| 2020 | 53,494 | | 11.6% |
| 2025 (est.) | 54,356 | | 1.6% |
U.S. Decennial Census; 2020 Census

=== Racial and ethnic composition ===
Edina, Minnesota - Demographic Profile (NH = Non-Hispanic)
| Race / Ethnicity | Pop 2000 | Pop 2010 | Pop 2020 | % 2000 | % 2010 | % 2020 |
|---|---|---|---|---|---|---|
| White alone (NH) | 44,367 | 41,535 | 42,158 | 93.55% | 86.64% | 78.81% |
| Black or African American alone (NH) | 527 | 1,424 | 1,892 | 1.11% | 2.97% | 3.54% |
| Native American or Alaska Native alone (NH) | 61 | 78 | 91 | 0.18% | 0.16% | 0.17% |
| Asian alone (NH) | 1,408 | 2,914 | 4,809 | 2.97% | 6.08% | 8.99% |
| Pacific Islander alone (NH) | 11 | 16 | 7 | 0.02% | 0.03% | 0.01% |
| Some Other Race alone (NH) | 48 | 88 | 231 | 0.10% | 0.18% | 0.43% |
| Mixed Race/Multi-Racial (NH) | 464 | 785 | 2,304 | 0.98% | 1.64% | 4.31% |
| Hispanic or Latino (any race) | 539 | 1,101 | 2,002 | 1.14% | 2.30% | 3.74% |
| Total | 47,425 | 47,941 | 53,494 | 100.00% | 100.00% | 100.00% |

Note: the US Census treats Hispanic/Latino as an ethnic category. This table excludes Latinos from the racial categories and assigns them to a separate category. Hispanics/Latinos can be of any race.

=== 2020 census ===
As of the 2020 census, Edina had a population of 53,494. The median age was 43.4 years. 23.1% of residents were under the age of 18 and 22.2% of residents were 65 years of age or older. For every 100 females there were 90.8 males, and for every 100 females age 18 and over there were 86.7 males age 18 and over.

100.0% of residents lived in urban areas, while 0.0% lived in rural areas.

There were 22,093 households in Edina, of which 29.9% had children under the age of 18 living in them. Of all households, 53.9% were married-couple households, 14.2% were households with a male householder and no spouse or partner present, and 27.5% were households with a female householder and no spouse or partner present. About 31.3% of all households were made up of individuals and 17.6% had someone living alone who was 65 years of age or older.

There were 23,861 housing units, of which 7.4% were vacant. The homeowner vacancy rate was 1.4% and the rental vacancy rate was 10.0%.

Racial composition as of the 2020 census
| Race | Number | Percent |
|---|---|---|
| White | 42,574 | 79.6% |
| Black or African American | 1,911 | 3.6% |
| American Indian and Alaska Native | 130 | 0.2% |
| Asian | 4,826 | 9.0% |
| Native Hawaiian and Other Pacific Islander | 8 | 0.0% |
| Some other race | 831 | 1.6% |
| Two or more races | 3,214 | 6.0% |
| Hispanic or Latino (of any race) | 2,002 | 3.7% |

=== 2010 census ===
As of the census of 2010, there were 47,941 people, 20,672 households, and 12,918 families residing in the city. The population density was 3,103.0 inhabitants per square mile (1,198.1/km^{2}). There were 22,560 housing units at an average density of 1,460.2 per square mile (563.8/km^{2}). The racial makeup of the city was 88.1% White, 3.0% African American, 0.2% Native American, 6.1% Asian, 0.7% from other races, and 1.8% from two or more races. Hispanic or Latino residents of any race were 2.3% of the population.

There were 20,672 households, of which 29.4% had children under the age of 18 living with them, 53.7% were married couples living together, 6.4% had a female householder with no husband present, 2.3% had a male householder with no wife present, and 37.5% were non-families. 33.1% of all households were made up of individuals, and 18% had someone living alone who was 65 years of age or older. The average household size was 2.31 and the average family size was 2.98.

The median age in the city was 45.2 years. 24.2% of residents were under the age of 18; 4.5% were between the ages of 18 and 24; 21% were from 25 to 44; 29.6% were from 45 to 64; and 20.7% were 65 years of age or older. The gender makeup of the city was 46.6% male and 53.4% female.

According to 2012–2016 estimates, the median household income was $91,847 and per capita income was $65,245. The median value of owner-occupied housing units was $424,500.

=== Religion ===
- Edina hosts Venkateswara Temple, a Hindu temple, for the over 40,000 Hindus residing in the Minneapolis-St Paul area.
- Christ Presbyterian Church is a congregation within ECO: A Covenant Order of Evangelical Presbyterians with 5,388 members in 2012. CPC was founded in 1956. During Roger Anderson's ministry, the church began to grow rapidly. CPC became the largest Presbyterian congregation in the upper Midwest, and one of the largest Presbyterian churches in the nation, with membership passing 1,700. The former senior pastor, John Crosby, led CPC to be a congregation of over 5,000. In 2006, the church celebrated the 50th anniversary. The church was a leader in the movement to establish ECO as a breakaway movement from the Presbyterian Church (USA).
- Edina Community Lutheran Church (ECLC) is a progressive Lutheran congregation within the Evangelical Lutheran Church in America that was founded in Edina on September 23, 1948, and has been a Reconciling in Christ congregation since 1985. In September 2023, the Church celebrated the 75th anniversary of its founding. A ECLC June 25, 2023 Sunday service live stream went viral online when during the Sunday service co-pastor Anna Helgen led the congregation in a “sparkle creed” prayer in honor of LGBT Pride Month in which God is described as “nonbinary” and Jesus as having “two dads.”

=== Politics ===
United States presidential election results for Edina, Minnesota
| Year | Republican | | Democratic | | Third party(ies) | |
| Year | No. | % | No. | % | No. | % |
|---|---|---|---|---|---|---|
| 2000 | 15,730 | 51.49% | 13,366 | 43.75% | 1,452 | 4.75% |
| 2004 | 15,277 | 48.25% | 16,090 | 50.82% | 292 | 0.92% |
| 2008 | 13,670 | 43.49% | 17,399 | 55.36% | 361 | 1.15% |
| 2012 | 14,618 | 46.04% | 16,752 | 52.76% | 380 | 1.20% |
| 2016 | 10,203 | 32.22% | 18,877 | 59.62% | 2,583 | 8.16% |
| 2020 | 10,800 | 30.14% | 24,351 | 67.95% | 686 | 1.91% |
| 2024 | 10,178 | 29.28% | 23,623 | 67.95% | 963 | 2.77% |

== Economy ==
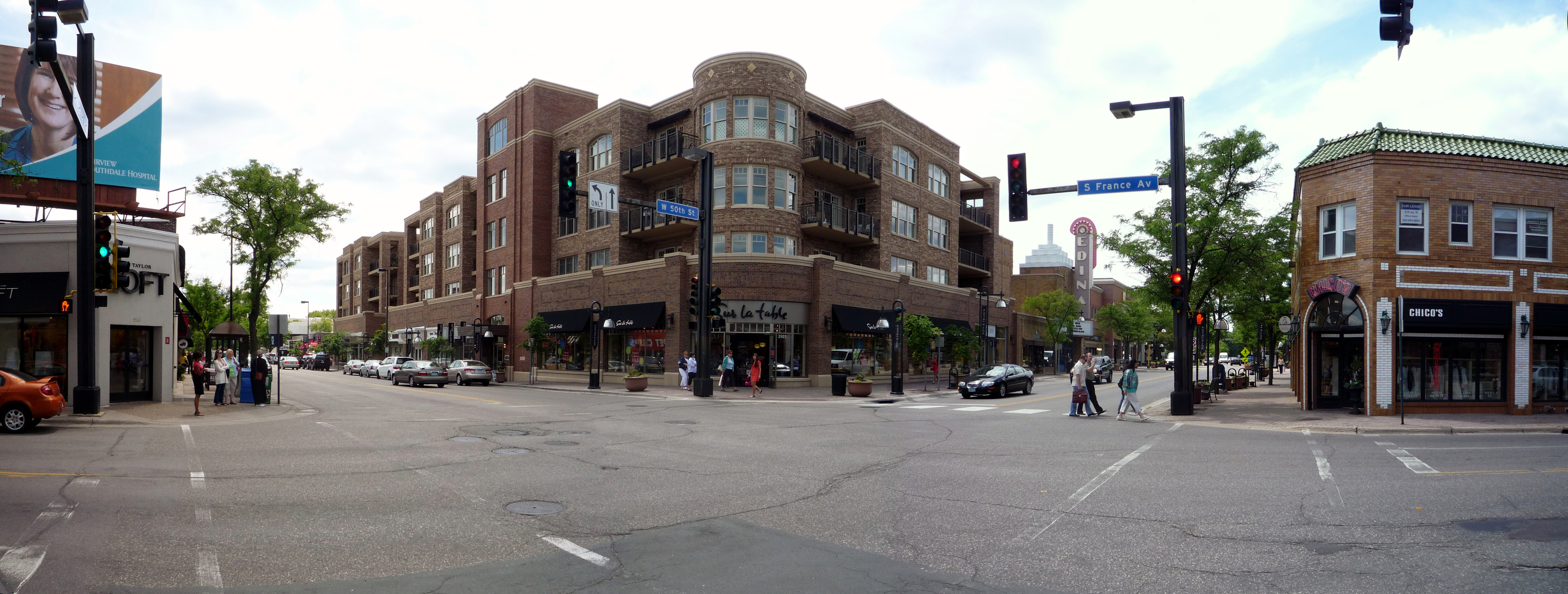
50th & France

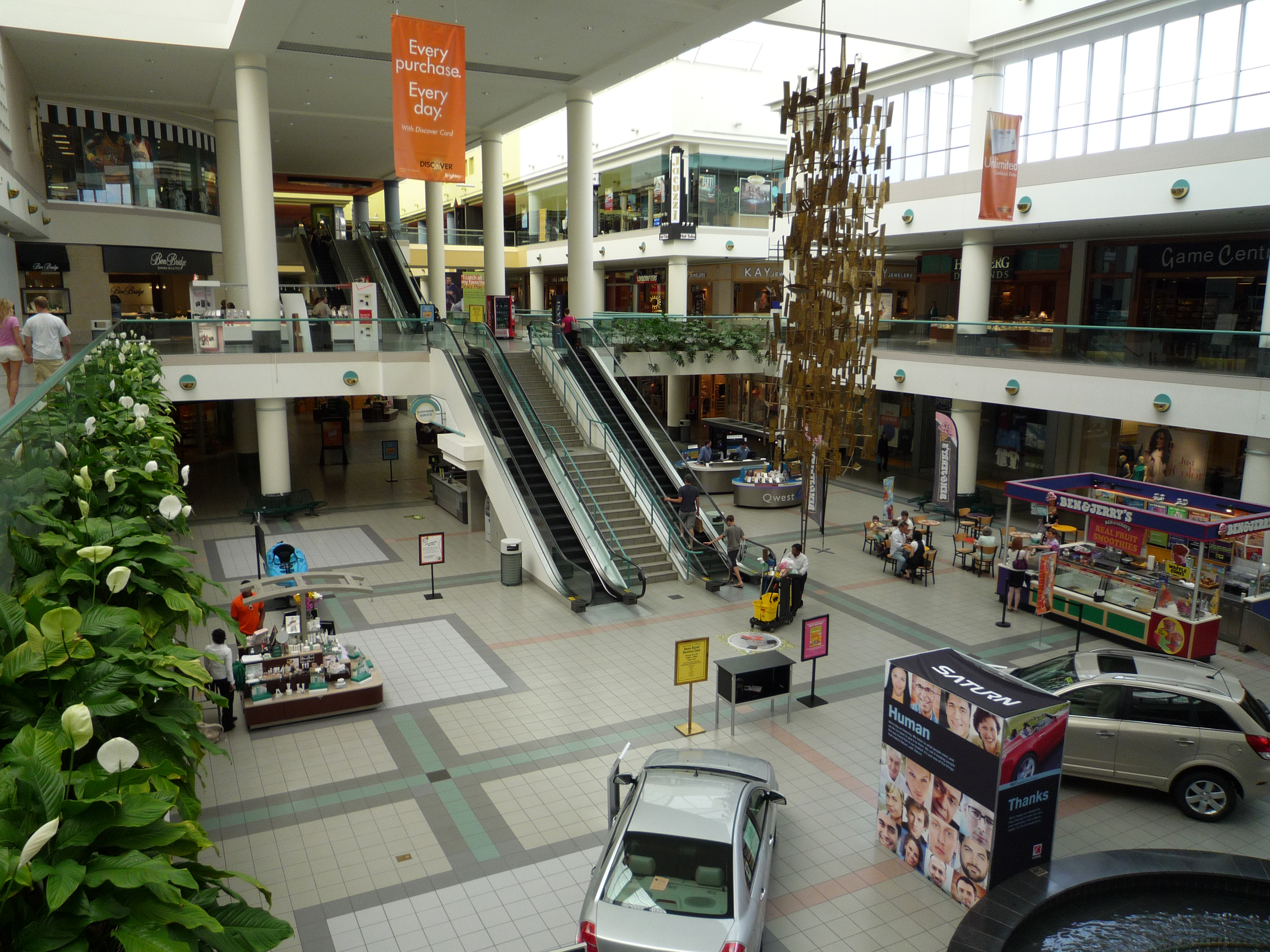
Southdale Center

Edina serves as headquarters for several large companies: Jerry's Foods, Lund Food Holdings, Edina Realty, Regis Corporation, Orange Julius and Evereve.

The town's most notable shopping centers are Southdale Center, Galleria Edina, and 50th & France, which is shared with Minneapolis.

According to the city's Comprehensive Annual Financial Report for the fiscal year ended December 31, 2015, the top ten largest employers in the city are: Fairview Southdale Hospital, Edina Public Schools, the City of Edina, BI Worldwide, Regis, Barr Engineering, Lund Food Holdings, International Dairy Queen Inc., SunOpta, Edina Realty, and FilmTec Corporation, respectively.

== Sports ==
Due in part to its strong boys and girls ice hockey programs, Edina was named by ESPN in 2020 as the "center of the center" of the American ice hockey universe. Since 2016, Edina's Braemar Ice Rink has hosted Da Beauty League, a 4-on-4 ice hockey league with rosters made up of current NHL, AHL, ECHL, and college hockey players wishing to maintain their offseason playing shape.

In December 1979, the first bandy game in the USA was played at Lewis Park Bandy Rink in Edina. It was a friendly game between the Swedish junior national team and Swedish club team Brobergs IF.

== Parks and recreation ==
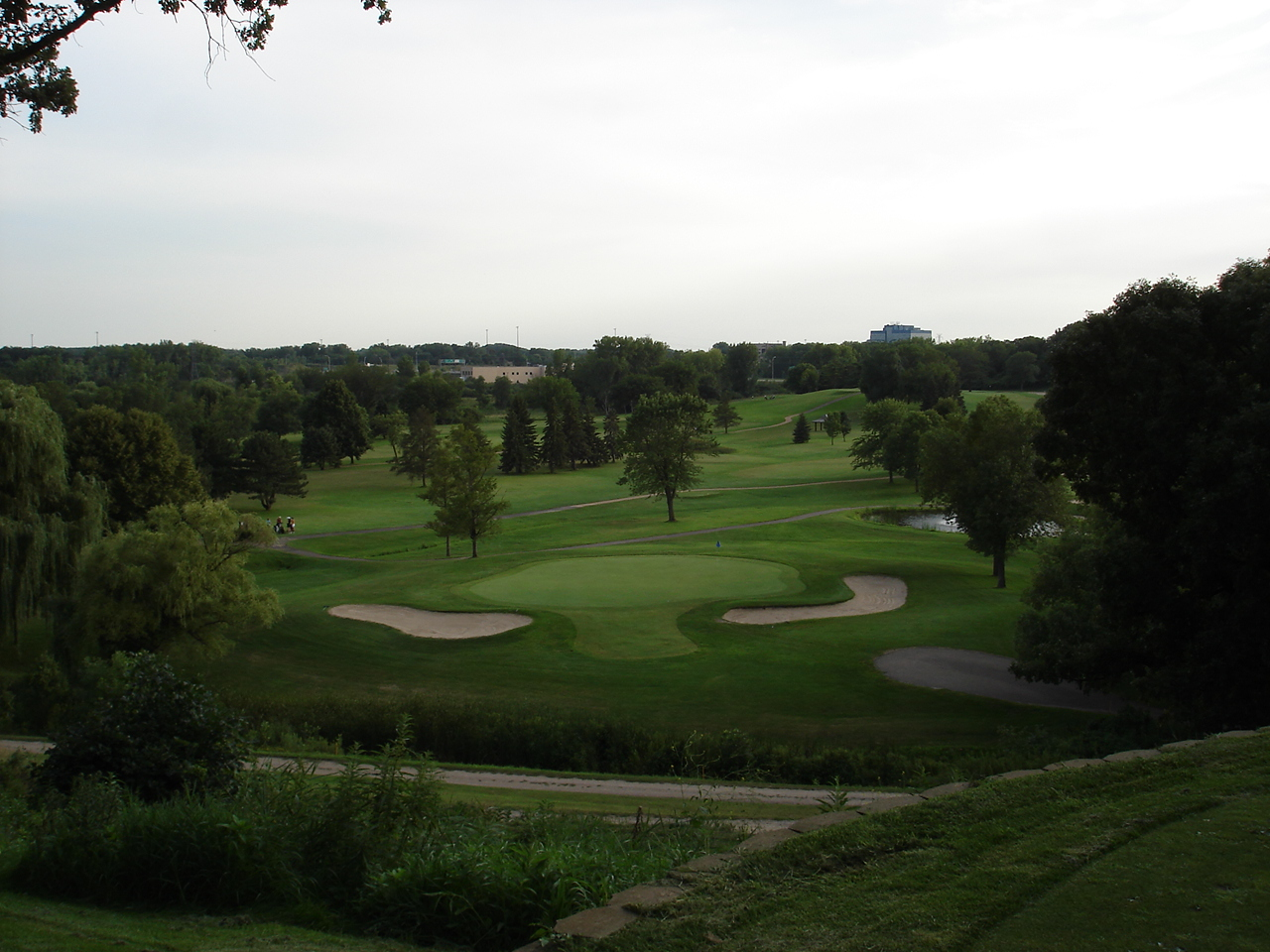
Overlooking the 12th hole on Braemar Golf Course

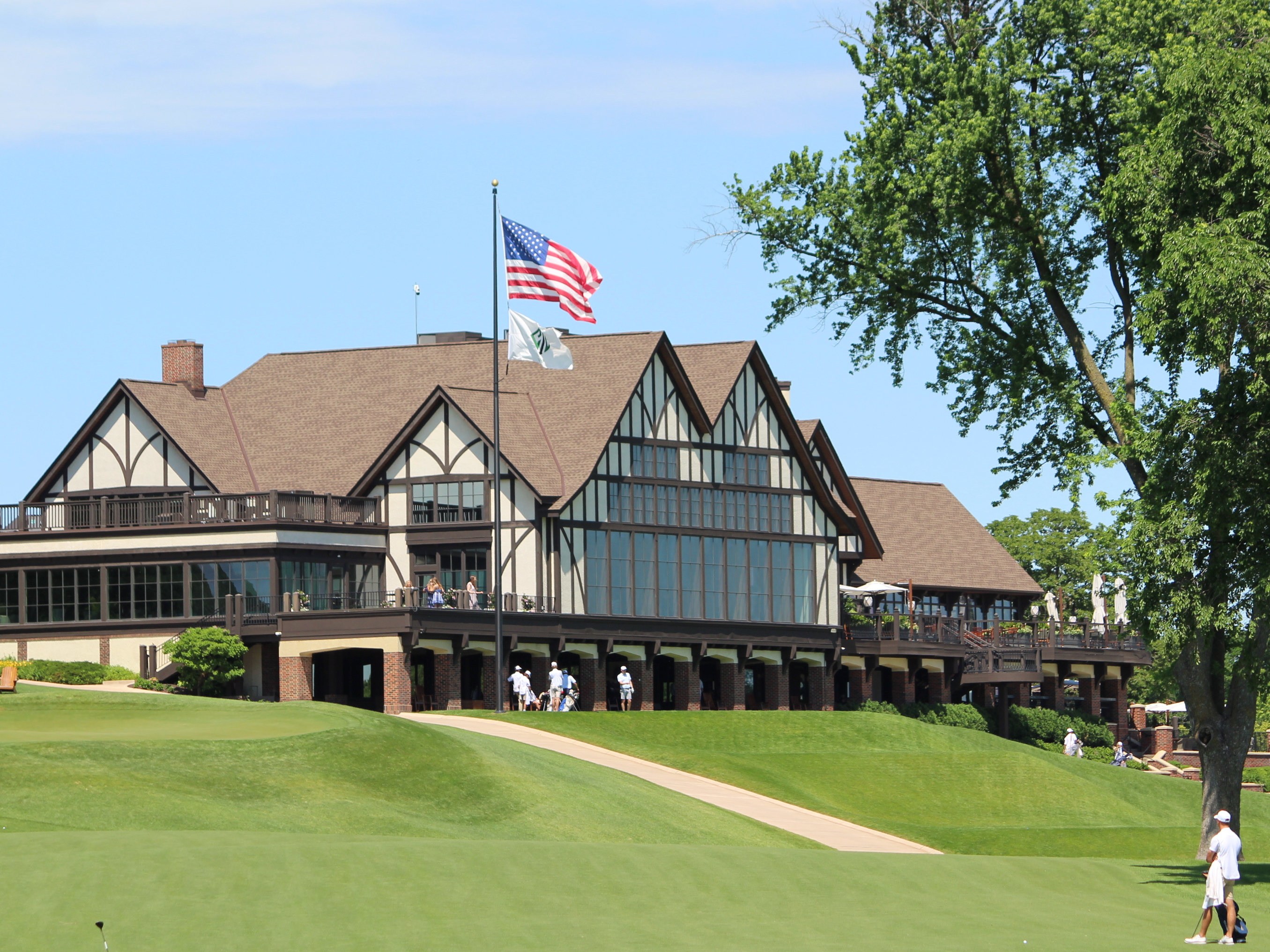
Interlachen Country Club clubhouse

=== Parks ===
Edina's parkland and open space total more than 1,550 acres (6.3 km^{2}). The Edina Park and Recreation Department oversees 44 parks, which include amenities such as baseball, football and soccer fields; softball diamonds; basketball and tennis courts; outdoor skating rinks; playground equipment for young children; and picnic shelters. The department also maintains eight miles (13 km) of scenic pathways for bicycling, walking, jogging, cross-country skiing and snowshoeing.

Besides overseeing the parks, the Edina Park & Recreation Department is also responsible for the operation of 10 arts, community, and recreation facilities within the city including Braemar Golf Course, Braemar Ice Rink, Centennial Lakes Park, and Edinborough Park.

Three Rivers Park District, Hennepin County's regional park board, operates the Nine Mile Creek Regional Trail through Edina.

=== Waterways ===
Two prominent Twin Cities waterways, Minnehaha Creek and Nine Mile Creek, make their way through Edina on their ways to the Mississippi and Minnesota Rivers respectively. Both are sites for major regional parks and trails.

=== Country clubs ===
There are two country clubs located in Edina, the Edina Country Club and the Interlachen Country Club.

== Education ==
=== Public schools ===
Edina Public Schools is the public school district (ISD 273) that serves Edina. It enrolls approximately 8,500 K–12 students and is served by 1,139 teachers and support staff.

Edina has one high school, Edina High School. The area is served by two middle schools: (South View Middle School and Valley View Middle School) and six elementary schools (Concord, Creek Valley, Cornelia, Highlands, Countryside, and Normandale).

=== Private schools ===
There are two private schools in Edina: Our Lady of Grace Catholic School and Golden Years Montessori.

=== Colleges ===
Minnesota State University, Mankato has a satellite campus in Edina.

== Infrastructure ==
=== Transportation ===
Many major highways run through or are close to Edina, making it readily accessible to those within the metropolitan area. Minnesota State Highways 62 and 100 divide the City into four sections. U.S. Route 169 and Minnesota State Highway 100 extend north and south. Interstate 494 and Minnesota State Highway 62 extend east and west.

==== Transit ====
Before streetcar service was abandoned in 1954, the Twin City Rapid Transit Company's Lake Minnetonka Line went through Edina paralleling 44th Street on dedicated right-of-way. After streetcar service was abandoned, the right-of-way was developed as single family housing.

===== Bus service =====
Metro Transit, the Twin Cities regional transit authority, operates daytime buses in Edina, primarily along France Avenue and through business parks along Interstate 494. Edina's Southdale Transit Center is one of the southwest Twin Cities primary transit hubs.

The E Line, an arterial BRT route opened in 2025 and travels from the University of Minnesota through Downtown Minneapolis and Uptown to the Southdale Transit Center in Edina.

===== Commuter rail =====
The Dan Patch Line and successor Minneapolis, Northfield and Southern Railway operated interurban service through Edina until 1942. Although in poor condition and rated for speeds less than 35 mph, the tracks are still used by freight trains. Under the Dan Patch Corridor proposal, commuter trains would operate between Minneapolis and Northfield with a station in Edina. A feasibility study was conducted in 2000 and found that ridership would be high but there would be a significant cost to upgrade the corridor for commuter trains. Due to this and strong opposition from residents living near the rail line, the proposal was put on hold until other commuter rail lines could be built. In 2002 a legislative gag order was placed on the project, which forbid the Metropolitan Council, MnDOT, and county rail authorities from discussing, studying, and building commuter rail on the Dan Patch Line. In 2017 the Edina City Council conducted a study on the pros and cons of passenger rail on the Dan Patch Line. The conclusion was to not pursue passenger rail at that time (as of 2018). The legislative gag order was repealed by the Minnesota Legislature on May 21, 2023.

== Notable people ==
The following is a list of notable people who were either born in, lived in, are current residents of, or are otherwise closely associated with the city of Edina:

- David W. Anderson – founder of Famous Dave's restaurant chain
- Lynsey Bartilson – actress
- Kieffer Bellows – NHL player for the Philadelphia Flyers
- Dorothy Benham – Miss America, 1977
- Paris Bennett – American Idol contestant
- David Bloom – NBC television journalist
- Terri Bonoff – former member of the Minnesota Senate
- Ward Brehm – chairman and founder, The Brehm Group, Inc.
- Bud Brisbois – professional trumpet player
- Paige Bueckers - WNBA player for the Dallas Wings, 2025 #1 WNBA draft pick
- Corinne Buie - professional ice hockey player for the Minnesota Whitecaps
- Lois McMaster Bujold – fantasy and science fiction author
- Brian Burke – NHL hockey executive
- Austen S. Cargill II – member of the Cargill family
- Curt Carlson – founder of Carlson Companies
- Leeann Chin – founder of Leeann Chin Chinese Cuisine
- Ike Davis – baseball player for the Oakland Athletics
- Lily Delianedis - professional women's ice hockey player for the Seattle Torrent
- John Denver – singer/activist
- Julia Duffy – actress known for Newhart
- Fredrik Eklund – real estate broker known for Million Dollar Listing New York
- Joe Finley – professional ice hockey player for the Buffalo Sabres
- Craig Finn – lead singer / rhythm guitarist for The Hold Steady
- Mardy Fish – professional tennis player
- Ric Flair – professional wrestler
- P. J. Fleck – head coach, Minnesota Golden Gophers Football
- Tim Foecke - metallurgist
- Stan Freese – tuba player and musical director
- Emily Fridlund – author of History of Wolves
- Adam Goldberg – NFL tackle/guard
- Judith Guest – novelist and screenwriter
- John Harris – professional golfer
- Tippi Hedren – actress, lived in Morningside area.
- Doron Jensen – founder of Timber Lodge Steakhouse
- Richard A. Jensen – theologian and academic at Lutheran School of Theology at Chicago
- Ron Johnson – former CEO of J.C. Penney and developer of Apple retail stores and Genius Bar
- Ben Leber – NFL sports radio personality and former linebacker for the Minnesota Vikings
- Anders Lee – NHL center for the New York Islanders
- Nicholas Legeros – bronze sculptor
- Hilary Lunke – professional golfer
- Reggie Lynch (born 1994) - basketball player for Bnei Herzliya of the Israeli Basketball Premier League
- Jamie McBain – NHL defenseman for the Carolina Hurricanes
- Karl Mecklenburg – professional football player with the Denver Broncos
- Bus Mertes – former professional football player and coach for the Minnesota Vikings
- George Mikan – former professional basketball player for the Minneapolis Lakers
- Casey Mittelstadt – NHL center for the Buffalo Sabres
- Riddick Moss - professional wrestler, currently signed to WWE
- Paul C. Nagel - college administrator, professor of history and biographer of the Adams and Lee political families
- George Nagobads – Latvian-born American physician for the United States men's national ice hockey team
- Lou Nanne – former NHL defenseman and general manager
- Win Neuger – former CEO, chairman, and Director at AIG
- Bill Nyrop – former NHL player with the Montreal Canadiens
- Donald Nyrop – former president and CEO of Northwest Airlines
- Greg Olson – former professional baseball player
- Mary Pawlenty – attorney, First District Judge
- Barbara Peterson – Miss Minnesota USA 1976, Miss USA 1976
- Paul Peterson – musician and producer, The Family and The Time
- Zach Parise – professional ice hockey player
- Tom Petters – of Petters Group Worldwide
- Carl Pohlad – former owner, Minnesota Twins
- Jenny Potter – ice hockey player, Olympic gold medalist
- Kirby Puckett – former center fielder for the Minnesota Twins
- Paul Ranheim – former NHL forward
- Kaylin Richardson – World Cup Alpine Skier, Olympian
- Doug Risebrough – former General Manager, Minnesota Wild
- Laura Rizzotto – singer, songwriter
- Sylvester Sanfilippo – pediatrician whose research led to the discovery of Sanfilippo syndrome
- Richard M. Schulze – founder and former chairman of Best Buy
- Joe Senser – former NFL player for the Minnesota Vikings
- Jennifer Steinkamp – artist
- Don Storm – Minnesota state senator
- Christopher Straub – fashion designer and contestant on Project Runway 6
- Michele Tafoya – sportscaster
- Robert Ulrich – former chairman and CEO of Target Corporation
- Paul Westerberg – musician, frontman for The Replacements
- Jeff Wright – safety for the Minnesota Vikings[
- Andrew Zimmern – chef, host of Bizarre Foods and Bizarre World
- Jason Zucker – left wing for the Pittsburgh Penguins

== In popular culture ==
- The interior of a 1950s rambler in Edina's Highlands neighborhood was used in the Coen brothers' 2009 film A Serious Man.
- Lead singer Craig Finn from the band The Hold Steady is from Edina and has made several allusions to the town in their songs. For example, the song "Hornets! Hornets!" from the album Separation Sunday describes a wild night in the town, ending with the line "I drove the wrong way down 169 and almost died up by Edina High". Also, the song's title is a reference to Edina High School's mascot, the Hornet.
- In the movie D2: The Mighty Ducks, star forward Adam Banks, when asked his name and where he is from, introduces himself as "Adam Banks, Edina, Minnesota".
- In the movie Jingle All the Way, some of the exterior house scenes were shot in Edina's Brucewood neighborhood, near Arden Park.
- Part of the 1994 movie Little Big League was shot at one of Countryside Park's baseball diamonds. The umpire wears an Edina Athletic Association T-shirt.
