= Morningside, Minnesota =

Neighborhood in Edina, Minnesota

Coordinates: 44°55′24″N 93°20′03″W

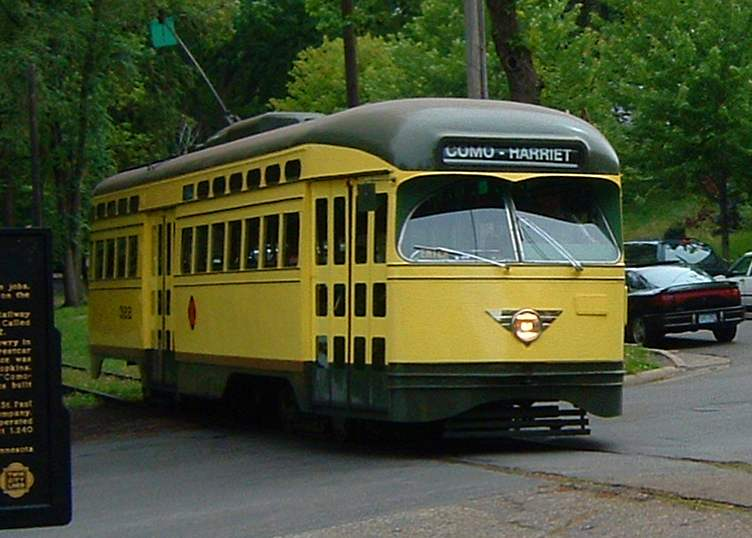
The Como-Harriet Streetcar Line

Morningside is a distinct geographical and architectural neighborhood in Edina, Minnesota, United States. Morningside is an old streetcar suburb adjacent to Minneapolis' Linden Hills neighborhood.

Morningside, which is located along the old Como-Harriet Streetcar Line, grew faster than Edina, which was mostly rural. Morningside residents voted in 1920 to secede from Edina and form their own village in order to provide amenities more suited to a professional streetcar suburb.

Morningside's residential landscape reflects several important broad themes in the pattern of suburban development in the Twin Cities area: the relatively high population density per square mile within the platted subdivisions, the architectural similarity of the houses, and reliance on mass transit. Morningside developers built several hundred new single–family homes, including many bungalows, on standard-sized suburban lots along straight-line streets between about 1905 and 1936, replacing land previously occupied by farm fields and orchards.

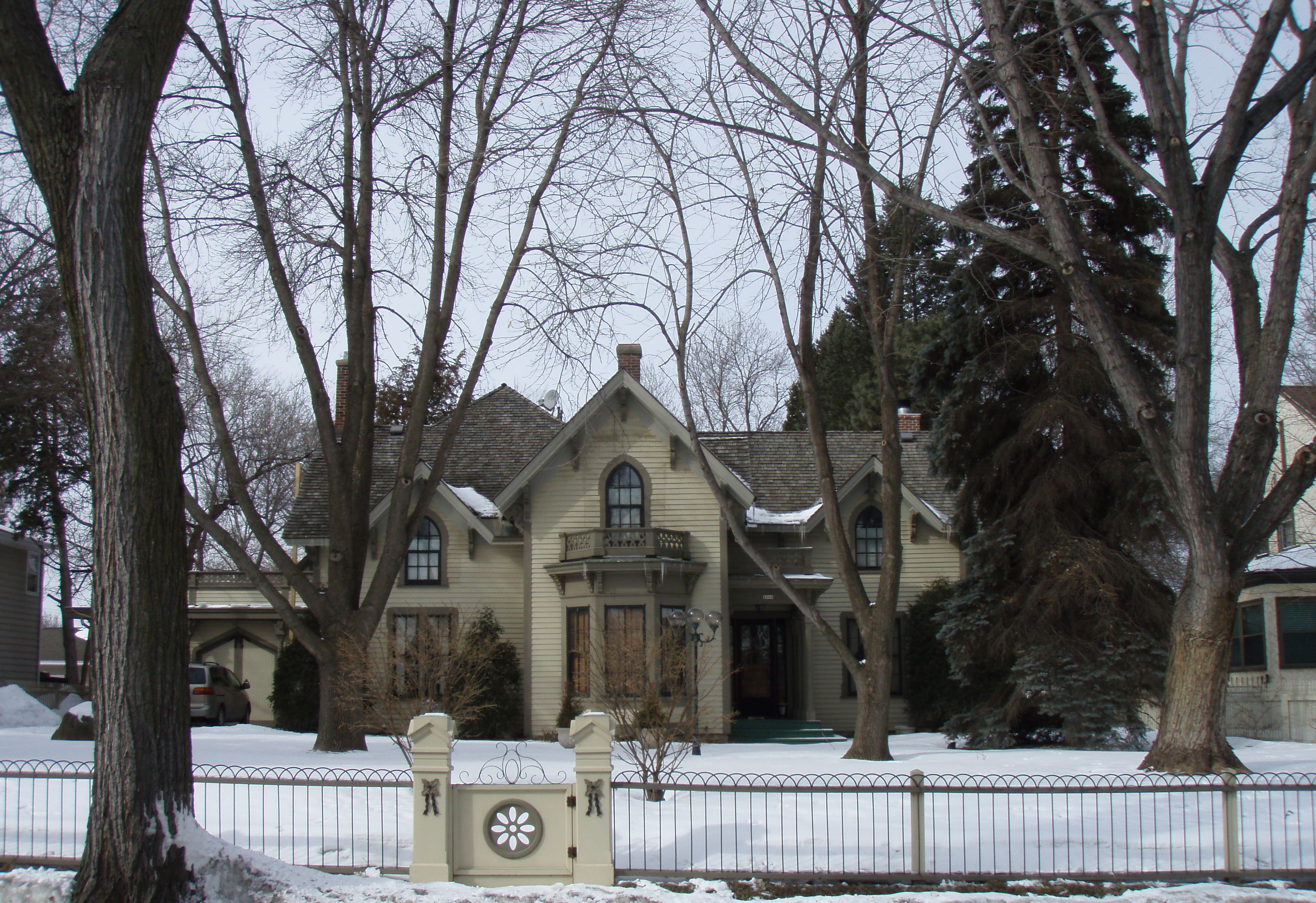
The Jonathan Taylor Grimes House

The children of Jonathan Grimes, who inherited the Grimes farm and apple orchard in the village's northeast corner, platted the Morningside neighborhood for residential development in 1905. Grimes Avenue cuts through the neighborhood in a north–south direction. The Jonathan Taylor Grimes House on West 44th Street was added to the National Register of Historic Places in 1976.

George Weber was a well-known figure in the village early on. In 1929, the mayor of Morningside asked Weber, the school janitor, to be the village marshal. He initially turned down the job, but the council voted him in anyway. Weber remained in charge of Morningside for the next 27 years. With the retirement of Weber in 1956, the Village Police began providing police protection to Morningside. It wasn't until 1960 that the first black family moved into the Morningside neighborhood, where they were met with an anti-immigrant campaign. The family was supported by a fairness petition signed by 251 Morningside residents, representing a majority of the community.

Morningside's police station was located at 4400 Branson Street and was run by Weber's wife. His responsibilities also included water meter reading and census taking. On the first and third Monday evenings of each month, court was held in the Edina Grange Hall. Weber is commemorated by a park in the Morningside neighborhood.

Morningside remained a separate village for 46 years, until 1966, when it was reincorporated into the larger City of Edina in response to state pressure. Citizens of Morningside voted to rejoin Edina, owing in part to the impracticality of building a sewage infrastructure for such a small municipality. Morningside's previous autonomy is still visible in the 55416 Zip Code that it shares with neighboring Minneapolis and St. Louis Park, as well as in the water system, which is linked to the City of Minneapolis water department..

Morningside retains a distinct personality from the rest of Edina, and its name is still found in community organizations, roads, and businesses. The Morningside Babysitting Cooperative has been around for nearly a century and still keeps track of its members' shared hours of child care. The Morningside Woman's Club, formerly known as the Morningside Literary Club, was founded in 1937. Morningside has an active Neighborhood Association that provides a voice at City Hall to represent the neighborhood. A Morningside men's group, the Morningside Athletic Club (MAC), meets every Saturday morning at Weber Park for sports activity, such as soccer, football and ice boot hockey.

Historical population
Census	Pop.	Note	%±
1930	903		—
1940	1,282		42.0%
1950	1,699		32.5%
1960	1,981		16.6%
U.S. Decennial Census

== Politics ==
Presidential election results

Precinct General Election Results
Year	Republican	Democratic	Third parties
1964	62.6% 701	37.3% 417	0.1% 1
1960	71.6% 810	28.4% 321	0.0% 0
1956	82.7% 809	17.3% 169	0.0% 0
