= Leeann Chin (restaurateur) =

American restaurateur

- 陳李惠卿
- Born: February 13, 1933; Guangzhou, China
- Died: March 10, 2010 (aged 77); Seattle, Washington, U.S.
- Resting place: Lakewood Cemetery
- Known for: Leeann Chin restaurant chain

Lei Waihing
- Traditional Chinese: 李惠卿
- Simplified Chinese: 李惠卿
Transcriptions
Standard Mandarin
- Hanyu Pinyin: Lǐ Huìqīng
Yue: Cantonese
- Jyutping: Lei5 Wai6 Hing1

Canlei Waihing
- Traditional Chinese: 陳李惠卿
- Simplified Chinese: 陈李惠卿
Transcriptions
Standard Mandarin
- Hanyu Pinyin: Chén Lǐ Huìqīng
Yue: Cantonese
- Jyutping: Can4 Lei5 Wai6 Hing1

Leeann Chin (February 13, 1933 – March 10, 2010) was a Chinese-born American restaurateur, entrepreneur and businesswoman who founded the Leeann Chin restaurant chain in the Twin Cities Metropolitan Area, which features her name, in 1980.

Chin was born in Guangzhou, China, on February 13, 1933. The daughter of a grocery store owner, she worked at her father's store as a cashier, cleaner, stocking clerk and bicycle delivery person. Chin married her husband, Tony, as a teenager and moved to Hong Kong for a few years. In 1956, she immigrated to the United States with her husband and settled in Minnesota. Chin worked first as a seamstress at several Minneapolis clothing stores after taking classes to learn how to mend clothes and create wedding dresses.

Chin began selling clothes out of her home in South Minneapolis while she and her husband raised their five children. Her interest in food and restaurants began while she was still running her clothing business from her home. Chin cooked free meals and hosted dinner parties for her customers as a way of thanking them for their business. Soon, customers requested that Chin host cooking classes and cater events, according to her daughter, Laura Chin.

Chin opened her eponymous first restaurant, Leeann Chin, at the Bonaventure Mall in Minnetonka, Minnesota in 1980. The restaurant, which was one of the first to offer Cantonese and Sichuan cuisine in the Twin Cities area, initially offered more than 100 menu items, most of which were created and developed by Chin. The first Minnetonka location featured a sit-down dining room and menus embellished with calligraphy. The restaurant proved an immediate success, with some food, which took days to make, selling out quickly. Chin soon converted it into an 80-seat buffet-style eatery to keep up with customer demand.

Chin opened her second location in the Saint Paul Union Depot in downtown Saint Paul, Minnesota in 1984, while a third Leeann Chin restaurant opened at the International Design Center in Minneapolis that same year. Another location, which also opened in 1984 in downtown Minneapolis served more than 1,000 customers on an average business day.

In 1985, Chin, who had run the day-to-day operations, sold the rights to her name and her restaurants to General Mills. Chin regained the ownership of her business in 1988. By the time Chin left the business in the late 1990s, the Leeann Chin chain had become a Chinese fast food operation. Smaller take-out locations were set up inside Byerly's grocery stores. Chin retired in 1999. As of 2010, the Leeann Chin chain had grown to more than 40 locations, mostly in the Minneapolis – Saint Paul area.

Chin continued to teach cooking during her life. She hosted a cooking show on PBS and authored three cookbooks on Chinese cuisine. Chin moved to the state of Washington and resided on Bainbridge Island.

Leeann Chin died from complications of liver cancer on March 10, 2010, in Seattle, Washington, aged 77. She was buried in Lakewood Cemetery. Her husband, Tony, died in 1994.
