= Leeann Chin =

American restaurant chain

Leeann Chin, Inc.
- Industry: Restaurants
- Founded: 1980; 46 years ago in Minnetonka, Minnesota
- Founder: Leeann Chin
- Headquarters: Bloomington, Minnesota
- Number of locations: 39
- Area served: Minnesota, North Dakota, Wisconsin
- Key people: Mike Loney, COO John Tvedt (VP)
- Owner: Lorne Goldberg
- Number of employees: 1,000
- Website: leeannchin.com

Leeann Chin is an American Asian quick service restaurant chain, with 39 locations throughout the Midwest, mostly in the Minneapolis-Saint Paul area. The chain was founded by its namesake, Leeann Chin, and funded by Carl Pohlad (banker and former owner of the Minnesota Twins) and actor Sean Connery. The concept received Best Chinese Food and Best Takeout Food as well as being voted No. 80 in a list of the country's top 100 by fast casual restaurant industry website FastCasual.com in 2011. It is currently owned by Los Angeles-based financier and former investment banker Lorne Goldberg, who also owns the popular Asian chains Pick Up Stix and Mandarin Express.

The chain offers chicken entrees, in addition to beef and shrimp options, prepared in Mongolian, Hunan, and Sichuan styles from mild to spicy.

== History ==
The concept was founded by Leeann Chin, a Chinese immigrant who moved to Minnesota in 1957. She opened her first location in Minnetonka, Minnesota in 1980 and another in St. Paul in 1984. General Mills bought the name to her restaurants and the restaurants in 1984 with plans to expand the chain nationally. However, locations opened in Chicago faltered and General Mills put an end to opening new restaurants. The restaurants and name were bought back from General Mills by Leeann Chin Inc. in 1988, with the help of Capital Dimensions Venture Fund.

Lorne Goldberg bought the chain in 2007, through his Los Angeles-based Mandarin Holdings. Shortly thereafter, Goldberg invested about $8 million in the chain to revitalize the decor of the restaurants and improve its menu, introducing new items that were initially developed for Mandarin Express’ restaurants. The new items and location remodels quickly accounted for an increase of about 20 percent of sales. Goldberg also moved away from operating takeout counters within Lunds & Byerlys grocery stores.

In 2011, Leeann Chin Inc. began to expand outside of its base in Minnesota's Twin Cities with opening of its Fargo, North Dakota restaurant. As of 2024, Leeann Chin has locations in Minnesota, Wisconsin, North Dakota, South Dakota, Iowa, and locations in Maryland at Baltimore-Washington International Airport and Atlanta at Hartsfield-Jackson Atlanta International Airport.

In 2013, the chain launched its AsiaFit menu, a selection of low calorie stir-fry dishes, following a trend among casual-dining restaurants for lighter, healthier meals.

Goldberg told the press that he is interested in being an owner and building the Leeann Chin brand over many years to come.
