= Country Club Historic District (Edina, Minnesota) =

Historic district in Minnesota, United States

- U.S. National Register of Historic Places
- U.S. Historic district
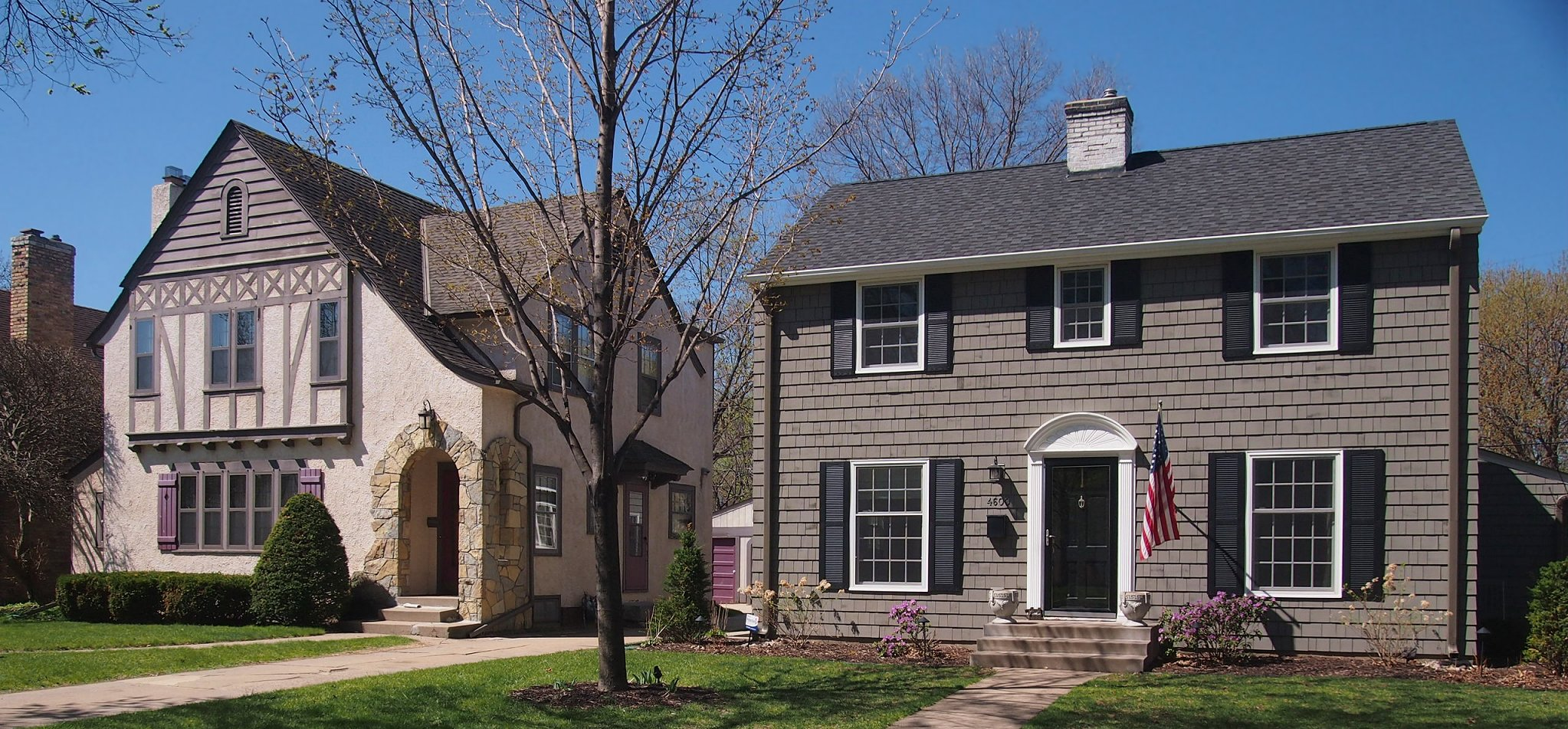
- 4602 & 4600 Casco Avenue within the Country Club Historic District

- Location within Minnesota Location within the United States
- Location: Edina, Minnesota
- Coordinates: 44°55′0″N 93°20′24″W
- Area: 300 acres (120 ha)
- Built: 1924–1931
- Architect: Samuel J. Thorpe
- Architectural style: Colonial Revival, Mission/Spanish Revival
- NRHP reference No.: 82002958
- Added to NRHP: April 26, 1982

The Country Club Historic District is a suburban residential district established in 1922 in Edina, Minnesota, United States. It was one of Minnesota's first comprehensive planned communities and served as the prototype for subsequent town planning in this suburb of Minneapolis. The development was modeled after the J.C. Nichols Country Club District in Kansas City, Missouri.

The district is also noted for its homogeneous Period Revival architecture. The architectural styles are primarily Colonial Revival, Tudor Revival, Georgian Revival and Mediterranean Revival designs. The neighborhood is listed in the National Register of Historic Places with 550 contributing properties mostly built 1924–1931. It was listing for having local significance in architecture, community planning, and landscape architecture.

It once had restrictive covenants preventing "any person other than one of the white or Caucasian race" from purchasing a home.

== See also ==
- National Register of Historic Places listings in Hennepin County, Minnesota
