= Edina High School =

Public high school in Minnesota, United States

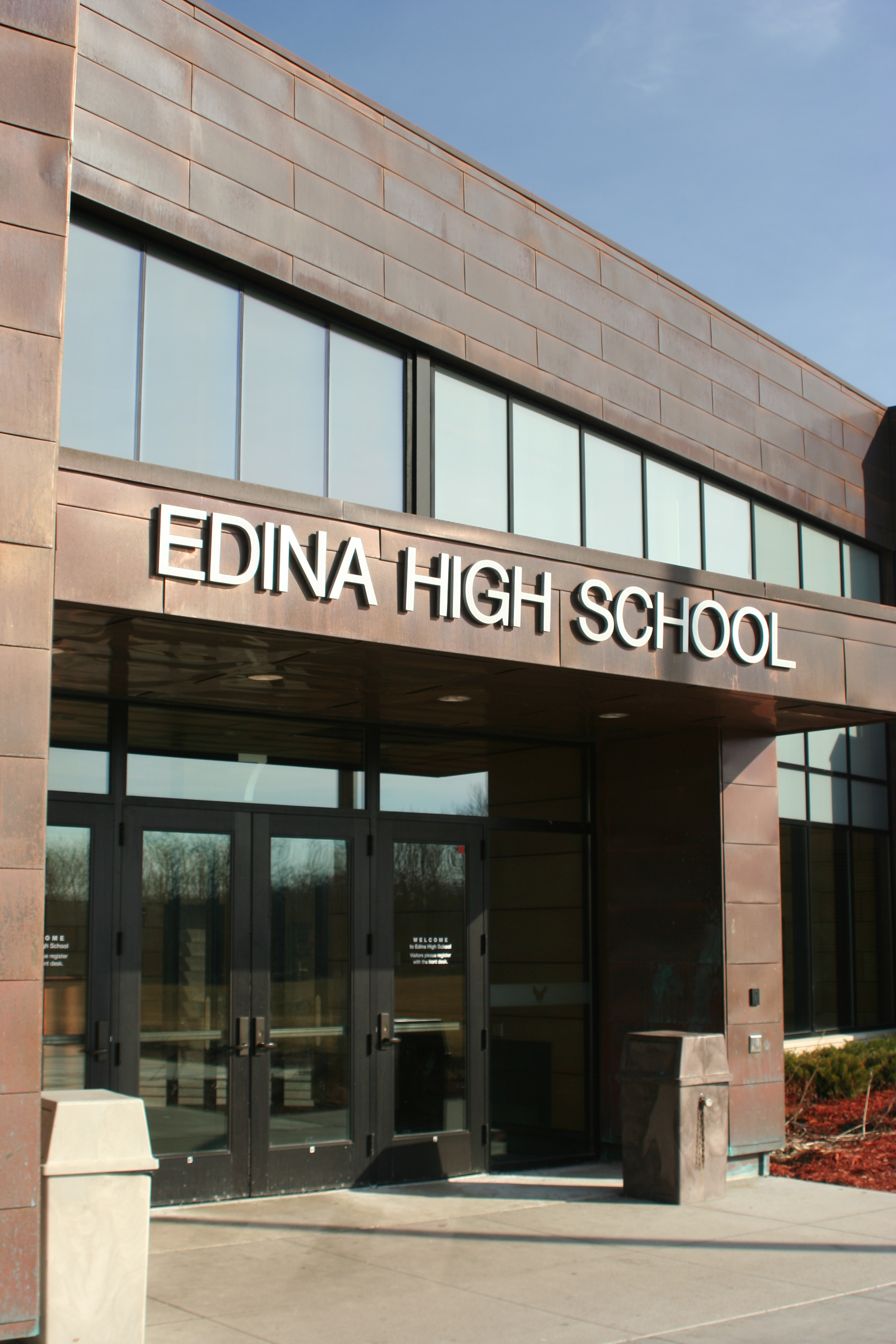

Location
- 6754 Valley View Road; Edina, Minnesota; United States; 44°52′59″N 93°22′36″W

Information
- Type: Public
- Established: 1949
- Principal: Paul Paetzel
- Staff: 133.55 (FTE)
- Grades: 9–12
- Enrollment: 2,641 (2024–2025)
- Student to teacher ratio: 19.78
- Campus: Suburban
- Colors: Kelly Green and White
- Athletics: Lake Conference
- Mascot: Hornet
- Team name: Edina Hornets
- USNWR ranking: 235
- Newspaper: Zephyrus
- Yearbook: Whigrean
- Website: https://ehs.edinaschools.org/

Edina High School is a four-year public high school located in Edina, Minnesota, United States, a suburb of Minneapolis.

A second high school, Edina West High School, opened in fall 1972 next to Valley View Junior High School. Edina High School was renamed Edina East High School. Due to declining student enrollment, the two schools combined eight years later. Edina East closed in spring 1981, and the building eventually became the Edina Community Center, the district administrative offices, the welcome center, and Normandale Elementary School. Edina West became Edina High School.

== History ==
Before a high school opened in Edina, students looking to extend their education past eighth grade had to find their way down to the old Central High School at 4th Avenue and South 11th Street in Minneapolis. By the 1940s some Edina students in grades 10 through 12 attended private high schools. Of those who could not afford to attend a private high school, some were enrolled at St. Louis Park High School while many others were being "farmed out" to West and Southwest High Schools in Minneapolis. In 1941, Minneapolis schools raised their tuition for out-of-city students, and despite the increase, Edina residents voted to pay the increased tuition rather than build their own high school.

During the mid-1940s, support for an Edina-Morningside junior and senior high school was increasing. However, World War II and the resulting shortage of building materials delayed construction of the Edina-Morningside Junior and Edina-Morningside Senior High School. But after the war, support for the new school began to resurface. Two sites for the new school had the most support. One was on the property that is currently occupied by the Edina Country Club near 50th Street and Wooddale Avenue and the other was at West 56th Street and Normandale Road. Although the 50th and Wooddale site was the center of the village's population at the time, the 56th and Normandale site was nearer to the school district's geographic center and was the eventual site chosen to build the new school.

The first high school to open in Edina, later known as Edina East, is now the site of the Edina Community Center and Normandale Elementary School. It was built as a combination high school/junior high. A $1.25 million school bond issue was passed in 1946 by the residents of Edina and ground was broken in October 1947. A year later the school was dedicated. It was not until the fall of 1949 that classes began and it was at that time that the student body chose the school colors (green and white) and the school mascot, the Hornet. The school had 28 classrooms, 11 special rooms and laboratories, a library and a special radio room. In 1952, one year after the first class graduated, a gymnasium and auditorium were added to the building.

In the 1960s, the high school was becoming overcrowded. As a result, on October 20, 1970, a $9.255 million bond issue was approved by voters to construct a new high school attached to Valley View Junior High School. Construction of the new high school began on May 24, 1971, and the school was opened in the fall of 1972. The Edina East High School retained the "Hornets" and Edina West High School became the "Cougars".

In 1981 Edina East was closed and Edina West was renamed Edina High School. The newly unified school decided on the "Hornets" nickname. Part of the old high school building was converted to the Edina kindergarten center in 1987 and the Edina Senior Center. As of 2015, the building is used as a community center, housing the Normandale French Immersion K-5 elementary school, the school district's main offices and the school district's Welcome Center.

In November 2003, city of Edina residents passed an $85.8 million bond referendum to renovate all school facilities in the district, with the high school undergoing major renovations. Construction began on the high school in May 2004 and was completed in 2007.

Edina High School completed its $60 million renovations in September 2017. As a result, Edina High School now contains space to host grades 9-12 instead of grades 10–12.

== Demographics ==
As of 2026, Edina High School has a student population of 2,641 that is 0.1% Native American, 6.6% multiracial, 7.5% Hispanic, 8.2% Asian, 11.9% black, and 65.8% white. The school's graduation rate is 95%. According to a survey done by Edina Schools, 95% of seniors go on to college and 86% finish in five years. 10 years after graduation, 30% of Edina graduates stated that they had completed graduate school degrees or were pursuing graduate degrees.

== Extracurriculars ==
Edina High School offers various extracurriculars for students.

The school's publications include the yearbook, a student newspaper, and a literary arts magazine. The yearbook is titled Whigrean, meaning white and green annual. The school newspaper is the Zephyrus, and is a member of the High School National Ad Network. The school has a student-published literary arts magazine entitled Images [on the wind].

In 2011, Edina was the first high school in Minnesota to perform on the Main Stage of the International Thespian Festival in over forty years, where they performed Anything Goes. In 2013, they brought "Fiddler on the Roof" to the Main Stage at the International Thespian Festival. In 2016, they were one of the first high schools in the nation to perform a Disney-sponsored show called "Peter and the Starcatcher", which they once again brought to the Main Stage. In 2018, they brought "The Visit" to the Main Stage at the International Thespian Festival.

Edina has a nationally recognized FIRST Robotics Competition team: Team 1816, or "The Green Machine". The team won the FIRST Championship The FIRST Impact Award (formerly the Chairman's Award), the highest honor a robotics team can receive, earning them a spot in the Hall of Fame at the 2019 FIRST Championship

Edina High School has had an Ultimate Frisbee program that has competed since 2003, both locally in the Minnesota Ultimate High School League,and nationally through USA Ultimate-sanctioned tournaments. The Boys & Girls teams have combined to win a state record 13 State Championships. Girls Varsity won in 2014, 2019, 2021, and 2022, while Boys Varsity won in 2014, 2016, 2017, 2019, 2021, 2022, 2023, 2024, and 2025.

Edina High School also participates in Quiz Bowl. In the 2024-2025 season, Edina's A Team for Quiz Bowl won the Minnesota High School Quiz Bowl League and the state championship. This was one of three times this feat was accomplished for the team.

Finally, Edina has a nationally recognized debate team, which has been nationally ranked in the recent past (16th in 2009-10 and 19th in 2010–11)

== Athletics ==
Edina High School is a member of the Lake Conference of the Minnesota State High School League. Previously a member of the Lake Conference and the Classic Lake Conference, the school joined the new Lake Conference in 2010. Edina claims 210 athletic high school state championships, a state record, with most of them earned in tennis, swimming & diving, and boys hockey. In 2000, the school was recognized as the first school in the state of Minnesota to win more than 100 state championships. In 2019, the record was broken for most state championships won in a school year as Edina claimed 8 titles. The boys' hockey team has won a state-record fourteen championships (including three titles by Edina East), eight under Willard Ikola alone. Edina held the record for most consecutive state championships in girls tennis with fifteen from 1978 to 1992. In 2012, Edina broke their own record by winning nineteen straight state championships from 1997 to 2015. In June 2023, Edina was the first school in Minnesota to achieve 200 state championships.

In 2005, Sports Illustrated ranked Edina as the 8th best sports program in the United States.

Key: E = Edina East, W = Edina West, * = Not included in MSHSL count

Team State Championships
Athletic
| Season | Sport | Number of State Championships | Year |
|---|---|---|---|
| Fall | Cross Country, Girls | 4 | 2015, 2016, 2019, 2021 |
| Fall | Cross Country, Boys | 2 | 2018, 2024 |
| Fall | Football | 7^{[1]} | 1957*, 1965*, 1966*, 1969*, 1971*, 1978W, 2025 |
| Fall | Gymnastics, Boys | 3 | 1982, 1984, 1990* |
| Fall | Tennis, Girls | 37^{[2]} | 1978E, 1979E, 1980E, 1981, 1982, 1983, 1984, 1985, 1986, 1987, 1988, 1989, 1990, 1991, 1992, 1997, 1998, 1999, 2000, 2001, 2002, 2003, 2004, 2005, 2006, 2007, 2008, 2009, 2010, 2011, 2012, 2013, 2014, 2015, 2017, 2018, 2019 |
| Fall | Swimming & Diving, Girls | 20 | 1984, 1986, 1987, 1988, 1992, 1999^{[3]}, 2000, 2001, 2003, 2004, 2010, 2011, 2012, 2016, 2017, 2018, 2019, 2022, 2023, 2025 |
| Fall | Soccer, Boys | 5 | 1999, 2000, 2001, 2019, 2025 |
| Fall | Soccer, Girls | 2 | 1987, 2023 |
| Fall | Soccer, Adaptive (CI) | 2 | 1991*, 2000 |
| Winter | Basketball, Boys | 3 | 1966, 1967, 1968 |
| Winter | Basketball, Girls | 1 | 1988 |
| Winter | Hockey, Boys | 14^{[2]} | 1969, 1971, 1974E, 1978E, 1979E, 1982, 1984, 1988, 1997, 2010, 2013, 2014, 2019, 2024 |
| Winter | Hockey, Girls | 5 | 2017, 2018, 2019, 2021, 2024 |
| Winter | Hockey, Adaptive Floor (CI) | 2 | 1994, 1995 |
| Winter | Gymnastics, Girls | 4 | 1979W, 1980E, 1981W, 1985 |
| Winter | Swimming & Diving, Boys | 16 | 1965, 1967, 1968, 1984, 1986, 1987, 2004, 2008, 2009, 2010, 2019, 2020, 2021, 2022, 2024, 2025 |
| Winter | Competition Cheerleading | 8 | 2007*, 2009*, 2010*, 2011*, 2016*, 2018*, 2021*, 2023* |
| Winter | Skiing, Nordic Boys | 2 | 1981W, 1988 |
| Winter | Skiing, Alpine Boys | 9 | 1967, 1979W, 1980W, 1982, 1999, 2002, 2015, 2016, 2019 |
| Winter | Skiing, Alpine Girls | 10 | 1991, 1997, 1998, 1999, 2001, 2002, 2004, 2005, 2009, 2021 |
| Spring | Baseball | 2 | 1968, 1983 |
| Spring | Golf, Boys | 10 | 1954, 1970, 1973W, 1977W, 1978W, 1987, 2014, 2019, 2022, 2023 |
| Spring | Tennis, Boys | 25^{[2]} | 1959, 1966, 1967, 1968, 1971, 1972, 1973E, 1975E, 1978E, 1979E, 1980W, 1981E, 1987, 1988, 1989, 1992, 1995, 1998, 2000, 2002, 2003, 2006, 2008, 2009, 2021 |
| Spring | Track and field, Boys | 3 | 1969, 1970, 1974E |
| Spring | Badminton | 3 | 2023*, 2024*, 2025* |
| Spring | Lacrosse, Boys | 1 | 2025 |
| Spring | Golf, Girls | 12 | 1983, 1984, 1988, 1993, 1994, 1995, 1997, 2013, 2015, 2016, 2017, 2018 |
| Total Team Athletic | | 210 | |
Team Non-Athletic
| Spring | Robotics | 1 | 2022 |
| Total Team Non-Athletic | | 213 | |
Other State Championships (Club and Individual)
| Winter | Policy Debate | 7 | 1971, 1979W, 2002, 2005, 2012, 2017, 2023 |
| Winter | Lincoln-Douglas Debate | 6 | 2002, 2003, 2015, 2016, 2023, 2025 |
| Winter | FIRST Robotics | 5 | 2006*, 2007*, 2008*, 2009*, 2010* |
| Winter | Minnesota State High School Mathematics League | 2 | 2014, 2015 |
| Total Other (Club and Individual) | | 20^{[1]} | |
| Total | | 233^{[1]} | |

1. Prior to the inception of the Minnesota State High School League football tournament, the Edina Hornets were ranked #1 in the state for the following years: 1952, 1953, 1955, 1957, 1960, 1965, 1966, 1969, 1971
2. Denotes state record
3. The 1999 state championship was a tie between Eden Prairie High School and Edina High School; this was the first tie at a state championship in Minnesota

== Notable alumni ==
=== Business ===
- Roy J. Bostock (class of 1958), business executive
- Robert Bruss (class of 1958), lawyer, real estate broker, author, and newspaper columnist
- Dave MacLennan (class of 1977 East) former CEO of Cargill
- Brian J. Dunn (class of c. 1978 West), former CEO of Best Buy
- Ron Johnson (class of 1977), former CEO of J.C. Penney, former Senior Vice President of Retail Operations at Apple Inc.

=== Politics ===
- Ron Johnson (class of 1973) (attended), current Republican Senator of Wisconsin
- Mary Anderson Pawlenty (class of 1979), Minnesota District Court Judge and wife of former Minnesota Governor Tim Pawlenty
- Erin Matson (class of 1998), action vice president of the National Organization for Women

=== Sports ===
- Jeff Wright (class of 1967), former safety with the Minnesota Vikings
- Bill Nyrop (class of 1970), hockey player who played for the Montreal Canadiens and was a member of three Stanley Cup winning teams (1976, 1977, and 1978)
- Paul Siebert (class of 1971), Major League Baseball pitcher for Houston Astros, San Diego Padres, and New York Mets
- Brian Burke (class of 1973 West), Hockey Hall of Famer, general manager and executive VP, Toronto Maple Leafs and 2010 United States Men's Olympic Ice Hockey Silver Medalist Team
- Gord Hampson (class of 1977 East), retired National Hockey League player
- Karl Mecklenburg (class of 1978 West), NFL Pro-Bowl linebacker with the Denver Broncos
- Greg Olson (class of 1979 East), former catcher for the Atlanta Braves
- Chris Perry (class of 1980 West), golfer with one PGA Tour victory
- Paul Ranheim (class of 1984), hockey player who played for Calgary, Hartford, Carolina, Philadelphia, and Phoenix from 1988 to 2003
- Jenny Schmidgall-Potter (class of 1997), ice hockey player and gold medalist at the 1998 Nagano Games
- Hilary Lunke (class of 1997), golfer, winner of the 2003 U.S. Women's Open
- Adam Goldberg (class of 1998), former NFL player
- David Ostlund (class of 1999), semi-professional World's Strongest Man competitor
- Joe Finley (class of 2006), NHL first round draft pick (27th overall) of the Washington Capitals, former North Dakota Fighting Sioux defensemen
- Kaylin Richardson (class of 2003), 2006 and 2010 Olympic skier
- Mike Rallis (class of 2007), wrestler formerly signed to WWE under the ring name Madcap Moss
- Anders Lee (class of 2009), hockey player; team captain of the New York Islanders beginning in 2018
- Nick Rallis (class of 2012), defensive coordinator for the Arizona Cardinals
- Reggie Lynch (class of 2013), basketball player for Bnei Herzliya of the Israeli Basketball Premier League
- Jordan Thompson (class of 2015), volleyball player, member of the United States national team that won the gold medal at the 2020 Summer Olympics
- Kieffer Bellows (class of 2016), hockey player who is a free agent and played for the New York Islanders and for Boston University from 2016 to 2017
- Tommy Doyle (class of 2016), football player for the NFL's Buffalo Bills
- Maddie Dahlien (class of 2022), soccer player
- Izzy Engle (class of 2024), soccer player
- Mason West (class of 2026), hockey player drafted by the NHL's Chicago Blackhawks

=== Entertainment ===
- Stan Freese (class of 1962), tuba player, band director, and talent booking and casting director with The Walt Disney Company
- Julia Duffy (class of 1969), actress
- Barbara Peterson Burwell (class of 1972), Miss USA 1976
- David Bloom (class of 1981 West), news reporter, NBC
- Christopher Straub (class of 1997), contestant on the television show Project Runway; finished fifth in the sixth season
- Paris Bennett (class of 2004) (through 11th grade), contestant on the television show American Idol; finished fifth in the fifth season
- Jenny Taft (class of 2006), sportscaster
- Breckie Hill (class of 2021), influencer and OnlyFans creator
- Andrew “Chef Donny” Enriquez (Class of 2015), host of What’s For Lunch? produced by Barstool Sports. “Chef Donny” is also the author of Not Your Mother’s Cookbook.
