= Lunds & Byerlys =

American supermarket chain

Lund Food Holdings

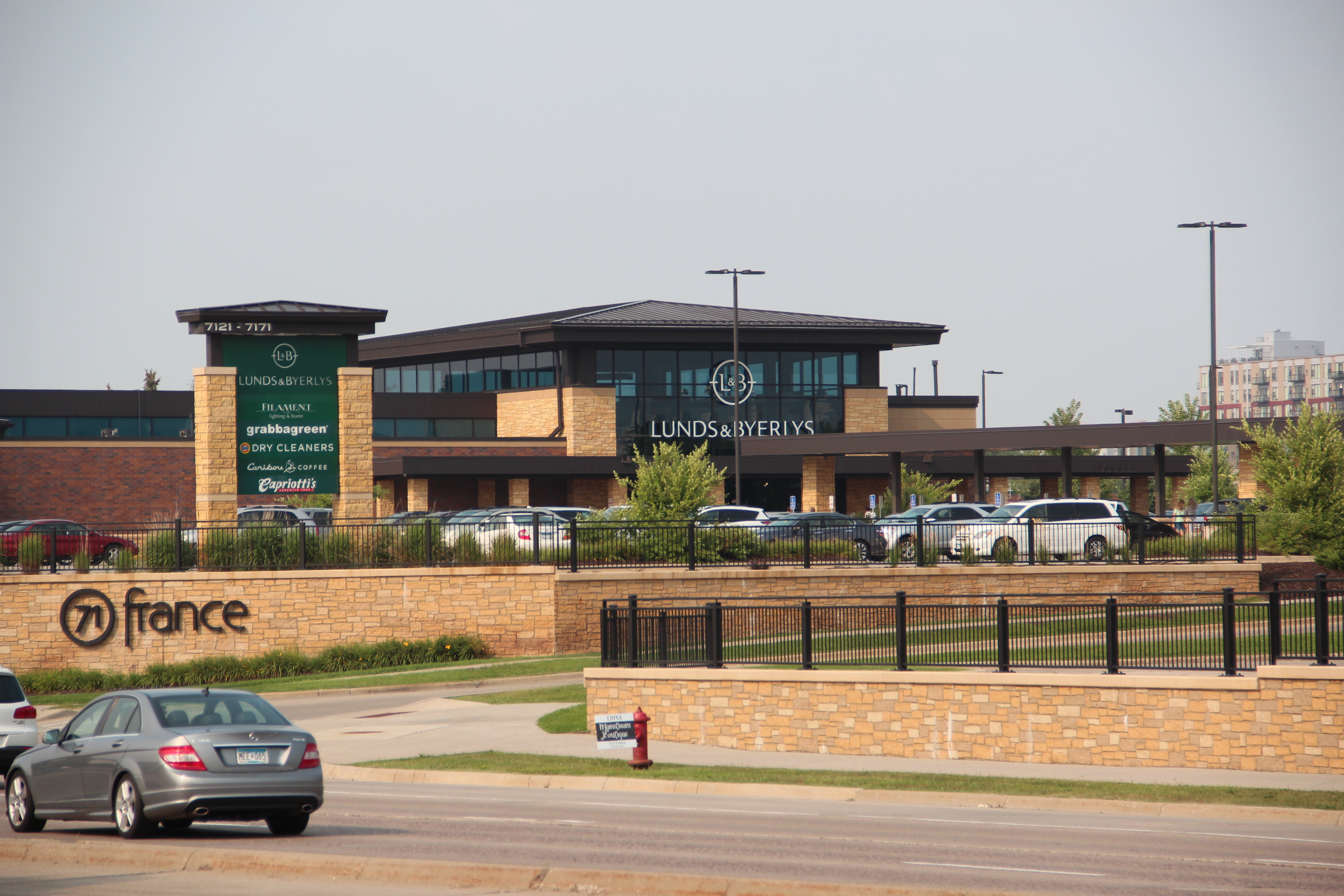
- A Lunds & Byerlys in Edina
- Trade name: Lunds & Byerlys
- Type: Private
- Industry: Retail
- Predecessors: Hove's (1939–1964); Lunds (1964-2015); Byerly's (1968–2015)
- Founded: 1939 (87 years ago) in Uptown, Minneapolis, Minnesota
- Headquarters: Edina, Minnesota, U.S.
- Number of locations: 28 (2026)
- Key people: Russell T. Lund III (President and CEO)
- Products: Supermarkets
- Revenue: ▲US$500 million (2019)
- Number of employees: 3,900
- Subsidiaries: Lunds & Byerlys
- Website: lundsandbyerlys.com

Lund Food Holdings, Inc is an American supermarket operator. Headquartered in Edina, it owns the upscale supermarket chain Lunds & Byerlys (L&B). The company opened its first supermarkets in the Uptown area of Minneapolis. In 2015, it changed its name from Lunds to Lunds & Byerlys. It operates 28 stores in Minneapolis-St. Paul metro area of Minnesota,with its most recent store in Apple valley in 2023.

== History ==
Lunds and Byerly's were competing companies until 1997, when Lunds acquired Byerly's. They continued to operate under their individual names until April 2015, when the stores were rebranded Lunds & Byerlys. In 2006, the company launched its online grocery shopping service. Shoppers have the option of either picking up their groceries at certain stores or having it delivered to their home.

=== Lunds History ===
Russell T. Lund Sr. worked at a grocery called Hove's in 1939 at the corner of Lake Street and Hennepin Avenue in the Uptown neighborhood of Minneapolis. Russell Lund Sr., an employee, took an equity stake in the cheese and cracker department in 1922 and after founding a popcorn business (Red-e-Popped), a larger stake in 1939. The chain took the Lunds name in 1964.

=== Byerly's History ===
Byerly's
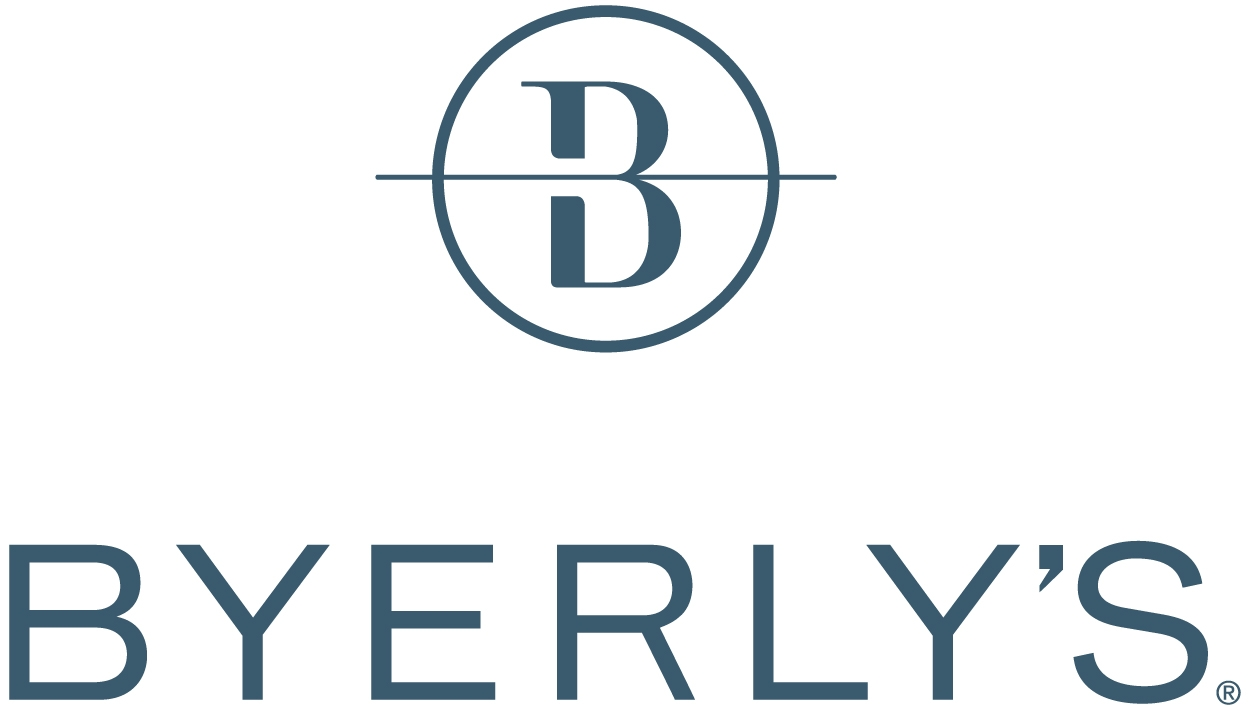

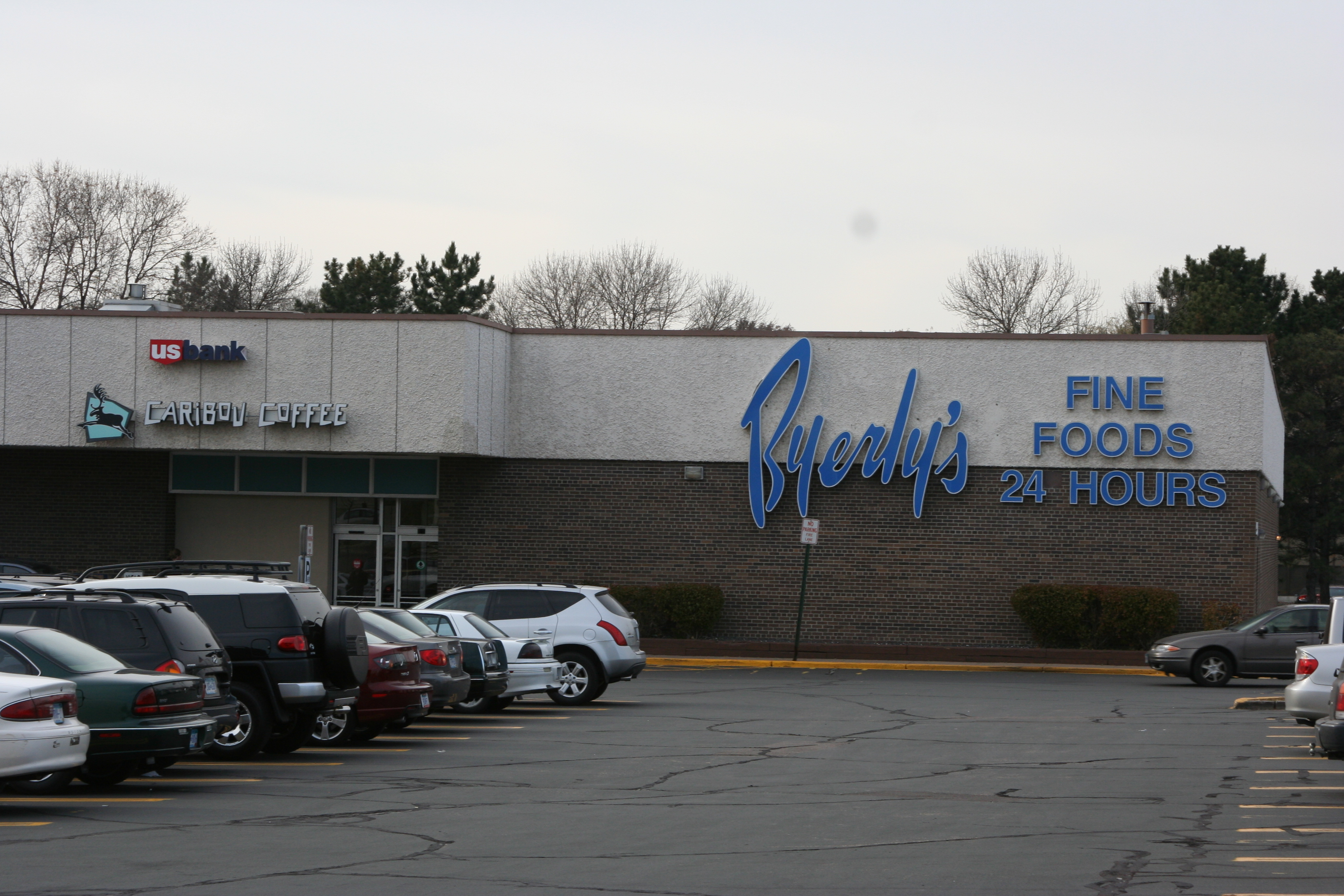
- Byerly's Golden Valley, MN Location
- Type: Private (1968-1997); Subsidiary (1997-2015)
- Industry: Retail, Grocery
- Founded: 1968; 58 years ago
- Defunct: 2015
- Fate: Acquired by Lund Food Holdings and converted into the Lunds and Byerlys brand name
- Headquarters: Edina, Minnesota
- Number of locations: 15
- Key people: Don Byerly (founder)
- Products: Bakery, dairy, deli, frozen foods, grocery, meat, pharmacy, produce, seafood, snacks
- Parent: Lund Food Holdings
- Website: Archived official website at the Wayback Machine (archived April 16, 2015)

Byerly's was founded in 1968 by Don Byerly, who opened the first store in Golden Valley, Minnesota. Byerly's opened fourteen other stores in the metro area.

Byerly's stores, which ranged in size from 50,000 to 90,000 square feet (8,400 m^{2}), were open 24 hours a day until, February 2008 when the store hours were changed to 6am to 12am. Byerly's locations offered in-store United States Post Offices, full-service banks, coffee shops, floral departments, wines & spirits shops, and in-store Byerly's restaurants. All Byerly's branded restaurants have now closed.

The store was known for its "great customer service" and its deli and bakery. Byerly's was commonly viewed as high-end grocery shopping, and prices were relatively similar to other retail stores selling the same brands. Product quality was the core focus of Byerlys and the prices reflect higher quality products.

In April 1997, Byerly's was purchased by Lund Food Holdings, Inc., parent company of Edina-based Lunds.
