= Education in Saint Paul, Minnesota =

Saint Paul, Minnesota contains many educational institutions from grade school to high school, college and beyond. A number of educational "firsts" have happened in Saint Paul. Hamline University, the first and oldest college in Minnesota, was founded in Saint Paul in 1854. In 1991, Minnesota became the first state in the United States to pass legislation allowing the existence of charter schools. The following year, the first charter school in the nation, City Academy High School, was established in Saint Paul. The oldest library in Minnesota, the Minnesota State Law Library, was opened in 1849.

== Primary and secondary education ==
=== Public schools ===
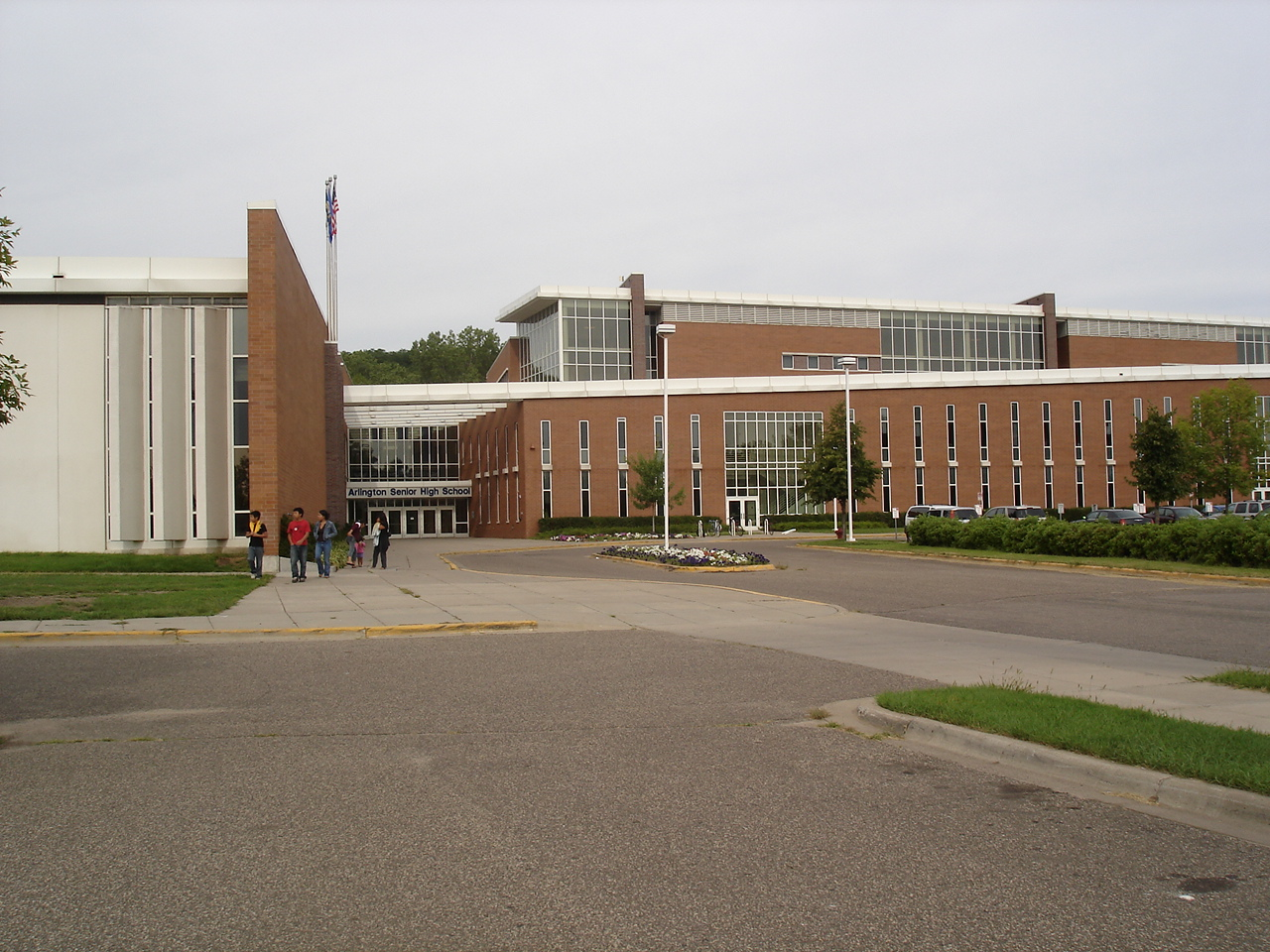
Washington Technology Magnet of the Saint Paul Public Schools District.

Saint Paul Public Schools is the school district that serves the entire city. It is the state's second largest school district with approximately 38,000 students. The district is also one of the most diverse in Minnesota.

There are also many charter schools that are run separately from the Saint Paul Public Schools, but are administered by the Minnesota Department of Education. 21 charter schools currently operate in Saint Paul.

=== Private schools ===
Saint Paul has numerous private schools, including non-sectarian, Jewish, Roman Catholic, and Protestant. The Minnesota Department of Education has no authority over private school operations; private schools may or may not be accredited, and achievement tests are not required for private school graduating seniors. Many private schools will obtain accreditation and perform achievement tests as a means of demonstrating that the school is genuinely interested in educational performance. Saint Paul is currently home to 38 private schools.

In addition, Catholic schools in Saint Paul are operated by the Archdiocese of Saint Paul and Minneapolis. Three high schools and fourteen elementary schools are overseen by the archdiocese.

== List of elementary and secondary schools ==
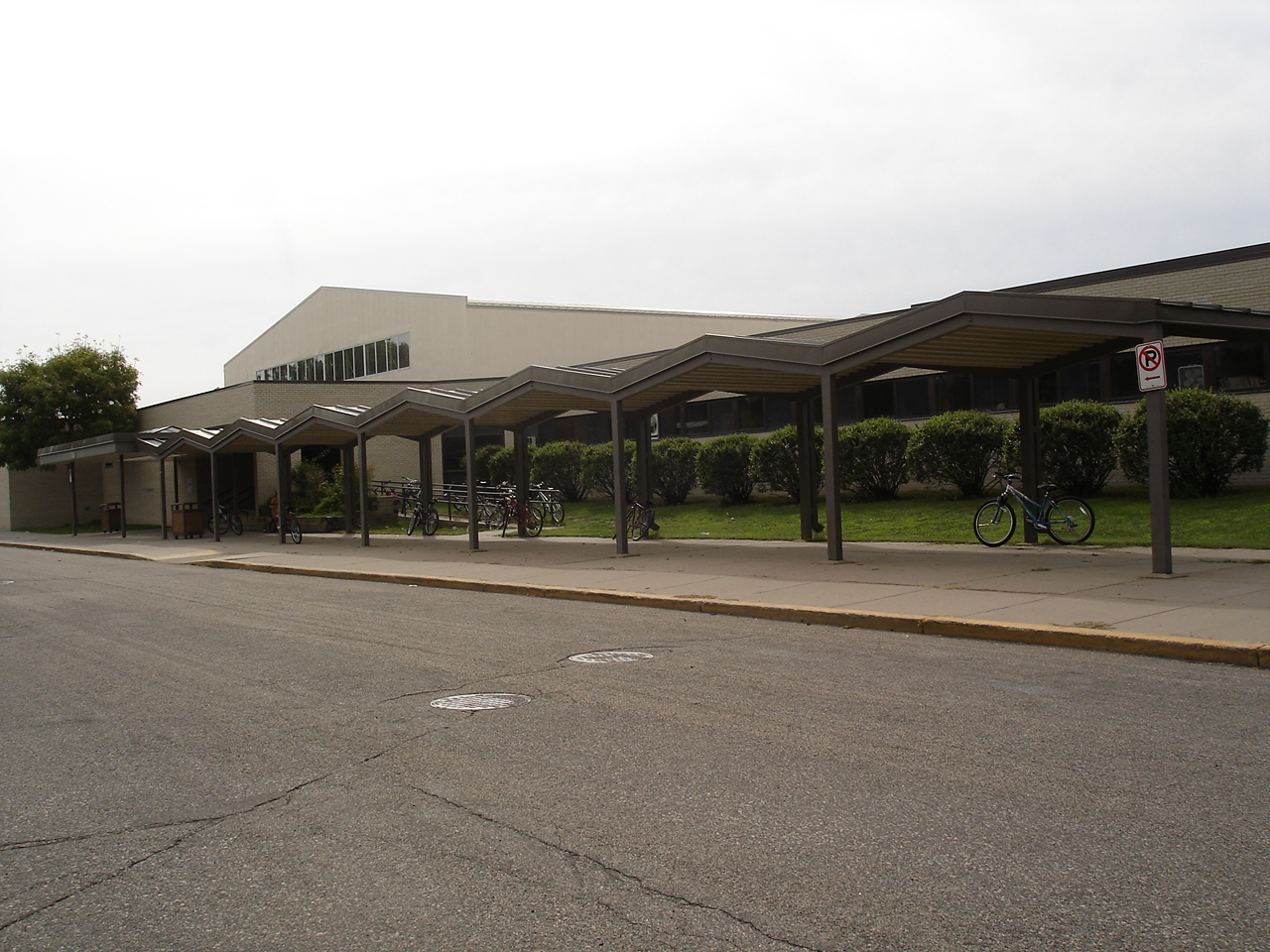
Como Park Senior High School opened its doors for classes in 1979 and remained the youngest high school in the district until Arlington Senior High opened in 1997.

=== Primary ===
- Adams Spanish Immersion
- Ames Elementary
- Battle Creek Elementary
- Capitol Hill Gifted/Talented Magnet
- Community of Peace Academy
- Eastern Heights Elementary
- EXPO for Excellence Magnet Elementary School
- Four Seasons A+ Elementary
- Friends School of Minnesota
- Groveland Park Elementary
- Harambee Elementary
- Hayden Heights Elementary
- Horace Mann Elementary
- Jackson Preparatory Magnet
- Jie Ming Mandarin Immersion Academy
- L'Etoile du Nord French Immersion School
- Longfellow Humanities Elementary and Magnet School
- Nativity of Our Lord
- Nokomis Montessori Magnet
- North End Elementary
- Saint Anthony Park Elementary School
- St. John Lutheran School
- St. Pascal Baylon
- Webster Magnet Elementary
- (and more not listed)

=== Public Secondary ===
- Central High School
- Como Park Senior High School
- Harding High School
- Johnson Senior High School
- Arlington Senior High School
- Battle Creek Middle School
- Cleveland Junior High School
- Creative Arts Senior High School
- Hazel Park Academy Middle School
- Highland Park Junior High School
- Highland Park Senior High School
- Humboldt Junior High School
- Humboldt Senior High School
- Murray Junior High School
- Open School
- Ramsey Junior High School
- Saint Paul Conservatory for the Performing Artists
- Twin Cities Academy
- Washington Technology Middle School

=== Private Secondary ===
- Cretin-Derham Hall High School
- St. Paul Academy and Summit School
- Saint Bernard's High School
- Saint Agnes High School
- Hill-Murray High School
- (and more not listed)

== List of Post-Secondary schools ==
Saint Paul is second in the United States in the number of higher education institutions per capita.

=== Public Post-Secondary ===
- Metropolitan State University
- Saint Paul College - A community and technical college
- University of Minnesota, Twin Cities

=== Private Post-Secondary ===
- Bethel University (Currently located in Arden Hills although historically in St. Paul)
- College of Saint Catherine
- College of St. Scholastica
- College of Visual Arts (Closed)
- Concordia University, Saint Paul
- Hamline University
- Macalester College
- McNally Smith College of Music
- University of St. Thomas

=== Post-Graduate ===
- William Mitchell College of Law
- Luther Seminary
- University of Minnesota - various Master's, Doctoral, and Professional programs, including Veterinary Medicine
- Hamline University - Law School, Business School, and School of Education
- Saint Paul Seminary School of Divinity
- Metropolitan State University
