= Arlington Senior High School =

Coordinates: 44.986428°N 93.110571°W

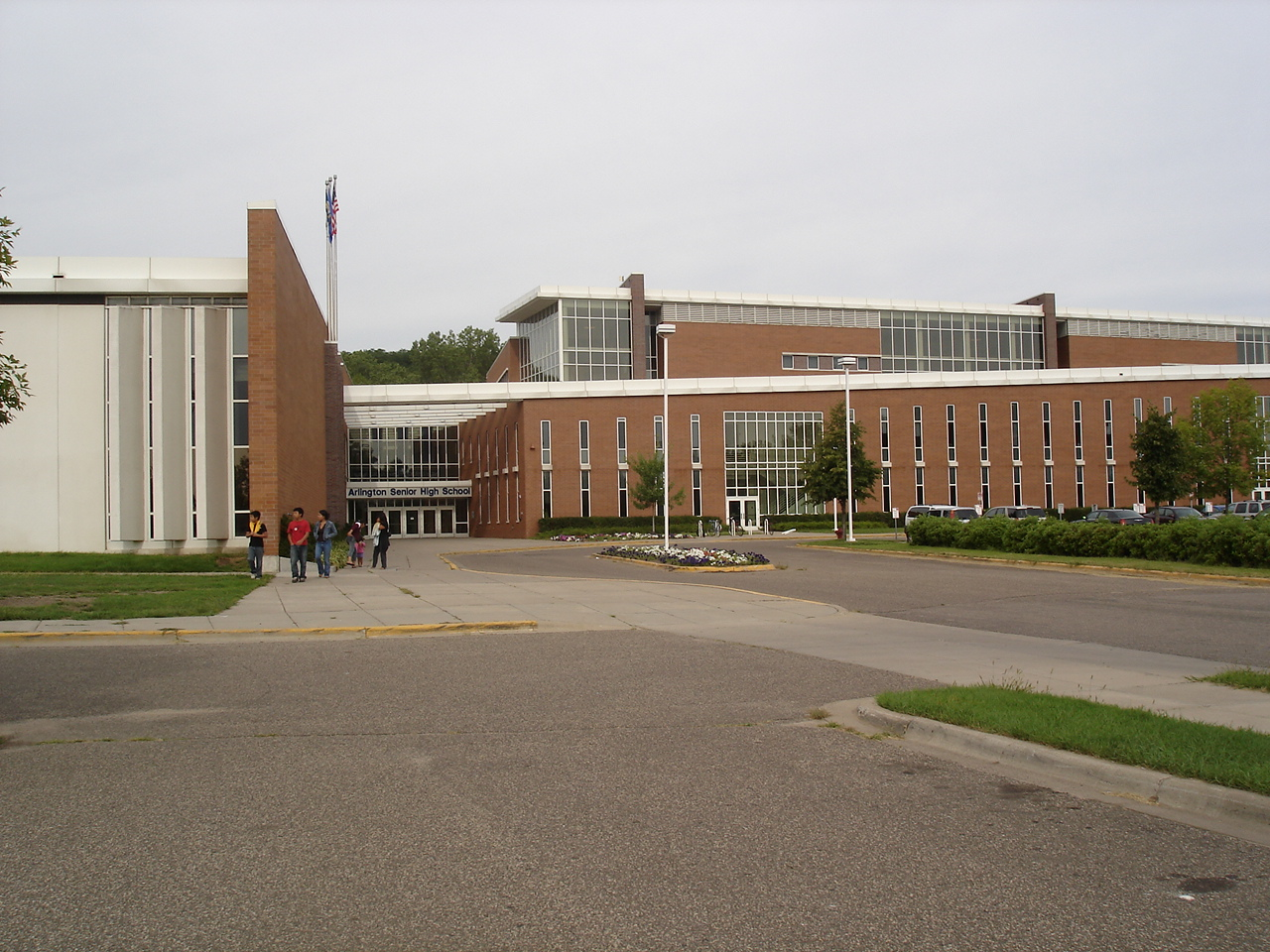
- Saint Paul, Minnesota; United States

Information
- Type: Public
- Established: 1996
- Closed: 2011
- School district: Saint Paul Public Schools
- Grades: 9–12
- Campus: Urban
- Colors: Blue and White
- Mascot: Phoenix
- Website: www.arlington.spps.org

Arlington Senior High School was a public high school in Saint Paul, Minnesota, United States. It was located in the city's North End neighborhood, north of Downtown Saint Paul. Arlington opened on September 3, 1996, and was the district's first new high schools since Humboldt Senior High School opened twenty years earlier.

By 2010, the school enrolled only 875 students in grades 9–12, despite having operated near its capacity of 2,000 during the years it was open. The school consistently served a population that was around 95% students of color, 50-60% ELL, and 90-95% students on free/reduced price lunch. The school was closed after the 2010–2011 school year.

Arlington was the only high school in Saint Paul with no attendance boundaries and enrolled students from throughout the city. Beginning in the 2009 school year, the school's main educational focus was "Bio-SMART," a program that emphasizes bioscience and the use of technology in health care. The school offered several Advanced Placement classes as well as several College in the Schools classes, in conjunction with the University of Minnesota.

Following the school's closure, Washington Middle School took over the school grounds and the school is now known as the Washington Technology Magnet School, hosting grades 6-12 and continuing the Bio-SMART program, fulfilling the ultimate goal of Arlington Senior High School.

== History ==
As early as 1991 the school district began to plan for an additional high school. Initial projections were to add 2 new high schools to the then 6 operating by 2000. However, a lack of funds allowed the construction of only one high school. The increasing number of children who attend public rather than non-public schools was attributed to part of the need. In 1974, 53% of children born in St. Paul later entered kindergarten in the city public schools. In 1990, 67% of the city's children attended public schools. Overcrowding was so severe, that in 1992 a citizen's group recommended moving 9th grade back into junior high buildings. The overcrowding was blamed on a surge in the birthrate in Saint Paul and a sudden influx of students from the suburbs, an unusual occurrence in an inner city school district. Plans for a "high tech" high school were put in place in as early as 1992.

=== Construction ===
In order to accommodate an estimated 4,000 additional students, existing commercial buildings were sought to convert into high school buildings. After scouring the city, two possible sites were chosen. One near the Minnesota State Fairgrounds and the other near the school's current location. The proposed area was the former site of an auto scrap yard. Officials were worried that the location would be polluted and would require an expensive cleanup. As a result, the location was moved to a site approximately .5 miles (0.80 km) west. Of the current 29 acres (0.05 sq mi; 0.12 km^{2}) acre campus, roughly 20 acres (0.03 sq mi; 0.08 km^{2}) were from a failed housing project and the other 9 acres (0.01 sq mi; 0.04 km^{2}) were from homes that were bought and cleared. Some of the soil on the site was unstable and was replaced. Critics considered the location for being too close to Como Park and Johnson high schools and for being located in a residential neighborhood. Original estimates for the project cost $54.3 million and as a result the Saint Paul school district authorized a $20 million bond. Knutson Construction Co. was chosen for the project.

=== Naming ===
The high school was the first new high school to be built in Saint Paul or Minneapolis since the 1970s. The school district was also not expecting to build another high school for 40 years after. As a result, the competition to name the school was fierce. The name Arlington High School was eventually chosen from a list of 85 suggestions. Two names, Arlington and Mechanic Arts, were quickly favored. Mechanic Arts was the initial favorite after alumni of the former school campaigned for the name to be reused after the first Mechanic Arts High School was closed down in 1976 after operating for 86 years. The alumni created a lobbying group and even enlisted the help of U.S. Supreme Court Justice Harry Blackmun, a 1925 graduate of Mechanic Arts. However, the school board's policy of naming schools after local neighborhoods and street names eventually won out with the name Arlington being chosen in a 5–2 vote. The chosen school colors, blue and white, were the colors of Mechanic Arts.

=== Closing ===
In the spring of 2010, Saint Paul Public Schools faced a $27.2 million budget shortfall. To save money, plans to close the school began. The school's projected enrollment would only be 650 students. 2009–2010 Juniors would have been allowed to graduate from Arlington as the high school's last class but only half of the required number of students committed to attending Arlington for the 2010–2011 school year. The district set a goal of 150 Junior students staying for a viable program. 2009–10 Juniors and Sophomores were required to transfer to other schools with Freshmen able to stay on as part of Washington Middle School's BioSmart program.

The high school was closed for the 2010–2011 school year with Washington Middle School's grades 7–10 taking over the school's space. Eventually Washington Middle School took over the space, and the former Arlington Senior High School is now known as the Washington Technology Magnet School, hosting grades 6-12.

== Campus ==
Before the school was built, many of the high schools in the Saint Paul Public Schools District were not up to date in technology. Consequently, an emphasis was placed on technology being built into the school and providing the ability to add to the existing facilities in the future. The school has extensive high tech facilities. The entire campus comprises 29 acres (120,000 m^{2}) in a residential neighborhood. The outside of the building is composed of tall narrow windows and a curving facade which has led to one architectural critic comparing it to a suburban office park. The "houses" that the freshmen and sophomores are divided into can be seen as wings projecting from the building. The houses were planned to separate the school into manageable sections so that the school does not seem as large to the students.

== Students ==
Students were enrolled from throughout the city. Often the school was used to reassign students who could not be enrolled into other high schools. As of the 2006–2007 school year, Arlington enrolled 1,825 students. The plurality were Asian, at 48%, with Black, 35% and Hispanic, 11% being the other major ethnic groups. 5% of students identified as White. The school had the highest rate of poverty in high schools from the Saint Paul Public School system with 89% of students qualifying for Free and Reduced Price Lunch. Free and Reduced Price Lunch is the measure of poverty for the district. The school had a large percentage of students who have limited English proficiency (58%). 14% of students qualify for special education. The school had an Adequate Yearly Progress graduation rate of 83% while roughly three out of five students who initially enrolled graduated within 4 years. 35% of students had grade level reading proficiency and 13% of students had proficiency in mathematics. Enrollment dropped considerably in the last years with only 875 students enrolled in 2010 and projections of only 650 for 2011.

== Education ==
As the first new high school built in several years, many unorthodox ideas were suggested. After many of the ideas were criticized the school district requested parental input on the direction of the school's curriculum and held meetings around the city to show their plans for the curriculum. School officials wished to create a balance of college prep classes and vocational programs. The school was planned as a citywide magnet school with no attendance boundary. An emphasis on technology was integrated into the plans for the school.

Arlington offered language classes in French and Spanish. The school also participated in the University of Minnesota's College in the Schools program. Advanced Placement classes were also offered. Arlington used a teaching program called "Small Learning Communities". These smaller learning communities separated particular student interests into different areas of the school. They provide goal- or interest-oriented learning. Freshmen and sophomores were separated into "houses" of smaller learning groups. Upper classmen followed specified career paths. Originally the school was opened with four focus areas; liberal arts, medical and environmental sciences, informational technologies and communication and policy-making and government but beginning with the 2008–2009 school year those career paths had changed.

In October 2007, the school received a three-year, $6 million grant from the U.S. Department of Education to help transform the school. The grant was used to create a "Bio-Smart" school for grades 11-12. The money was used for hiring additional staff and adding more high-tech equipment and supplies to the school's "extensive" existing facilities. Students were to choose between three career pathways: bioengineering and technology, bio-business and marketing or biomedical and health sciences. Students would take elective classes related to their pathway as well as core classes, such as math and English. The grant was sought to help reinvent the school. Arlington had the lowest test scores and highest concentration of poverty for Saint Paul Public Schools. In addition, the school was described as an "academically struggling high school". As a result of not meeting Adequate Yearly Progress as a part of No Child Left Behind Arlington faced restructuring. However, the school's restructuring was already underway with the biotech program.

== Extracurricular activities ==
In 2006, the Saint Paul Neighborhood Network's youth department produced a short video, reporting on Arlington's diminishing financial support for its art program, a video that would win SPNN the 2007 Alliance for Community Media Hometown Video Award for Visual Art-Youth entry. Arlington was one of three schools in Minnesota and one of two in Saint Paul to have a Naval Junior Reserve Officers' Training Corps unit. Arlington's NJROTC unit was named a Distinguished Unit for the fifth consecutive year. Only 20 percent of units earn the Distinguished Unit recognition yearly. The Mural is the school's student published newspaper. Issues are published monthly. A number of partnerships with community organizations are offered. Local colleges such as Saint Paul College, Century College and the University of Minnesota's Carlson School of Management. Internships with local multinational conglomerate 3M are also offered. The school also participates in Upward Bound with the University of Minnesota, Advancement Via Individual Determination Program (AVID) and Admission Possible, a program that helps low-income students attend college. The school has a Multicultural Excellence Program (MEP) that gives guidance to students of color who wish to earn a college degree.

=== Athletics ===
Arlington was a member of the Minnesota State High School League. The school's athletic teams competed in the Saint Paul City Conference. In the first year the school opened, the athletic teams only competed in junior varsity competitions. The following year, the school competed fully with varsity teams.

Arlington offered nine boys' and nine girls' varsity sports. These include football (boys), wrestling (boys), tennis (boys and girls), basketball (boys and girls), baseball (boys), softball (girls), golf (boys and girls), soccer (boys and girls), volleyball (girls), badminton (girls), cross country (boys and girls) and track and field (boys and girls). Sports that are not offered at Arlington were played in co-ops with other Saint Paul City Conference members.
