= Saint Paul City Conference =

- Classification: MSHSL
- Founded: 1898
- No. of teams: 7
- Headquarters: Saint Paul, Minnesota
- Region: Minnesota

The Saint Paul City Conference is the athletic conference for seven high schools in the city of Saint Paul, Minnesota, United States. Much like the divisions in professional sports, the Saint Paul City Conference is one of many in the state that divides schools in close proximity into different conferences. It is the second oldest conference in the state behind the Minneapolis City Conference. The conference officially began on Friday, October 28, 1898 when Central High School and Mechanic Arts High School played the first football game between the schools.

== Members ==
Institution	Location (Population)	Founded	Joined City Conference	Affiliation	Enrollment	Nickname
Central High School	Saint Paul, Minnesota (287,151)	1866	1898	Public	2,124	Minutemen
Como Park High School	Saint Paul, Minnesota (287,151)	1979	1979	Public	1,528	Cougars
Harding Senior High School	Saint Paul, Minnesota (287,151)	1926	1926	Public	2,070	Knights
Highland Park High School	Saint Paul, Minnesota (287,151)	1964	1964	Public	1,469	Scots
Humboldt Senior High School	Saint Paul, Minnesota (287,151)	1889	1898	Public	858	Hawks (formerly the Indians)
Johnson Senior High School	Saint Paul, Minnesota (287,151)	1897	1898	Public	1,887	Governors
Washington Technology Magnet School	Saint Paul, Minnesota (287,151)		2012	Public	2080 (6-12)	Eagles

Former member	Location (Population)	Founded	Member of City Conference	Affiliation	Enrollment	Nickname
Arlington Senior High School	Saint Paul, Minnesota (287,151)	1996	1997-2011	Public	875	Phoenix
Cretin-Derham Hall High School	Saint Paul, Minnesota (287,151)	1871	1977-2003	Private/Catholic	1,318	Raiders
Saint Thomas Academy	Mendota Heights, Minnesota (11,594)	1885	1977-1987	Private/Catholic	704	Cadets
Hill-Murray School	Maplewood, Minnesota (34,947)	1958	1977-1987	Private/Catholic	1,025	Pioneers

== History ==
The conference originally had four members: Central, Cleveland, Humboldt and Mechanic Arts. In 1911, Cleveland High School changed its name to Johnson High School, and in the 1920s Washington High School and Harding High School joined the conference. In 1941 the smaller high schools of Marshall High School, Monroe High School, Murray High School and Wilson High School were added to the conference, bringing the number of schools in the conference to ten. In 1953, Marshall closed as a senior high and ten years later, Wilson would also close, with most of its students attending the newly built Highland Park High School. In 1976, one of its original members, Mechanic Arts, was closed, and in a span of two years from 1977 to 1978, Monroe, Washington, and Murray high schools would do the same. Most of the students from Washington and Murray were incorporated into Como Park Senior High School.

=== Addition and dropping of private schools ===
In 1977, the conference added four private schools from the Saint Paul area: Cretin, Derham Hall, Hill-Murray and St. Thomas Academy. The decision to admit the schools had mixed support. The Saint Paul School Board approved the addition 7-0 while the St. Paul Athletic Council voted against the addition as well as the City Conference Coaches 95-4. In January 1986 the Saint Paul Athletic Council and the Public Schools coaches both voted to drop the four private schools and have a six team public school conference. Coaches were concerned that the private schools were winning a disproportionate amount of conference titles and had several unfair advantages. The private schools were able to attract students from throughout the Metro Area while the public schools were limited to neighborhood boundaries. In April of that year the Saint Paul School Board voted 5-1 to drop Hill-Murray and Saint Thomas Academy. The board acted on a March recommendation by the Saint Paul Public Schools superintendent and a two-year study by the Saint Paul Public School Coaches' Association. Cretin High School and Derham Hall High School were allowed to remain because they were located within the Saint Paul City limits. The vote also let St. Bernard's, St. Agnes and St. Paul Academy join the Conference if they desired although they all were in different athletic conferences.

The decision allowed Saint Thomas Academy and Hill-Murray to remain for the 1986-1987 school year and guaranteed them a non-conference schedule during the 1987-1988 school year but forced them to find a new conference for the 1989-1990 school year or to schedule games as an independent. Hill-Murray and Saint Thomas Academy applied for entry into the Twin Cities Federation or Umbrella Conference, then a twenty three school athletic conference split into three distinct conferences. Hill-Murray was accepted into the North Suburban division while Saint Thomas Academy was rejected for not meeting the criteria of the original twenty three schools. Saint Thomas Academy applied twice to seven different conferences but was rejected by all of them including the Saint Paul Suburban Conference three times. A month after Hill-Murray and St. Thomas were dropped the Minnesota State Legislature held a legislative task force to discuss the Minnesota State High School League's role in placing school's in athletic conferences. The MSHSL stated that they did not want the authority to do so. However, in the following year in the Spring of 1987 the Minnesota State Legislature passed a law requiring the Minnesota State High School League to place a high school in a conference if certain conditions were met. Eventually in the Spring of 1988, the Minnesota State High School league placed Saint Thomas Academy in the Saint Paul Suburban Conference, a member of the Twin Cities Federation

=== Dropping of Cretin ===
In 1987 Cretin and Derham Hall merged into a co-ed facility to form Cretin-Derham Hall High School. In September 1996 the athletic directors of the seven public high schools voted to recommend the exclusion of Cretin when the new Arlington High School began competing in varsity sports for the 1997-1998 season. Whenever the public school coaches were polled about removing Cretin they were overwhelmingly in favor. They offered to allow Cretin play the conference as an independent and as a result not be eligible for Conference titles or awards. The following spring the Saint Paul Public Schools superintendent decided not to bring the issue to the school board, which had the authority to drop Cretin. The superintendent cited that the issue was too political to remove the only Catholic school in a heavily Catholic city. He also reasoned that it would be better to improve the competitive level of the public schools including the elementary and junior high sports teams. That plan would have cost seven figures and was quickly discarded. In the fall of 1998 Cretin expressed interest in joining a new athletic conference. In 1999 supporters of Humboldt High School asked the Saint Paul Public Schools superintendent to either remove Cretin or find a new conference for Humboldt to compete in because of the large gap in talent. A month later the public school's athletic directors agreed to support a proposal to remove Cretin for the 2000-2001 school year. Cretin applied at the same time to the now defunct St. Paul Suburban Conference.

In March 2002 Cretin began making steps away from the Saint Paul City Conference. The football team announced plans to compete as an independent beginning in the fall of 2002. The team later agreed to play the Classic Lake Conference schools in 2003 and 2004 as an independent. After the 2002-2003 season, Cretin-Derham Hall left the conference and began competition in the Suburban East Conference. Nine conferences had rejected Cretin before the Minnesota State High School league placed Cretin in the Suburban East Conference. The Suburban East Conference and Cretin both appealed the decision but it was upheld. Cretin had wanted to be placed in the Classic Suburban Conference.

=== Recent history ===
The most recent addition was in 1996 when the newly built Arlington Senior High School joined. Arlington did not compete at the varsity level in athletics until the fall of 1997.

== Twin Cities Conference ==
In 1985 Minneapolis proposed merging the Saint Paul and Minneapolis City Conferences. One plan had a two division alignment with Saint Paul and Minneapolis schools in separate divisions. The ease at scheduling non-conference games with teams from the other division was seen as acceptable to Minneapolis officials. The proposal did not happen but talks returned the following year when the Saint Paul City Conference was planning to remove the four private schools from the conference. At that time the scheduling proposal was seen as being more restrictive and not favorable to Minneapolis administrators. Saint Paul ended the possibility several months later in April 1986 when the Saint Paul Public School Board voted to withdraw its invitation for the Minneapolis City Conference to join with the Saint Paul schools for a Twin Cities Conference.
