= Edward Larson (disambiguation) =

Edward J. Larson (born 1953) is an American lawyer and historian. Edward Larson may also refer to:

- G. Edward Larson (1920–1994), U.S. government worker
- Edward Larson (Kansas judge) (born 1932), Justice of the Kansas Supreme Court

== See also ==
- Edward Lawson (disambiguation)
