= Frederick P. Memmer =

American politician (1907–1984)

Frederick Philip Memmer Sr. (June 15, 1907 – February 1, 1984) was an American lawyer and politician.

Memmer was born in Saint Paul, Minnesota and went to the Saint Paul parochial and public schools. He graduated from Johnson High School, in Saint Paul, University of Minnesota, and University of Minnesota Law School. He lived in Saint Paul, Minnesota with his wife and family and practiced law in Saint Paul. He served as city attorney for Minneapolis, Minnesota and for Little Canada, Minnesota. Memmer served in the Minnesota House of Representatives from 1939 to 1950 and was a Republican. Memmer died in an automobile accident in Phoenix, Arizona.
