= City Academy High School =

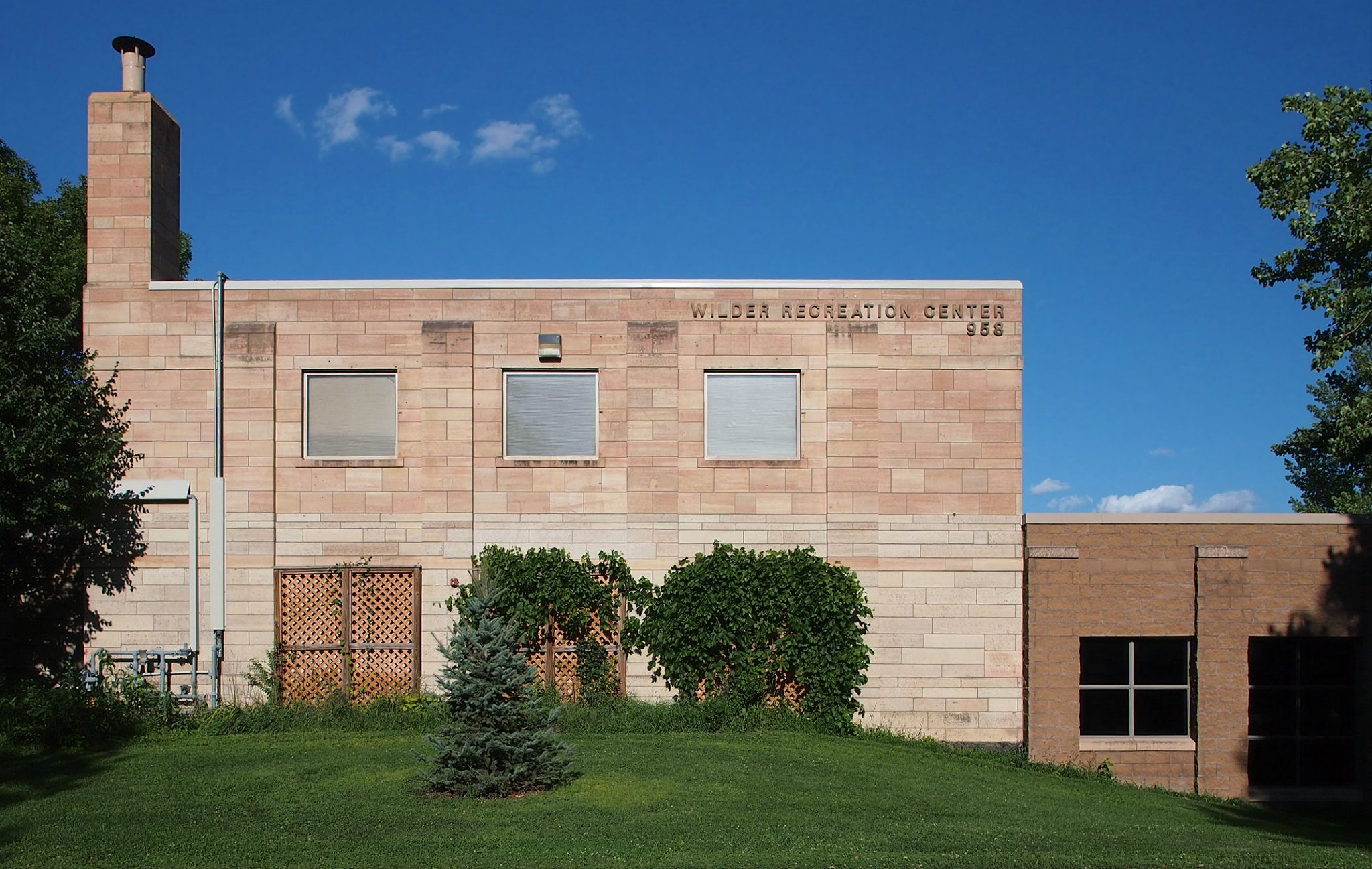
- Main location of City Academy High School in Wilder Recreation Center

Location
- 958 Jessie Street; Saint Paul, Minnesota 55130; United States; 44°58′11.5″N 93°4′37″W

Information
- Type: Charter school
- Established: 1992
- School district: Independent (Charter school)
- Principal: Milo Cutter
- Faculty: 13
- Grades: 10–12
- Enrollment: 117
- Campus: Various urban places
- Website: http://www.cityacademy.org/

City Academy High School is a charter school in Saint Paul, Minnesota, United States. The school was created a year after charter school legislation in Minnesota was passed. As a charter school, it operates independently, but is sponsored by the College of St. Catherine. On September 7, 1992, City Academy became the first charter school in the United States to open.

City Academy operates in a variety of buildings in Saint Paul. The majority of classes are held at a local recreation center in Saint Paul. City Academy enrolls students 15–21 years of age who have previously dropped out of school or are not currently attending school. The school was created to aid students in at-risk demographics.

== History ==
In 1991 Minnesota became the first state in the United States to pass legislation that allowed charter schools. Several proposals for schools were quickly proposed, including City Academy. The school was the third charter school approved by the Minnesota Department of Education, but the first to open. The proposal won support from mayor James Scheibel, several neighborhood parents, and Northern States Power Company. However the charter school received opposition from the Saint Paul Federation of Teachers.

Milo Cutter (teacher), Barron Chapman (recreation leader), and Terry Kraabel (teacher) were the three people who started the school. The initial proposal for the school was designed for students who have dropped out of school. The school was also designed for students whose homes were wracked by poverty or substance abuse. The proposal included having the students do things such as building homes for Habitat for Humanity, learning art at local pottery studios, and studying biology at local nature centers. The proposal allowed students to work toward their high school diploma or try to get back into a more traditional high school. The proposal was to serve 30 Saint Paul students ages 13 to 19 who have dropped out of school or are at risk for dropping out. Since then, the school has expanded, but is kept small to keep small class sizes.

Northern States Power eventually donated computers to the school and provided $30,000 in startup money. The predicted annual budget was $200,000. The school received about $120,000 in state education funding, the remainder coming from fundraising efforts. City Academy was modeled after a program called Power League a year before. Plans are for the year-round school to open in August, said Milo Cutter, Power League director. In addition to offering classes in academic subjects, the program offers support groups, counseling, individualized case management, job skills training, community service, and recreational activities. On September 7, 1992, City Academy became the first charter school in the United States to open.

== Operation ==
For $302 a month, City Academy rents space from the city of Saint Paul in the Wilder Recreation Center, a bunkerlike East Side building constructed in 1941. Classes run from 8 a.m. to 8 p.m. and are offered year-round. In 1996, the school's annual operating budget was $320,000.

Students often remodel East Side houses on weekends and after school. City Academy was originally sponsored by Saint Paul Public Schools but has been sponsored by St. Catherine since 1999. City Academy has been sponsored by the College of St. Catherine in Saint Paul since the 1999–2000 school year. The school is accredited by the North Central Accreditation Association. The main site of the school is at the Wilder Recreation Center, but classes are held in other areas such as recreation centers. Of the seven members of the charter board, two of them are from the community.

=== Programs ===
City Academy has participated in a program called Youthbuild since 1993. This national nonprofit organization supports 200 local programs that help young people work toward their high school diplomas while learning construction skills by building affordable housing for low-income and homeless people.

Students are given the home phone numbers of teachers and encouraged to call them for help after regular school hours. Students who are enrolled full-time spend three hours a day in classroom learning and three hours on a job site. The school features four days of interdisciplinary courses and electives a week; students spend the fifth day in the community doing other educational activities.

== Student body ==
In the sponsorship charter with the College of St. Catherine, City Academy's "...target population [is] primarily 15–21 year old students who are currently unenrolled, underprepared, and at risk for dropping out." 90.4% of students are minorities, and 86% of the student body qualifies for free or reduced lunch. Before attending City Academy, over 90% of students did not currently attend a school. Some students even enroll after being released from juvenile correctional facilities. There are no grade distinctions based on the number of school years completed. Once students complete the graduation requirements of the school, they graduate.

== Success ==
BST passing percentage
	Upon enrollment	After graduation
Writing BST	67	90
Reading BST	36	90
Math BST	23	82

86% of students of the students had not passed the Minnesota Basic Skills Tests (BST) prior to enrollment. Passing BSTs in Writing, Math, and Reading are required to graduate from high school in Minnesota.

A study by the University of Minnesota found that in the 1996–1997 school year "...students (on average) have made at least three years' academic gain in both reading and math."

The school has a 100% Adequate Yearly Progress graduation rate. Other graduation indicators, such as the National Governors Association rate, have lower percentages, such as 52.7% by AYP measure the rate of students who originally enroll eventually graduate. NGA measures the rate of students who graduate in four years. City Academy does not have traditional grade distinctions that are used in the NGA method. During City Academy's first three years of operation, the school graduated 78 students; only 11 students dropped out. Again, most students who enroll have previously dropped out of school.

== Impact ==
Due to being the first charter school in the United States, the school has received a lot of attention in the media. City Academy has been visited by U.S. President Bill Clinton, U.S. Department of Education secretary Richard Riley, and current U.S. senator and then-presidential candidate John Kerry.

In 1999, Milo Cutter, one of the founders of City Academy, was named by Teacher Magazine as one of the ten people who shaped education in the 1990s. Teacher Magazine credited Cutter's work with City Academy with helping launch the charter school movement nationwide. Due to City Academy's success, it has been said that City Academy "...serves as a talisman for the entire charter school movement."

== See also ==
- Education in Saint Paul, Minnesota
