= Jim Rantz =

- Pitcher
- Born: February 24, 1938 (age 87); Saint Paul, Minnesota, U.S.
- Bats: Right Throws: Right

Career highlights and awards
- Minnesota Twins Hall of Fame

James John Rantz (born February 24, 1938, at Saint Paul, Minnesota) is an American former professional baseball player and executive. He was the Minnesota Twins' farm system director from 1986–2012, holding the title of "Director of Minor Leagues." When he retired after his 27th consecutive season in the post, Rantz was one of the longest-tenured farm system directors in Major League Baseball; it was his 53rd consecutive season with the Twins' organization. From 1971 through 1985, Rantz was assistant minor league director under George Brophy. As such, during his career, he sent multiple generations of home-grown players to the Twins, and contributed materially to the team's 1987 and 1991 world titles and its run of playoff teams during the first decade of the 21st century.

== Playing career ==
A 5 ft 10 in (1.78 m), 175 lb (79 kg) right-handed relief pitcher, Rantz attended Washington High School in St. Paul (now Washington Technical Magnet School) then walked on at the University of Minnesota where he pitched (for Dick Siebert) and played hockey (for John Mariucci). Despite never having started a game in his collegiate (or later professional) career, Rantz pitched a complete game in the Gophers 2–1, 10 inning victory which gave Minnesota the 1960 College World Series title over the University of Southern California.

He signed with the Washington Senators in 1960 — a year before the franchise shifted to Minnesota. Rantz compiled a 22–16 won–loss mark with a 3.64 earned run average in five minor-league seasons. After serving as manager for the St. Cloud Rox, the Twins' affiliate in the Class A Northern League, for one season (1965), he moved into the club's front office in 1965.

== Front office ==
Originally hired by Brophy (then serving as the assistant director of farm clubs for the Twins) as an intern in the Twins' Media Relations department during the 1965 World Series, Rantz moved over four years later to work under Brophy. Other than a one-year stint in 1977 as manager of the Wisconsin Rapids Twins of the Class A Midwest League, Rantz worked for Brophy for the next 16 years. Following Brophy's retirement from the Twins in 1985 due to health problems, Rantz was promoted to succeed him as Director of Minor League Operations.

In recognition of his accomplishments as the team's player development boss for 22 years, Rantz was inducted into the Minnesota Twins Hall of Fame in 2007. On October 15, 2012, the Twins announced that Rantz would retire from his post at the end of the calendar year, after 53 years with the organization.
