= Edward Lawson =

Edward Lawson may refer to:

- Edward Lawson (VC) (1873–1955), British army soldier and recipient of the Victoria Cross
- Edward B. Lawson (1895–1962), American diplomat
- Edward C. Lawson, American civil rights activist
- Edward M. Lawson (born 1929), Canadian politician
- Edward Lawson, 4th Baron Burnham (1890–1963), British newspaper executive and Territorial Army officer

== See also ==
- Eddie Lawson (born 1958), motorcyclist
- Eddie Lawson (Waterloo Road), fictional character
- Edward Larson (disambiguation)
- Edward Levy-Lawson, 1st Baron Burnham (1833–1916), English newspaper proprietor
