= Johnson Senior High School (Saint Paul, Minnesota) =

Coordinates: 44°58′53″N 93°4′3″W

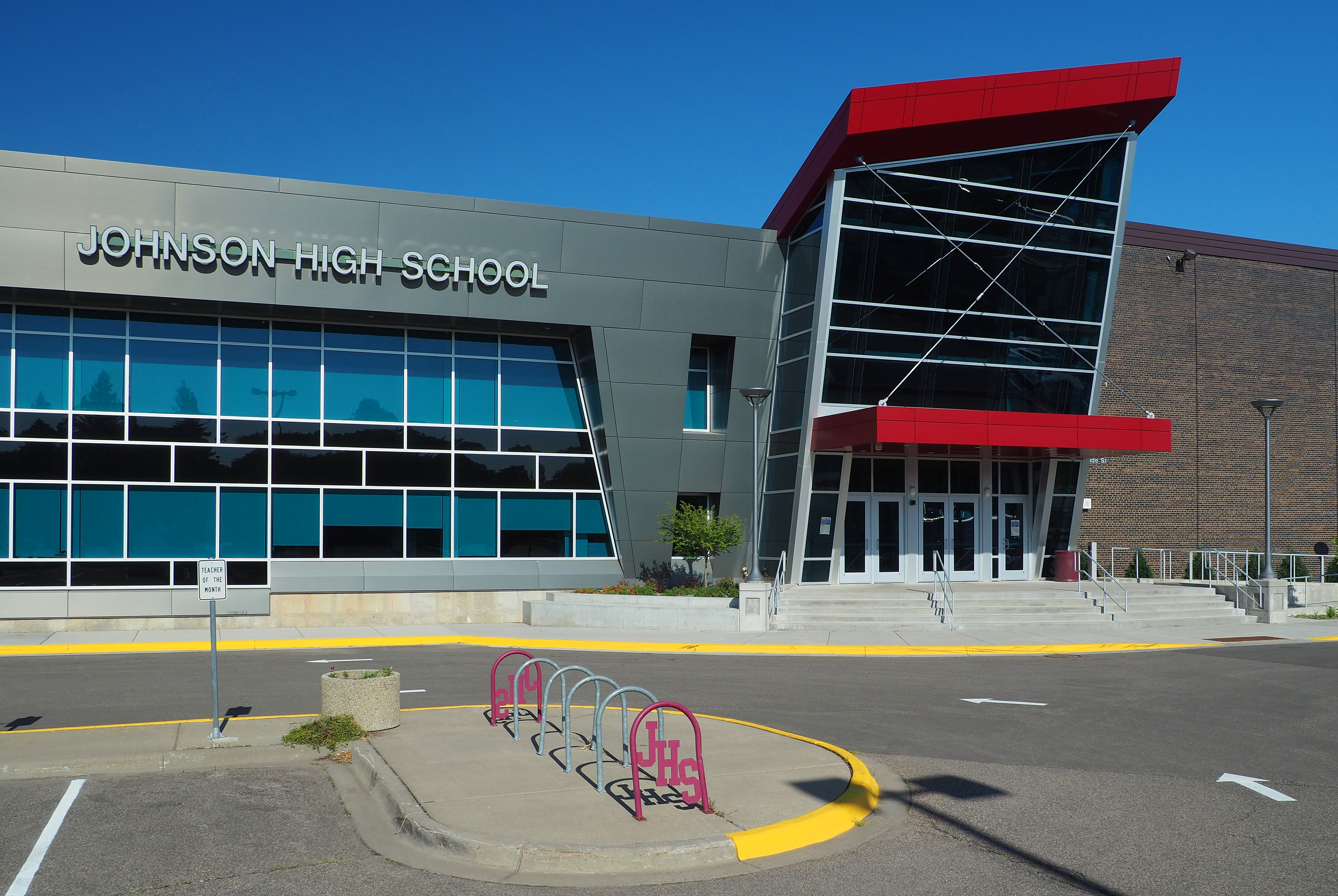
- Main entrance of the current Johnson Senior High School

Location
- 1349 Arcade Street; Saint Paul, Minnesota 55106; United States

Information
- Type: Public school
- Motto: "Pride of the East Side"
- Established: 1897
- Principal: Jamil Payton
- Faculty: 127
- Teaching staff: 56.45 (FTE)
- Grades: 9 to 12
- Enrollment: 1,076 (2024–2025)
- Student to teacher ratio: 19.06
- Campus: Urban
- Colors: Maroon; White
- Mascot: Governors
- Website: www.spps.org/johnsonsr

Johnson Senior High School is a comprehensive high school for grades 9 to 12 in Saint Paul, Minnesota, United States. Originally named Cleveland High School, the school was renamed after Minnesota governor John A. Johnson in 1911. Johnson is the second oldest high school in the Saint Paul Public Schools district and is only surpassed in age by Central High School. The school has operated in three different buildings since 1897, all located on the East Side of Saint Paul.

Johnson is the third largest high school in the district, and enrolls 1647 students. The school offers Advanced Placement classes as well as the University of Minnesota-affiliated College in the Schools program. In 2002 the school received a grant from the Bill & Melinda Gates Foundation which led to the introduction of eight Small Learning Communities.

Johnson offers over 40 extracurricular clubs and organizations including an Air Force Junior Reserve Officers' Training Corps (AFJROTC) unit, one of only three in the state. The school was a founding member and currently competes in the Saint Paul City Conference. The school's hockey team has had success, winning four state titles.

== History ==
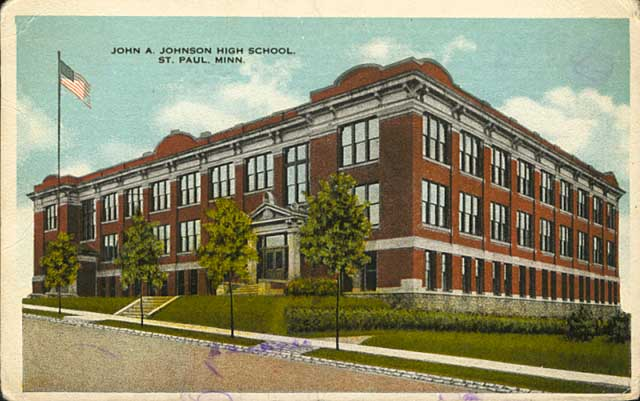
This building was home to Johnson High School from around 1911 to 1963.

Johnson High School was established in 1897, making it the second oldest high school in the Saint Paul Public Schools district and the oldest on the East Side of Saint Paul. The school was originally named Cleveland High School, after the U.S. President Grover Cleveland, although some sources state the school was named after Horace Cleveland, a local landscape architect.

In 1910 increasing enrollment and overcrowding led to the construction of a second school building at 740 York Avenue. The school was renamed John A. Johnson High School in honor of the recently deceased Minnesota governor John Albert Johnson (1861 – 1909). Students attended class at the second location from 1911 to 1963.

By 1959 overcrowding as a result of the post-World War II baby boom forced the construction of a third school building. Land was purchased in 1960 at the former site of Hastings Pond, which had been filled in during construction of Interstate 94 through Saint Paul, and the building was completed at a cost of $3,663,529. Johnson High School has been located at the third school building since the fall of 1963. Extensive renovations and expansion of the front part of the building were completed in 2017.

== Enrollment ==
Students may enroll from throughout the city, but most live on the East Side. Johnson is the third largest high school in the Saint Paul Public Schools district, with 1647 students attending in the 2006–2007 school year. The plurality of students identified as Asian, with 46%, while students identifying as Black and White composed 29% and 14% of the student body respectively. 10% of students identified as Hispanic and 2% American Indian. 81% qualified for free or reduced price lunch and 34% of students had limited English proficiency.

== Education ==
Small Learning Communities

- Arts, Communication & Humanities Academy
- Business, Marketing & Management Academy
- Architecture, Construction & Engineering Academy
- Education & Human Services Academy
- Health Sciences Academy
- Hospitality, Tourism & Recreation Academy
- Natural Resources & Environmental Sciences Academy

Johnson participates in the Advanced Placement (AP) program, offering college-level courses in twelve subject areas. Students can also earn college credit through College in the Schools (CIS) classes offered by the University of Minnesota, and Post Secondary Enrollment Options (PSEO) classes at area colleges and universities. Language classes in Spanish and French are offered.

In 2002 Johnson received $1.1 million in grants from the Bill and Melinda Gates Foundation and the U.S. Department of Education. Johnson used the money to create eight smaller learning communities for the 2003–2004 school year. In the first five years the graduation rate at Johnson increased 19%, with state-required 10th grade reading and writing tests also seeing double digit increases. The money from the grants ran out before the 2006–2007 school year.

Currently, there are eight smaller learning communities within the school. All students start in the Freshmen FOCUS Academy and then choose one of seven other academies for the remainder of their high school career, based on their interests.

Beginning with the class of 2006, graduating seniors are required to engage in the Senior Project, a program designed to showcase the skills students have developed during their stay at Johnson and as a practice for building a résumé or portfolio. The project consists of four main Ps: project, paper, portfolio and presentation. The students are required to work on a project outside of class that takes at least 15 hours. Their paper has to relate to their project, so if the project is creating a birdhouse, the paper could be about the best type of birdhouse. The portfolio then brings everything together with evidence to prove that the project was completed. The presentation is given at least three times and ties all of the items together. The projects are judged throughout the year, and the top four students receive a partial college scholarship.

== Extracurricular activities ==
=== Athletics ===
Johnson athletic programs competed in class AAAA of the Minnesota State High School League until the 2007–08 school year, when the school was moved to class AAA. The school was a founding member of the Saint Paul City Conference in 1898, when the school was still Cleveland High School.

The Governors have won the Saint Paul City Conference title for football 13 times, their last conference title coming in 2006.

Johnson's chief rival is Harding Senior High School, and the two football squads play each other annually for the Hatchet trophy. The rivalry is the oldest continuous one in the Saint Paul City Conference with the teams meeting each year since 1932.

In 2010, the Governors won their first boys' basketball state title, beating out Grand Rapids High School and capping off an undefeated season. Johnson made another state tournament appearance in 2006, but lost in the semi-finals to eventual state AAAA champion Hopkins.

==== Hockey ====
Johnson also has a history of success in ice hockey, including four state championships (1947, 1953, 1955, 1963), three second-place finishes, and three third-place finishes in 22 state tournament appearances. Johnson was the only Twin Cities high school to win the Minnesota high school boys' hockey tournament for the first 25 years.

Herb Brooks and Warren Strelow, who coached the Miracle on Ice gold medal-winning team, played on the school's 1955 state championship-winning team. Brooks' number five jersey was retired following his death in 2003.

During the 1950s the team played at Phalen Playground.

Most of the bantam hockey team players from the East Side attend either Johnson or Hill-Murray School. During the 1950s and 1960s Johnson was considered a feeder school for the University of Minnesota's ice hockey team.

Recently the school's sports teams have suffered from lack of enrollment. Along with Como Park, Johnson is the only Saint Paul City Conference school to field a hockey team. Starting with the 2025-2026 school year, Johnson will combine with other Saint Paul Public Schools high schools to form one hockey team.

=== Clubs and organizations ===
Johnson's literary magazine the Gleam was first published in 1912 but stopped publishing in 1926. In 1992 the magazine began again to help students improve scores on writing tests. The current literary annual is titled the Mirror.

Johnson is one of only three high schools in Minnesota to have an Air Force Junior Reserve Officers' Training Corps (AFJROTC). There are over 40 extracurricular clubs or organizations for students.

- 3M Step
- Anime Club
- Band
- Bible Study (AGAPE '11-'13, Son Seekers '13-'14)
- Billiards and Bard Club
- Choir
- College Possible (CP)
- Color Guard/AFJROTC
- Debate
- Drill Team/AFJROTC
- Educational Talent Search
- Flag Detail/AFJROTC
- Fresh Force, Service Learning, and Leadership Program
- Gay, Lesbian, Bi-sexual Transgender (GLBT) Support Group
- Gay-Straight Alliance (GSA)
- Habitat for Humanity Global Village
- Hangul Club
- Hip Hop Dance Club (HDC)
- Indian Education Program
- Jazz Band
- Johnson Asian Culture Club (JACC)
- Johnson Mirror (arts magazine)
- Johnson's K-pop Dance Crew (JKDC)
- Junior Class Board
- Latino Culture Club
- Link Crew
- Marching Band
- Math Team
- Multicultural Excellence Program (MEP)
- Multicultural Festival
- National Honor Society
- Newspaper
- Orchestra
- Ordway Honors Concert
- Pep Band
- Pit Orchestra
- Robotics Club
- Rocket-Model Club/AFJROTC
- Solo/Ensemble Contest
- Speech
- Sports Club
- Stage/Tech Crew
- Student Council
- Students Against Destructive Decisions (SADD)
- Theater/Drama
- Upward Bound
- Yearbook

== Notable alumni ==
- Louie Anderson, comedian and actor
- Wendell Anderson, former Minnesota Governor and Olympic medalist
- Les Auge, hockey player
- Tony L. Bennett, St. Paul Police Officer, Minnesota state legislator
- Alana Blahoski, Olympic Gold medalist in hockey
- Herb Brooks, hockey coach of the "Miracle on Ice" gold medal-winning U.S. Olympic hockey team, former NHL hockey coach
- Warren E. Burger, Chief Justice of the United States Supreme Court, 1969–1986
- Jean Follett, assemblage artist
- Robert J. Ferderer, Minnesota state legislator and businessman
- Ray Hitchcock, professional football player, formerly for the Washington Redskins
- G. Edward Larson, Harold Stassen’s aide and also special assistant to Under Secretary Elmer Bennett
- Emmanuel Matadi, sprinter who represented Liberia at three Olympic games
- Amy Peterson, three-time Olympic medalist
- Jerry Rusch, jazz trumpeter
- Warren Strelow, ice hockey goaltending coach
- Arnold Sundgaard, playwright
- Barry Tallackson, hockey player
- Thomas Tapeh, professional football player, formerly for the Minnesota Vikings
- Bruce Vento, U.S. congressman
