= Robert J. Ferderer =

American politician (1934–2009)

Member of the Minnesota House of Representatives from the 64A district

Personal details
- Party: Republican

Robert Joel Ferderer Sr. (June 3, 1934 – December 30, 2009) was an American politician and businessman.

Ferderer was born in Saint Paul, Minnesota and graduated from Johnson High School in Saint Paul. He lived in Saint Paul with his wife and family. He received his bachelor's degree in political science and his master's degree in counseling and psychology from the University of St. Thomas. Ferderer also took courses in theology and spirituality from St. Catherine University. He also took graduate courses at the University of Minnesota. Ferderer worked for 3M and was a marketing communications director. Ferderer served on several Minnesota Government Commissions involving crime prevention, law enforcement, national and community service, and medical practice. He served in the Minnesota House of Representatives in 1973 and 1974 representing district 64A and was a Republican. Ferderer died from complications due to Parkinson's disease at the Woodlyn Heights Health Care Center in Inver Grove Heights, Minnesota.
