= Murray Middle School =

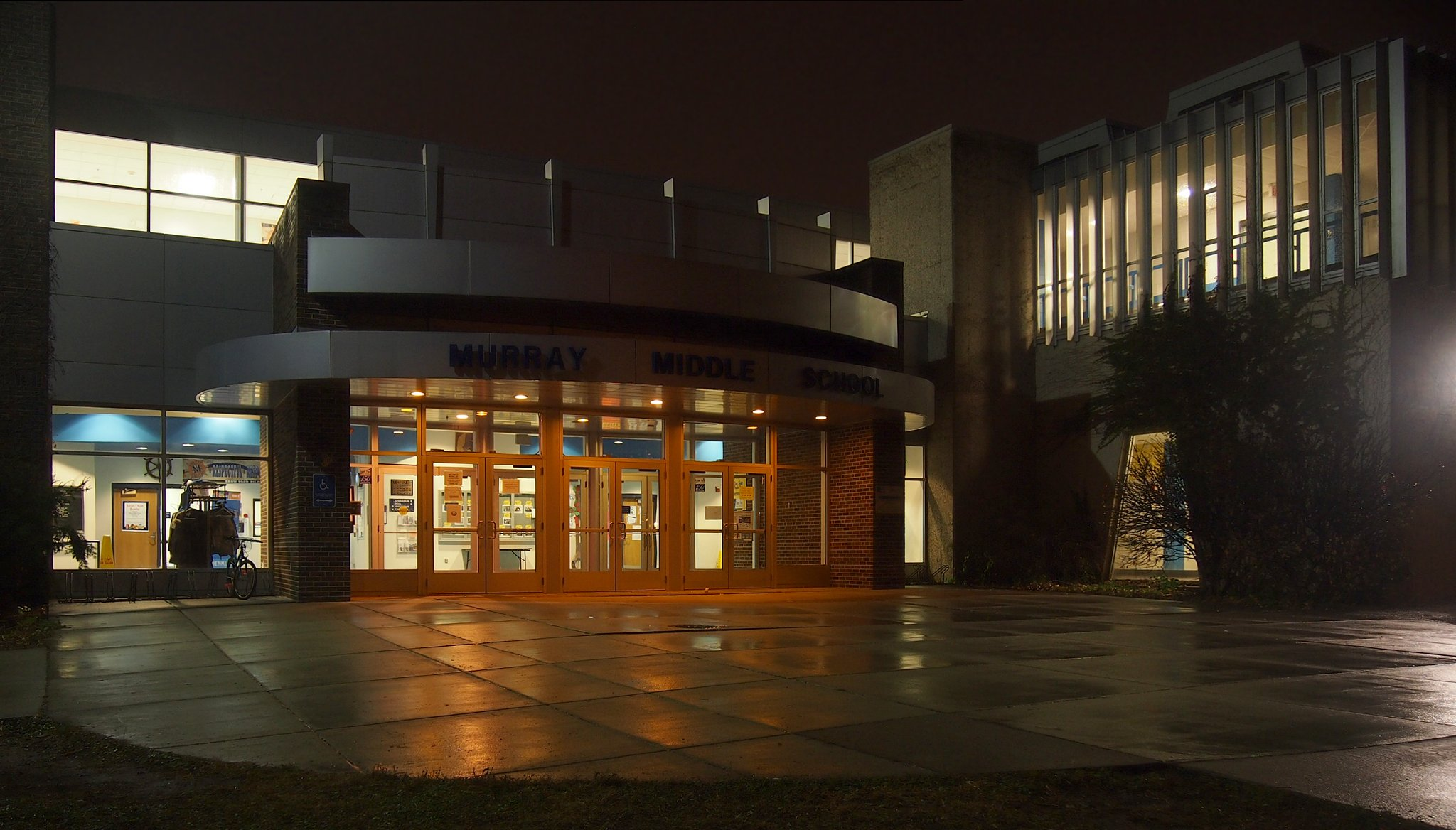
- Murray Middle School's main entrance

Location
- 2200 Buford Avenue; Saint Paul, Minnesota; United States
- Coordinates: 44°59′4″N 93°11′36″W

Information
- Type: Public middle school
- Established: 1926; 100 years ago
- School district: Saint Paul Public Schools
- Principal: Jamin McKenzie
- Faculty: 44.19 (FTE)
- Grades: 6–8
- Enrollment: 712 (2017-18)
- Student to teacher ratio: 16.11
- Website: murray.spps.org

Murray Middle School (formerly called Murray Junior High School) is a junior high school and a former high school in Saint Paul, Minnesota, United States. The school is part of the Saint Paul Public Schools district. As of 2022 the principal is Jamin Mackenzie. This school is not to be confused with Hill-Murray School, a private, Catholic high school located just outside St. Paul, Minnesota.

== History ==
Murrays building finished construction in 1925 and opened in February 1926 with 13 classrooms, a gym, and capacity for 500 students. In its first year, 200 students were enrolled in grades K-3 and 7-12. In 1930, a new wing was added nearly doubling the school in size. The construction of an auditorium wing and science labs underneath took place through 1939, opening in January 1940. The first graduating class was in June 1940, at which time 850 students were then enrolled in grades 7-12. During 1963 a new building was added with a new gym, bathhouse, pool, and additional science facilities to reduce overcrowding and double shifts caused the 1,100 enrolled students. In early 1979, a new library was opened.

After the 1979 school year, Murray was reopened as a general magnet for grades 7-9. Because of Murrays change to a junior high, as well as the similar change of transition of Washington Senior High to Washington Middle, the nearby Como Park Junior High School became Como Park Senior High School and took in the remaining Murray students alongside Central High School. In September 1980, Murray was changed to a 7-8 magnet school. A new front entry, new offices and two new classrooms were built in 2000.

In the 2006-2007 school year, Murray had 800 enrolled students.
