= LEAP High School =

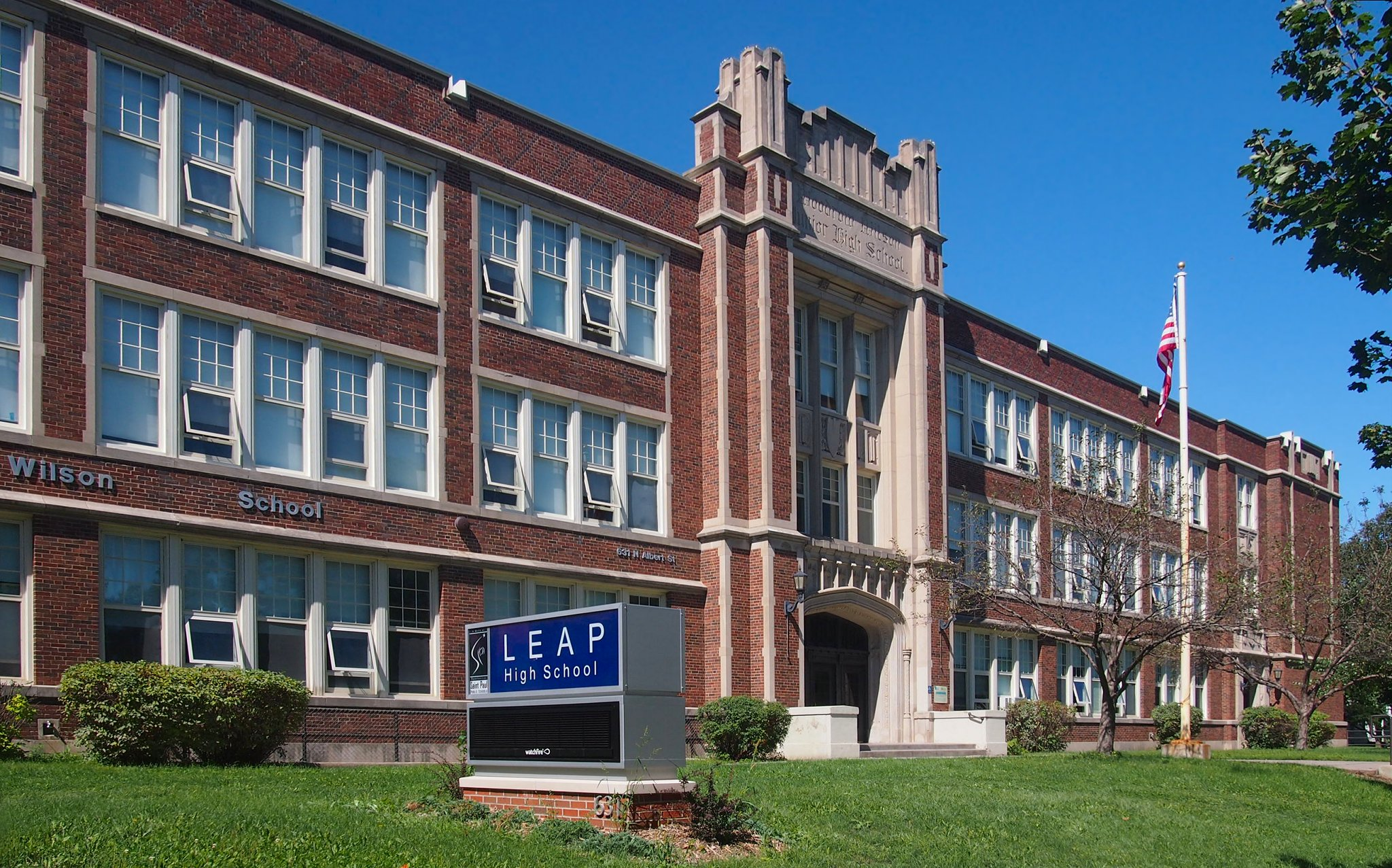
- LEAP High School from the southeast

Location
- 631 Albert Street North, Saint Paul, Minnesota; United States
- Coordinates: 44°57′38″N 93°9′36″W

Information
- Type: Public
- Established: 1994
- School district: Saint Paul Public Schools
- Principal: Be Vang
- Grades: 9–12, ELL
- Enrollment: 174 (2023-2024)
- Campus type: Urban
- Website: http://leap.spps.org/

LEAP High School is an Alternative Learning Center (ALC) high school for English Language Learners (ELL) that is part of the Saint Paul Public Schools system in Saint Paul, Minnesota, United States. It was founded in autumn of 1994 by Jeff Dufresne and Sandra Hall as a high school for newly arrived immigrants to the city of Saint Paul. Its student body is 100% immigrant and range in ages from 14 to 21. Its present principal is bilingual educator Be Vang.

== History ==
"LEAP" stands for Limited English Achievement Program and from 1994 to 2005, LEAP school was known as LEAP English Academy. However, with the influx of new immigrants from the Wat Tham Krabok refugee camp in Thailand, the name was changed to reflect a more clear image and mission of the school.

The original location of the school was on the 4th floor of the 494 Sibley Avenue building in Saint Paul. In August 2003 the school was moved to its present location of 631 Albert Street North, where it shared the building with the students and staff of the Wilson Middle School. During the summer of 2004, with the anticipation of new students arriving to Saint Paul, IA-LEAP was allowed to take over the entire building and, for unrelated reasons, the middle school component was closed.

The building dates to 1924 and was originally Woodrow Wilson Junior High School, named for the 28th US President. It was later Wilson High School, Wilson Elementary, Expo Middle School, and other variations. Throughout school name changes, it remained "the Wilson Building" while federal law prevented buildings named for US Presidents from being changed without the Secretary of the Interior's consent or an act of Congress, but that section of the US Code was repealed in 2014.

== Mission and student body ==
LEAP serves students who are newly arrived immigrants to the United States and have a limited understanding of the English language. But for these students who are pursuing their high school diploma, there is the additional problem of not understanding the background knowledge of a core subject that they would have learned had they been in an American educational system in their early years. Such core subject areas could be, United States and World history, science, economics, mathematics, etc., which may have had a different focus, or even not taught at all in their home countries. LEAP school focuses on not only the teaching of English, but also at the same time teaching these core subjects in preparation for their high school diploma.

The present student population is approximately 65% Hmong, with the rest of the student representing the Somali, Latino, Liberian, Karen, Laotian, Sudanese, Oromo, Amhara, Filipino, Vietnamese, Latvian, Chinese, Romanian, Arab (United Arab Emirates) and other communities.
