= Steve Thayer =

American novelist

- Born: March 23, 1953 (age 73); Saint Paul, Minnesota, U.S.
- Occupation: Author
- Writing career
- Genre: Suspense
- Website: www.stevethayer.com

Steve Thayer (b. March 23, 1953 in Saint Paul, Minnesota) is a New York Times best-selling author of suspense novels.

== Biography ==
Thayer was born in Saint Paul, Minnesota and graduated from Harding Senior High School.

He graduated from the American Academy of Dramatic Arts in Pasadena, California, and worked as a screenwriter for several years. He moved to Edina, Minnesota in the 1980s, where he began writing novels, and now lives in St. Paul again.

He began writing suspense novels with Saint Mudd in 1988, and continued with a string of six more novels, mostly well received by critics. The topics of his work include criminal investigations, conspiracies, murder, and kidnapping. Thayer's writing has been described as "gritty" and "fast-paced." Publishing-industry turmoil led him to take a break from publishing after 2008's The Leper, until 2015's Ithaca Falls, which mixes Thayer's usual suspense elements with time travel and alternate history.

== Works ==
- Saint Mudd: A Novel of Gangsters and Saints (1988)
- The Weatherman (1995)
- Silent Snow (1999)
- Moon Over Lake Elmo (2001)
- The Wheat Field (2002)
- Wolf Pass (2003)
- The Leper (2008, North Star Press)
- Ithaca Falls (2015, Conquill Press)
