= George Brophy =

American baseball executive (1926–1998)

Brophy

George M. Brophy (September 15, 1926 – November 20, 1998) was an American professional baseball executive who served as farm system director for the Minnesota Twins of Major League Baseball for over 15 seasons.

A former sportswriter, Brophy was serving the general manager of the Class AAA Minneapolis Millers of the American Association when the club folded after the 1960 season due to the relocation of the then-Washington Senators to the Twin Cities as the Minnesota Twins. Brophy then joined the Twins as assistant director of farm clubs. After the death of Sherry Robertson, his boss, in 1970, Brophy was named to succeed him as Twins' vice president and farm director. Brophy stayed in this position until 1985, when he retired due to health problems and was succeeded by longtime deputy Jim Rantz. Following his retirement, Brophy served as a special assignment scout for the Houston Astros until 1996.

Brophy died in Edina, Minnesota, on November 20, 1998, at the age of 72 from complications stemming from aplastic anemia.

In 1984, he was named the Topps' Long Meritorious Service Award winner.

In 2009, Brophy was elected to the Twins' Hall of Fame.
