= T. D. Mischke =

American radio personality

T.D. Mischke
- Born: September 19, 1962 (age 64); Minnesota, United States
- Presenting career
- Show: The Nite Show
- Time slot: Monday to Thursday, 10:00- Midnight
- Stations: 830 WCCO, KSTP (AM) 1500
- Style: Talk, comedy, stream of consciousness
- Country: United States
- Previous shows: The Mischke Broadcast (1994–2008); In the Stream (2009–2010)

Thomas David Mischke (born September 19, 1962) is an American writer, musician, podcaster, and former radio talk show host on WCCO NewsRadio 830 based in Minneapolis. He was formerly employed as a weekly columnist at City Pages, a Twin Cities alternative news, arts and entertainment publication. For 17 years he hosted The Mischke Broadcast on am1500 KSTP. His show featured quirky regular callers, stream of consciousness humor, and experts on any topic he found interesting. Since 1998, Mischke has been the winner of the "Best AM Radio Personality" award given by the local weekly alternative newspaper City Pages nine times.

Mischke hosted a daily webcast entitled In the Stream for City Pages from March 2009 until February 2010. He was most recently the host of The Nite Show weekdays from 10 PM to Midnight on WCCO Radio. He decided to retire from radio in the summer of 2013. His final show on WCCO was August 1.

In May 2014 Mischke launched "The Mischke Roadshow." The monthly podcast features interviews, music and comedy bits.

In February 2025 Mischke announced he will be retiring The Mischke Roadshow and starting a new podcast for Hubbard Broadcasting.""The Mischke Roadshow: Episode 179 / That's All Folks"" (Podcast). Libsyn. February 1, 2025. Event occurs at 00:35.

== Early life ==
Mischke was born into a large Catholic family of six boys and two girls. He grew up in St. Paul's Macalester-Groveland neighborhood. After a stint at Cretin High School, he graduated from Highland Park Senior High.

== Broadcasting career ==
In 1986–1987, Mischke was known as "The Phantom Caller" on Don Vogel's show, where he would randomly call in (without identifying himself) with tightly-written, sixty-second comedic bits. He so amused the radio personality that he was invited to become Don's sidekick on his show, Afternoon Saloon, on KSTP in 1992, during Vogel's second stint in the Twin Cities. After the stint as a sidekick, Mischke was given his own program on am1500 in January 1994. A feature of his Friday night show was an hour called "Misfit Friday", where rules were relaxed and callers were free to contribute in creative ways, such as "The Singing Bandit", who would call and sing short songs he had written, and then immediately hang up. One staple of Misfit Friday was a regular caller who Tommy dubbed "Psycho Ray" (a.k.a. Raymond Armstrong). Psycho Ray often hinted at stalking Tommy, giving only vague inferences as to his activities; conversations about his hobbies included knife sharpening, gun cleaning, and hanging out with his auto mechanic girlfriend "Jodi". Eventually, Ray was banned from calling in to the show by KSTP management for "firing a gun" on the air (revealed later to be just firecrackers), which resulted in an immediate storm of calls ranging from urging caution to ignoring Ray for being "all talk".

On December 15, 2004, Mischke released Whistle Stop, a collection of his music. He performed on fellow Twin Cities broadcaster Garrison Keillor's A Prairie Home Companion on the September 2, 2006 show.

On January 3, 2006, the Mischke Broadcast returned from the Christmas hiatus to a new timeslot and an altered format. The new hours, a late drive-time shift of 5:30 p.m. to 7:30 p.m., Monday through Friday, prompted the new format, the station banning many of the trademark Mischke bits including his prank 411 calls and the pockets of dead air that would occasionally fill large portions of his show. Mischke, in announcing the change, said, "the Mischke Broadcast, as you know it, is finished," though he assured listeners the move was a positive one for both him and KSTP.

Mischke released his second CD, That Kind of Day, on December 4, 2008.

Mischke was abruptly fired by KSTP on December 5, 2008 for making a phone call on the air without first getting the recipient's permission, an FCC violation Mischke said he'd made before.

Mischke hosted a daily webcast for the weekly Twin Cities alternative newspaper City Pages. The show, entitled In the Stream, premiered on March 4, 2009. Mischke ended the webcast on February 4, 2010, but continued his weekly column for City Pages.

Mischke started a new radio show on May 10, 2010 10 pm–midnight, Mon–Thurs on WCCO 830 on the AM dial. On August 1, 2013, Mischke did his final radio show at WCCO.

Soon after, Mischke launched a new podcast entitled The Mischke Roadshow. In 2023 he told the Star Tribune:

"I created a road show, looking all over the United States for eccentrics and iconoclasts. Remember I said I was sort of a misfit? I wanted to find other misfits. People seeing life differently, living life differently. Having experiences wildly different than the average person."

In 2024, Mischke published his first book Winter's Song: A Hymn To The North, which was nominated for a 2024 Minnesota Book Award for Minnesota Nonfiction. Also in March 2024, the documentary The Phantom Caller of the Twin Cities by host/producer Kyle Shiely was published by KFAI.
