= College in the Schools =

College in the Schools (CIS) is an educational program for Minnesota high school students run by the University of Minnesota. It allows students to take college level classes in their high school and, as a result, earn college and high school credit free. The classes are taught by high school teachers who receive several weeks of additional training by the University of Minnesota. The curriculum is controlled by the University of Minnesota. More than 100 high schools in Minnesota participate in the program. Similar to programs such as Post Secondary Enrollment Options, the school district must pay for CIS programming for each student who enrolls in the program. Costs for College in the Schools are generally higher than alternative options offered by the Minnesota State System. Many schools who do not offer Advanced Placement or International Baccalaureate classes offer CIS.

== History ==
The program was started in the 1986–1987 school year, at the same time as several other school choice programs were started in Minnesota such as Post Secondary Enrollment Options and open enrollment. Initially only literature and composition courses were offered but now 31 introductory courses are offered which are sponsored by four University of Minnesota colleges: University of Minnesota College of Liberal Arts, University of Minnesota College of Food, Agricultural and Natural Resource Sciences, University of Minnesota College of Education and Human Development and University of Minnesota Institute of Technology.

== Program evaluation ==
Columbia University found that students who took dual enrollment courses in high school were more likely to graduate from high school and enroll in college, as well as three years after high school graduation, students who had participated in dual enrollment courses in high school had earned higher college GPAs and more postsecondary credits than their peers.

Research shows that colleges and universities nationwide accept dual enrollment credits at almost the same rate as they accept AP scores, though it greatly depends on the institution from which the credit originated from.

Once limited to high-achieving students, such programs, specifically College in the Schools, are increasingly seen as a means to support the postsecondary preparation of average-achieving students.

== Cost ==
There is no charge to high school students attending U of M courses offered by CIS at their high school. The University of Minnesota-TC charges schools or districts tuition based on a per student, per course basis (not per credit). For the 2010–2011 school year, tuition is $145 per student, per course, and partial reimbursement for these costs is available to public high schools from the state. College in the Schools is significantly less expensive than the full tuition rate the school district or parent pays when a student enrolls full-time PSEO or after graduation.

== Other states ==
=== Washington ===
College in the High School (CiHS or CHS) programs are offered by multiple public universities in the state of Washington. Central Washington University, Eastern Washington University, Western Washington University, and the University of Washington all offer college in the high school course partnerships with high schools, allowing students to take coursework on their high school campuses and receive college credit from one of the accredited universities alongside any high school course credits. Community and technical colleges, including Bellevue College and Everett Community College, also offer college in the high school programs.
