= Highland Park High School (Minnesota) =

Highland Park Senior High School

Location
- 1015 Snelling Avenue South; Saint Paul, Minnesota 55116; United States; 44°54′39″N 93°10′1″W

Information
- Type: Public
- Motto: Challenge, Envision, Achieve
- Established: 1964
- School district: Saint Paul Public Schools
- Superintendent: Dr. Stacie L. Stanley
- Principal: Dr. Winston Tucker
- Grades: 9–12
- Enrollment: ▼1,408 (2024–2025)
- Campus: Urban
- Colors: Red and White
- Athletics conference: Saint Paul City Conference
- Mascot: Scots
- Website: https://highlandsr.spps.org/

Highland Park Senior High School is a public secondary school in Saint Paul, Minnesota serving grades 9 through 12. It is in the Highland Park neighborhood.

The school offers the International Baccalaureate program. It is a national Blue Ribbon School. Newsweek ranked the school #973 on its "2005 List of the 1200 Top High Schools in America."

== Academics ==
The school has received grants from the Bush Foundation and Gates Foundation to develop the Small Learning Communities model. Motivated students in all three Communities may take International Baccalaureate courses.

=== Languages ===
Highland Park offers a number of foreign languages, including:

- Spanish, including the secondary component of Saint Paul Public Schools' Spanish immersion program.
- French
- Mandarin Chinese, including Chinese immersion program.
- Formerly American Sign Language; ASL was offered in the connecting Highland Park Junior High School, but the language does not continue into the high school, and the immersion program for deaf students was removed in 2008.

== Athletics ==
Highland Park has enjoyed moderate success in its athletic program. The boys basketball team qualified for the state championship several times in the 1970s before winning the class AAAA state championship in 1999. The girls basketball team made two state tournament runs in 1985 and 1986, finishing second in the 1986 class AA state championship.

As of 2007, Highland Park had also won two conference titles for football, six for girls basketball, eight in boys basketball, four for wrestling, including three in a row from 2005 to 2007, five for baseball and one for boys hockey. The school also boasted a soccer team that won the conference 4 straight years 2003-07. Tony Levine played wide receiver for the football team and was chosen for the Minnesota All-State team his senior year, in 1991. The Highland Park girls cross country and Nordic skiing teams have also won several championships, respectively.

The baseball team won the Saint Paul City Conference from 2011–13 (and held the second-longest winning streak in conference play in the state of Minnesota), 2014-15, 2018, and 2023-25.

== Campus ==
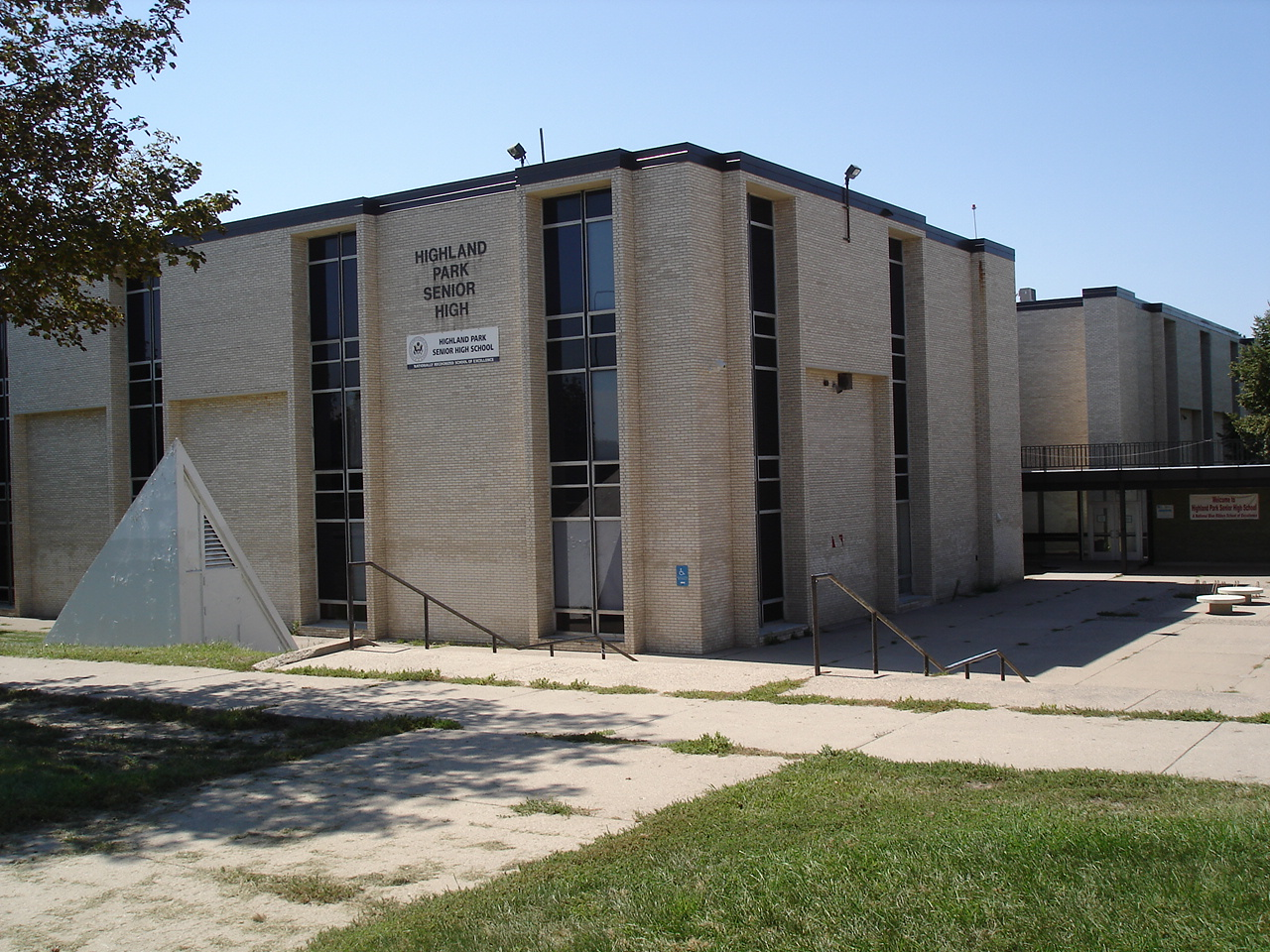
The Eastern side of Highland Park Senior High as seen from Snelling Avenue.

Highland is connected to Highland Park Middle School, a 1958 Miesian building.

Mattocks Schoolhouse is a historic landmark now used as part of Highland Park's facilities. The one-room limestone building, originally called Webster School Number 9, was built in 1871. The building became part of the Saint Paul Public Schools system in 1887 and was renamed at that time. For 30 years the building served as an American Legion post before being moved to its current location in 1964 after residing one mile north of the high school. The classroom has most recently been used for Spanish classes. Mattocks Schoolhouse is "essentially a Greek Revival building with some Italianate details." In 2025, the school underwent a major renovation, with the link between the Middle and High schools expanded to two stories and the cafeteria rebuilt.

== Demographics ==
As of the 2023–24 school year, the school's enrollment was 1,456. 36% of students were white, 22% African American, 12% Asian American, 23% Hispanic American, 7% multiracial, and 1% American Indian. In addition, 11% were English language learners, 8% were in Special Education programs, and 46% were eligible for the free and reduced lunch program. The student-to-teacher ratio was 24:1.

Enrollment profile	2023-24	2022-23	2021-22	2020-21	2019-20	2018-19	2017-18
White	36%	38%	36%	37%	36%	36%	38%
Black or African American	22%	21%	22%	23%	22%	23%	22%
Asian	12%	11%	13%	14%	15%	15%	17%
Hispanic or Latino	23%	23%	22%	22%	23%	23%	23%
American Indian	1%	<1%	<1%	1%	1%	1%	1%
Native Hawaiian or Pacific Islander	<1%	<1%	<1%	-	-	-	-
Multiracial	7%	6%	7%	4%	4%	3%	2%

== Notable alumni ==
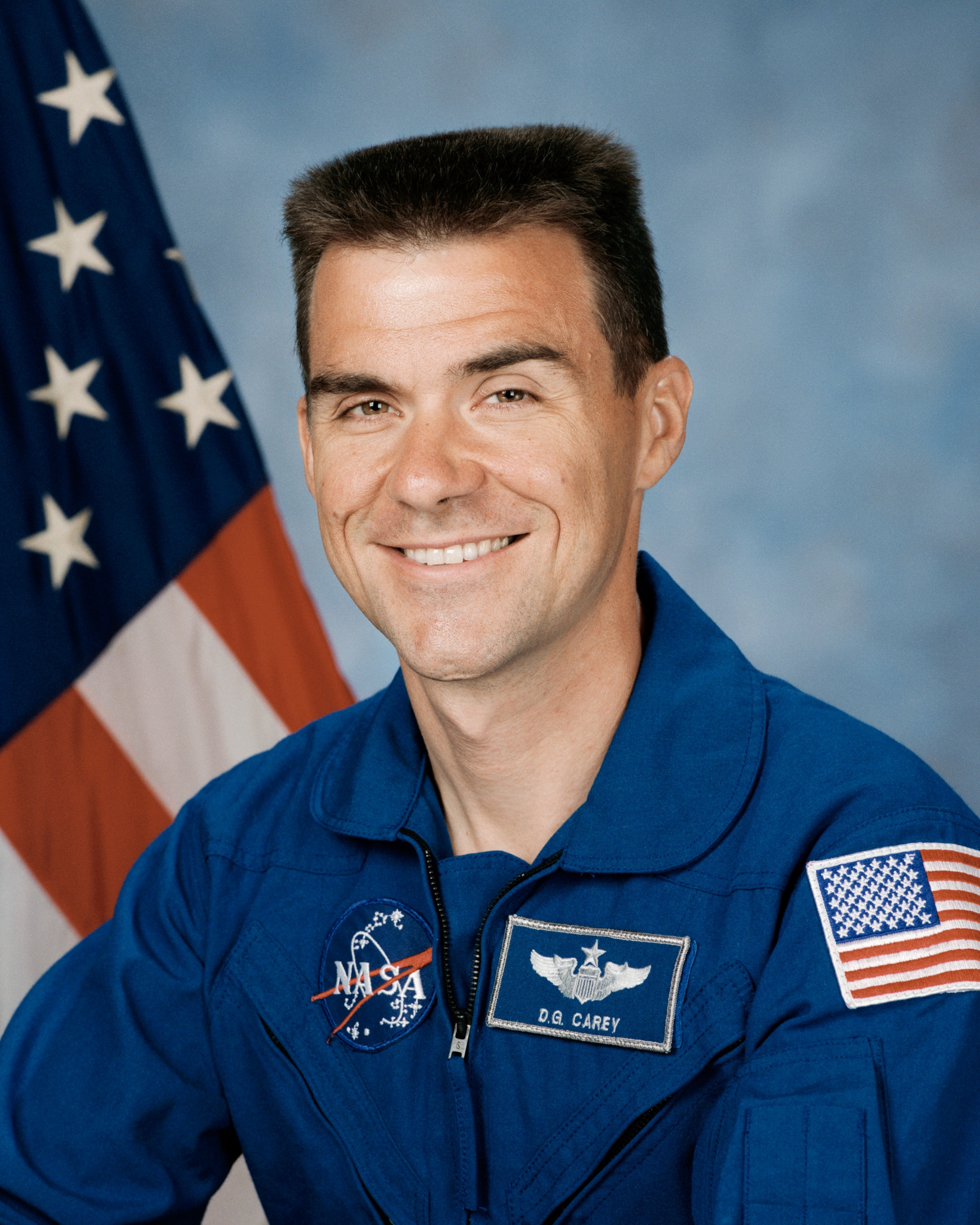
Duane Carey

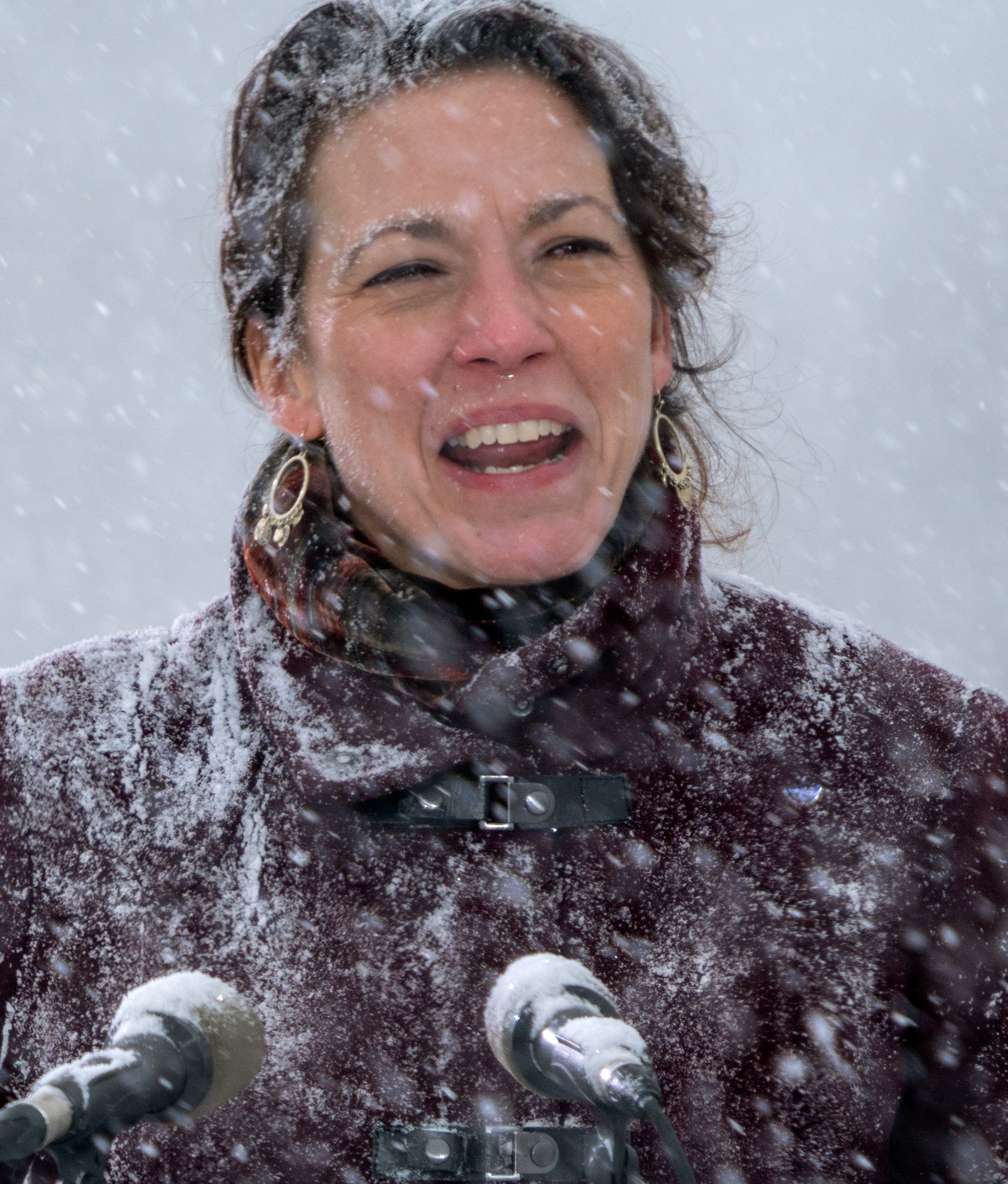
Emily Larson

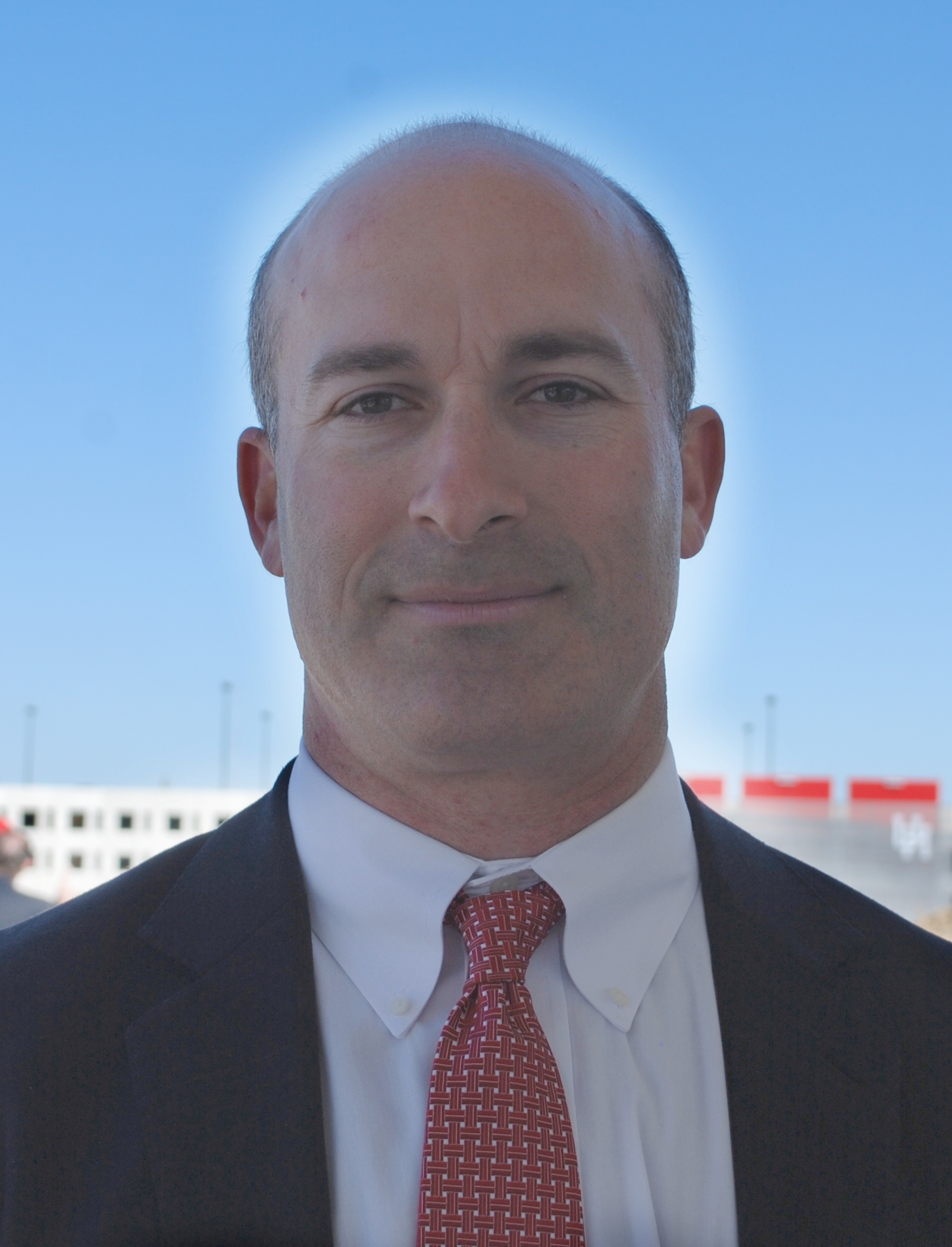
Tony Levine

- Duane G. Carey, astronaut (1975)
- Dick Cohen, Minnesota state senator (DFL) (1967)
- Eyedea, born Micheal Larsen, rapper (1999)
- Debbie Friedman, singer/songwriter (1969)
- Aaron Gleeman, Minnesota Twins beat reporter for The Athletic (2001)
- Steven Greenberg, musician and record producer (1968)
- Earl Grinols, Baylor University Distinguished Professor of Economics (1969)
- Emily Larson, former mayor of Duluth, Minnesota (1991)
- Tony Levine, former head coach of the Houston Cougars football team (1991)
- T. D. Mischke, radio personality (1980)
- Jack Morris, Hall of Fame Major League Baseball pitcher (1973)
