= Saint Paul College =

Community college in Saint Paul, Minnesota, U.S.

- Type: Public community college
- Established: 1910
- Parent institution: Minnesota State Colleges and Universities System
- Accreditation: HLC
- Chancellor: Scott Olson
- President: Deidra Peaslee
- Students: 11,243 (2023)
- Location: St. Paul, Minnesota, United States; 44°56′56″N 93°6′35″W
- Campus: Urban
- Colors: Midnight Blue and Sky Blue
- Website: www.saintpaul.edu

Saint Paul College is an open-access public community college in Saint Paul, Minnesota. It is part of the Minnesota State Colleges and Universities System. The college enrolls about 11,000 students in the Minneapolis-Saint Paul metropolitan area and employs 126 full-time faculty, 116 part-time faculty, 233 staff members, and 18 administrative members.

== History ==
Saint Paul College was founded in 1910 as a boys' vocational high school. The first evening trade classes were held in the basement of Saint Paul Central High School. In 1966, the college moved into its current facility and became Saint Paul Technical Vocational Institute, or Saint Paul TVI. In 2002, the college added liberal arts to its curriculum and changed its name to Saint Paul College – A Community & Technical College.

Saint Paul College was home to the nation's oldest watchmaking and clockmaking programs. In its last few years, it was awarded a grant from Rolex and started offering the WOSTEP certificate, an industry wide accepted certification for watchmaking excellence.

In 2019, the college briefly gained national attention when a site visit team of the college's accreditor, the Higher Learning Commission (HLC), documented several reports by faculty members alleging that the college president, Rassoul Dastmozd, had a leadership style "grounded in fear and intimidation". Shortly thereafter, Dastmozd announced that he would resign on June 30.

In March 2021, Deidra Peaslee was named president, becoming the college's first female president. A few months later, HLC removed the institution from probation and assigned interim monitoring after determining that the college was in compliance with its accreditation criteria.

== Academics ==
Saint Paul College offers more than 100 degree, certificate, and diploma programs in career and transfer education.

== Campus ==
Saint Paul College is in the Cathedral Hill neighborhood near downtown St. Paul. Its campus is 520,968 square feet with one building. In 2017, the college opened an addition, the Saint Paul College Health and Science Alliance Center, which is the primary space for the college’s STEM and health career programs.
