= G. Edward Larson =

American soldier (1920–1994)

Godfrey Edward Larson (1920–17 August 1994) was a low level advisor in the United States government during the Eisenhower administration.

He was born in St. Paul, Minnesota and graduated from Johnson High School. He married Elizabeth Glauner, a native of St. Paul, Minnesota, in 1942. He joined the Army at the start of World War II and was assigned to the Transportation Corps. He attended Officer’s Candidate School in Louisiana during the summer of 1943 and became a lieutenant. In 1944 and 1945 he served as a port officer at Cherbourg, France.

After the war Larson returned to Minnesota where he joined the staff of former governor Harold Stassen. Larson served as Harold Stassen’s aide from 1947 to 1958. He assisted Stassen at the University of Pennsylvania when Stassen became President of the University. Larson attended the University of Pennsylvania at that time. He accompanied Stassen to Washington, D.C. in 1953 when Stassen became head of the Foreign Operations Administration during President Eisenhower's term, and also served on Stassen’s staff at the White House when Stassen was Special Assistant to the President for Disarmament. When Stassen left government service in 1958 Larson transferred to the Department of the Interior. He served as special assistant to Under Secretary Elmer Bennett, and helped prepare Bennett’s speeches. At the end of the Eisenhower administration Larson transferred to the Office of Coal Research in the U.S. Department of the Interior where he worked until 1975.

Following his departure from the Department of the Interior, Larson became a consultant until his retirement in 1992.
