= Saint Paul Public Schools =

Public school district in Saint Paul, Minnesota, US

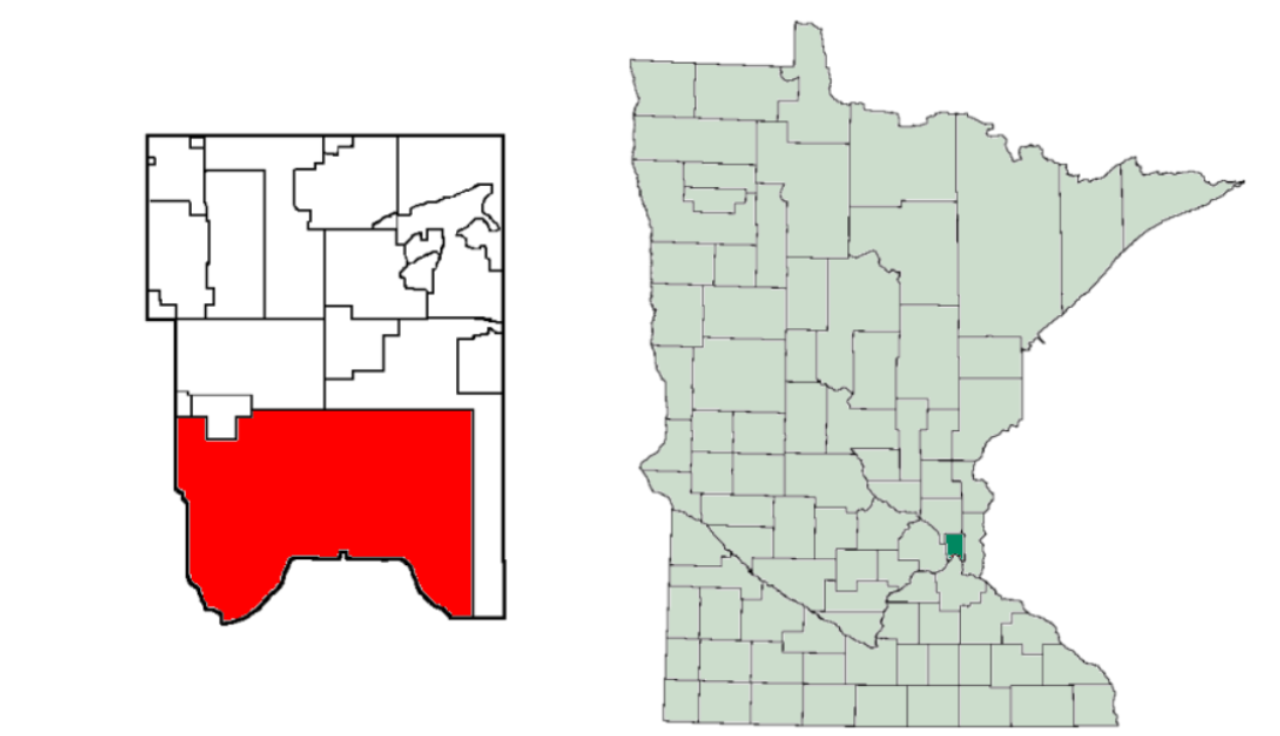
- Location of Saint Paul within Minnesota

Location
- Saint Paul, Minnesota Minnesota United States

District information
- Type: Public
- Motto: A World of Opportunities
- Grades: PreK-12
- Established: 1856
- Superintendent: Dr. Stacie L. Stanley; Since May 12, 2025
- Budget: $1.037 billion (2025)

Students and staff
- Students: ▲33,469 (2024-2025)
- Staff: 6,000+
- Athletic conference: Saint Paul City Conference

Other information
- Website: www.spps.org

Saint Paul Public Schools 625 (SPPS) is a school district that operates in Saint Paul, Minnesota.

Saint Paul Public Schools is Minnesota's second largest school district, after Anoka-Hennepin School District 11, and serves approximately 33,000 students. The district runs 68 different schools and employs more than 6,000 teachers and staff. The entire school district participates in the University of Minnesota's College in the Schools (CIS) program.

Saint Paul Public Schools oversees community education programs for pre-K and adult learners. The Community Education program includes classes and services such as Early Childhood Family Education, GED Diploma, language programs, and various other learning programs for community members of any age.

In 1993, Saint Paul became the first city in the U.S. to sponsor and open a charter school, now found in most states across the nation. Saint Paul is currently home to 21 charter schools.

Saint Paul Public Schools celebrated its 150th anniversary in 2006. Notable graduates of Saint Paul Public Schools include former U.S. Supreme Court justices Harry Blackmun and Warren Burger, civil rights leader Roy Wilkins, creator of the Peanuts cartoon strip Charles M. Schulz, and many others from various professions and among notable achievements.

On February 15, 2024, then-Superintendent Dr. Joe Gothard was named 2024 National Superintendent of the Year by the American Association of School Administrators.

== History of Saint Paul Public Schools ==
In 1856, a small group of citizens decided that it was of vital importance to establish a school district in Saint Paul. They did this as they believed "good schools would provide good settlers". Nine years previously, Harriet Bishop moved to the then small but growing city of Saint Paul. She was part of a program led by educational reformer Catharine Beecher that was designed to help educate frontier children. As part of the program, she volunteered to teach the children of Saint Paul. Harriet Bishop is credited with starting the first public school in the Saint Paul Public Schools district.

In 1870, two students by the names of Fannie Hayes and A. P. Warren became the first two students to graduate from Saint Paul High School. Nine years later in 1879, Saint Paul High School was renamed to Central High School. Grover Cleveland High School was established in 1897; it was renamed Johnson Senior High School in 1911. By 1906, the Saint Paul Public Schools district had around 27,940 students attending it. Eight years later in 1914, the Saint Paul city government took control of all educational matters. However, after 36 years of government control and extensive protesting from citizens, the Saint Paul Public Schools Board of Education was reinstated in 1950.

In 1954, the US Supreme Court ruled that public education between minorities and the majority could not be equal if it remained "separated". A decade later in 1964, the Saint Paul Public Schools district addressed the issue of racial injustice and started developing solutions so that students would have equal access to education.

On February 28, 2004, over 6,000 students, parents, and school staff rallied at the Capitol for the government to support more education funding.

== Demographics ==
The district has students from families speaking 115+ different languages, although only five languages are used for most school communication. Those languages are English, Spanish, Hmong, Somali, and Karen. 78% of students are students of color. 70% of the district's students qualify for free or reduced lunch, 19% of students are considered Special Education and 28% of students are ELL (English Language Learners). The school district currently receives $53.8 million a year in desegregation funding from the state. However, because of two United States Supreme Court cases, schools are no longer allowed to assign students to schools based on race.

In 2001, the district had 46,000 students. Around one-third of them were Hmong. At the time, about 13,000 of the Hmong students received English as a second language (ESL) services. In 2002, of all of the American school districts, Saint Paul had the largest Hmong student population.

== Governing body ==

The governing body of the school district is the seven-member Board of Education. The Board of Education then appoints a Superintendent who is responsible for the general supervision of the school district.

The Board of Education is elected during Saint Paul's general municipal elections. Board members are elected every two years in odd-numbered years and serve staggered four-year terms. The school board elections are technically nonpartisan, however most candidates seek and advertise party endorsements.

The current superintendent is Dr. Stacie L. Stanley, who began her tenure on May 12, 2025, succeeding interim superintendent Dr. John Thein. The current Board of Education members are:

- Halla Henderson (Chair)
- Uriah Ward (Vice Chair)
- Erica Valliant (Clerk)
- Yusef Carrillo (Treasurer)
- Chauntyll Allen (Director) - Allen was arrested on January 22, 2026 by Homeland Security and FBI agents for participating in the protest at Cities Church in St. Paul, Minnesota.
- Carlo Franco (Director)
- Jim Vue (Director)

== Elementary Schools (PreK-5) ==
- Adams Spanish Immersion
- American Indian Magnet
- Barack and Michelle Obama School (currently on renovations and remodeling) K-8
- Battle Creek Elementary
- Benjamin E. Mays IB World School
- Bruce Vento Elementary
- Capitol Hill Gifted and Talented Magnet
- Chelsea Heights Elementary
- Cherokee Heights Elementary
- Como Park Elementary
- Crossroads Montessori
- Crossroads Science
- Dayton's Bluff Achievement Plus
- Early Childhood Hubs (formerly Galtier Elementary)
- East African Elementary Magnet (formerly Jackson Elementary)
- Eastern Heights Elementary
- EXPO Elementary
- Farnsworth Aerospace Magnet
- Four Seasons Arts+
- Frost Lake Elementary
- Global Arts Plus - Lower Campus
- Groveland Park Elementary
- Hamline Elementary
- Hazel Park Prep Academy (formerly Ames Elementary)
- The Heights Community School
- Highland Park Elementary
- Highwood Hills Elementary
- Horace Mann School
- Jie Ming Mandarin Immersion
- L' Etoile du Nord French Immersion
- Maxfield Magnet School
- Mississippi Creative Arts
- Nokomis Montessori Magnet (North and South)
- Randolph Heights Elementary
- Riverview Spanish/English Dual Immersion Program
- Saint Paul Music Academy
- SPPS Online School
- St. Anthony Park Elementary
- Txuj Ci HMong Language & Culture - Lower Campus
- Wellstone Elementary

== Middle Schools (6-8) ==
- American Indian Magnet
- Battle Creek Middle School
- Capitol Hill Gifted and Talented Magnet
- Creative Arts Secondary
- E-STEM Middle School
- Farnsworth Aerospace - Upper Campus
- Global Arts Plus Upper Campus
- Hazel Park Preparatory Academy
- Hidden River Middle School (formerly Ramsey Middle School)
- Highland Park Middle School
- Humboldt High School (6-12)
- Murray Middle School
- Open World Learning Community (6-12)
- SPPS Online School
- Txuj Ci HMong Language and Culture - Upper (formerly Parkway Middle)
- Washington Technology Magnet Middle School

== High schools (9-12) ==
- Central Senior High
- Como Senior High
- Creative Arts Secondary
- Harding Senior High
- Highland Park Senior High
- Humboldt High School
- Johnson Senior High
- Open World Learning Community
- Washington Technology High School (6-12) (merged with Arlington Senior High School after the 2010-2011 school year)

== Non-Traditional High Schools (9-12) ==
- AGAPE High School
- Evening High School
- Gateway to College
- Gordon Parks High School
- Guadalupe Alternative Programs
- Journeys Secondary
- LEAP High School (formerly International Academy - LEAP)

== Care & Treatment Programs ==
- Downtown School
- Saint Paul School East - Brittany's Place
- Saint Paul School West - Emily’s Program
- Saint Paul School North - Gillette Children’s Hospital
- Saint Paul School South - United Hospital's Adolescent In-Patient / Day Treatment

== Special Education Sites ==
- Bridge View School
- Focus Beyond Transition Services
- RiverEast Elementary and Secondary

== See also ==
- List of school districts in Minnesota
- Saint Paul Public Schools' Official Website
