= Harding Senior High School (Saint Paul, Minnesota) =

Location
- 1540 East 6th Street; Saint Paul, Minnesota; United States; 44°57′33″N 93°2′12″W

Information
- Type: Public school
- Motto: "A place to call home"
- Established: 1926
- Principal: Tony Chlebecek
- Teaching staff: 77.96 (FTE)
- Grades: 9–12
- Enrollment: 1,591 (2024-2025)
- Student to teacher ratio: 20.41
- Campus: urban
- Colors: Maroon and Gold
- Mascot: Knights
- Yearbook: SAGA
- Website: harding.spps.org

Harding Senior High School is a public comprehensive high school located on the East Side of Saint Paul, Minnesota, United States. The school is one of the nine high schools in the Saint Paul Public School District and is the largest high school in the city of Saint Paul, with enrollment at approximately 1,908. The school was opened in 1926 as the second high school on the East Side, after Johnson Senior High School. Harding is part of the IB Diploma Programme. Harding is a member of the Minnesota State High School League and the athletic teams compete in the Saint Paul City Conference.

== Education ==
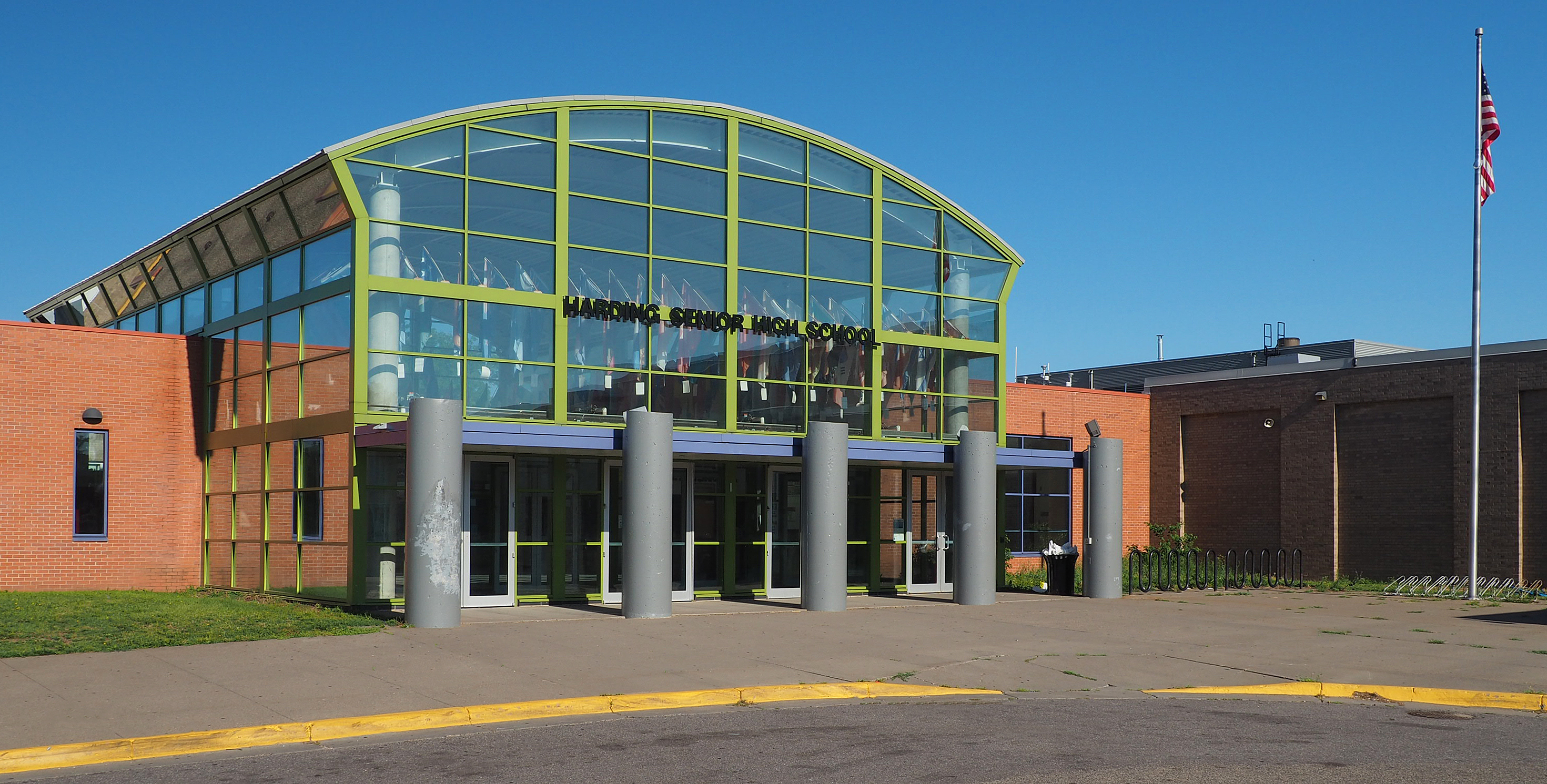
Harding Senior High School's Third Street entrance

Harding Senior High School was one of several schools participating in smaller learning communities. In a somewhat similar fashion to specific colleges within the University of Minnesota, smaller learning communities were implemented in the 2002–2003 school year to group students that had similar interests together for a career. Freshmen were automatically placed in the 9th Grade Academy, and the following year, select to be in the Academy of Fine Arts, the Medical and Environmental Sciences Academy (MESA), the Human Services Academy, or the Science, Engineering, & Information Technology Academy (SEIT). However, the Academies have been facing difficulties with the large student body and change has been slow. While academic performance has improved over the past few years, there was not enough data to associate the increase with smaller learning communities. There was a limit of 500 students per academy, which presented a dilemma with the Academy of Fine Arts who have had to reject a number of students. A possible cause is the large base of students involved in some form of fine arts. Another challenge is scheduling students to just their academy teachers.

In 2009 the music listening team made up of Matt Howard, Maivboon Vang, and Colton Moyer, took home a second-place finish at the state competition, this was after placing first in sections. The previous year Matt Howard, Connie Sinks, and Colton Moyer, took second in sections and advanced to state. The state placing team of 2009 was featured in the Star Tribune.

One student from the class of 2006 was the recipient of the Gates Millennium Scholarship, five Harding alumni were named KARE-11 Academic All-Stars and one received a WCCO-TV outstanding graduate award.

== Athletics ==
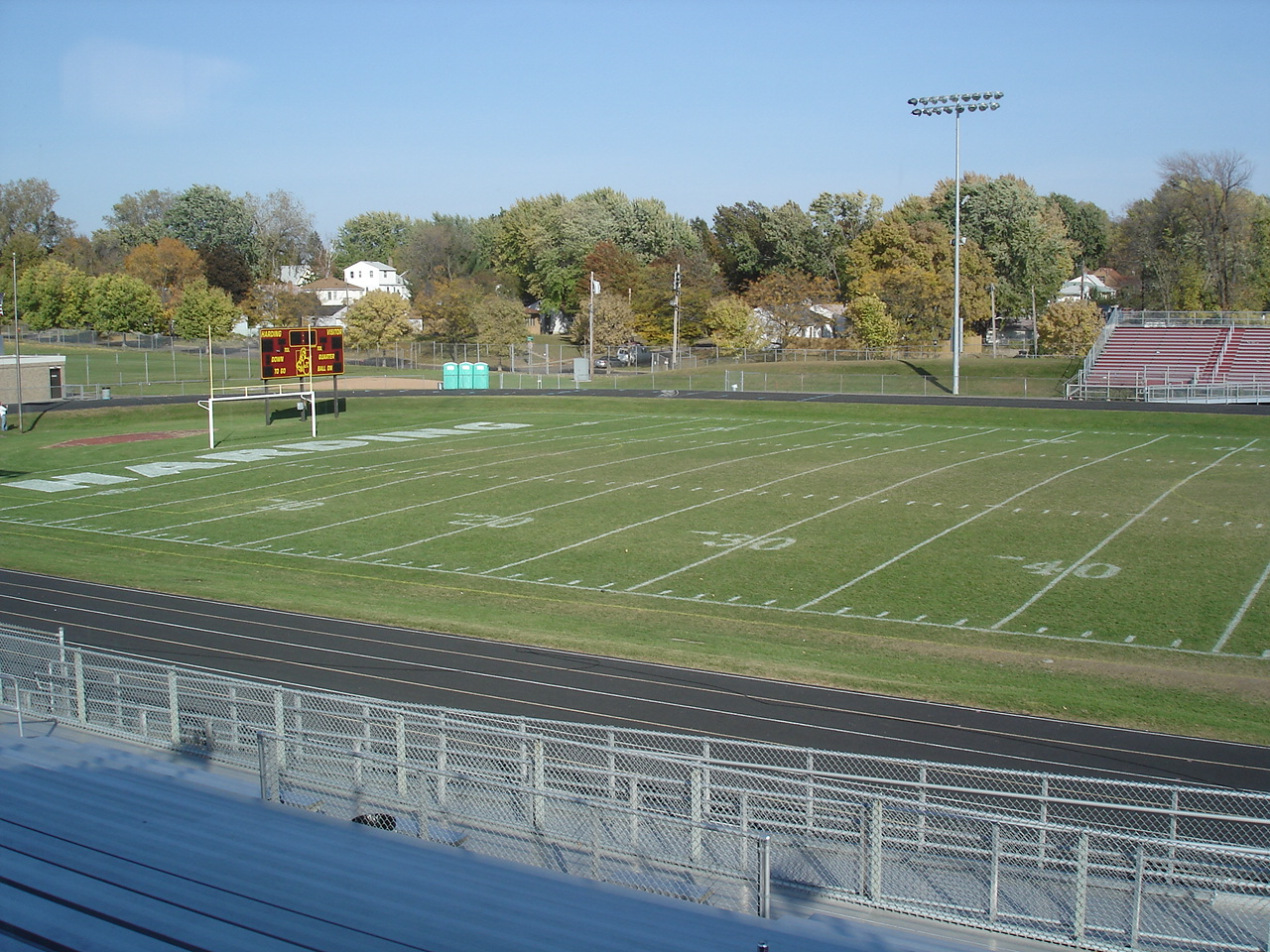
View of Bakken Field, used by the Harding football, soccer, and track teams.

Harding's athletic program offers several sports. The girls badminton team have dominated the sport in the decade of 2000–2009, winning eight state titles (2000, 2002–2004, 2006–2009) in ten years and becoming the first school to win four consecutive team titles. No other Harding sport has won a state title.

In the spring of 2005, freshman Sade Pollard won state titles in the 100-meter and 200-meter dashes. In 2006, she swept all of the sprinting events, taking home state titles in the 100m, 200m and 400m runs. She was the only competitor from Harding to participate in the state meet that year, but scored enough points to give Harding a third-place finish in the state tournament. Pollard won the 200m and 400m dashes again in the 2007 state meet.

In the spring of 2002, Sheila Emms broke the Minnesota single season record for strikeouts as a high school fastpitch softball pitcher. During her final season as a Harding Knight she struck out a staggering 353 batters and pitched seven perfect games. Following her high school career she was offered a full tuition scholarship to pitch for Illinois State University.

All sports are offered for both boys and girls, with exceptions for football, gymnastics, volleyball, wrestling and badminton. Other sports include soccer, tennis, swimming, cross-country, baseball/softball, Nordic skiing, basketball, hockey and golf.

Its chief rival is Johnson Senior High School, also located on the east side of Saint Paul. Both football teams have an annual regular-season game where they play for the Hatchet trophy.

A number of student athletes have, after graduating, found success in collegiate sports (See notable alumni section).

== Fatal stabbing of student in 2023 ==
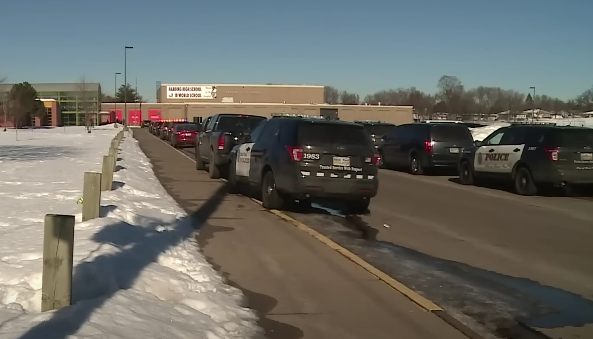
Large police presence outside of Harding's 3rd St entrance following the homicide.

On Friday, February 10, 2023, a student was fatally stabbed inside of Harding Senior High School. 15-year-old Devin Denelle Edward Scott was stabbed in the chest and abdomen by 16-year-old Nosakhere Kazeem Holmes following a fight between the two in a school hallway. Police were called to the school at 11:45 a.m where school staff were giving first aid to Scott until the arrival of medical professionals. He was transported to Regions Hospital where he was later pronounced dead. Holmes was charged with second-degree unintentional murder in Ramsey Country District Court and plans have indicated to move the case to an adult court. This incident was the first homicide of 2023 for the City of Saint Paul.

== Miscellaneous ==
Upon the death of comedian Mitch Hedberg, students ran several pictures of him in student of the month columns for various academies along with the inscription "Mitch Hedberg, R.I.P. 1968-2005," to honor him. Hedberg graduated from Harding in 1986.

== Notable alumni ==
- Ken Dahlberg, class of 1935, WWII fighter ace, businessman
- Mitch Hedberg, stand-up comedian
- Paul Holmgren, former NHL player who spent his career with the Philadelphia Flyers and Minnesota North Stars
- Randy Kelly, Mayor of Saint Paul from 2002-2006
- Ken Mauer, NBA referee
- Jason Litzau, professional boxer
- Dave Peterson (1931–1997), teacher and coach of the United States men's national ice hockey team
- Brett Rogers, football and basketball player; professional mixed martial arts fighter
- Steve Thayer, author
- Kao Kalia Yang, author
