= Post Secondary Enrollment Options =

Academic option in some US states to take college level classes in high schools

Post Secondary Enrollment Options (PSEO) is an academic option open to high school seniors, juniors and sophomores in various US states, such as Minnesota, Ohio, Washington and Florida. The options allow students to take courses at the college level. It is possible for a student to graduate with both an associate's degree and a high school diploma at the same time via PSEO. The PSEO program was created in 1985 in Minnesota, and later adopted by Ohio's Department of Education. PSEO enables 10th, 11th, and 12th grade students to complete high school graduation requirements while earning credit at a given college, or university.

== Minnesota ==
In Minnesota, tuition, books and fees are free for PSEO students. Qualifying high school juniors and seniors are allowed to participate in PSEO Courses full or part time. Tenth graders may take one career-technical PSEO course. If they earn at least a "C", they make additional career-technical courses. High school juniors and seniors may take career and technical as well as academic courses.

Admissions requirements for PSEO students vary among institutions. The Finishing Trade Institute, created by a group of businesspeople and unions, has no admissions requirements beyond an interest in learning about finishing trades, like glazing and a willingness to attend regularly.

The Minnesota State Colleges and Universities system requires tenth graders to pass the state's required 8th grade math test or an equivalent test, as well as to pass the Accuplacer test that the system uses. The Minnesota state system also generally requires juniors to be in the top one-third of their class to be in PSEO or to "score at or above the 70th percentile on a nationally standardized, norm-referenced test." Seniors are required to be in the top half of their class, or to "score at or above the 50th percentile on a nationally standardized, norm-referenced test; or for juniors or seniors, documentation other than that specified in Part 2, Subpart A1 and Subpart A2 of this procedure of the student's readiness and ability to perform college-level work as determined by the college or university." For 10th graders, the Minnesota State system requires that a student "has attained a passing score on the 8th grade Minnesota Comprehensive Assessment in reading and meets any the other course prerequisites or course enrollment standards established by the college, including but not limited to assessment test scores, program admission, or other requirements,

Minnesota also has established an "Early College/Middle High School" program allowing students who need additional support to participate in PSEO programs. These programs involve a partnership between a school district and a Minnesota State public two year college. They are open to students who do not meet requirements described above. Postsecondary institutions are not allowed to charge PSEO students for tuition, textbooks or support services.

In 2004 over 17,000 Minnesota High School students took PSEO classes.

Eligible Courses and Institutions Once a student has been accepted into PSEO they must take courses that meet their highschool graduation requirement. Postsecondary institutions are required to allow students to enroll in online PSEO courses that are consistent with Online Course Policy.

Transposition funds are available for students/family who are at or below poverty level. There is mileage reimbursement for low income students.

== Ohio ==
In Ohio, PSEO was actually known as PSEOP, for Post Secondary Enrollment Options Program. It was enacted in 1989 for 11th and 12th graders. Then, in 1997, the grades were expanded to include 9th and 10th graders. Because of this, the number of students in the PSEOP almost quadrupled in size, with over 12,000 students attending in 2008. It was replaced by College Credit Plus in the 2015–16 school year. Ohio's is similar to PSEO as it allows students in grades 7-12 to take college classes for which they receive both college and high school credits. The program has no cost associated with tuition or books but transportation may need to be arranged. The purpose of this program is to help students become college ready and gain access to college level classes.

== Activism ==
People for PSEO is a non-profit organization created in 2018 that advocates for the PSEO program in Minnesota. The organization arose after PSEO students in Minnesota reported discrimination from various high schools due to their statuses as PSEO students. Since its founding, the student-led organization has assisted in creating new legislation for the program and works to spread knowledge about the program to communities across the state. In many school districts, PSEO students were denied access to school resources, events, and clubs. Additionally, students endured unequal grade weighting policies, which gave more weight to classes on high school campuses, despite being equal in content. While there has been legislative reform to correct some of these issues, bias against PSEO students by their school districts still continues. People for PSEO continues to advocate for more equitable treatment of current PSEO students, as well as expansion of the program to reach more high school students.
