= Como Park Senior High School =

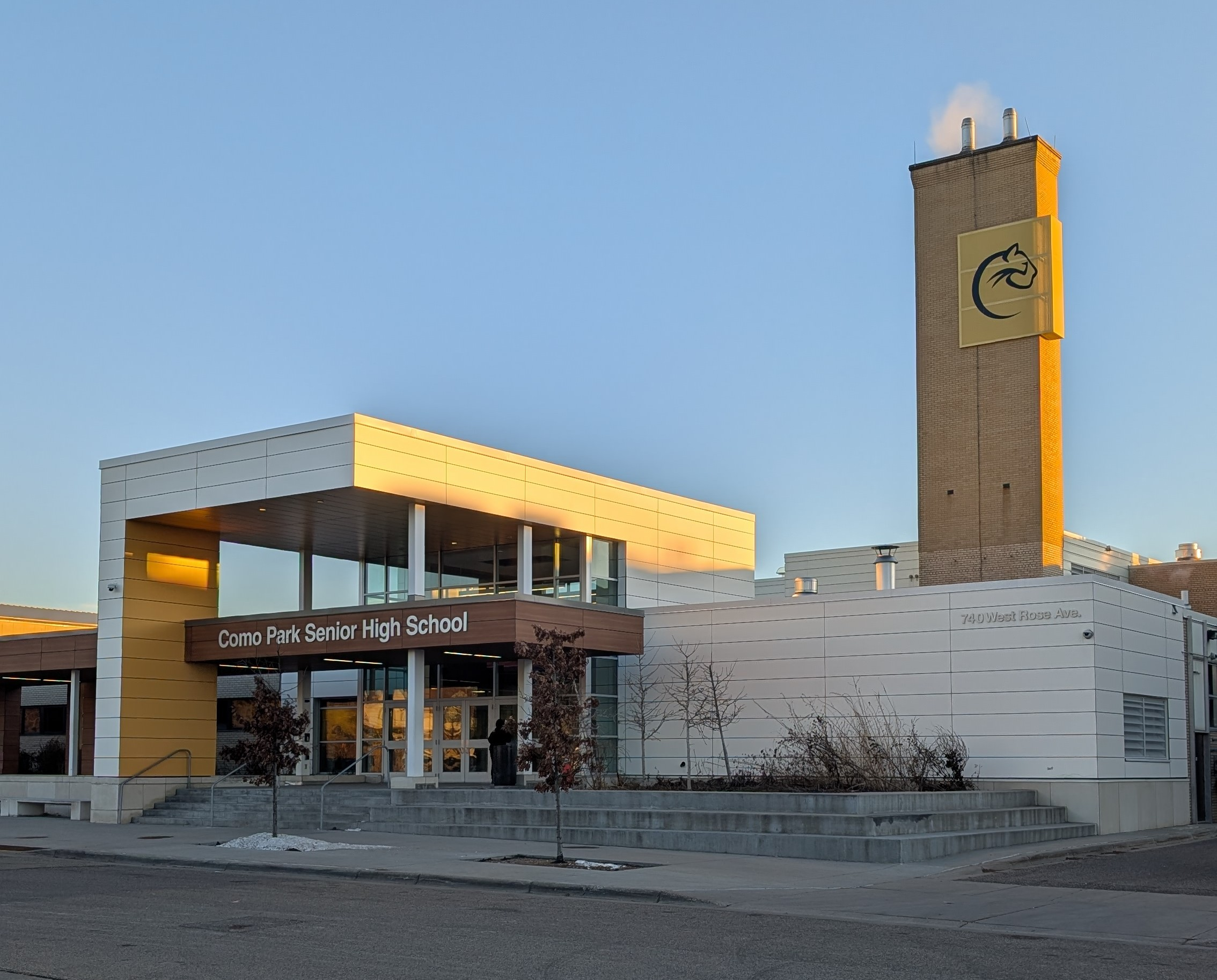

Location
- 740 Rose Ave W Saint Paul, Minnesota 55117; United States; 44°58′33″N 93°7′52″W

Information
- Type: Public
- Established: 1979
- Principal: Diana Brown
- Teaching staff: 55.11 (FTE)
- Grades: 9-12
- Enrollment: 1,074 (2023-2024)
- Student to teacher ratio: 19.49
- Colors: Black and Gold
- Mascot: Cougar
- Website: comosr.spps.org

Como Park Senior High School (commonly known as CPSHS or CPHS) is a public high school in the Lake Como area of Saint Paul, Minnesota, United States, serving grades 9 through 12. Along with nine other public high schools, Como Park comprises the Saint Paul Public Schools. Newsweek ranked the school on its List of the Top High Schools in America in 2006, 2007, 2009, and 2010.

== History ==
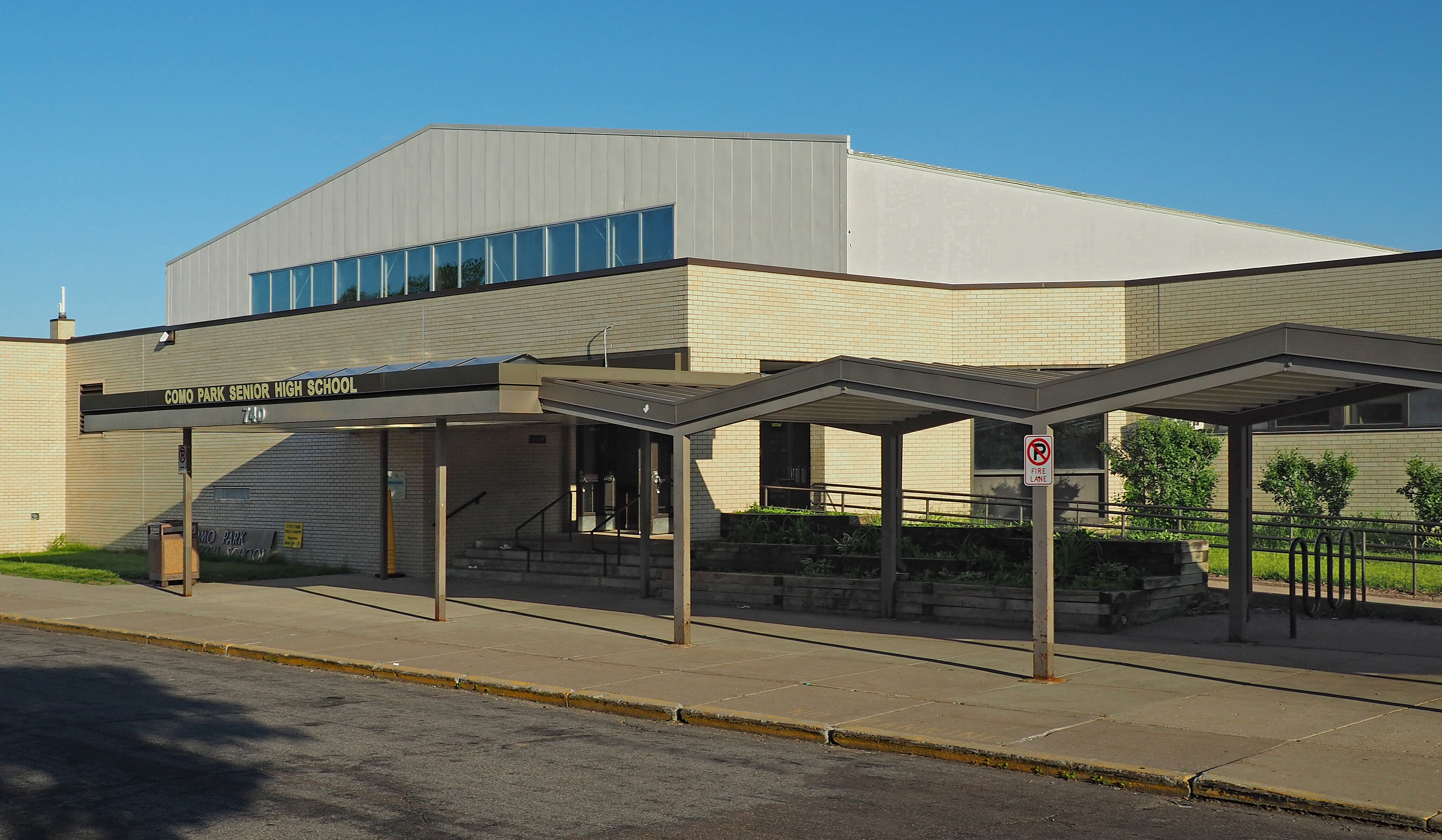
Como Park Senior High School opened its doors for classes in 1979 and remained the youngest high school in the district until Arlington Senior High opened in 1997.

After opening in 1957, Como Park Junior High School was converted into a senior high school in 1979, accepting students from the just closed Washington and Murray High Schools, both of which became junior highs that same year. The school originally had only three classes—sophomores, juniors, and seniors. The freshman class was added in 1981. Construction was not completed when the school year began. The class of 1985 was the first four-year graduating class.

=== Renovation ===
In 2016, a school design committee drafted plans to renovate CPHS, including redoing artificial turf on the sports field, a building addition and interior renovations to create capacity for 100 new students through new education spaces, and a two-story addition to the building. Construction of these additions broke ground in 2017. The returfing of the field was completed that year and the other projects were completed in 2020.

== Education ==
Como Park's average score on the ACT exam was 21.2 compared to a state average of 22.6 and a national average of 21.1. 51.56% of students were considered proficient in reading while 22.08% were proficient in math. The school meets 83.9% of the Adequate Yearly Progress (AYP) requirements, not meeting AYP in mathematics. Como Park has an AYP graduation rate of 96%.

Through Minnesota's Post Secondary Enrollment Options (PSEO) program, students may take classes at state colleges and universities.

== Enrollment ==
Como Park enrolled 1,163 students in the 2020–21 school year. Of them, those identifying as African American and Asian were 33% each, while 20% identified as Caucasian and 10% as Hispanic. American Indian students were 1%, and 3% identified as two or more ethnicities. 62% qualified for Free and Reduced Price Lunch, a measure of poverty. 37% were enrolled in English Language Learning, and 13% in special education.

== Athletics ==
Cougar athletic programs compete in Class 4AA of the Minnesota State High School League.

=== Fall sports ===
- Boys': Cross-Country, Football, Soccer
- Girls': Cross-Country, Soccer, Swimming & Diving, Tennis, Volleyball

=== Winter sports ===
- Boys': Basketball, Hockey, Nordic Skiing, Swimming & Diving, Wrestling
- Girls': Alpine Skiing, Basketball, Gymnastics, Hockey, Nordic Skiing

=== Spring sports ===
- Boys': Baseball, Golf, Tennis, Track & Field, Ultimate
- Girls': Badminton, Golf, Softball, Track & Field, Ultimate

=== State championships ===
In 2013, Como Park's boys soccer team won the class A state title in a 2–1 victory against Hill-Murray, earning their first state championship title.

In 2025, the Cougars Cross Country team won the class AA state championship under head coach Tim Kersey.

== Extracurricular activities ==
=== Robotics ===
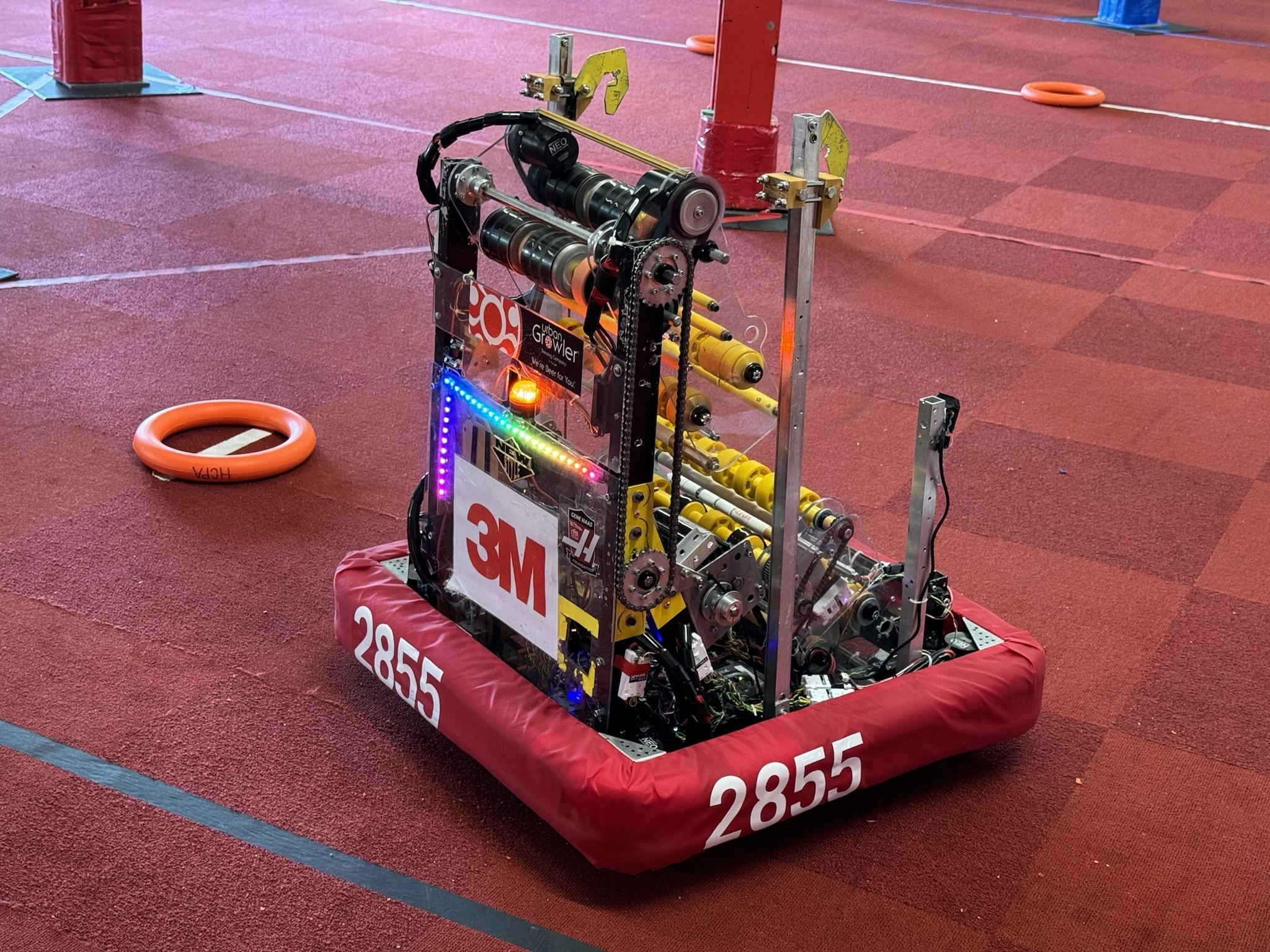
Team 2855s robot, "The New Style", for the 2024 season

Como Park's robotics team, BEASTBOT#2855, has competed in the FIRST Robotics Competition since 2009. From its founding until 2019, the team competed in the Minnesota 10,000 lakes regional, Minnesota State High School League State Championships, Minnesota Robotics Invitational, Lake Superior Regional and the Minnesota North Star Regional. In 2016, It won the Minnesota 10,000 Lakes Regional Entrepreneurship Award and came in first at the Minnesota Robotics Invitational as the backup robot. Due to lack of coaches, the COVID-19 pandemic and subsequent distance learning, the team stopped operating in 2020, but came back to compete in the 2023 Minnesota 10,000 lakes regional, where it won the Team Spirit Award. In 2024, the team made it to the third match of semifinals, the best result in its history.

== Notable alumni ==
- Lexii Alijai, rapper
- Josh Blue, stand-up comedian, winner of Last Comic Standing
- Andre Smith, former basketball power forward for North Dakota State University
- Jay Xiong, politician
