= Kairos Alive! =

Non-profit arts organisation

Kairos Alive! is a 501(c)3 non-profit performing arts and arts learning organization based in Minneapolis, Minnesota. It provides intergenerational dance and storytelling programs primarily for the purpose of improving the health and well-being of residents of long-term care facilities, notably those who are physically frail, have Parkinson's or have mid-to-late-stage Alzheimer's. Originally known as Kairos Dance Theater, the organization was founded in 1999 by professional dancer and choreographer Maria Genné. Ms. Genné (MEd, University of North Dakota) serves as the organization's artistic director. She is a proponent of intergenerational interactive participatory dance theater, who believes this type of activity has the power to "nurture, heal, and create community among all ages, abilities and cultural backgrounds".

A story in the October 2011 issue of AARP Bulletin describes a study on the work of Kairos Alive! by researchers at St. Catherine University in St. Paul, Minnesota. In this study, researchers examined the effect of Kairos Alive! programming on the residents of long-term care facilities. According to the AARP article, researchers found "the majority of residents' balance and memory either improved or remained the same — notable for this population — and social interaction increased". The AARP article quotes St. Catherine University occupational therapist Catherine Sullivan as saying, "People who normally would not pay attention for more than five minutes were engaged for an hour and a half. The program not only triggered memories from music, but allowed people to create new ones, learn new songs, retell one another's stories and recognize each other." The AARP article goes on to say, "Research suggests that creative expression programs can reduce pain and loneliness while increasing mobility, helping cognition and making participants feel valued."

Karios Alive!'s programs include Intergenerational Dance Hall, Dancing Heart™, Community Arts and Wellbeing™, Moving Well™, and the Kairos Alive! Performing Troupe. The work of Kairos Alive! was featured in "Arts & The Mind", a documentary written, produced, and directed by Leo Eaton. Narrated by actress Lisa Kudrow, the documentary focuses on the impact of the arts on the development and behavior of humans in childhood and older age. The documentary was first broadcast by PBS in 2012.
