= Cretin-Derham Hall High School =

Location
- 550 South Albert Street; Saint Paul, Minnesota; United States; 44.925°N 93.158°W

Information
- Type: Private co-ed Catholic high school
- Religious affiliation: Roman Catholic
- Established: 1871 – Cretin High School; 1905 – Derham Hall; 1987 – Cretin-Derham Hall
- Founder: Christian Brothers; Sisters of St. Joseph of Carondelet
- Oversight: Archdiocese of Saint Paul and Minneapolis
- President: Jeb Myers
- Principal: Ben Tierney
- Grades: 9–12
- Gender: Coeducational
- Enrollment: 860 (2025)
- Campus type: Residential Urban
- Colors: Purple; Gold; White
- Song: C-DH Alma Mater
- Athletics conference: Suburban East
- Team name: Raiders
- Rival: Saint Thomas Academy Cadets
- Accreditation: North Central Association of Colleges and Schools
- Newspaper: The Chronicle
- Yearbook: Gemini
- Feeder schools: Nativity of Our Lord, Holy Spirit, Highland Catholic, St. Joseph's of West St. Paul
- Website: cretin-derhamhall.org
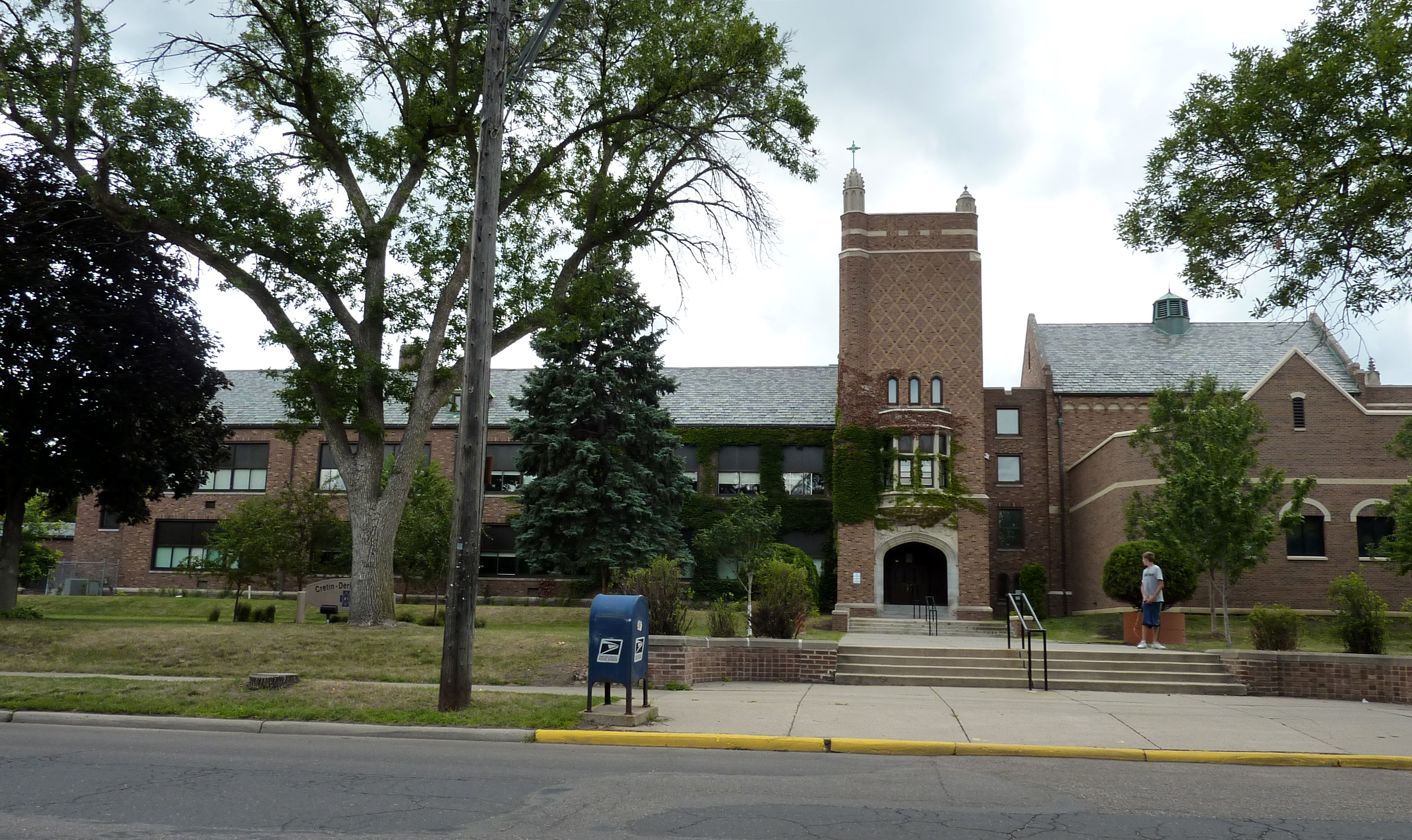

Cretin-Derham Hall High School (CDH) is a private, co-educational Catholic high school in Saint Paul, Minnesota, United States. Operated by the Archdiocese of Saint Paul and Minneapolis, it is co-sponsored by the Brothers of the Christian Schools and the Sisters of St. Joseph of Carondelet.

Cretin High School was named for Joseph Crétin, the first Catholic bishop of Saint Paul, while Derham Hall High School was named for Hugh Derham, a Minnesota farmer who donated money to start an all-female Catholic boarding school.

== History ==
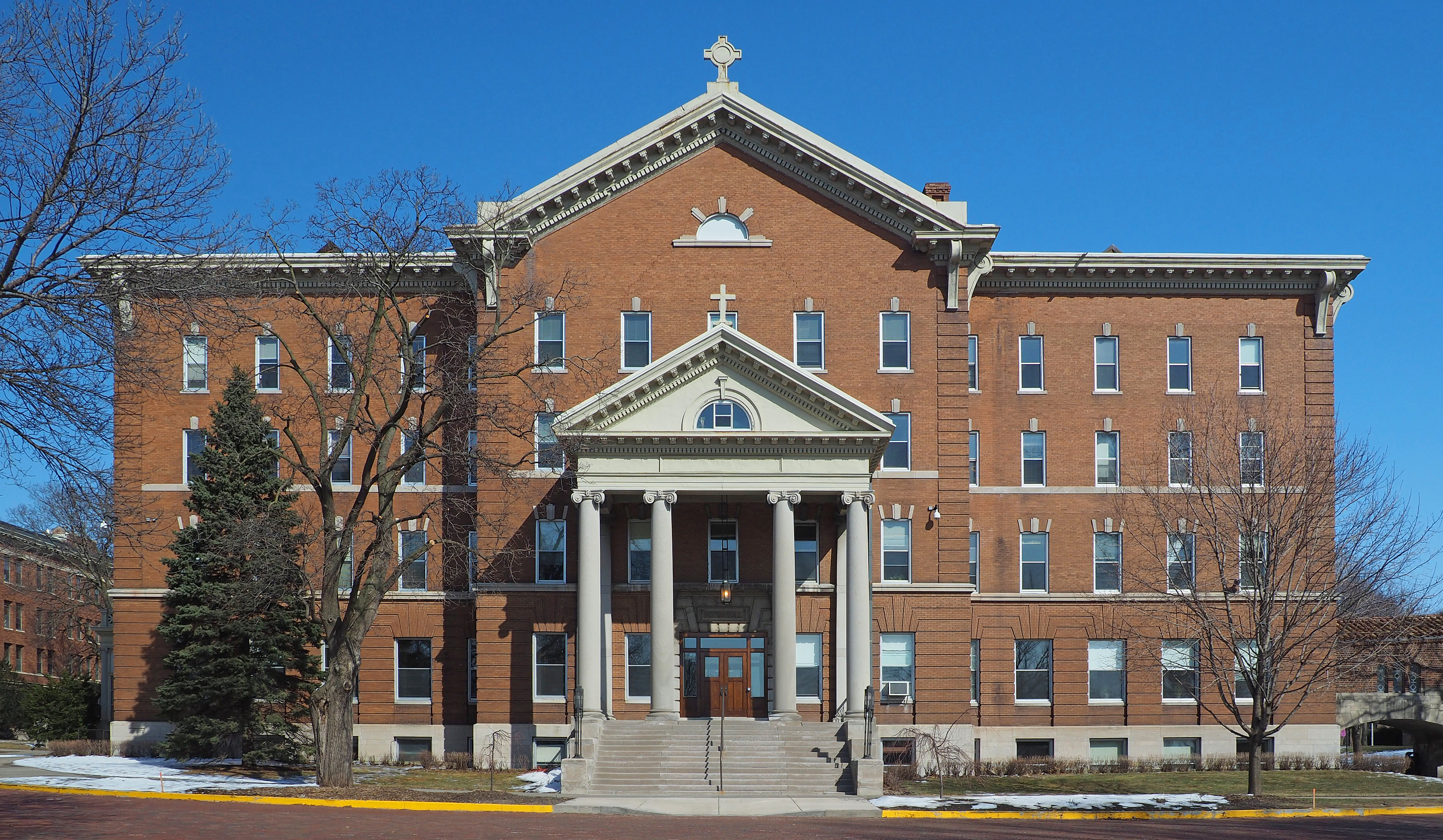
The original Derham Hall on the campus of St. Catherine University

The present-day Cretin-Derham Hall is the result of the 1987 merger of Cretin High School and Derham Hall. The origins of Cretin High School begin at the second cathedral of the diocese, where the Cathedral School operated out of the basement. Bishop John Ireland had long been asking for the Christian Brothers to come operate the Cathedral School. In 1871, after the Great Chicago Fire destroyed two Christian Brothers schools, two brothers moved to Minnesota and took charge of the Cathedral School. When the second cathedral was badly damaged and demolished after a fire in 1886, a new building in downtown Saint Paul was constructed. Around that time, while still formally called Cathedral School, it began to be informally called Cretin High School or Cretin Hall after its auditorium. The building became inadequate for the institution's needs, and in 1926 Cretin High School moved to a site on Laurel and Mackubin Streets. The current building, at Hamline and Randolph, opened in 1928, built with a gift from the widow of James J. Hill.

In the late 1800s, the school incorporated a mandatory program of instruction grounded in the tradition of a military institute, which makes it one of the oldest such programs in the United States. Instruction included lessons in leadership, close-order drill and ceremonies, and numerous other strictly non-combat-related instruction designed to instill a sense of discipline and order in all aspects of student life. The National Defense Act of 1916 created the Reserve Officers' Training Corps (ROTC), a more formal program of instruction with national oversight for training standards and a provision for active duty and retired soldiers and officers as instructors. Cretin's "military program" became one of the first Junior ROTC (JROTC) programs in the country, and participation remained mandatory for all students until the early 1980s, when it became voluntary.

In 1905, the Sisters of St. Joseph of Carondelet established Derham Hall as a college preparatory school for girls in Derham Hall, on the campus of St. Catherine University (then the College of St. Catherine). In 1987, the two merged to become Cretin-Derham Hall, a co-educational institution. The original building on the St. Catherine campus is listed on the National Register of Historic Places.

== Athletics ==
Cretin-Derham Hall is part of the Suburban East Conference in the Minnesota State High School League. Before joining the Suburban East Conference, Cretin-Derham Hall played in the Saint Paul City Conference for 26 years. The Raiders won their tenth state football championship in 2009, defeating Eden Prairie in the title game. They won their third state basketball championship in 2018, defeating Apple Valley in the title game.

=== State championships ===
List of Cretin-Derham Hall athletics state championships won
| Season | Sport | Number | Years | Ref. |
|---|---|---|---|---|
| Fall | Cross country, Boys | 1 | 1975 | |
| Fall | Football | 2 | 1999, 2009 | |
| Winter | Hockey, Boys | 1 | 2006 | |
| Winter | Basketball, Girls | 1 | 1999 | |
| Winter | Basketball, Boys | 3 | 1991, 1993, 2018 | |
| Spring | Baseball | 12 | 1981, 1982, 1986, 1989, 1990, 1992, 1996, 1997, 1998, 2001, 2007, 2025 | |
| Total | | 20 | | |

== Theater ==
Cretin-Derham Hall has a both a co-curricular and an extracurricular theater program. The Cretin-Derham Hall theater department once won the Minnesota State High School League One Act Competition, but no longer participates.

In 2005, the theater department was one of about 20 schools invited to perform at the Edinburgh Festival Fringe in Edinburgh, Scotland. The invitation was "based on their most recent bodies of work, awards, community involvement, philosophies, and recommendations".

The 2009 spring musical, Crazy for You, won an Outstanding awards for Overall Production of a Musical, Performance by a Chorus Ensemble, Performance by a Dance Ensemble, and two for Performances in a Leading Role from Spotlight Musical Theatre Awards. In addition, three Honorable Mentions were given to Performance in a Lead Role, Performance in a Supporting Role, and Performance in a Featured Role.

== Notable alumni ==
- John Albers - former CEO of Dr Pepper and 7-Up companies
- Mark Alt - former hockey defenseman for several NHL teams
- Brandon Archer - former NFL linebacker, played at Kansas State University
- Matt Birk - former center, Minnesota Vikings and Baltimore Ravens, 2012 Super Bowl Champion
- Tommy Brennan - comedian and current Saturday Night Live cast member
- James Byrne - Auxiliary Bishop of Saint Paul (1947–1956), Bishop of Boise (1956–1962), Archbishop of Dubuque (1962–1983)
- Thomas R. Byrne - mayor of Saint Paul (1966–1970)
- Chris Coleman - mayor of Saint Paul (2006–2018)
- Jashon Cornell - former defensive end for the Detroit Lions, played at Ohio State University.
- Ian Anthony Dale - actor
- John Michael Drexler - businessman and Minnesota state legislator
- Jake Esch - former MLB baseball pitcher
- Michael Floyd - former NFL player
- David Housewright - author, president of the Private Eye Writers of America
- Joe Mauer - former first baseman and catcher, Minnesota Twins, 2009 American League MVP, and Baseball Hall of Famer.
- Ryan McDonagh - NHL defenseman, two-time Stanley Cup champion with the Tampa Bay Lightning
- Paul Moga - Major General in the United States Air Force, Commandant of Cadets of the United States Air Force Academy from 2021 to 2023, former F-22A Raptor demonstration pilot, and former television show host.
- Paul Molitor - former player for Milwaukee Brewers, former manager of Minnesota Twins and Baseball Hall of Famer
- Daniel Oturu (born 1999) – basketball player for Hapoel Tel Aviv of the Israeli Basketball Premier League; formerly NBA player, Los Angeles Clippers, Memphis Grizzlies, Toronto Raptors, Chicago Bulls
- Robert W. Reif - Minnesota state legislator and physician
- John A. Ryan (1887) - economist and theologian
- Heidemarie Martha Stefanyshyn-Piper - astronaut, assisted in initial reassembly of International Space station with NASA
- Tim Tschida - Major League Baseball umpire
- Joseph Votel - General, commander of Joint Special Operations
- Steve Walsh - NFL player
- Mark Wegner - Major League Baseball umpire
- Chris Weinke - NFL player
