= Zaynab Abdi =

Women's rights advocate and speaker (born 1995/1996)

Zaynab Abdi (born 1995 or 1996) is an American immigration, refugee, and women's rights advocate and speaker.

== Early life and education ==
Abdi was born in Somalia to a Somalian mother and Yemeni father. Due to the Somali Civil War, she moved to Yemen with her family, although without her father, at the age of seven. She played soccer as a child in Aden, Yemen, and decided she wanted to be an architect. While living in Yemen, Abdi's mother received a diversity immigrant visa to come to the United States. She chose to immigrate, with the hope of becoming a citizen and sponsoring the rest of her family; Abdi and her younger sister were left in the care of her grandmother. Abdi's mother went on to remarry in the United States, and had two more daughters. Her grandmother died in 2010.

Abdi and her sister moved to Cairo, Egypt in 2012 after the Arab Spring began in Yemen. When the second Arab Spring happened in Egypt, Abdi and her sister applied to becomes asylum seekers in the United States. Abdi immigrated to the United States in 2014, at age 17, and joined her mother in Minnesota, but her sister was unable to obtain a visa.

Abdi attended Wellstone International High School in Minneapolis, Minnesota, where she learned English, became a member of the student council, and formed a school soccer team. She went on to attend St. Catherine University beginning in 2016, where she studied political science, international studies, and philosophy. She graduated in 2020.

After graduating college, she joined a soccer team based in the Twin Cities. In 2017, the team became eligible to represent the United States in an international tournament, but Abdi, as a green card holder unable to leave the country, was unable to play.

She went on to pursue her master's degree at Columbia University.

== Career ==
After graduating college in 2020, Abdi became a civic engagement coordinator for Reviving the Islamic Sisterhood for Empowerment (RISE), a Minneapolis-based nonprofit.

Abdi has worked for Green Card Voices, a publishing organization helping immigrants in Minnesota, as an immigrant and youth ambassador.

In 2023, Abdi published the graphic novel Voice for Refuge: Our Stories Carried Us Here. She founded a soccer team for immigrant and refugee children. She was the delegate for the Malala Fund organization at the United Nations Social Good Summit.

== Personal life ==
Abdi is Muslim. She has a younger sister, who lived in Belgium with her son as of 2021.
