= Trophimus of Arles =

3rd century Gallo-Roman founding bishop of Arles

Saint Trophimus of Arles
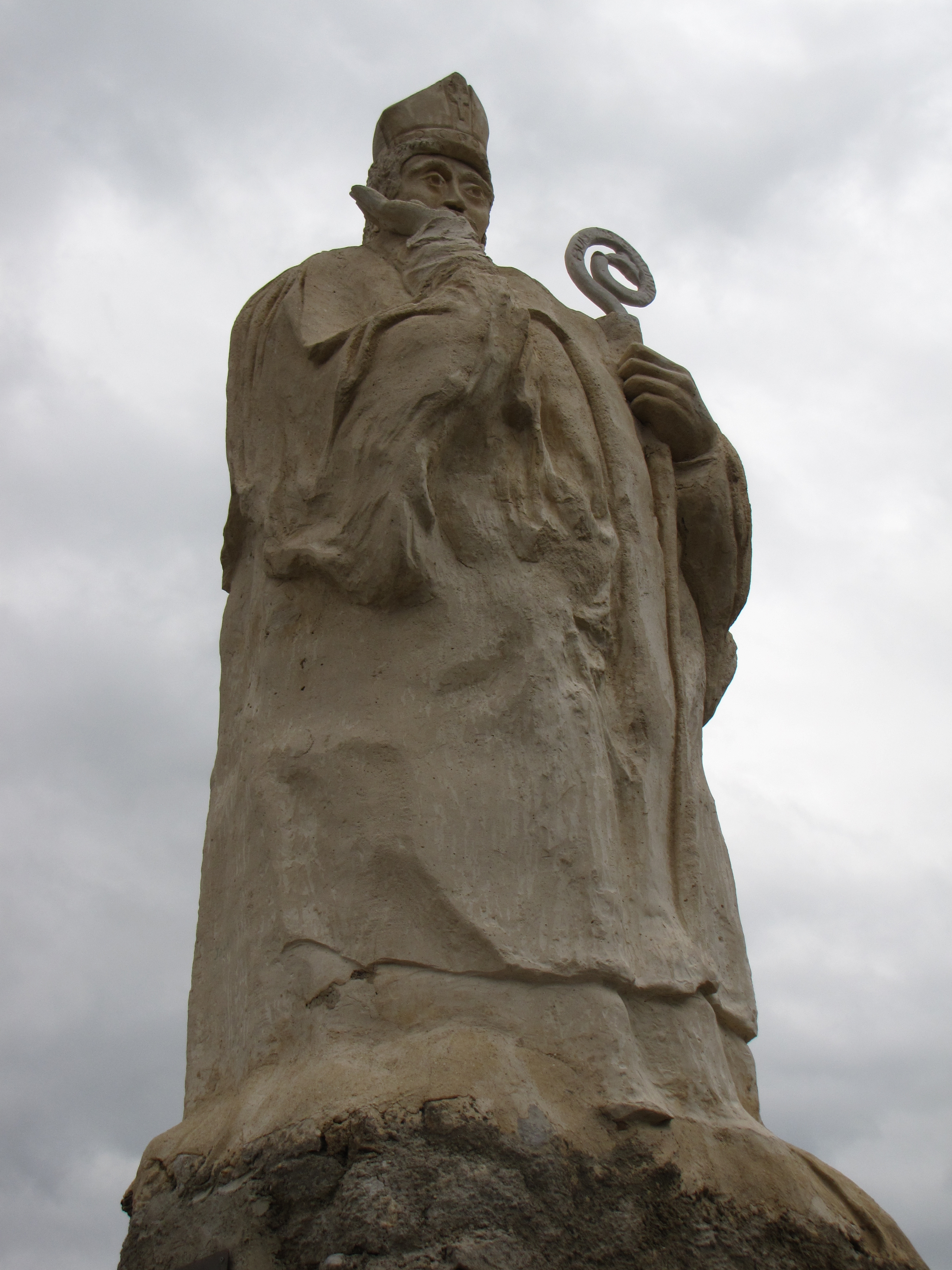
- Statue of Trophimus. Chapelle de Saint-Trophime, Buis-les-Baronnies.

Bishop
- Died: 3rd century
- Venerated in: Roman Catholic Church; Eastern Orthodox Church
- Major shrine: Church of St. Trophime, Arles
- Feast: 29 December (Roman Catholic Church); 4 January (Eastern Orthodox Church)
- Attributes: bishop carrying his eyes; bishop having his eyes put out; bishop standing with lions
- Patronage: against drought; against gout; Arles; children

According to Catholic Tradition, Trophimus of Arles (French: Trophime) was the first bishop of Arles, in today's southern France.

== History ==
It was an early tradition of the Catholic Church (Note: In 417 Pope Zosimus wrote letters to the bishops of Gaul, in favour of Patroclus, bishop of Arles. In one he mentions that the Holy See had sent Trophimus into Gaul, where he was the source of "true faith", which implicitly contrasts Trophimus with the Arianism current among the Goths in control of Arles at the time Zosimus was writing.) that under the co-Emperors Decius and Herennius Etruscus (251 AD), Pope Fabian sent out seven bishops from Rome to Gaul, to preach the Gospel: Gatien to Tours, Trophimus to Arles, Paul to Narbonne, Saturninus to Toulouse, Denis to Paris, Austromoine to Clermont, and Martial to Limoges.

Gregory of Tours, apparently quoting from the Acta of Saint Saturninus, says in effect that Trophimus arrived in Gaul with the first bishops of Tours, Paris, and other cities after the middle of 3rd century, in the consulate of Decius and Gratus.

From the mid-fifth century (Note: The earliest conflation noted by Sabine Baring-Gould, The Lives of the Saints, sub 29 December, was in 450, when the official deputation from Arles reported to Pope Leo the Great that Trophimus had been sent out by Saint Peter.) local tradition has assimilated Trophimus of Arles with the Trophimus mentioned in the Acts of the Apostles as a companion of Paul the Apostle. The Martyrium romanum identifies him as the disciple of Paul, but the identification is spurious. (Note: Compare Saint Denis of Paris, identified with St Denis the Areopagite.) Trophîme, as he is in French, does not rate a biography in the Catholic Encyclopedia, but the church at Arles dedicated to him, built from the 12th century onwards over a third-century crypt, is one of the monuments of Romanesque architecture and sculpture in Provence. In its cloister a corner figure in the north gallery, dated about 1180, represents Trophimus.

Trophimus is considered by the Catholic Church the protector of those with gout.

== Sources ==
- Pietrangeli, Carlo (1979). Guide rionali di Roma (in Italian). Vol. Regola (III) (2 ed.). Roma: Fratelli Palombi Editori.
