= Derham Hall and Our Lady of Victory Chapel =

Historic campus buildings in Minnesota

- U.S. National Register of Historic Places
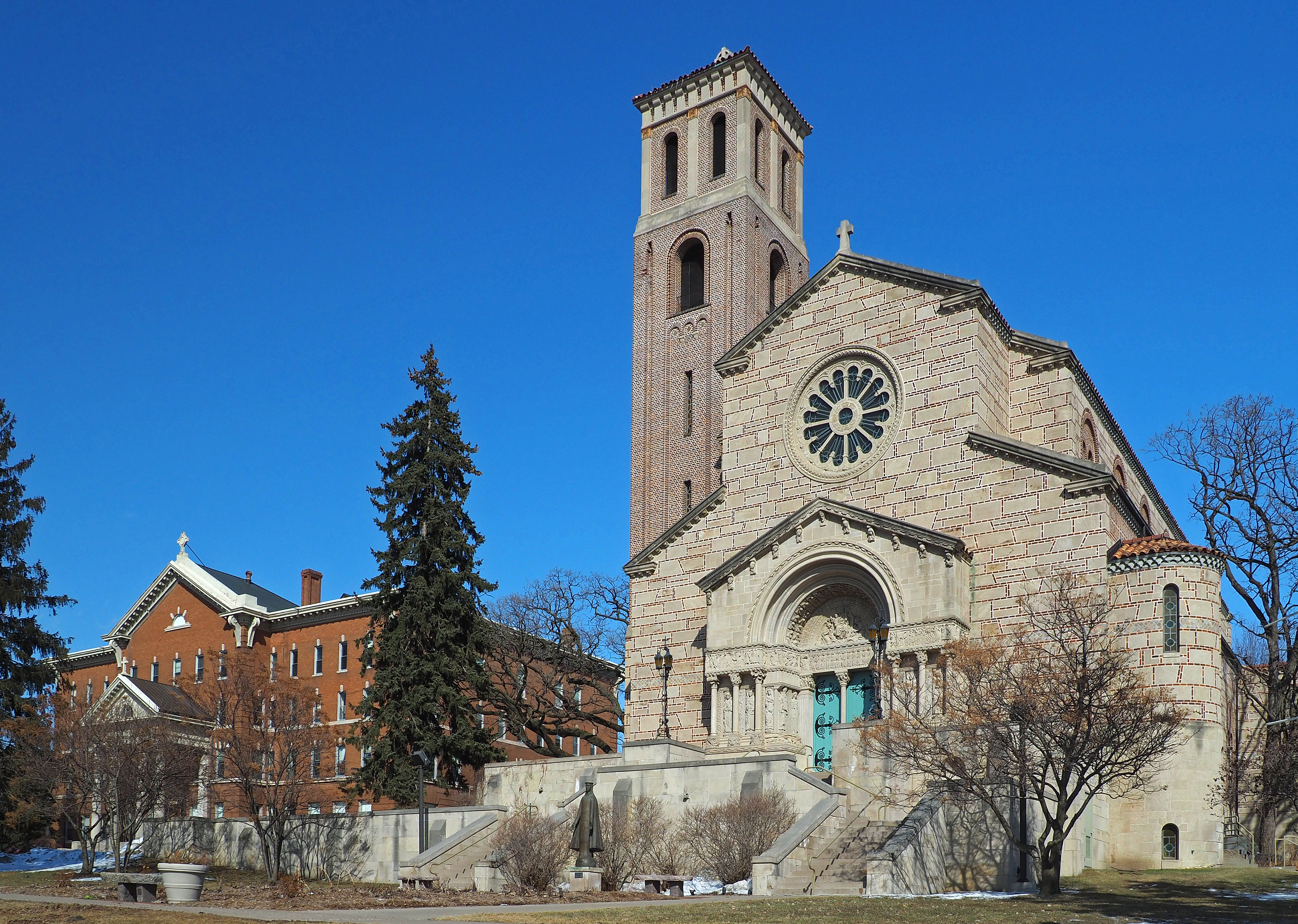
- Derham Hall and Our Lady of Victory Chapel viewed from the southwest

- Location within Minnesota Location within the United States
- Location: St. Catherine University, 2004 Randolph Avenue, St. Paul, Minnesota
- Coordinates: 44°55′32″N 93°11′3″W
- Area: Less than one acre
- Built: 1903–04 (Hall), 1923 (Chapel)
- Architect: John H. Wheeler (Hall), Herbert A. Sullwold (Chapel)
- Architectural style: Romanesque Revival (Chapel)
- NRHP reference No.: 85003423
- Designated: October 31, 1985

Derham Hall and Our Lady of Victory Chapel are administrative and religious buildings, respectively, at St. Catherine University in Saint Paul, Minnesota. Derham Hall was built from 1903 to 1904 and Our Lady of Victory Chapel was constructed in 1923. The two buildings were jointly listed on the National Register of Historic Places in 1985 for their local significance in the themes of architecture, education, and religion. They were nominated for being the core buildings of Minnesota's oldest Catholic liberal arts college for women, with well-preserved collegiate architecture of their respective eras.

== Derham Hall ==
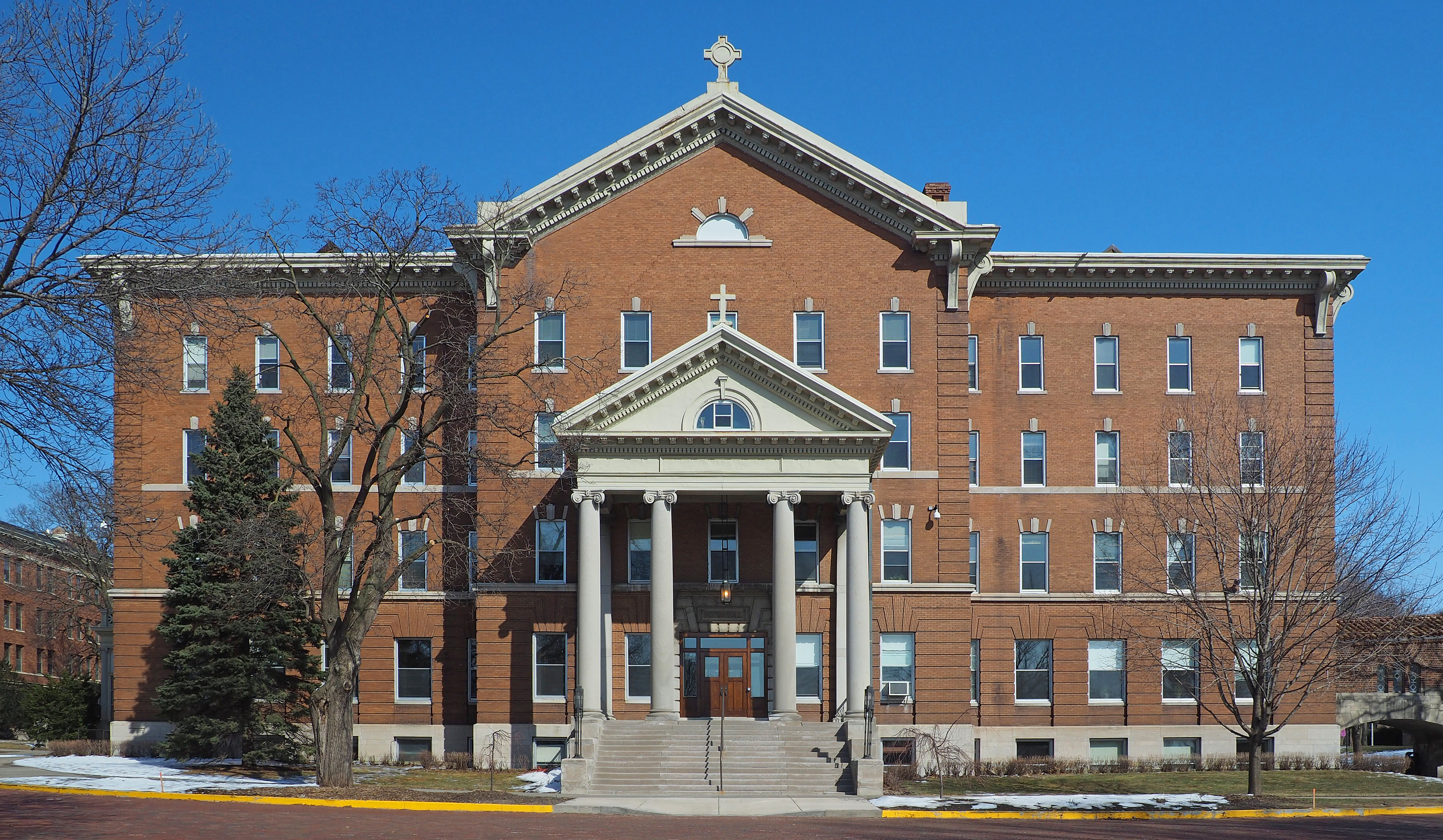
Derham Hall viewed from the west

Derham Hall is the oldest building at St. Catherine University, formerly known as the College of St. Catherine. It was named for Hugh Derham of Rosemount, Minnesota, who donated $20,000 to construct the building. Derham Hall originally housed Derham Hall High School, an all-girls Catholic high school, until 1962; that school later merged to become Cretin-Derham Hall High School in 1987.

== Our Lady of Victory Chapel ==
Our Lady of Victory Chapel was completed in 1924, under the direction of Mother Antonia McHugh, who helped found St. Catherine in 1905 and served as its leader for more than 30 years. The chapel was dedicated on October 7, 1924, and rededicated following renovation on May 1, 1958. It was designed by H.A. Sullwold in the Romanesque Revival style and influenced by the Church of St. Trophime in Arles, Provence, France.

The entrance features friezes depicting Christ, the Twelve Apostles and the university's patron saint, St. Catherine of Alexandria. The statues of the saints are a kind of Who's Who of St. Catherine University (also known as St. Kate's) circa 1924. St. Anthony of Padua is there to evoke Mother Antonia herself; the image of St. Augustine of Canterbury honors Austin Dowling, the Archbishop of Saint Paul and Minneapolis in 1924. St. Joseph is present in his role as patron of the Sisters of St. Joseph of Carondelet, and St. John recalls the great John Ireland, the archbishop presiding when St. Kate's was first conceived. St. Teresa of Avila is there because the Sisters of St. Joseph, founders of St. Kate's, became a congregation on her feast day. Thérèse of Lisieux is on the portal because Mother Antonia was passionate about the cause of her canonization. (Thérèse became a saint just a year after the chapel was completed.)

The stained-glass panel behind the altar depicts Christ the King. The ornate tile designs throughout the Chapel reflect symbols of Christianity and the humanities. The barrel vault ceiling reaches a height of 126 feet (38 m).

Our Lady of Victory offers sacred liturgy and a place for reflection and prayer. In addition to St. Catherine University's Opening Mass of the Holy Spirit and Baccalaureate liturgy and hooding ceremony, annual events include Advent Vespers, major feast celebrations, and initiation rituals for social work, physical therapy and nursing students.

== See also ==
- National Register of Historic Places listings in Ramsey County, Minnesota
