= Church of St. Trophime, Arles =

Church in Bouches-du-Rhône, France

Church of St. Trophime Cathédrale Saint-Trophime d'Arles
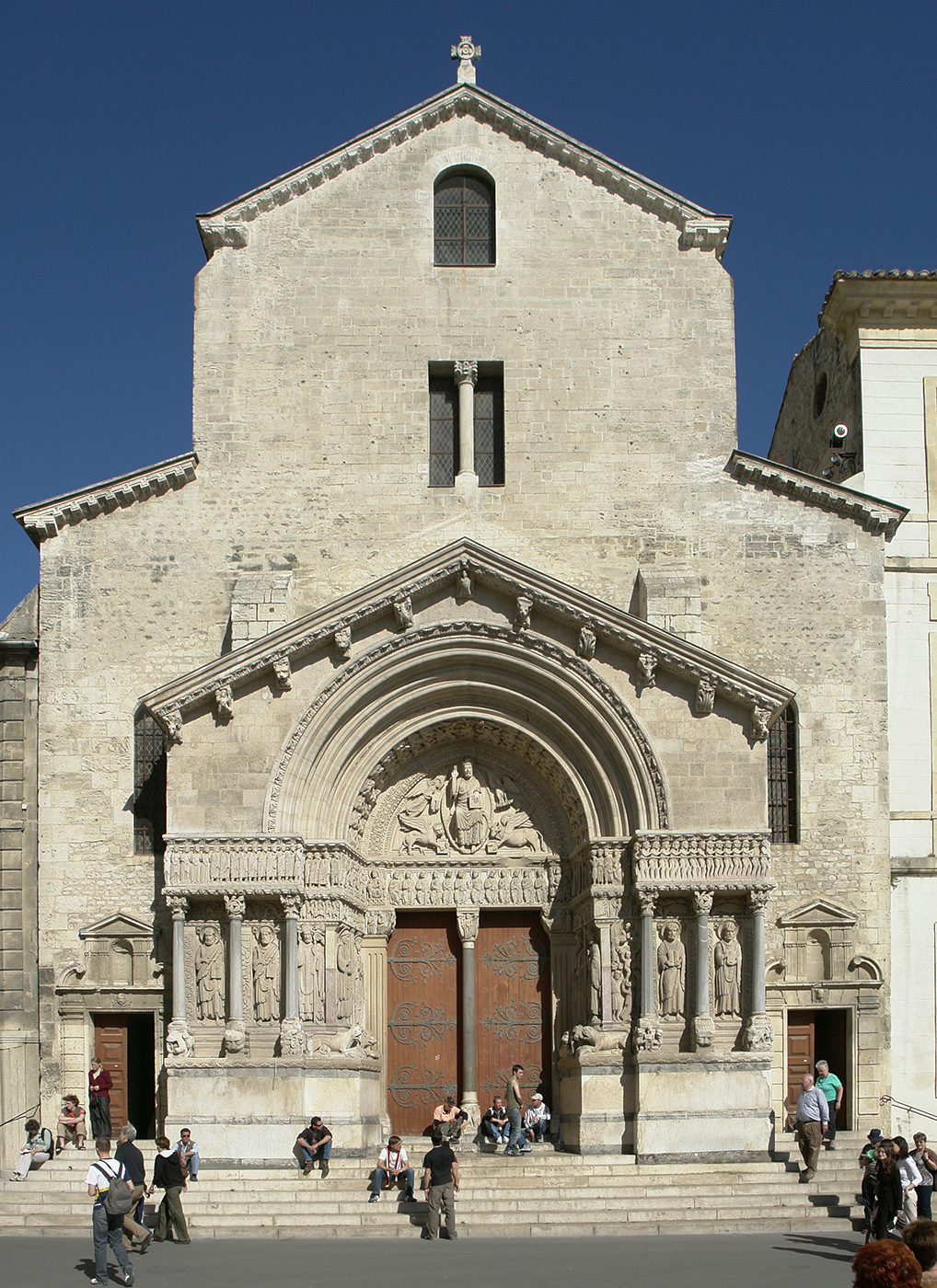
- Portal of Church of Saint Trophime

Religion
- Affiliation: Roman Catholic Church
- Province: Archdiocese of Aix
- Rite: Roman Rite
- Ecclesiastical or organisational status: Cathedral
- Patron: Trophimus of Arles
- Status: Active

Location
- Location: Arles, France
- Interactive map of Church of St. Trophime; Cathédrale Saint-Trophime d'Arles
- Coordinates: 43°40′36″N 4°37′41″E

Architecture
- Type: Church
- Groundbreaking: 12th century
- Completed: 15th century
- UNESCO World Heritage Site
- Official name: Arles, Roman and Romanesque Monuments
- Type: Cultural
- Criteria: ii, iv
- Designated: 1981 (5th session)
- Reference no.: 164
- Region: Europe and North America

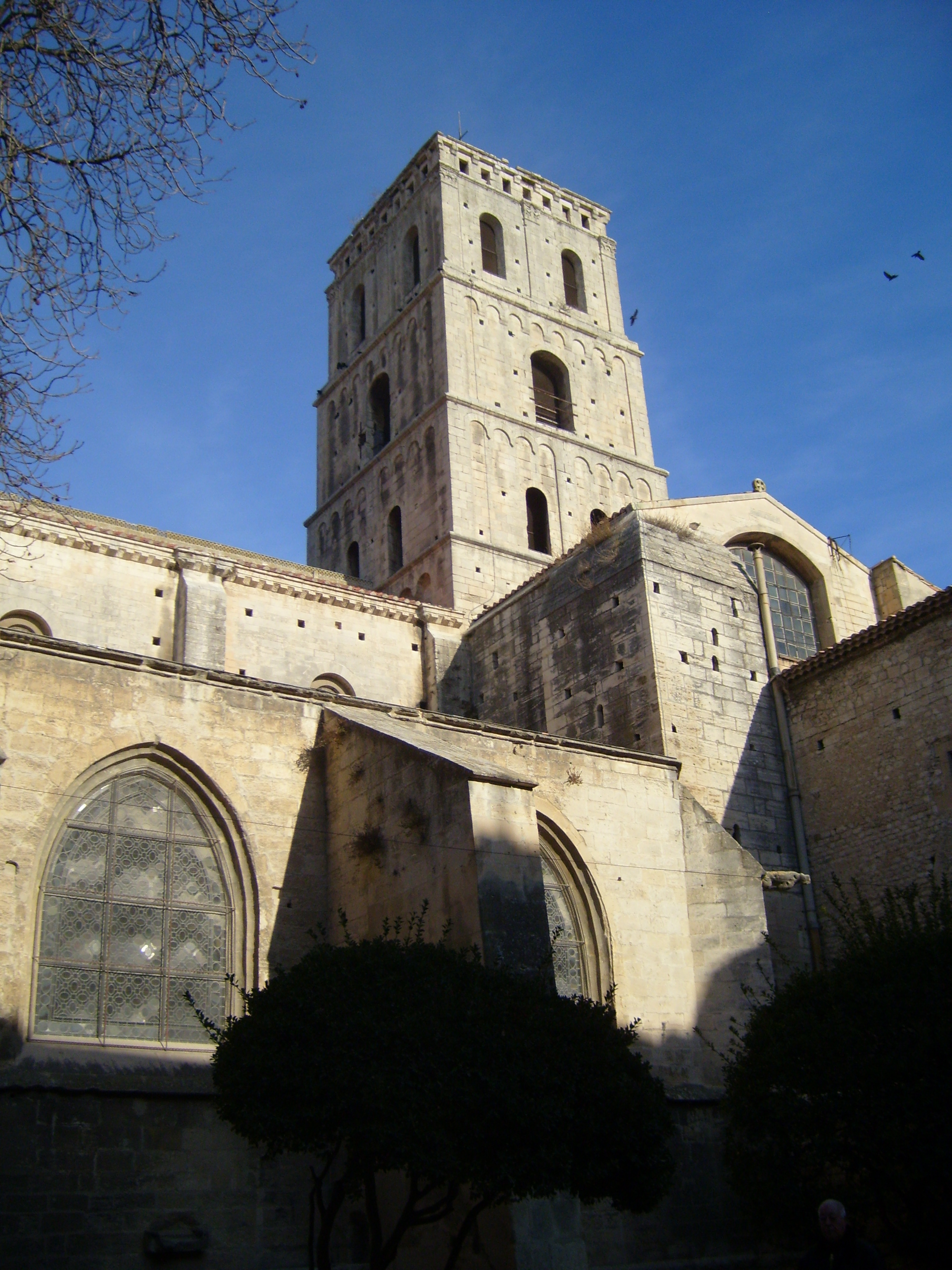
Bell Tower of St. Trophime Church, Arles (12th century)

The Church of St. Trophime (French: Cathédrale Saint-Trophime d'Arles; Occitan: Catedrala Sant-Trofime d'Arle) (Trophimus) is a Roman Catholic church and former cathedral located in the city of Arles, in the Bouches-du-Rhône Department of southern France. It was built between the 12th century and the 15th century, and is in the Romanesque architectural tradition. The sculptures over the church's portal, particularly the Last Judgement, and the columns in the adjacent cloister, are considered some of the finest examples of Romanesque sculpture.

The church was built upon the site of the 5th-century basilica of Arles, named for St. Stephen. In the 15th century a Gothic choir was added to the Romanesque nave.

Along with other medieval and Roman buildings in Arles, in 1981 the church was designated a UNESCO World Heritage Site as part of the Arles, Roman and Romanesque Monuments group.

== Timeline ==
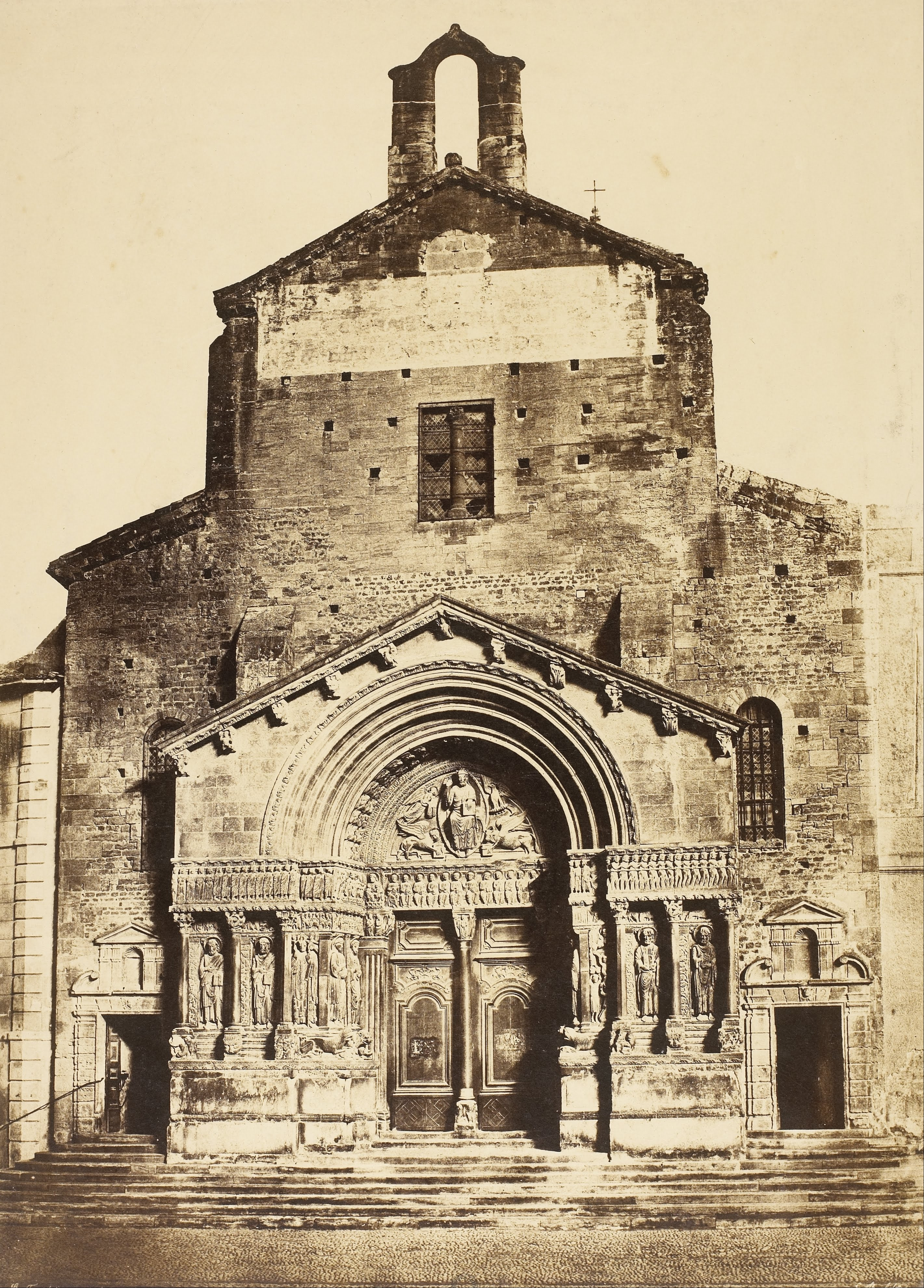
1851 photograph by Édouard Baldus

- 250 According to legend, Trophimus of Arles becomes the first bishop of Arles.
- 597 (November 17). Augustine of Canterbury returns to Arles after converting the King, Queen and principal members of the court of England to Christianity, and is consecrated as bishop of the Church of England by Virgilius of Arles, vicar of the Holy See in Gaul.
- 1152 : (September 29). Raimon de Montredon organizes the transfer of the relics of St. Trophime from the Alyscamps necropolis to the new cathedral.
- 1178 : (July 30). The Emperor of the Holy Roman Empire, Frederick Barbarossa, is crowned at St. Trophime Cathedral by the archbishop of Arles.
- 1365 : (June 4). Following the precedent of Frederick Barbarossa, Emperor Charles IV is crowned king of Arles (Arelat) at St. Trophime Cathedral.
- 1445 to 1465 The Romanesque abside of the church is replaced by a Gothic choir.
- 1801 : When the Bishopric moved to Aix-en-Provence, St. Trophime was reclassified as a simple parish church.
- 1882 : Raised to the level of a minor basilica by Pope Leo XIII.
- 1981 : Classified as a World Heritage Site.

== The Church ==
At the time the cathedral was built, in the late 11th century or early 12th century, Arles was the second-largest city in Provence, with a population of between 15,000 and 20,000 people. It had a busy port on the Rhône, and two new cities, on either side of the old Roman town, surrounded by a wall. It was at least formally independent as the Kingdom of Burgundy-Arles, and it had attracted many religious orders, including the Knights Hospitalier, the Knights Templar and mendicant orders, which had built a number of churches within the town.

The apse and the transept were probably built first, in the late 11th century, and the nave and bell tower were completed in the second quarter of the 12th century. The Romanesque church had a long central nave 20 meters high; lower collateral aisles on either side; a transept supporting the square central bell tower; and a chevet behind the altar at the east end with a hemispherical vault. The windows are small and high up on the nave, above the level of the collateral aisles.

== Post-Romanesque art ==
Though mainly notable for its outstanding Romanesque architecture and sculpture, the church contains rich groups of art from other periods. These include several important carved Late Roman sarcophagi, reliquaries from various periods, and Baroque paintings, with three by Louis Finson. Trophime Bigot is also represented, and there are several Baroque tapestries, including a set of ten on the Life of the Virgin. The church has been used to hold items originally from other churches or religious houses in the region that were dispersed in the French Revolution or at other times.

== The West Portal ==
Tympanum of the west portal

The west portal is one of the treasures of Romanesque sculpture, presenting the story of the Apocalypse according to St. John, and the Gospel of St. Matthew. Christ is seated in majesty in the tympanum, with the symbols of the Evangelists around him; according to the most common interpretation, they are the man of St. Matthew, the lion of St. Mark, the ox of St. Luke, and the eagle of St. John. The Apostles are seated below him. To the left of the portal, a procession of chosen Christians is going to heaven, while to the right sinners are being cast into hell.

The decoration of the portal also includes a multitude of Biblical scenes; the Annunciation; the Baptism of Christ; the Adoration of the Magi, the Magi before Herod; the Massacre of the Innocents; shepherds with their flocks.

On the lower level, separated by pilasters and columns of dark stone, are statues of saints connected with the history of Arles; on the left, St. Bartholomew, St. James the Great, St. Trophimus, St. John the Evangelist, and St. Peter; and on the right, St. Philip, St. James the Just, St. Stephen, St. Andrew, and St. Paul.

The bases of the columns beside the portal are decorated with statues of lions, Samson and Delilah, and Samson and the Lion.

== The Cloister ==
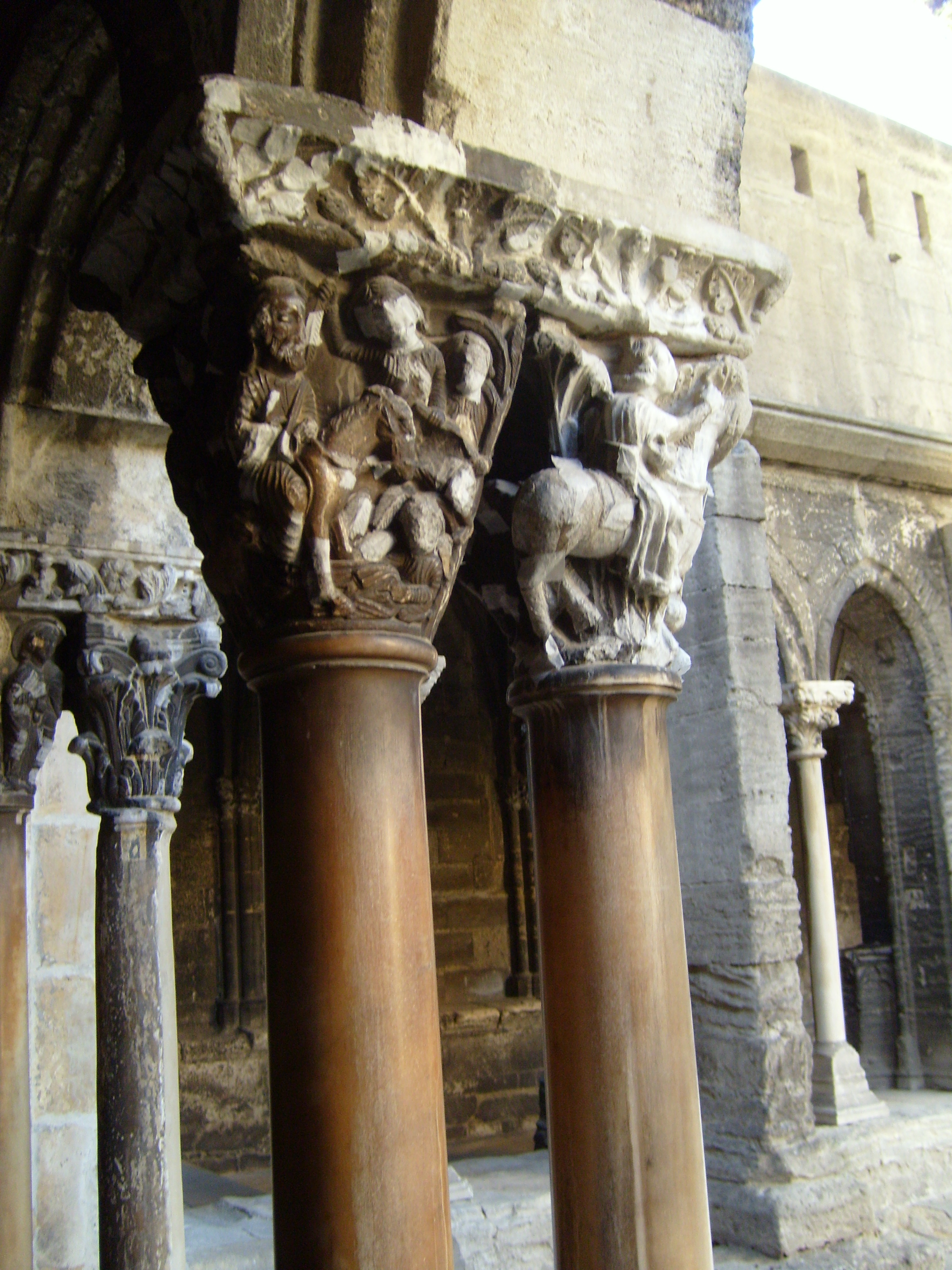
Cloister capital showing Christ entering Jerusalem (east gallery)

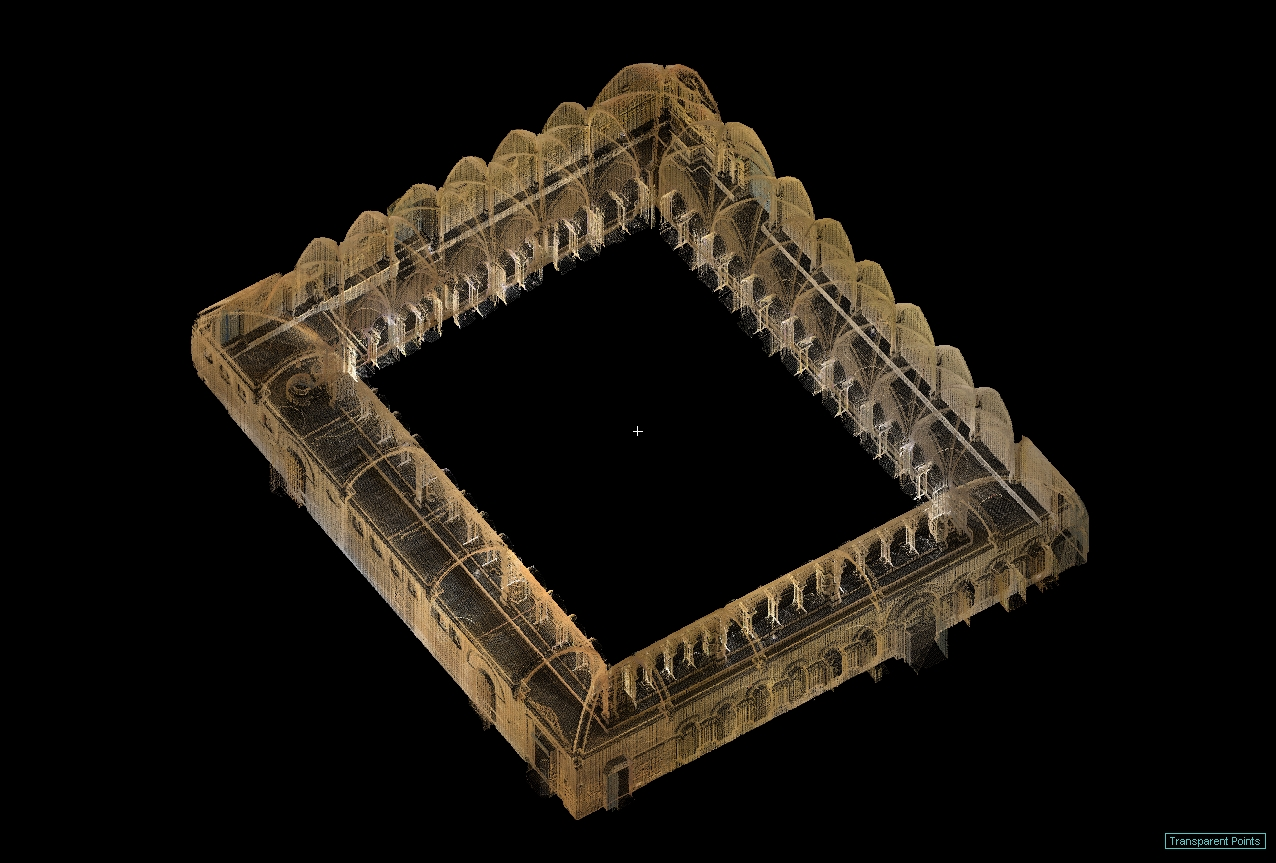
Photo-textured laser scan image of the Cloister of St. Triophime. The image clearly shows the contrast between the vaulting of its different galleries. The north and east galleries (12th to early 13th century) are barrel-vaulted Romanesque, while the later south and west galleries (14th century) are early Gothic in form with pointed transverse arches.

The cloister was constructed in the second half of the 12th century and the first half of the 13th century. for the use of the Canons, the priests who attended the bishop and managed the church property. Under a reform instituted by Pope Gregory, the Canons were required to live like monks, with a common dormitory, refectory and cloister within the cathedral enclosure, separated by a wall from the city.

The refectory, or dining hall, was built first, next to the church, along with a chapter house, or meeting room, for the canons. The dormitory for the canons, a large vaulted room on the east side of the cloister, was built next. Work on the cloister began with the northern gallery, then the eastern gallery, which were finished around 1210–1220. Then work suddenly stopped.

Soon after the construction of the east and west galleries, the city began to decline. The Counts of Provence moved from Arles to Aix, the center of church authority moved to the papal palace in Avignon, and in 1251 Charles of Anjou suppressed the movement of the leaders of Arles for more independence. In 1348, The Black Death drastically reduced the population of all of Provence.

The southern and western galleries of the cloister were not built until the 1380s and 1390s, and they were built in a different style, the Gothic style favored by the Popes in Avignon, with cross-ribbed vaults.

In 1355, the canons gave up living in the dormitory, and moved to houses within the cathedral close. The dormitory, refectory and chapter house were turned into granaries and storehouses.

The northern gallery, built in the second quarter of the 12th century, is purely Romanesque, with a barrel vault ceiling. The carvings of the columns capitals are devoted to the Easter Mystery and to the glorification of the patron saints of Arles. The relationships between the figures on the pillars and the capitals of the columns show the relationships between the Old and New Testaments, a theme introduced in Paris by Suger, the abbot of Saint Denis.

The first corner pillar in the northern gallery is devoted to St. Trophime, the patron saint Arles, between the figures of Saint Peter and Saint John. The bas-relief on the walls show the Christ's empty tomb on Easter morning. The capitals of the columns depict Lazarus coming out of his tomb between Martha and Mary; Abraham about to sacrifice his son; and Balaam on his ass being stopped by a sword-wielding angel.

The next three columns show St. Stephen being stoned, combined with a portrait of St. Paul; Christ encountering the disciples, shown as pilgrims on their way to Compostela, at Emaus; and Christ showing his wounds to the unbelieving Thomas.

The capitals between the columns show three Angels appearing to Abraham; and St. Paul addressing Areopagus of Athens.

The only illustrated capital in the last bay shows Moses meeting God before the burning bush. The Resurrection story concludes on the northeast corner pillar with the Ascension of Jesus, next to the figures of Saint Paul and St. Andrew on either side of St. Stephen.

The Eastern Gallery, built the late 12th or early 13th century, has some Gothic features, including figures in the quoins of wise virgins and foolish virgins and the symbols of the Four Evangelists. The Passion story is told on the pillars, while the life of Christ is depicted on the carved capitals.

The scenes of Christ's childhood can be are read on the capitals from north to south; the Annunciation, the Visitation and the Nativity on the first capital; the next capital shows the coat of arms of Arles and an eagle with spread wings, the symbol of the Holy Roman Emperor, who at the time ruled Arles; the third capital shows the Annunciation to the shepherds, with two startled goats climbing the Tree of Life.

The pillar in the first bay begins the story of the Passion with the flagellation of Christ. On the opposite side is Judas clutching a purse with thirty pieces of silver.

The capitals in the central bay illustrate the story of the Magi, out of historical order; the successive columns show the Massacre of the Innocents; the Flight into Egypt; the angel appearing to the Magi at the inn; the three wise men before Herod; the Adoration of the Magi, and the angel appearing to Joseph in a dream.

The pillar in the second bay has two statues, probably representing St. John and the Mother Church.

The capitals in the third bay illustrate the entry of Christ into Jerusalem, Palm Sunday and Pentecost, and a knight striking down an adversary, and then walking over to a lady; possibly representing Constantine defeating paganism and then being thanked by the mother church.

The southern pillar illustrates the Baptism of Christ and the devil tempting Christ, Christ washing the apostles' feet, the Last Supper and the kiss of Judas.

The Southern Gallery probably dates to the 1380s or 1390s, and is built in the Gothic style, with pointed arches intersecting vaults resting on colonnettes with foliated capitals.

The capitals in the southern gallery are entirely devoted to the story of St. Trophimus; the first shows St. Trophime blessing the Alyscamps burial ground, and dedicating an oratory to the still-living Virgin Mary; the next four show a miracle performed by the intervention of St. Trophime; he brings back to life a knight and nine of his relatives unjustly sentenced to death by the Emperor Charlemagne for slapping the archbishop Turpin.

The Western Gallery probably dates to about 1375, and is devoted to religious figures and scenes popular in Provence; from south to north: the stoning of St. Stephen; Samson slaying the lion and yielding to Delilah; Saint Martha and the Tarasque; Mary Magdalene kissing Christ's feet; the Annunciation in a Gothic setting; the Coronation of the Virgin; and the Pentecost.

== See also ==
- Our Lady of Victory Chapel, a Minnesota church whose architecture was strongly influenced by St. Trophime.
- St Trophimus' Church, Eschau
- High medieval domes

== Gallery ==
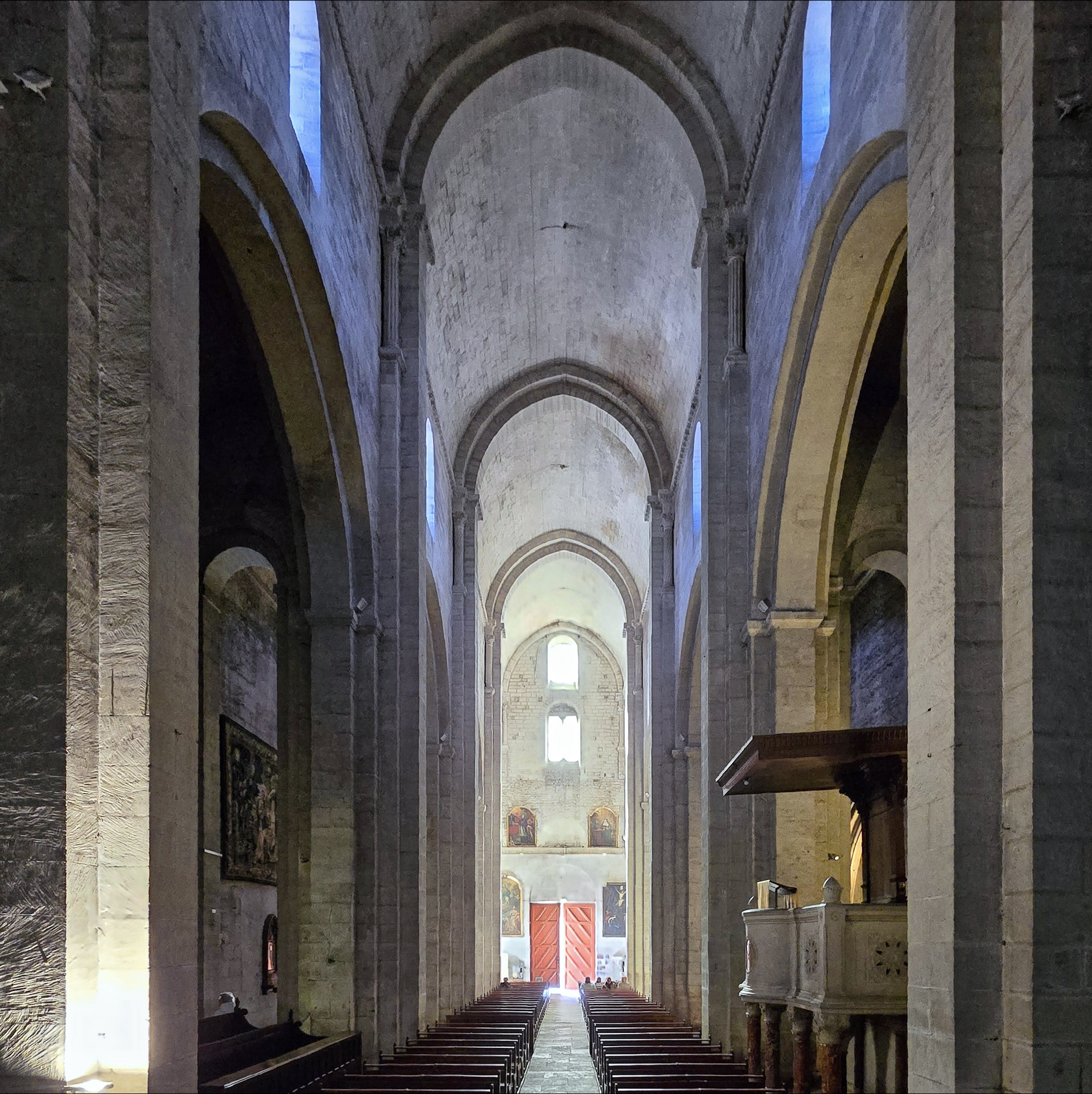
The nave, looking to west front.

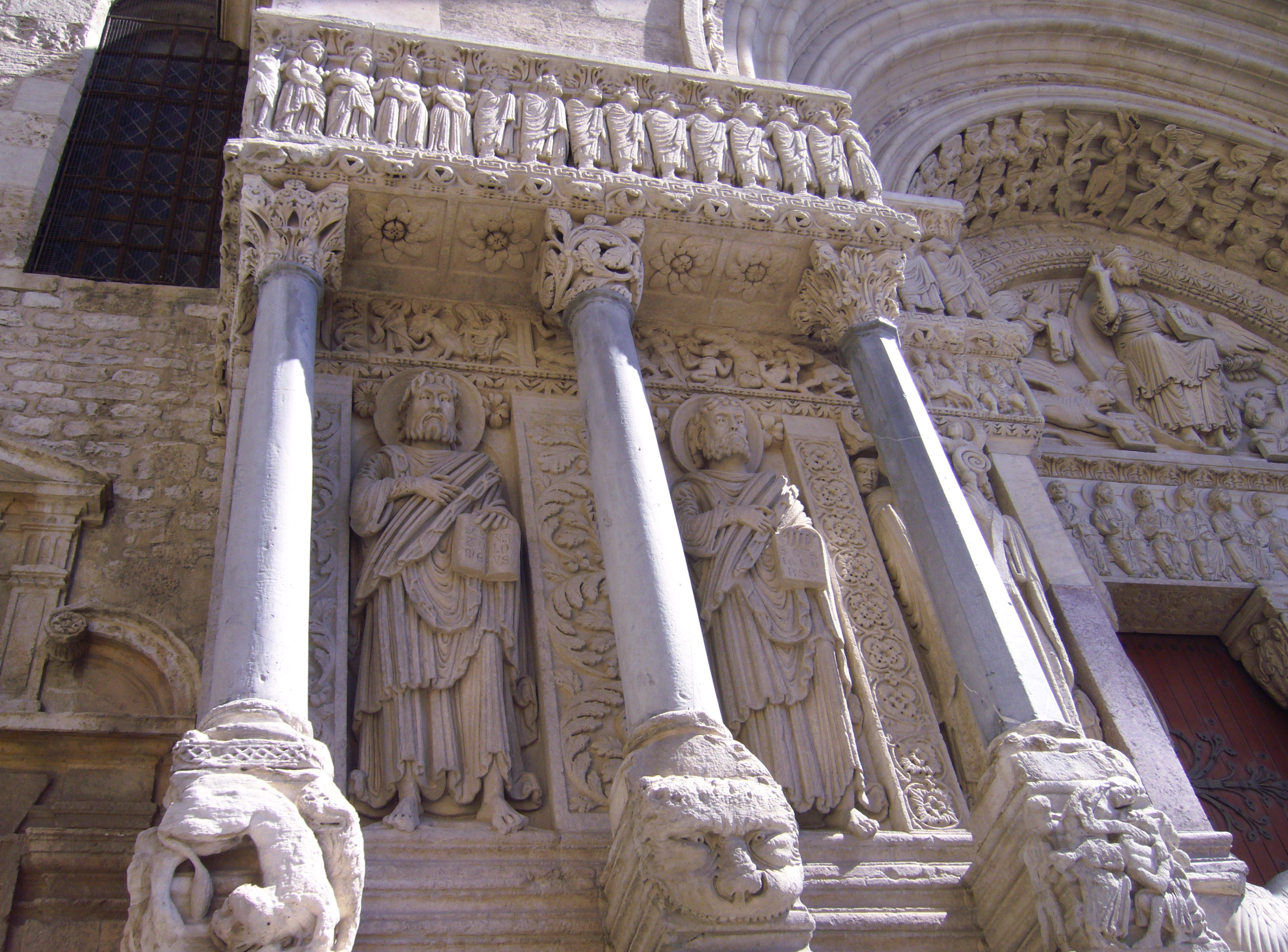
Left side of west portal

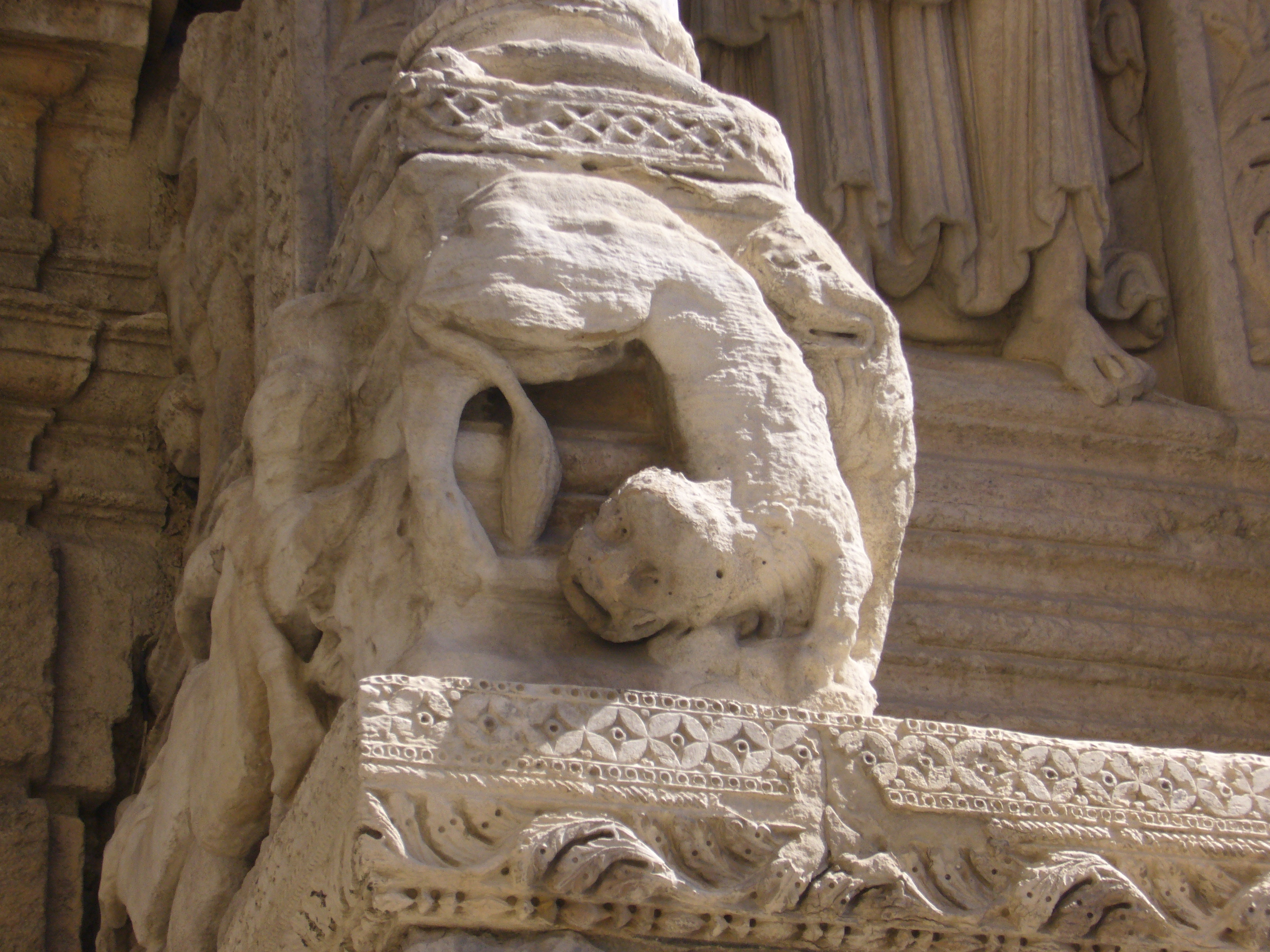
Details of the west portal

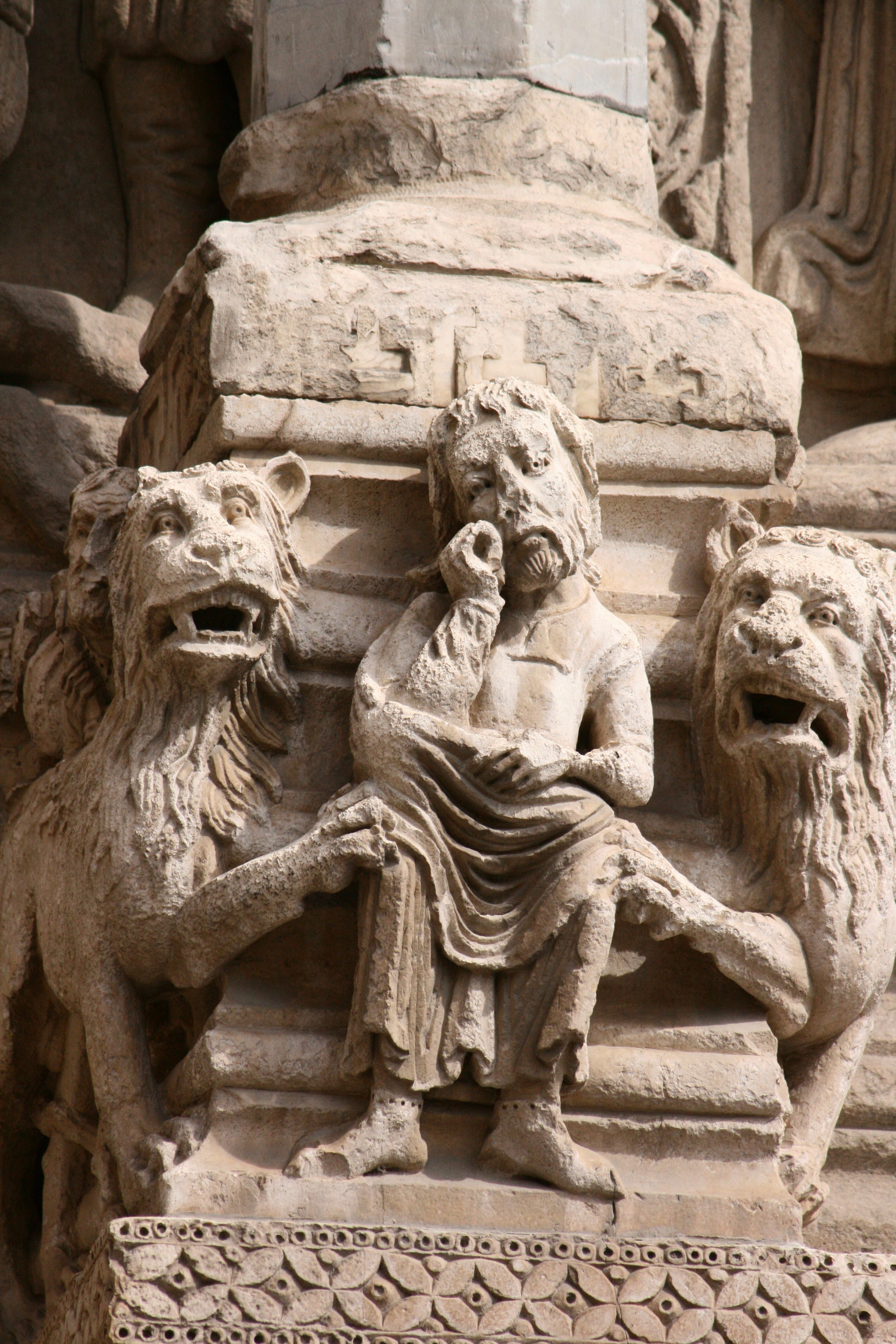
Daniel in the lions' den on the west portal

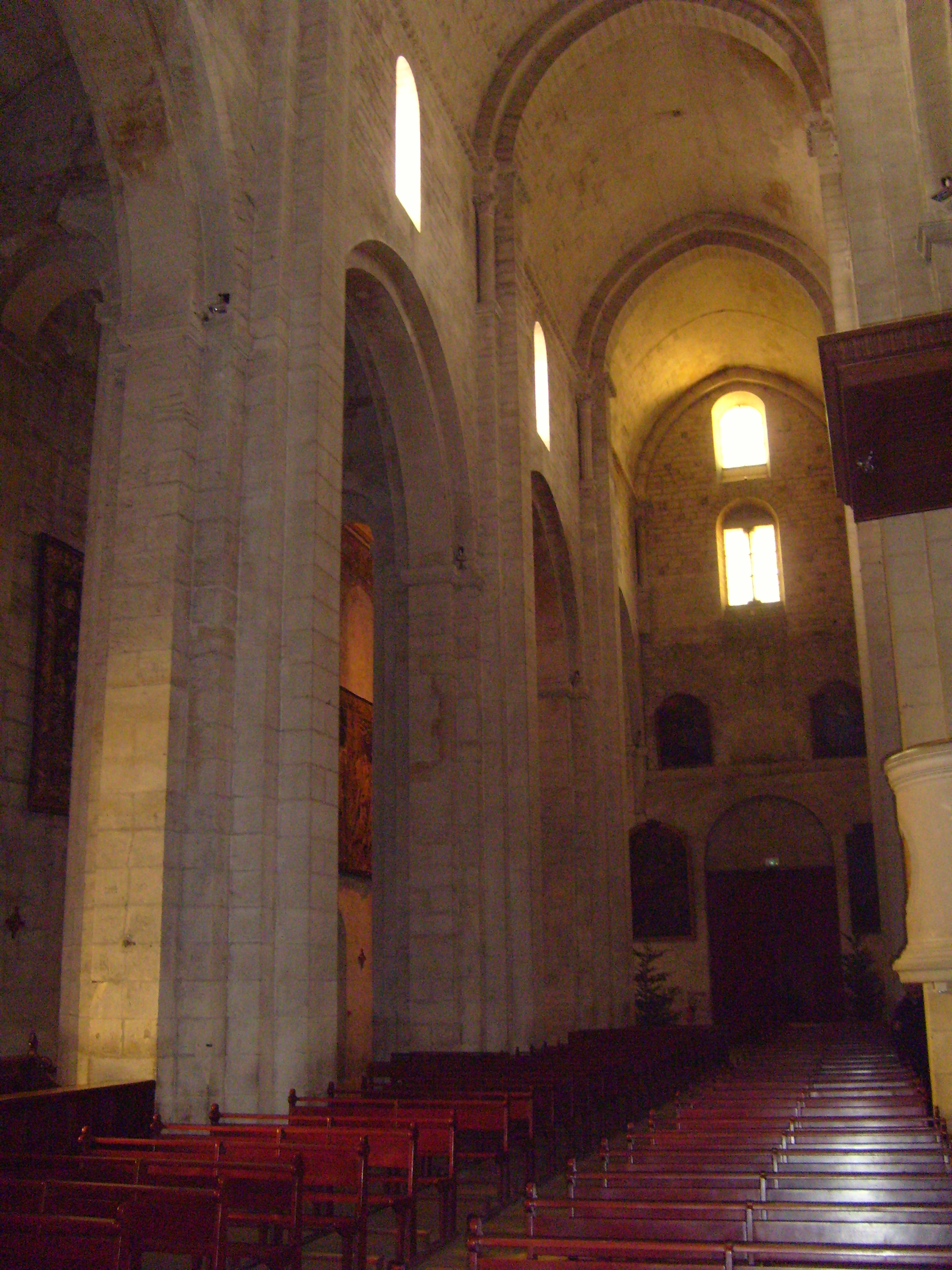
Nave, late 12th to 15th century

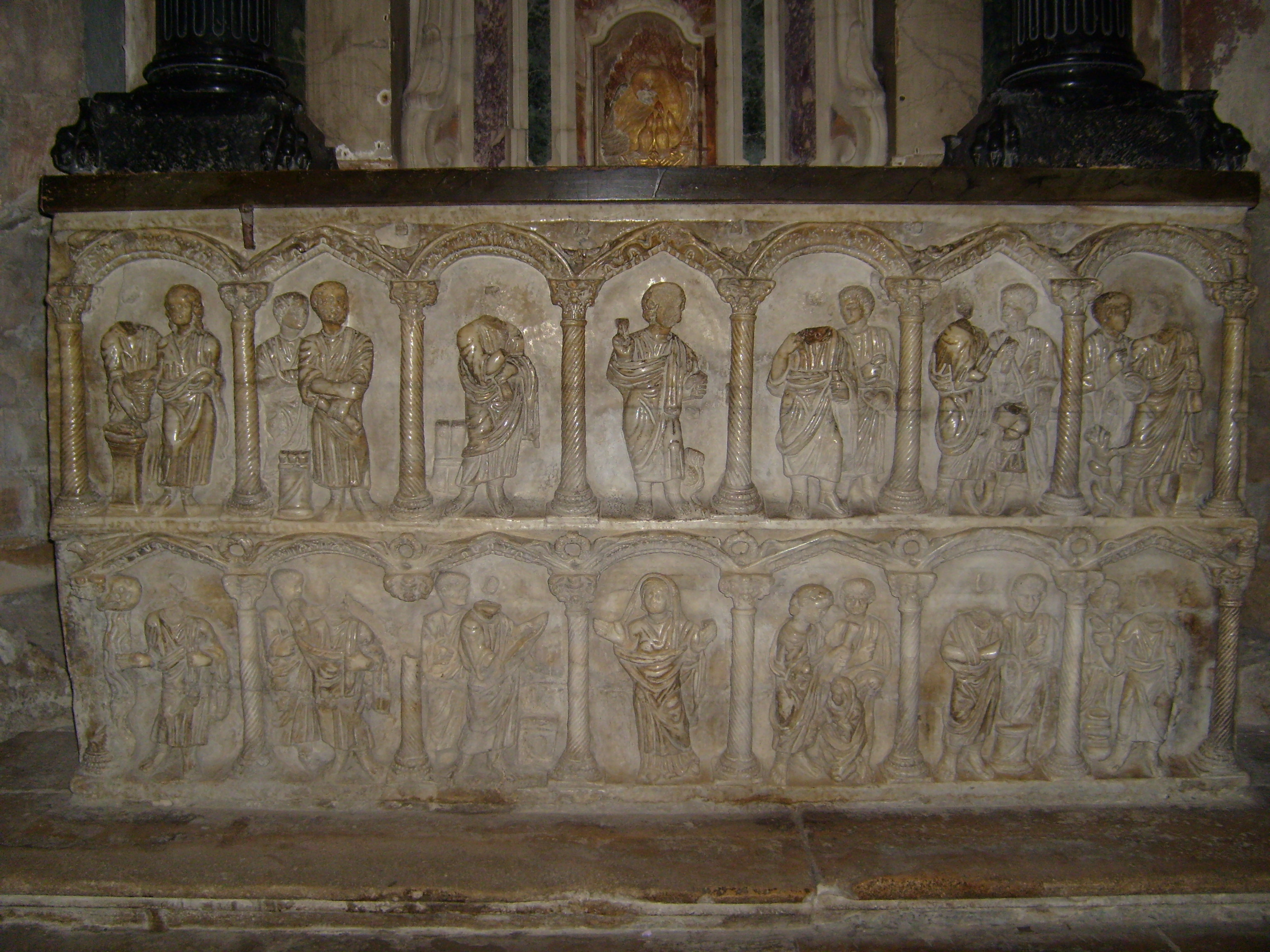
Roman sarcophagus in the church, reputed to hold the remains of Saint Honoratus

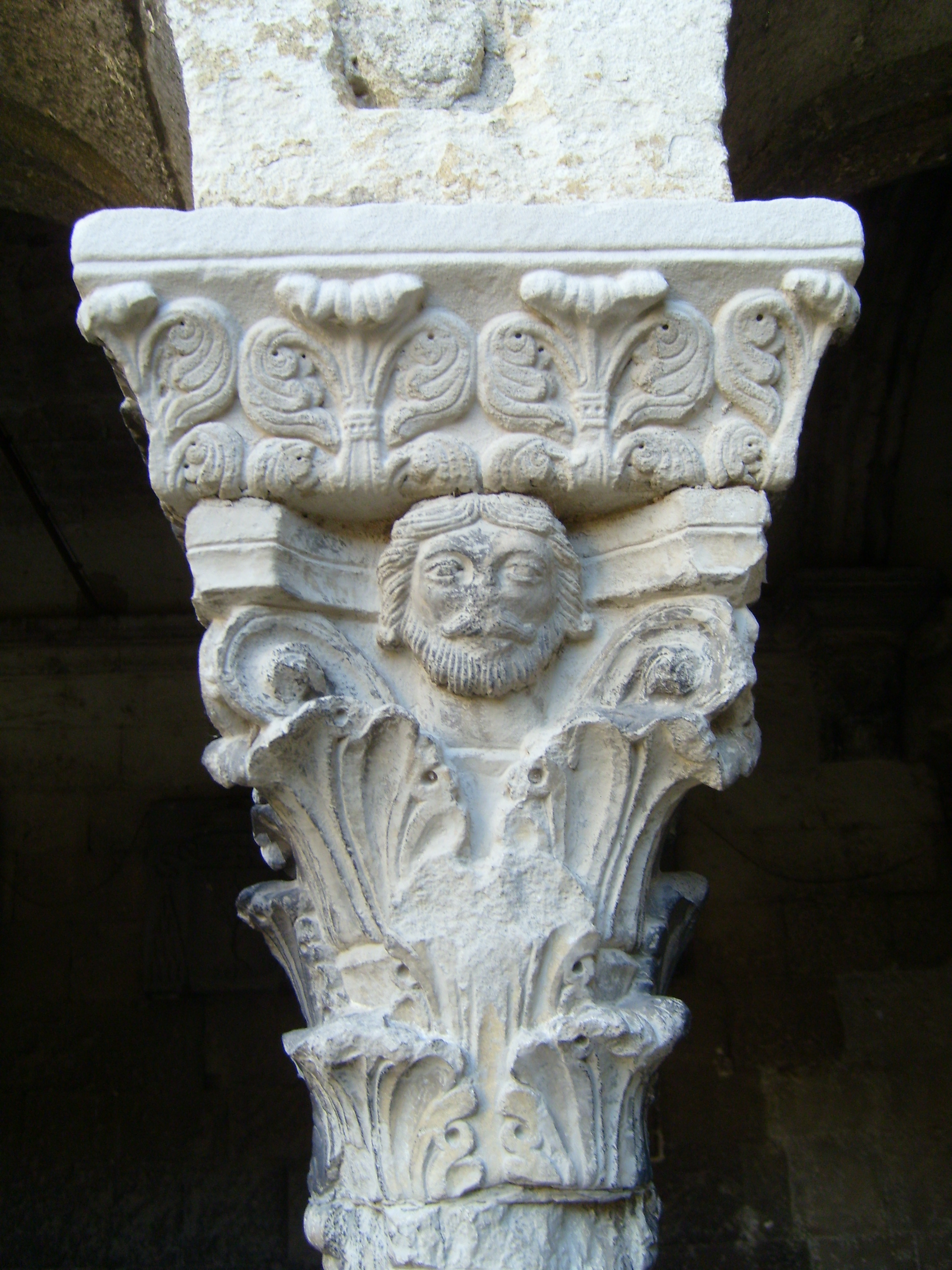
Cloister column capital with face

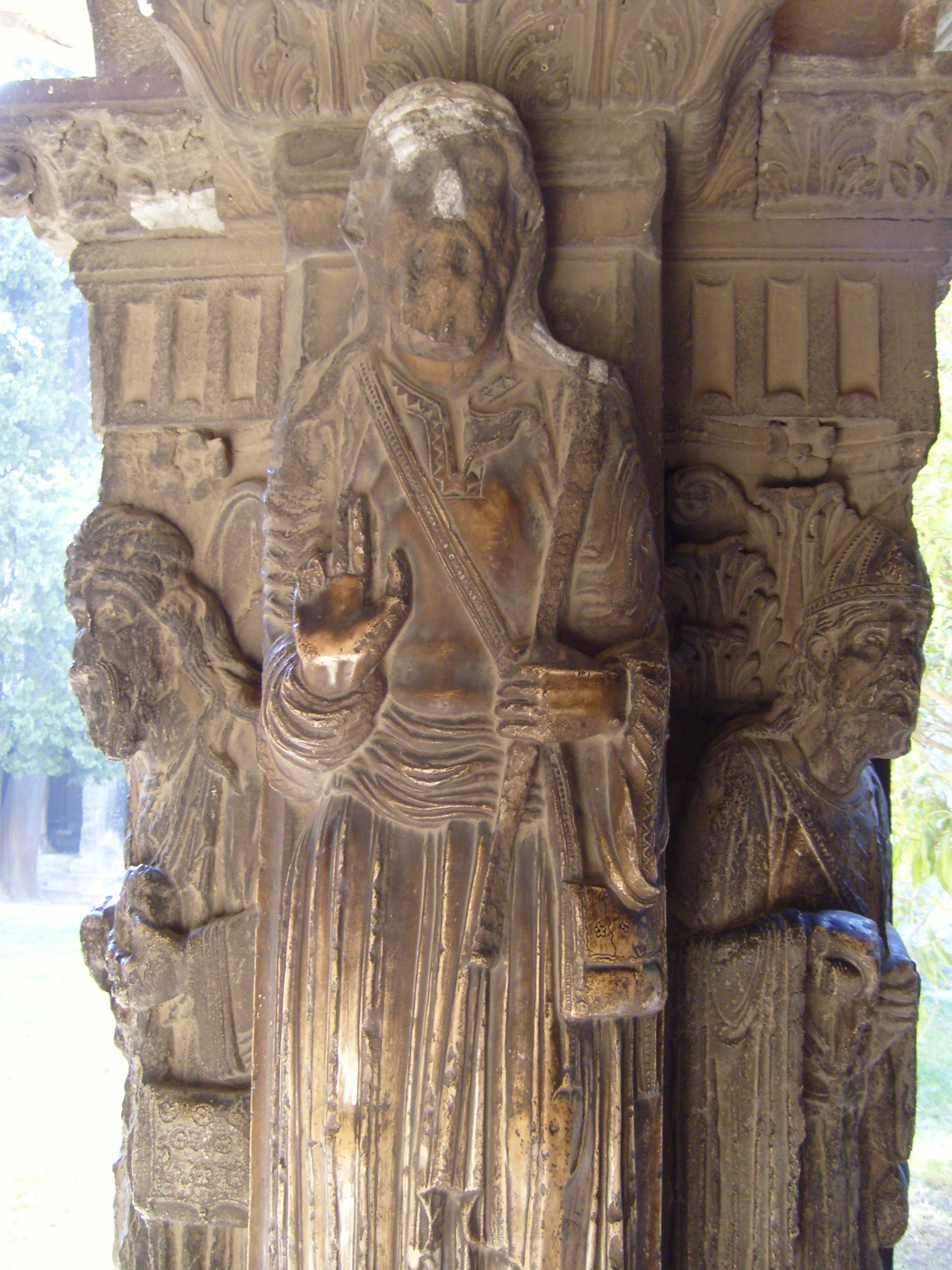
Cloister column with carving of St. Trophimus, (north gallery)

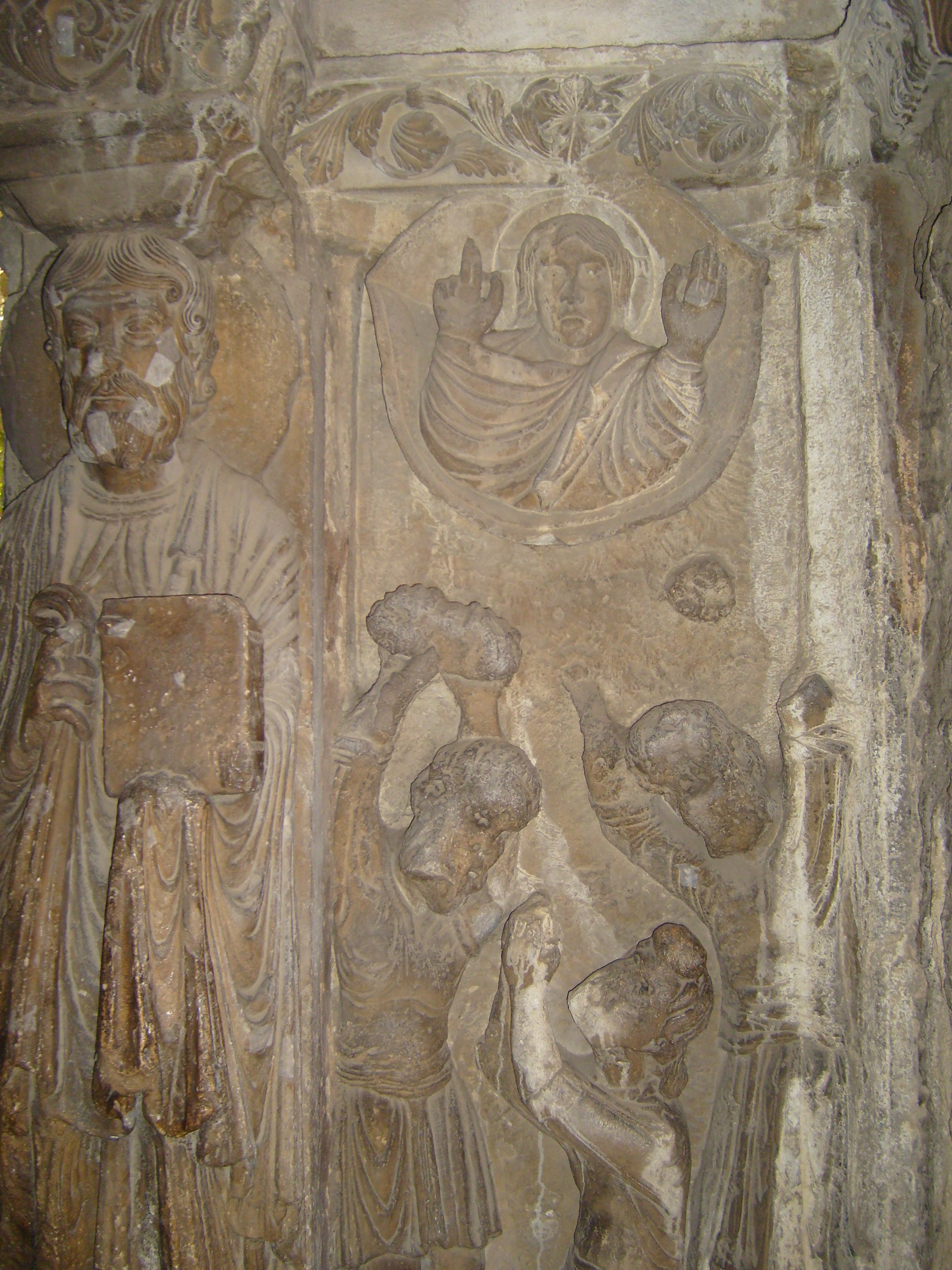
Cloister column showing the stoning of St. Stephen

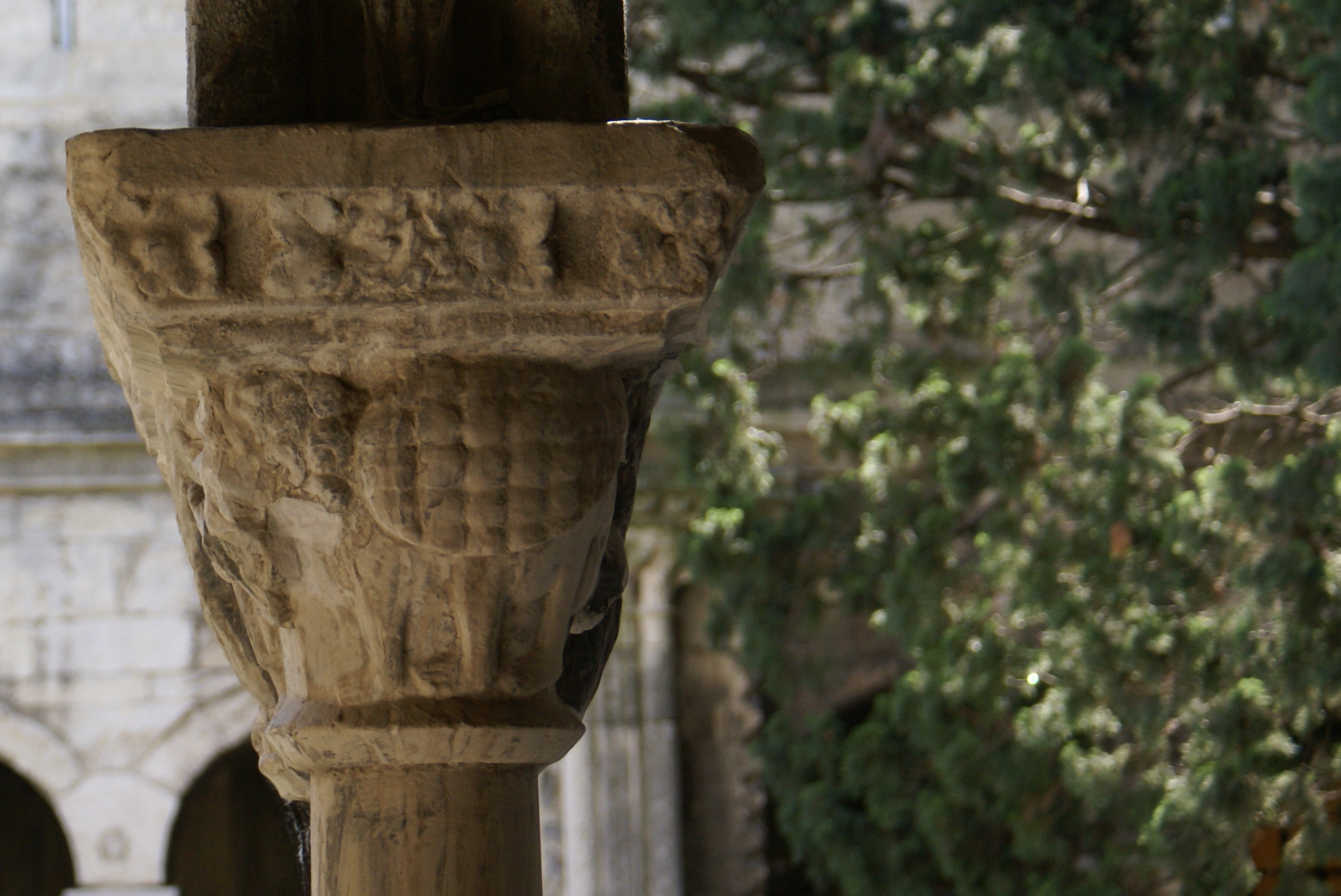
Cloister capital in West Gallery depicting the mythical Tarasque beast of Provence
