= John Michael Drexler =

American businessman and politician

1941 portrait of Drexler

John Michael Drexler (September 29, 1905 – June 30, 1970) was an American businessman and politician.

Drexler was born in Saint Paul, Minnesota. He graduated from Cretin High School in Saint Paul, Minnesota and went to Globe Business College. Drexler lived in Saint Paul, Minnesota and was a businessman. He served in the Minnesota House of Representatives from 1939 to 1944.
