= Shukran Hussein Gure =

Kenyan politician

Shukran Gure
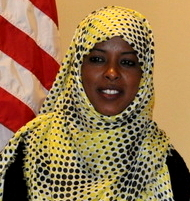

Member of the National Assembly of Kenya
- In office March 2013 – August 2017

Personal details
- Born: 6 June 1978 (age 48)
- Party: Wiper Democratic Movement
- Education: College of St. Catherine
- Profession: Politician

Shukran Hussein Gure (Somali: Shukraan Xuseen Gurey) (born 6 June 1978) is a Kenyan politician. She hails from the Auliyahan subdivision of the Somali Ogaden Darod clan. Gure is a Member of the Kenyan Parliament representing the Garissa County. She was elected to the position in March 2013 on a Wiper Democratic Movement ticket. She is of Somali ethnicity.
