= St. Catherine University =

Catholic university in Saint Paul, Minnesota, US

- Former names: College of St. Catherine (1905–2009); St. Mary's School of Nursing (1887–1964); St. Mary's Junior College (1964–1985)
- Type: Private university
- Established: 1905; 121 years ago
- Religious affiliation: Roman Catholic
- Academic affiliations: ACCU; CIC; WCC; Space-grant
- Endowment: $74.8 million (2016)
- Budget: $128.3 million (2016)
- President: Marcheta P. Evans, PhD
- Faculty: 340
- Students: 3,699
- Undergraduates: 2,602
- Postgraduates: 1,097
- Location: Saint Paul, Minnesota, U.S. 44°55′29″N 93°10′56″W
- Campus: Urban
- Colors: Purple and gold
- Nickname: Wildcats
- Sporting affiliations: NCAA Division III – MIAC
- Mascot: A Wildcat
- Website: stkate.edu
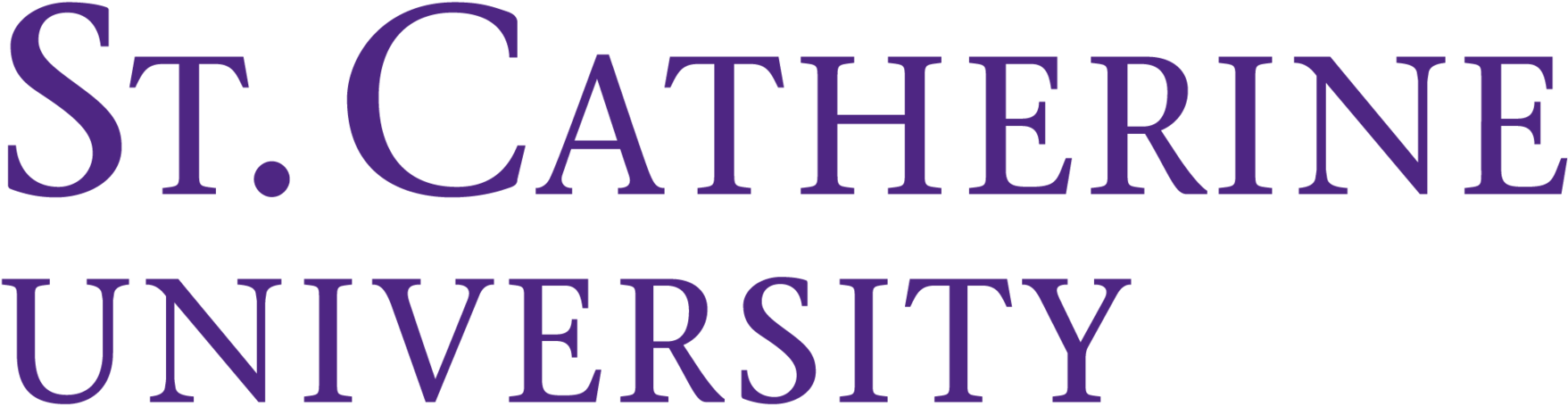

St. Catherine University (St. Kate's) is a private Catholic university in Saint Paul, Minnesota, United States. It was established as one of the first institutions of higher learning specifically for women in the Midwest and was known as the College of St. Catherine until 2009. St. Kate's offers baccalaureate programs for women as well as graduate and associate programs for women and men.

The university averages an enrollment of about 3,700 students annually. It focuses on recruiting and enrolling minority students and non-traditional aged students. St. Catherine's Weekend College—now College for Adults—was the second such program in the nation and the first in the Upper Midwest. St. Kate's was also the first private college in the nation to launch an effort to attract, welcome, and retain Hmong students, making it home to one of the largest populations of Hmong scholars in the nation.

== History ==
=== Founders ===
St. Catherine University was founded as the College of St. Catherine in 1905 by the Sisters of St. Joseph of Carondelet under the leadership of Mother Seraphine Ireland. The university is named after St. Catherine of Alexandria, the fourth-century Egyptian lay philosopher who suffered martyrdom for her faith.

A site for St. Kate's was chosen atop the city's second-highest hill in St. Paul in the area now known as Highland Park. Hugh Derham of Rosemount contributed $20,000 for the first building. Derham Hall opened in January 1905, offering classes to high school boarding students and lower-division college students. The high school eventually moved to its own campus and merged with the Lasallian-run Cretin High School to form Cretin-Derham Hall High School in 1987. Upper-division courses were first offered in the academic year of 1911–12. In spring 1913, Bachelor of Arts degrees were conferred on the first two students to complete four years at the new institution. In 1917, St. Kate's earned full accreditation from the North Central Association of Colleges and Schools.

During World War II, St. Kate's responded to a critical nursing shortage by expanding its programs to include a baccalaureate degree in nursing and assuming leadership of the St. Joseph's and St. Mary's hospitals and schools of nursing and partnering with the U.S. Cadet Nursing Corps to provide students with financial assistance in exchange for nursing services. More than 170 St. Catherine alumnae served in military hospitals between 1942 and 1948.

Prior to the 1970s, students often took classes at the nearby University of St. Thomas, which was at the time a men's college.

=== Expansion to Minneapolis ===
The St. Paul campus is the location for most day, evening/weekend, and graduate program classes, with 110 wooded acres in the Highland Park neighborhood, a central location between the Twin Cities' downtowns. St. Kate's coeducational Minneapolis campus in the Riverside neighborhood offered associate degree and certificate programs in numerous healthcare fields. In 1887, the Sisters of St. Joseph responded to a need for trained nurses in the region founding the "St. Mary's School of Nursing" at St. Mary's Hospital in Minneapolis. Student nurses in the three year Registered Nurse program lived in a dormitory at the hospital while studying first year academics at the College of St. Catherine. In 1964, the hospital program was expanded and opened under the title "St. Mary's Junior College". St. Mary's offered associate degrees in healthcare, including the first occupational therapy assistant program and the first physical therapist assistant program in the United States. St. Kate's acquired St. Mary's Junior College in 1985. In 1987, Fairview Hospital combined with St. Mary's Hospital to become Riverside Medical Center. In 2019, St. Catherine University sold the Minneapolis campus and moved all Minneapolis campus programs and staff to the St. Paul campus the following year.

=== Move to University ===
On June 1, 2009, the College of St. Catherine changed its name to St. Catherine University.

=== National Register of Historic Places ===
Derham Hall and Our Lady of Victory Chapel are co-listed on the National Register of Historic Places.

=== St. Kate's Presidents ===
St. Catherine's University has had twelve presidents over its history.

- Marcheta P. Evans, (2024–Present)
- ReBecca (Becky) Koenig Roloff '76, MBA; 2016–2024
- Andrea J. Lee; 1998–2016
- Anita M. Pampusch; 1985–1997
- Catherine T. McNamee; 1979–1984
- Alberta M. Huber; 1964–1979
- Mary Edward Healy; 1961–1964
- Mary William Brady; 1955–1961
- Antonine O'Brien; 1949–1955
- Antonius Kennelly; 1943–1949
- Eucharista Galvin; 1937–1943
- Antonia McHugh; 1919–1937

== Organization ==
=== Schools and colleges ===
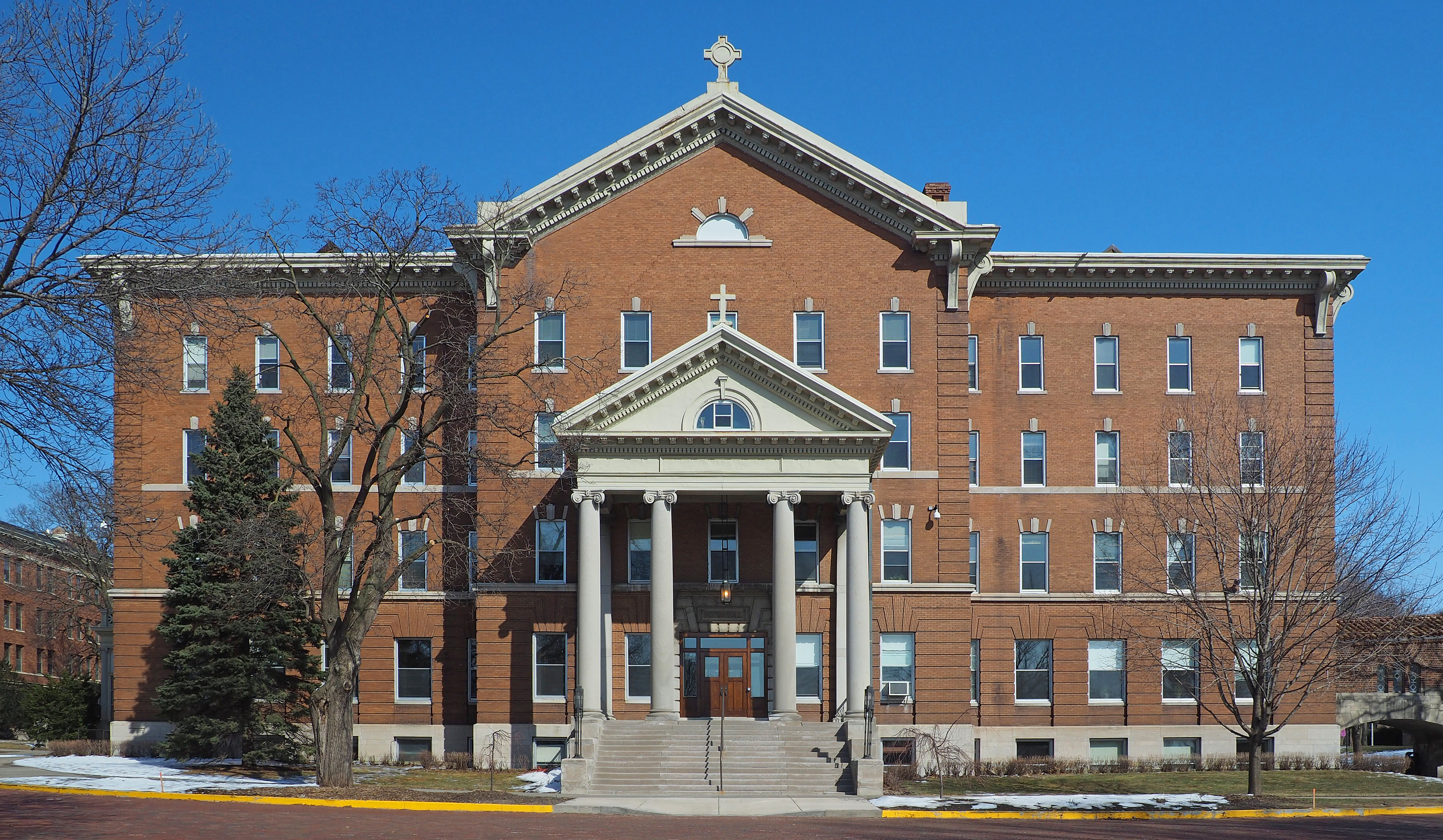
Derham Hall

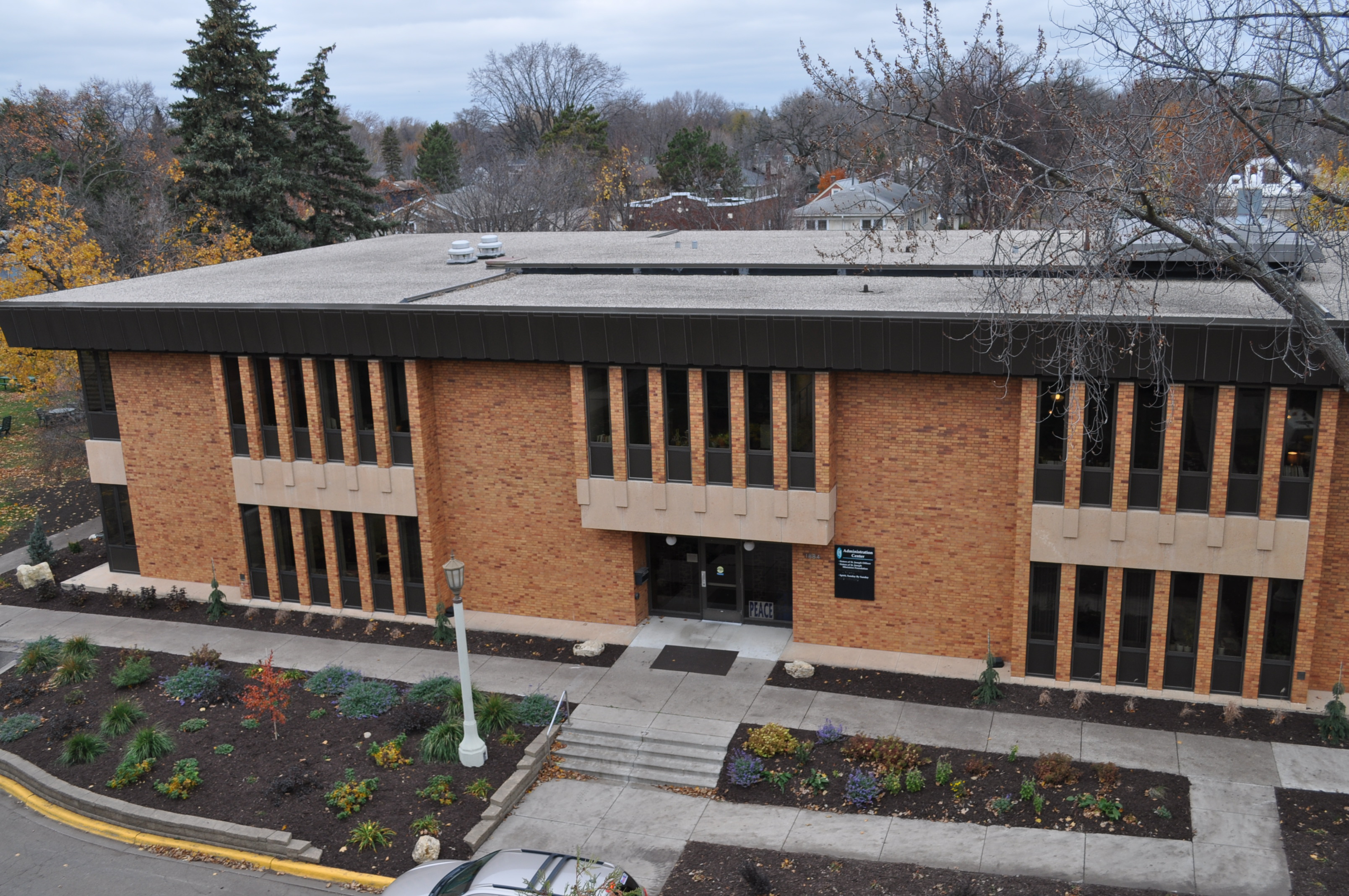
CSJ Administration Center

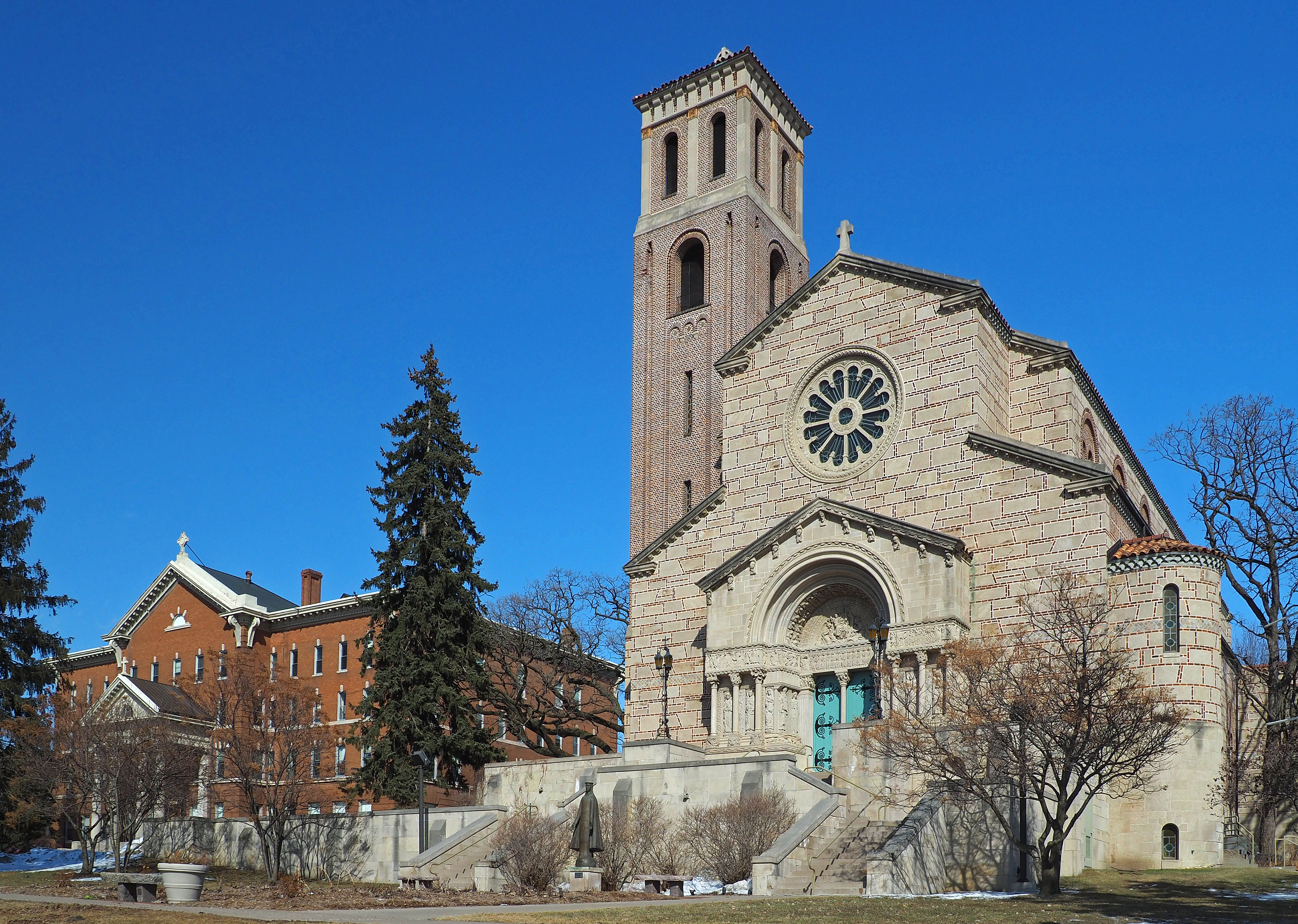
Our Lady of Victory Chapel

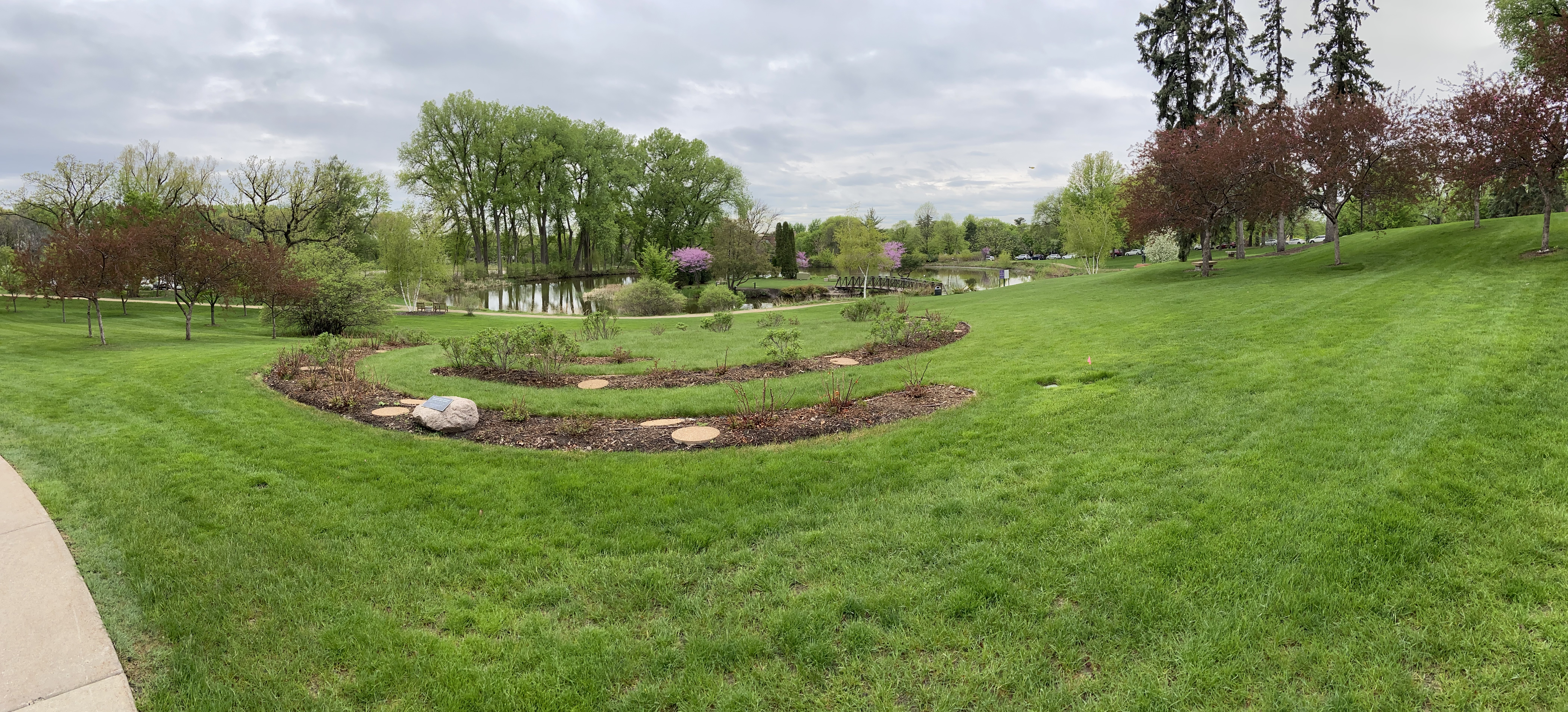
Dewdrop Pond

At St. Catherine University, students enroll in one of three colleges:

- The College for Women
- The Graduate College
- The College for Adults

Students pursue their majors or programs of study through four discipline-based schools:

- School of Humanities, Arts, and Sciences
- School of Business
- Henrietta Schmoll School of Health Sciences
- School of Nursing

Collectively, the schools host more than 100 fields of study, many of which are available in both traditional day and nontraditional hybrid (evening, weekend and online) formats. St. Kate's also has nearly 60 baccalaureate majors, plus another 35 or so through the Associated Colleges of the Twin Cities, as well as dozens of minors and nine pre-professional programs.

=== Partnerships ===
St. Kate's is a member of the Associated Colleges of the Twin Cities (ACTC), a consortium of five private liberal arts colleges located in Minneapolis or St. Paul. The partnership allows students to take classes or complete a major at any one of the other colleges. The university also partners with 900 clinical training sites to make clinical education meaningful and relevant to St. Kate's students. Partner organizations include Allina Health System, Fairview Health Services, HealthEast Care System and HealthPartners.

In the fall of 2011, St. Kate's became the first university in Minnesota to partner with the Paul D. Coverdell Fellows Program (formerly known as the Peace Corps Fellows/ USA program) to offer Peace Corps volunteers a fellowship to earn a Master of Arts in Organizational Leadership (MAOL).

=== Endowed Mission Chairs ===
Unlike many colleges and universities that have established separate departments for Catholic studies, liberal arts and women's studies, St. Catherine University has established three distinguished chairs:

- Endowed Chair in Catholic Identity
- Endowed Chair in Women's Education
- Endowed Chair in the Liberal Arts

Each position is supported by endowed funds and a program endowment. The distinguished chairs will work as a team to:

- Initiate, plan and oversee faculty and staff development programming;
- Fund faculty and staff work focused on integrating the mission into syllabi, program
- Requirements and co-curricular activities;
- Purchase relevant library holdings and other materials;
- Serve as faculty resources, especially for visiting classes, recruiting speakers and planning workshops.

== Academics ==
The student/faculty ratio is 10:1. The average class size is 18 in the traditional/day program, 13 in the College for Adults, bachelor's program and 16 in the College for Adults, associate program.

In addition to taking courses directly related to their chosen majors, baccalaureate students are required to complete one or two additional courses in the arts, humanities and sciences to meet the university's liberal arts requirements.

=== Online OTA program ===
In 2014, St. Catherine University expanded its Occupational Therapy Assistant program to offer a blended learning option. Starting in Virginia, and then expanding to California and Texas, the Online OTA program features 80% online and 20% onsite curriculum, including skills labs and fieldwork experiences.

=== Research and academic centers ===
St. Catherine University offers opportunities for faculty-student research and mentoring through department and grant-funded initiatives—as well as through these programs and national centers:

- Assistantship Mentoring Program (AMP) — paid teaching, research, and program assistantships in this program .
- Mayo Innovation Scholars program — This program brings together baccalaureate students from a variety of disciplines to research Mayo Clinic invention ideas and create business plans for a medical product. Graduate students from St. Catherine's Master of Arts in Organizational Leadership program serve as mentors to student teams.
- WHIR Center — The Women's Health Integrative Research (WHIR) Center is a laboratory devoted to interdisciplinary research on women's health. In addition to motion-tracking equipment—such as a 3-D electromagnetic motion system, a metabolic measurement unit and a heart-rate monitoring system—WHIR also has a wet lab that supports the processing and storage of human blood and saliva samples. WHIR also functions as a ladder between degree programs in disciplines such as nursing, where students from two-year associate degree programs work alongside students earning their four-year or graduate degrees.
- CATIE Center — St. Catherine University established the CATIE Center in 2005 as the Collaborative for the Advancement of Teaching Excellence. It is one of the six centers working in partnership as the National Consortium of Interpreter Education Centers. The CATIE Center offers resources and programs such as the Body Language online modules, ASL Immersion, Deaf Mentor Training, and Interpreting for Deaf-Blind Mentorship for students and working professionals. The center hosts the National Symposium on Healthcare Interpreting, drawing more than 150 interpreters to St. Kate's each year.
- National Center for STEM Elementary Education — This center houses outreach programs and services related to fostering interest and skill in science, technology, engineering and mathematics (STEM) among students as young as fourth grade.
- Human Anatomy Lab — St. Kate's is home to the second largest collegiate anatomy lab in the state. The 3,600-square-foot space includes two labs—each one large enough to accommodate nine bodies—plus showers, lockers, storage units and a cleaning room. At least eight different academic programs use the lab, including orthoptics (undergraduate), physician assistant studies (master's) and physical therapy (doctoral studies). A religious service is held at the start of each semester to help students express gratitude for the generosity of their "silent teachers". John C. Nienstedt, Archbishop of Saint Paul and Minneapolis, blessed the lab on September 19, 2011.

=== Honors programs ===
First-year students or sophomores who have achieved at least a 3.5 GPA are eligible to apply for the St. Catherine University's Antonian Scholars program for promising learners, leaders, researchers, writers, performers, and creative thinkers. Antonian Scholars are required to complete an independent creative project during senior year. There are a total of 25 different Honor Societies.

=== Study abroad programs ===
St. Catherine University offers more than 150 study abroad options in 50 countries, ranging in length from January term to yearlong. More than 200 St. Kate's students study abroad each year.

== Student life ==
=== Residence life ===
Seventy percent of St. Catherine's first-year students live in eight residence halls on campus. Students have access to computer labs in the halls and resident advisors (RAs) who provide ongoing support, guidance, and social activities. Each year, the university offers learning communities in some residence halls.

=== Clubs and organizations ===
St. Catherine University has more than 50 student organizations, including Student Senate, intramural sports, and a women's choir. Students can work on two student publications, "The Wheel" and "Ariston".

=== Art and archives ===
St. Catherine University's fine art collection dates back to St. Kate's founding in 1905. Today, more than 1,000 pieces comprise the collection. Among them are works on paper—prints (etchings, engravings, woodcuts, lithographs and silkscreens), watercolors and drawings—as well as paintings and sculpture by artists of different nationalities and periods, including:

- Corita Kent, one of America's most influential graphic design artists of the 20th century.
- Adolf Dehn, who helped define regionalism and caricature in American art.
- Clair Mairs, featured in Pioneer Modernists: Minnesota's First Generation of Women Artists.
- Giovanni Piranesi, one of the most prolific printmakers of the 18th century.
- Ade Bethune, who made unique contributions during the 20th century to the field of sacred art and architecture as an artist, writer and liturgical consultant.

In addition to paper files, the St. Catherine University archives contains more than 8,000 photographs and 4,500 artifacts. The archives contain artifacts from before the Christian era and from the early days of printing, including a Heritage Edition of The Saint John's Bible.

The university also houses the Catherine G. Murphy Gallery which hosts art exhibitions, programming, and the university's art collection. The gallery seeks to "maintain a powerful women-centered presence in the local and regional arts communities."

== Athletics ==
St. Catherine athletics wordmark

St. Catherine athletic teams are the Wildcats. The university is a member of the Division III level of the National Collegiate Athletic Association (NCAA), primarily competing in the Minnesota Intercollegiate Athletic Conference (MIAC) since the 1983–84 academic year.

St. Catherine competes in 11 intercollegiate varsity sports: Women's sports include basketball, cross country, dance, golf, ice hockey, soccer, softball, swimming & diving, tennis, track & field and volleyball. Club and recreational sports include aerobics, volleyball, basketball, soccer, tennis and rock climbing.

=== Facilities ===
Remodeled in 2015, the Aimee and Patrick Butler Center for Sports and Fitness at St. Kate's is a women-oriented sports center, complete with an eight-lane swimming pool, weight room, suspended jogging track, spa and sauna. The benefits for student athletes are emerging at the university's Women's Health Integrative Research (WHIR) Center. WHIR's equipment can establish baseline performance measurements and track athletic improvement over time.

== Notable alumni ==
- Zaynab Abdi '20 - Immigration advocate
- Jeanne Arth '56 - U.S. tennis player; Wimbledon women's doubles champion
- Kelly Barnhill '96 - Newbery Award and Nebula Award-winning author
- Heather M. Hodges '68 - Former U.S. ambassador to Ecuador and Moldova
- Shukran Hussein Gure - Somali politician; MP in the Parliament of Kenya
- Arleen McCarty Hynes - Benedictine sister who pioneered bibliotherapy
- Carol Ronning Kapsner '69 - Supreme court justice, State of North Dakota
- Betty McCollum '76 - U.S. congresswoman
- Mary Jo McGuire '78 - Minnesota state senator and former Minnesota state representative
- Anne McKeig '89 - Associate justice, Minnesota Supreme Court
- Tiffany Stratton (ring name of Jessica Lynn Woynilko '21) - Professional wrestler signed to WWE; one-time WWE Women's Champion and one-time NXT Women's Champion
- Helen Vanni (née Spaeth) '46 - Opera singer who performed with the Metropolitan Opera, Santa Fe Opera, and other companies
- Nancy Youngblut '75 - Played Kolana in Star Trek: Deep Space Nine and Scarlet Forest in ABC's One Life to Live

== See also ==
- List of colleges and universities in Minnesota
- Higher education in Minnesota
