= David Housewright =

American novelist

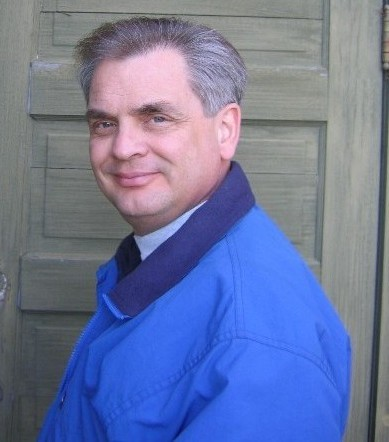
- Housewright publicity still taken by Renee Valois
- Born: February 7, 1955 (age 71); Saint Paul, Minnesota, U.S.
- Education: University of St. Thomas
- Occupations: Novelist, freelance writer
- Writing career
- Genres: Crime fiction, mystery fiction
- Notable works: Penance, Practice To Deceive, Jelly's Gold, Curse of the Jade Lily
- Website: www.davidhousewright.com

David Housewright (born February 7, 1955) is an Edgar Award-winning author of crime fiction and past President of the Private Eye Writers of America best known for his Holland Taylor and Rushmore McKenzie detective novels as well as other tales of murder and mayhem in the Midwest. Housewright won the Edgar from the Mystery Writers of America as well as a nomination from the PWA for his first novel "Penance." He has also earned three Minnesota Book Awards. Most of his novels take place in and around the greater St. Paul and Minneapolis area of Minnesota, USA and have been favorably compared to Raymond Chandler, Ross MacDonald and Robert B. Parker.

== Biography ==
Housewright was born and raised in Saint Paul, Minnesota. He is the son of Eugene Housewright Sr., a businessman, and Patricia Langevin Housewright. He attended Cretin High School, where he was editor of the school newspaper until he was fired for printing an editorial opposing the Vietnam War. “I attended an all-boys Catholic military school during the height of Vietnam war. Of course they fired me. You would have fired me, too,” Housewright told the Wild River Review. He earned a degree in journalism from the University of St. Thomas. He now lives with his wife, writer and theater critic Renee Marie Valois, in Roseville, Minnesota.

== Career ==
=== Literary career ===
Housewright's first book, Penance (1995), which introduced detective Holland Taylor, won the 1996 Edgar Award for Best First Novel from the Mystery Writers of America and was short listed for a Shamus Award from the Private Eye Writers of America. The second book in the series, Practice to Deceive (1997) won the 1998 Minnesota Book Award. In 2004, he introduced unlicensed P.I. Rushmore McKenzie with A Hard Ticket Home. The sixth novel in the series, Jelly’s Gold (2009) also won the Minnesota Book Award, as did Curse of the Jade Lily (2013). Tin City (2004), The Taking of Libbie, SD (2010), Stealing the Countess (2017) and From The Grace (2021) were also nominated for the same prize. In 2012, Housewright released two stand-alone novels – The Devil and the Diva (written with Renee Valois) – a 2013 Minnesota Book Award nominee – and a young adult crime novel entitled Finders Keepers. He was elected President of the Private Eye Writers of America in June, 2014. That same year the Minnesota Historical Society and The Friends of the Saint Paul Public Library added Housewright's name and face to Minnesota Writers on the Map, joining accomplished writers Sinclair Lewis, F. Scott Fitzgerald, Maud Hart Lovelace, Laura Ingalls Wilder, August Wilson, Louise Erdrich, William Kent Krueger and Charles M. Schulz.

=== Advertising career ===
Before starting a career as a novelist, Housewright worked as a copywriter and creative director for Twin Cities advertising agencies such as Kamstra Communications, DBK&O, Blaisdell & Westlie and his own shop Gerber-Housewright, as well as Andersen Windows. His clients included Federal Express, 3M, Hormel Foods, Tony's Pizza, Jim Beam, the California Institute of Technology, Champion Batteries, and Partnership for a Drug-Free America. His work has been cited for a number of industry awards including the CLIO, One Show, Communication Arts, The Show, Silver Microphone, Telly, Olivers, Pro-Comm, ACE, IABC, ARC, ECHO, and NAMA and has been featured in ADWEEK, Archive and ADS magazines.

=== Journalism career ===
Housewright honed his research, interviewing, writing and editing skills while working as a news and sports reporter for the Owatonna People’s Press (summer internship), Minneapolis Tribune, Albert Lea (MN) Evening Tribune and the Grand Forks (ND) Herald. His articles have also appeared in publications such as Format Magazine, ADWEEK, Crimespree Magazine and The History Channel Magazine..

=== Teaching career ===
Housewright's success as a novelist led to an invitation to teach a course on the Modern American Mystery Novel at the University of Minnesota. He frequently works as a writing instructor for the Loft Literary Center in Minneapolis, Minnesota where he teaches a course on novel writing.

== Works ==
=== Holland Taylor series ===
1. Penance (1995 Foul Play Play Press) – Edgar Award Winner Best First Novel from Mystery Writers of America, Shamus nominee Private Eye Writers of America
2. Practice to Deceive (1997 Foul Play Press) – 1998 Minnesota Book Award winner
3. Dearly Departed (1999 W. W. Norton)
4. Darkness, Sing Me a Song (2018 St. Martin's Minotaur Books)
5. First, Kill the Lawyers (2019 St. Martin's Minotaur Books)
6. Girl In A Dumpster (Down & Out Books)

=== Rushmore McKenzie series ===
1. A Hard Ticket Home (2004 St. Martin's Press)
2. Tin City (2005 St. Martin's Press) – 2006 Minnesota Book Award nominee
3. Pretty Girl Gone – (2006 St. Martin's Minotaur Books)
4. Dead Boyfriends (2007 St. Martin's Minotaur Books)
5. Madman On A Drum (2008 St. Martin's Minotaur Books)
6. Jelly's Gold (2009 St. Martin's Minotaur Books) – 2010 Minnesota Book Award winner
7. The Taking of Libbie, SD (2010 St. Martin's Minotaur Books) – 2011 Minnesota Book Award nominee
8. Highway 61 (2011 St. Martin's Minotaur Books)
9. Curse of the Jade Lily (2012 St. Martin's Minotaur Books) – 2013 Minnesota Book Award winner
10. The Last Kind Word (2013 St. Martin's Minotaur Books)
11. The Devil May Care (2014 St. Martin's Minotaur Books)
12. Unidentified Woman #15 (2015 St. Martin's Minotaur Books)
13. Stealing the Countess (2016 St. Martin's Minotaur Books) - 2017 Minnesota Book Award nominee
14. What the Dead Leave Behind (2017 St. Martin's Minotaur Books)
15. Like To Die (2018 St. Martin's Minotaur Books)
16. Dead Man's Mistress (2019 St. Martin's Minotaur Books)
17. From the Grave (2020 St. Martin's Minotaur Books) - 2021 Minnesota Book Award Nominee
18. What Doesn't Kill Us (2021 St. Martin's Minotaur Books)
19. Something Wicked (2022 St. Martin's Minotaur Books)
20. In a Hard Wind (2023 St. Martin's Minotaur Books)
21. Man in the Water (2024 St. Martin's Minotaur Books)
22. Them Bones (2025 St. Martin's Minotaur Books)
23. Fear The Reaper (2026 St. Martin's Minotaur Books)

=== Stand-alone novels ===
- The Devil and the Diva (2012 Down & Out Books) – written with Renee Valois – 2013 Minnesota Book Award nominee
- Finders Keepers (2012 Down & Out Books)
- Dracula Wine (a "Grifter's Song" saga, 2022 Down & Out Books)
- Full House (a volume of short stories, Down & Out Books)

=== Short stories ===
- "Kids Today" (Ellery Queen Mystery Magazine, July 1999)
- "How To Trick Any Woman Into Having Sex (aka The Sultan of Seduction)," True Romance Magazine, April 1999)
- "A Domestic Matter" (The Silence of the Loons, 2005 Nodin Press)
- "Mai-Nu’s Window" (Twin Cities Noir, 2006 Akashic Books)
- "Miss Behavin’" (Resort to Murder, 2007 Nodin Press)
- "Last Laugh" (Once Upon A Crime, 2009 Nodin Press)
- "Time of Death" (Deadly Treats, 2011 Nodin Press)
- "Obsessive Behavior" (Writes of Spring, 2012 Nodin Press)
- "A Turn of the Card" (Fifteen Tales of Murder, Mayhem and Malice From the Land of Minnesota Nice (2012 Nodin Press)
