= Kemp (surname) =

Kemp is a surname of English, Scottish, German and Dutch origin which means "soldier". Notable people with the surname include:

- Adrienne W. Kemp (1930–2022), British statistician
- Agnes Kemp (1823–1908), American physician and temperance movement leader
- Albert Edward Kemp (1858–1929), Canadian businessman and politician
- Annerose Kemp (1936–2013), German pedagogue
- Amelia Kemp, English footballer
- Anthony Kemp (actor) (born 1954), British actor
- Anthony Kemp (historian) (1939–2018), English military historian
- Anthony Fenn Kemp (1773–1868), Australian soldier and merchant
- Arthur Kemp (born 1962), South African/British politician and writer
- Barbara Kemp (1881–1959), German opera singer
- Barry Kemp (Egyptologist) (1940–2024), English archaeologist and Egyptologist
- Bolivar E. Kemp (1871–1933), Louisiana congressman
- Bolivar Edwards Kemp Jr. (1904–1965), Louisiana Attorney General, 1948–1952
- Brandis Kemp (1944–2020), American actress
- Brian Kemp (born 1963), governor of Georgia (US)
- Carlo Kemp (born 1998), American football player
- Dave Kemp (born 1953), English footballer and football manager
- David Kemp (disambiguation), several people
- Davie Kemp (born 1950), Scottish footballer
- Earl Kemp (1929–2020), American science fiction editor and critic
- Edward Kemp (landscape architect) (1817–1891), English garden designer and author
- Edward Kemp (playwright) (born 1965), English playwright and theatre director, director of RADA
- Elise Kemp (1881–1917), New Zealand born nurse and nursing sister
- Eric Kemp (1915–2009), Bishop of Chichester
- Gary Kemp (born 1959), English pop musician
- Gene Kemp (1926–2015), British author
- George Kemp, 1st Baron Rochdale (1866–1945), British politician, soldier and businessman
- George Hubert Kemp (1897–1918), British soldier
- George Meikle Kemp (1795–1844), Scottish carpenter, draughtsman and architect
- Gilbert Kemp, English footballer
- Hal Kemp (1904–1940), American jazz alto saxophonist, clarinetist, bandleader, composer, and arranger
- Harry Kemp (1883–1960), American poet and prose writer
- Haydn Kemp (1897–1982), English footballer
- C. Henry Kempe (1922–1984), American pediatrician who identified battered child syndrome
- Jack Kemp (1935–2009), American politician and football quarterback
- James Kemp (missionary) (1797–1872), British missionary to New Zealand
- James Furman Kemp (1859–1926), American geologist
- Jan Kemp (disambiguation), several people
- Jeka Kemp (1876–1966), Scottish artist
- Jennie Murray Kemp (1858–1928), American temperance activist
- Jennifer Kemp (born 1955), American swimmer
- Jeremy Kemp (1935–2019), English actor
- John Kemp (disambiguation), several people
- Johnny Kemp (1959–2015), Bahamian singer, songwriter, and record producer
- Jonathan Kemp (born 1981), English squash player
- Joseph Kemp (minister) (1872–1933), English-born New Zealand Baptist minister and preacher
- Joseph Kemp (organist), English composer and organist
- Sir Joseph Horsford Kemp, Chief Justice of Hong Kong
- Sir Kenneth Hagar Kemp, 12th Baronet (1853–1936), British soldier, lawyer, landowner and cricketer
- Kirsten Kemp (born 1970), English actress and television presenter
- Lindsay Kemp (1938–2018), British dancer, actor, teacher, mime artist and choreographer
- Maida Springer Kemp (1910–2005), American labor organizer
- Martin Kemp (born 1961), English actor and musician
- Martin Kemp (art historian) (born 1942), British art historian and professor
- Martine Kemp (born 1994), Luxembourgian politician
- Matt Kemp (born 1984), American baseball outfielder
- Matthew Kemp (soccer) (born 1980), Australian footballer
- Mathew Kemp (died 1682), Virginia colonial politician, Speaker of the Virginia House of Burgesses
- Maurice Kemp (born 1991), American basketball player in the Israeli Basketball Premier League
- Otto Kemp (born 1999), American baseball player
- Paul Kemp (actor) (1896–1953), German actor
- Penn Kemp (born 1944), Canadian writer
- Peter Kemp (rower) (1853–1951), Australian sculler
- Peter Kemp (swimmer) (1877–1965), British swimmer
- Philip Kemp (born 1999), American ice hockey player
- RaShaun Kemp, American politician
- Richard Kemp (born 1959), British army officer
- Richard Kemp (politician), British politician in Liverpool
- Rick Kemp (born 1941), English musician
- Robert S. Kemp, American professor of commerce
- Rod Kemp (born 1944), Australian politician
- Roman Kemp (born 1993), English radio host
- Rose Kemp (born 1984), English singer and guitarist
- Ross Kemp (born 1964), English actor and journalist
- Sally Kemp (1933-2017), American actress, known for Spellbinder
- Shawn Kemp (born 1969), American basketball player
- Stacey Kemp (born 1988), English pair skater
- Steve Kemp (baseball) (born 1954), American baseball player
- Steve Kemp (musician) (born 1978), English rock drummer
- Takutai Tarsh Kemp (1975–2025), New Zealand politician, community health leader and hip hop dance director
- Tara Kemp (born 1964), American singer
- Thomas Read Kemp (1783–1844), English property developer and politician
- Tony Kemp (baseball) (born 1991), American baseball player
- Tony Kemp (nurse), English nurse
- Tony Kemp (rugby league) (born 1968), New Zealand rugby league footballer and coach
- Travis Kemp (1914–1995), British dancer and choreographer
- Troy Kemp (born 1966), Bahamas high jumper
- Ursula Kemp (c.1525–1582), English cunning woman and midwife
- William Kempe (c.1560-c.1603), original Shakespeare actor, known as Will Kemp
- Willie Kemp (1888–1965), Scottish singer and writer
- Willy Kemp (1925–2021), Luxembourgian professional road bicycle racer

== See also ==
- Te Keepa Te Rangihiwinui, a Māori soldier whose name was often anglicised to "Major Kemp"
- Kemp (disambiguation)
- Kempe (disambiguation)
