= Chem =

Chem may refer to:

- Chemistry
- Chemical
- Chem (journal), a scientific journal published by Cell Press
- Post apocalyptic slang for "drugs", medicinal or otherwise in the Fallout video game series.

In Ancient Egyptian usage:

- Khem (also spelt Chem), the Egyptian word for "black"
- Min (god), in the past erroneously named Khem

CHEM may refer to:

- A metabolic panel: for instance, CHEM-7, which is the basic metabolic panel
- CHEM-DT, a Canadian television channel

== See also ==
- Chemo (disambiguation)
- Kem (disambiguation)
- Kemi, a place in Finland
