= Kempe =

Kempe may refer to:

- Kempe baronets, a title in the Baronetage of England
- Kempe chain, part of the four-colour theorem
- Kempe Fjord, King Christian X Land, Greenland
- Kempe Glacier, Antarctica
- Kempe Hill, former name of Camp Hill, West Midlands, England

== People with the surname ==
- Adrian Kempe (born 1996), Swedish ice hockey player
- Alfred Kempe (1849–1922), English mathematician
- Arnold E. Kempe (born 1927), American lawyer and politician
- Carl Kempe (1884–1967), Swedish paper producer
- Charles Eamer Kempe (1837–1907), English stained glass designer
- C. Henry Kempe (1922–1984), American pediatrician who was the first to identify and recognize child abuse
- Kempe Gowda I (1513–69), Yelahanka chieftain, founded the city of Bangalore
- Margaret Louisa Kempe (1806–1867), American planter, slave owner, and mother-in-law of Jefferson Davis
- Margery Kempe (c. 1373–after 1438), English autobiographer, religious pilgrim
- Raymond J. Kempe (born 1931), American lawyer and politician
- Rudolf Kempe (1910–76), German conductor
- William Kempe (died c. 1603), English actor and morris dancer
- Christophe Kempé (born 1975), French handball player

== See also ==
- Kemp (disambiguation)
