= Acts of the 88th Minnesota Legislature =

The acts of the 88th Minnesota Legislature includes all acts by the 88th Minnesota Legislature, which lasted from January 8, 2013, to January 5, 2015.

Bills are enacted after being passed by the Legislature and signed by the governor. However, if the governor vetoes a bill or line-item vetoes items that appropriate money in a bill, the bill or items can still be enacted by a two-thirds vote in both houses, unless the Legislature by adjournment prevents the bill's return.

== Summary of actions ==
In this Legislature, all acts have been approved (signed) by Governor Mark Dayton, with the exception of chapters 123, 124, 303, and items in chapters 99, 137, and 293. Chapter 123 became law without the governor's signature. Chapter 124, a proposed amendment to the Minnesota Constitution, did not require his approval. Chapters 99, 137, and 293 were subject to line-item vetoes. In chapter 99, the omnibus higher education act, an appropriation for a grant to Teach For America was line-item vetoed. In chapter 137, the omnibus legacy act, two appropriations were line-item vetoed: one for the Twin Cities metropolitan area regional parks system and one for aquatic invasive species grants to tribal and local governments. In chapter 293, the so-called "Timberjay bill," wording directing the appropriation of funds from a special account for the use by the legislative auditor was line-item vetoed. Chapter 303 (S.F. No. 2642), a bill that restricted the Minnesota State Lottery from certain activities, was vetoed in its entirety. No bills or items were enacted by the Legislature over the governor's veto.

== Laws ==
=== 2013 ===
==== Regular Session ====
Chapter	Date of enactment	Title
1	February 19, 2013	An act relating to human services; expanding medical assistance eligibility; requiring the use of modified adjusted gross income and a standard income disregard.
2	February 19, 2013	An act relating to state government; ratifying labor agreements and compensation plans.
3	February 20, 2013	An act relating to taxation; conforming certain income, franchise, and property tax refund provisions for tax year 2012 to the provisions of the Federal Aviation Administration Modernization and Reform Act of 2012 and the American Taxpayer Relief Act of 2012; changing provisions relating to the Iron Range Resources and Rehabilitation Board.
4	March 14, 2013	An act relating to waters; modifying drainage system provisions.
5	March 14, 2013	An act relating to crime; allowing offenses for financial exploitation of a vulnerable adult to be aggregated over a six-month period; expanding venue options for financial exploitation of a vulnerable adult.
6	March 14, 2013	An act relating to commerce; regulating electronic fund transfers; providing that article 4A of the Uniform Commercial Code does not apply to a remittance transfer that is not an electronic funds transfer under the federal Electronic Fund Transfer Act.
7	March 14, 2013	An act relating to state government; enacting the Uniform Electronic Legal Material Act approved by the National Conference of Commissioners on Uniform State Laws.
8	March 15, 2013	An act relating to health; requiring accreditation of advanced diagnostic imaging services operating in the state.
9	March 20, 2013	An act relating to commerce; establishing the Minnesota Insurance Marketplace; prescribing its powers and duties; establishing the right not to participate; specifying data practices procedures; establishing a legislative oversight committee; requiring reports; appropriating money.
10	March 21, 2013	An act relating to real property; providing for affidavit of survivorship; providing for release or partial release of lien of a mortgage; claiming an interest in registered land after registration; making technical and conforming changes.
11	April 15, 2013	An act relating to health; changing provisions for radiation therapy facility construction.
12	April 16, 2013	An act relating to transportation; highways; designating a segment of marked Trunk Highway 23 as Officer Tom Decker Memorial Highway.
13	April 15, 2013	An act relating to emergency medical services; modifying certain provisions to include advanced emergency medical technicians; updating inspection provisions; providing requirements for emergency medical responder registration.
14	April 22, 2013	An act relating to human rights; ensuring public accommodations for blind and disabled persons.
15	April 22, 2013	An act relating to workers' compensation reinsurance; eliminating the reinsurance association prefunded limit.
16	April 22, 2013	An act relating to state government; modifying false claims provisions.
17	April 22, 2013	An act relating to commerce; regulating mortgage foreclosures.
18	April 22, 2013	An act relating to health; requiring continuing education hours for certification as a community paramedic.
19	April 22, 2013	An act relating to metropolitan planning activities; extending the sunset date of the Metropolitan Area Water Supply Advisory Committee.
20	April 24, 2013	An act relating to public safety; creating new crimes relating to 911 emergency calls; providing criminal penalties.
21	April 24, 2013	An act relating to civil actions; modifying the limitations of actions for damages based on services or construction to improve real property.
22	April 24, 2013	An act relating to veterans; authorizing placement of a plaque in the court of honor on the Capitol grounds to honor American Indian veterans from this state.
23	April 24, 2013	An act relating to civil law; modifying the statutory short form power of attorney; authorizing certain judicial relief.
24	April 25, 2013	An act relating to community property; adopting the Uniform Community Property Rights at Death Act.
25	April 25, 2013	An act relating to health; modifying a social work licensure provision.
26	April 29, 2013	An act relating to state government; designating the month of April as Genocide Awareness and Prevention Month.
27	April 29, 2013	An act relating to employment; modifying prompt payment of wages requirements.
28	April 29, 2013	An act relating to evidence; limiting availability of certain evidence arising from a collaborative law process.
29	May 1, 2013	An act relating to human services; modifying membership requirements for the Council on Disability.
30	May 1, 2013	An act relating to children; creating the Family Reunification Act of 2013.
31	May 1, 2013	An act relating to nursing; modifying definitions in the Minnesota Nurse Practicing Act.
32	May 1, 2013	An act relating to public safety; expanding and updating the authority of the Statewide Radio Board to include the latest emergency communication technologies; authorizing the Statewide Radio Board to elect to become a statewide emergency communication board; including tribal governments in regional radio board structure; providing comprehensive authority under board to address all emergency communications; providing for rulemaking; requiring a study.
33	May 1, 2013	An act relating to workers' compensation; modifying Workers' Compensation Court of Appeals personnel provisions.
34	May 1, 2013	An act relating to public safety; clarifying certain statutory provisions relating to crime victim rights and programs; providing for a restitution working group.
35	May 1, 2013	An act relating to the state auditor; requiring employees and officers of local public pension plans to report unlawful actions.
36	May 1, 2013	An act relating to civil law; allowing agency designations on certain accounts; providing form language; making clarifying changes; clarifying filing requirements for appeals to Tax Court.
37	May 2, 2013	An act relating to judiciary; modifying certain provisions relating to the State Guardian Ad Litem Board.
38	May 2, 2013	An act relating to mines; making technical, clarifying, and other policy changes to mine inspector provisions.
39	May 6, 2013	An act relating to crime victims; authorizing a victim's estate to request or enforce an order for restitution.
40	May 7, 2013	An act relating to commerce; regulating certain lenders that use motor vehicle titles of the borrower as collateral.
41	May 7, 2013	An act relating to local government; giving Hennepin County the same authority as Minneapolis to negotiate agreements relating to skilled trade and craft workers and apprentices.
42	May 7, 2013	An act relating to liquor; regulating alcohol sales and distribution; authorizing and modifying various licenses.
43	May 7, 2013	An act relating to health; classifying criminal history record data on Minnesota Responds Medical Reserve Corps volunteers; requiring certain interviews for investigation of vulnerable adult complaints against HMO; enacting the Minnesota Radon Awareness Act; requiring radon education disclosure for residential real property; changing provisions for tuberculosis standards; changing adverse health events reporting requirements; modifying a poison control provision; providing liability coverage for certain volunteer medical personnel and permitting agreements to conduct criminal background studies; changing provisions for body art establishments and body art technicians; defining occupational therapy practitioners; changing provisions for occupational therapy; amending prescribing authority for legend drugs; providing penalties.
44	May 7, 2013	An act relating to health; making changes to the Medical Practice Act.
45	May 7, 2013	An act relating to solid waste; amending process for cities to implement organized collection of solid waste.
46	May 8, 2013	An act relating to local government; authorizing publication of advertisements for competitive bids in a recognized industry trade journal; requiring a report.
47	May 8, 2013	An act relating to public safety; modifying certain provisions regarding domestic abuse.
48	May 8, 2013	An act relating to workforce development; adding a representative from adult basic education programs to the Workforce Development Council.
49	May 9, 2013	An act relating to human services; distinguishing and clarifying law regarding civil commitment of sexually dangerous persons and persons with sexual psychopathic personalities from other civil commitments.
50	May 9, 2013	An act relating to commerce; preventing fraud; regulating money transmissions; establishing a no transmit list; requiring certain notifications and verifications.
51	May 9, 2013	An act relating to health; requiring a hospital staffing report; requiring a study on nurse staffing levels and patient outcomes; appropriating money.
52	May 9, 2013	An act relating to natural resources; appropriating money from environment and natural resources trust fund; modifying provisions for Legislative-Citizen Commission on Minnesota Resources; modifying requirements for land acquisition with trust fund money.
53	May 13, 2013	An act relating to commerce; regulating preneed funeral insurance.
54	May 13, 2013	An act relating to insurance; regulating annuity products; enacting and modifying a model regulation adopted by the National Association of Insurance Commissioners relating to suitability in annuity transactions.
55	May 13, 2013	An act relating to health; allowing a licensed dietitian or licensed nutritionist to adhere to a practice guideline or protocol for a legend drug prescribed by a physician.
56	May 13, 2013	An act relating to state government; requiring service on all parties for judicial review of contested case.
57	May 13, 2013	An act relating to energy; regulating a biomass mandate project and a proposed high-voltage transmission line.
58	May 13, 2013	An act relating to public health; banning formaldehyde in certain children's products.
59	May 13, 2013	An act relating to human services; modifying provisions related to chemical and mental health and state-operated services; allowing for data sharing; repealing a task force; updating terminology and repealing obsolete provisions; making technical changes.
60	May 13, 2013	An act relating to commerce; requiring estate sale conductors to post a bond to protect owners of the property to be sold.
61	May 13, 2013	An act relating to employment; limiting reliance on criminal history for employment purposes; providing for remedies.
62	May 16, 2013	An act relating to human services; updating outdated terminology.
63	May 16, 2013	An act relating to human services; making changes to continuing care provisions; modifying provisions related to advisory task forces, nursing homes, resident relocation, medical assistance, long-term care consultation services, assessments, and reporting of maltreatment; requiring a report.
64	May 16, 2013	An act relating to economic development; modifying loans to development authorities.
65	May 16, 2013	An act relating to family law; adoption; modifying certain child placement proceedings.
66	May 16, 2013	An act relating to metropolitan government; providing for redistricting of the Metropolitan Council districts.
67	May 16, 2013	An act relating to commerce; prohibiting restriction on sale of motor fuel.
68	May 16, 2013	An act relating to commerce; weights and measures; adding a requirement for identical product pricing; making technical updates to bring state into compliance with most recent federal fuel standards; establishing a minimum octane rating; modifying disclosure requirements for biodiesel and biofuel blends; modifying E85 requirements.
69	May 16, 2013	An act relating to private detectives; exempting certified public accounting services from licensure requirements.
70	May 16, 2013	An act relating to workers' compensation; making various policy and housekeeping changes; adopting advisory council recommendations; requiring a report.
71	May 16, 2013	An act relating to children's health; prohibiting sale of children's food containers containing bisphenol-A.
72	May 20, 2013	An act relating to human rights; changing provisions for certain certificates of compliance.
73	May 20, 2013	An act relating to state lands; modifying landowners' bill of rights; modifying land acquisition account; providing for school forests; adding to and deleting from state parks and forests; authorizing certain exchanges and sales of state lands; conveyance of certain tax-forfeited lands.
74	May 14, 2013	An act relating to marriage; providing for civil marriage between two persons; providing for exemptions and protections based on religious association.
75	May 20, 2013	An act relating to natural resources; requiring general permit for mechanical control of certain cattails.
76	May 20, 2013	An act relating to state government; regulating data protection for victims of violence.
77	May 20, 2013	An act relating to state government; ratifying labor agreements and compensation plans; appropriating money.
78	May 20, 2013	An act relating to the military; updating the Minnesota Code of Military Justice; providing clarifying language.
79	May 20, 2013	An act relating to lawful gambling; modifying account, record keeping, and other regulatory provisions.
80	May 20, 2013	An act relating to crime; providing for forfeiture of money used or intended for use to facilitate a prostitution or sex trafficking offense; appropriating money.
81	May 20, 2013	An act relating to human services; modifying provisions related to health care and medical assistance.
82	May 23, 2013	An act relating to state government; classifying or modifying certain provisions concerning data practices; requiring informed consent; amending definitions; allowing disclosure of certain data; allowing access to certain records; making technical changes; modifying certain provisions regarding transportation and health data; modifying certain provisions regarding criminal history records, criminal background checks, and other criminal justice data provisions; clarifying provisions regarding data on homestead and other tax applications; extending for six years the sunset provision for the newborn screening advisory committee; requiring a newborn screening program study; providing for destruction of data from mileage-based user fee pilot project; repealing the McGruff safe house program.
83	May 24, 2013	An act relating to state government; providing additional whistleblower protection to state employees.
84	May 24, 2013	An act relating to health plan regulation; regulating policy and contract coverages; conforming state law to federal requirements; establishing health plan market rules; modifying the designation of essential community providers.
85	May 23, 2013	An act relating to state government; appropriating money for jobs and economic development; modifying labor and industry; employment, economic development, and workforce development; unemployment insurance; miscellaneous provisions; commerce and consumer protection; utility regulation; energy and solar energy regulations; creating various renewable energy incentives; imposing penalties; increasing fees; requiring reports; authorizing rulemaking; appropriating money to various state boards, agencies, and departments.
86	May 23, 2013	An act relating to criminal justice; modifying certain provisions relating to public safety, courts, guardians and conservators, corrections, offenders, and data integration; requiring reports; providing for penalties; appropriating money for courts, Guardian Ad Litem Board, Uniform Laws Commission, Board on Judicial Standards, Board of Public Defense, sentencing guidelines, public safety, Peace Officer Standards and Training (POST) Board, Private Detective Board, human rights, and corrections.
87	May 24, 2013	An act relating to employment; modifying use of personal sick leave benefits; requiring a report.
88	May 24, 2013	An act relating to commerce; regulating building and construction contracts; prohibiting certain agreements to insure.
89	May 24, 2013	An act relating to civil actions; changing the limitation period for civil actions involving sexual abuse.
90	May 24, 2013	An act relating to courts; prohibiting exclusion from jury service on the basis of marital status or sexual orientation.
91	May 24, 2013	An act relating to debt management and debt settlement; clarifying exemption for attorneys at law; modifying regulation of debt settlement services.
92	May 24, 2013	An act relating to environment; requiring report of hazardous substance release to local 911 emergency dispatch center.
93	May 24, 2013	An act relating to transportation; bridges; providing for disposition of remnant steel of I-35W bridge.
94	May 24, 2013	An act relating to probate; authorizing inventory and emergency order protecting specified personal property of homicide victim to preserve rights of decedent's heirs and beneficiaries; adding notice of rights and procedures to crime victims' chapter.
95	May 24, 2013	An act relating to state government; updating provisions in the Geospatial Information Office.
96	May 24, 2013	An act relating to public safety; clarifying when conditional release terms of certain offenders begin.
97	May 24, 2013	An act relating to Hennepin County; updating and making technical corrections to county contract provisions.
98	May 24, 2013	An act relating to health; permitting licensed health care professionals to order use of physical agent modalities, electrical stimulation, and ultrasound devices.
99	May 24, 2013	An act relating to education; postsecondary; establishing a budget for higher education; appropriating money to the Office of Higher Education, the Board of Trustees of the Minnesota State Colleges and Universities, the Board of Regents of the University of Minnesota, and the Mayo Clinic; appropriating money for tuition relief; providing for the treatment of undocumented immigrants with respect to financial aid and tuition; regulating bonus payments; establishing the Minnesota Discovery, Research, and InnoVation Economy funding program; modifying provisions related to grants, awards, and aid, school registration, and licensure; requiring certain information to be provided in higher education budget proposals; making changes to the state grant program; establishing procedure for cancellation of required surety bond; repealing Higher Education Advisory Council; requiring a higher education mental health summit; creating a tribal college supplemental grant assistance program; recognizing veteran's experience and training for various higher education purposes; providing statewide electronic infrastructure; requiring reports.
100	May 24, 2013	An act relating to housing; landlord and tenant; imposing civil penalty for certain violations; amending certain provisions relating to tenants holding over; modifying certain time for appeal and notice of hearing; making technical, clarifying, and conforming changes.
101	May 24, 2013	An act relating to the Metropolitan Council; making miscellaneous technical corrections to statutes; removing and modifying obsolete language.
102	May 24, 2013	An act relating to transportation; amending regulations governing school bus use for special events.
103	May 24, 2013	An act relating to commerce; regulating money transmitters; clarifying required fraud prevention measures.
104	May 24, 2013	An act relating to judgments; regulating assigned consumer debt default judgments; providing a limitation period to bring an action arising out of consumer debt; setting the bail amount for failure to comply with judgment debtor disclosure requirements in consumer debt cases.
105	May 24, 2013	An act relating to the Public Facilities Authority; reorganizing certain grant programs; providing for small community wastewater treatment grants.
106	May 24, 2013	An act relating to commerce; modifying securities registration and franchise registration provisions.
107	May 24, 2013	An act relating to human services; modifying provisions related to fair hearings and internal audits; creating the Cultural and Ethnic Leadership Communities Council; removing obsolete language; making technical changes.
108	May 23, 2013	An act relating to state government; establishing the health and human services budget; modifying provisions related to health care, continuing care, human services licensing, children and family services, program integrity, health-related licensing boards, chemical and mental health services, managed care organizations, waiver provider standards, home care, and the Department of Health; redesigning home and community-based services; establishing payment methodologies for home and community-based services; adjusting provider rates; setting and modifying fees; modifying autism coverage; modifying assistance programs; establishing Northstar care for children; making technical changes; requiring studies; requiring reports; appropriating money.
109	May 24, 2013	An act relating to judiciary; modifying provisions governing records in juvenile court proceedings.
110	May 24, 2013	An act relating to business organizations; modifying certain duties and responsibilities of the secretary of state; providing a standard of conduct for directors of certain cooperatives.
111	May 23, 2013	An act relating to retirement; modifying State Board of Investment provisions; MSRS administrative provisions; PERA administrative provisions; benefit accrual rate specification; revisions and repeals of former local police and paid firefighter relief association laws; volunteer firefighter retirement changes; one person and small group retirement changes; miscellaneous provisions; state patrol retirement plan financial solvency measures; PERA plans salary definitions; public employees police and fire retirement plan financial solvency measures; Teachers Retirement Association early retirement reduction factors; first class city teacher retirement increases and financial solvency measures; judges retirement plan financial solvency measures; requiring reports; appropriating money.
112	May 24, 2013	An act relating to public safety; providing immunity for underage possession or consumption of alcohol for a person contacting 911 to seek assistance for another.
113	May 24, 2013	An act relating to human services; modifying provisions related to chemical and mental health and human services licensing; establishing methadone treatment program standards; modifying drug treatment provisions; adding to the list of Schedule I controlled substances.
114	May 23, 2013	An act relating to state government; appropriating money for environment, natural resources, and agriculture; modifying and providing for disposition of certain revenue; modifying pesticide control; providing certain fee exemptions; establishing agricultural water certification program; modifying Minnesota Noxious Weed Law; providing for biobased and biofuel products; modifying certain bond requirements; modifying animal waste technician provisions; making technical changes; modifying certain permit requirements; providing for federal law compliance; providing for certain easements; modifying all-terrain vehicle operating provisions; establishing pollinator habitat program; modifying snowmobile registration provisions; modifying state trails; modifying State Timber Act; modifying certain park boundaries and expenditures; modifying reporting requirements; modifying Petroleum Tank Release Cleanup Act; providing for silica sand mining model standards and technical assistance; providing for wastewater laboratory certification; providing for product stewardship program; providing for discontinuance of Hennepin County Soil and Water Conservation District; authorizing recreation of Hall's Island; providing for certain interim ordinance extension or renewal; repealing certain pollution control rules; modifying certain environmental review; modifying Water Law; modifying public utilities provisions; providing certain criteria for wastewater treatment systems; providing for sanitary districts; requiring studies and reports; requiring rulemaking.
115	May 24, 2013	An act relating to real estate; requiring loss mitigation by mortgage lenders and servicers.
116	May 22, 2013	An act relating to education; providing funding and policy for early childhood and family, prekindergarten through grade 12, and adult education, including general education, student accountability, education excellence, charter schools, special education, facilities, technology, nutrition, libraries, accounting, early childhood, self-sufficiency, lifelong learning, state agencies, and forecast adjustments; authorizing rulemaking; requiring reports; appropriating money.
117	May 23, 2013	An act relating to government finance; appropriating money for transportation, Metropolitan Council, and public safety activities and programs; providing for fund transfers, tort claims, and contingent appropriations; modifying policy and tax provisions relating to transportation, transit, and public safety; making technical and clarifying changes.
118	May 24, 2013	An act relating to civil actions; prohibiting waivers of liability for negligent conduct.
119	May 24, 2013	An act relating to bonds; modifying requirements for bond security.
120	May 24, 2013	An act relating to commerce; regulating bullion coin dealers; requiring registration; prohibiting certain conduct; providing enforcement authority and civil and criminal penalties.
121	May 24, 2013	An act relating to natural resources; modifying commissioner's authorities and duties; modifying definitions; modifying Minnesota Zoo provisions; modifying operating restrictions for all-terrain vehicles; modifying invasive species provisions; modifying watercraft provisions; providing for certain license seizures; modifying game and fish license provisions; modifying requirements for taking game and fish; providing for certain all-terrain vehicle registration and watercraft license exemptions; modifying nonresident all-terrain vehicle state trail pass requirements; requiring rulemaking.
122	May 24, 2013	An act relating to claims against the state; providing for settlement of certain claims; appropriating money.
123	May 28, 2013	An act relating to public safety; fire and police department aid; modifying threshold for financial reports and audits.
124	May 24, 2013	An act relating to state government; proposing an amendment to the Minnesota Constitution, article IV, section 9; authorizing a council to establish salaries for legislators; changing the composition of the Compensation Council.
125	May 24, 2013	An act relating to legislative enactments; correcting erroneous, ambiguous, and omitted text and obsolete references; removing redundant, conflicting, and superseded provisions; making miscellaneous corrections to laws, statutes, and rules.
126	May 24, 2013	An act relating to commerce; regulating motor vehicles; amending regulation of scrap metal processing; requiring proof of ownership or hold period for vehicles purchased for scrap; creating the automated property system; creating criminal penalties.
127	May 24, 2013	An act relating to transportation; amending various provisions related to transportation and public safety policies, including highway signs, trunk highway routes, state-aid systems, motor vehicle registration and license plates, record retention, motor vehicle dealers, pupil transportation, bicycles, motor vehicle weight and equipment, disability parking, drivers' licenses and senior identification cards, federal law conformity, agency organization, commercial vehicle regulations, railroads, land conveyance, transit and transit planning, operations, and accessibility.
128	May 24, 2013	An act relating to collective bargaining; authorizing collective bargaining for family child care providers; authorizing collective bargaining for home and community-based long-term care services.
129	May 24, 2013	An act relating to health; changing provisions for optometrists.
130	May 24, 2013	An act relating to insurance; regulating foreign language policies and advertising; authorizing electronic notices and documents.
131	May 23, 2013	An act relating to elections; making policy, technical, and clarifying changes to various provisions related to election law, including provisions related to absentee voting, redistricting, ballots, registration, voting, caucuses, candidates, recounts, campaigns, voting rights, voting data, vacancies in nomination, and election administration; providing an electronic roster pilot project and task force; requiring reports; appropriating money.
132	May 24, 2013	An act relating to energy; modifying provisions related to distributed generation and renewable energy; regulating conservation improvement investments for low-income programs; modifying eminent domain and condemnation procedures.
133	May 24, 2013	An act relating to crime; prescribing criminal penalties for assaulting a transit operator.
134	May 24, 2013	An act relating to state government; changing certain finance and budget provisions; adding the Office of MN.IT Services to certain provisions and changing certain MN.IT provisions; exempting the state information network from certain term limitations on contracts.
135	May 24, 2013	An act relating to commerce; making various technical and housekeeping changes related to staff adjusters, canceled licenses, and transfer fees; providing producer training requirements for flood insurance products; regulating the Commerce Fraud Bureau; requiring property and casualty actuarial opinions of reserves and supporting documentation; regulating the agricultural cooperative health plan for farmers; regulating real property appraisals; providing application, education, and training requirements; regulating certain Public Utilities Commission requests relating to service of notices, orders, and other documents; eliminating the membership camping license requirement; repealing an obsolete collection agency rule; correcting cross-references; making adjustments to various dollar amounts as required by state law; providing for a method to periodically update Minnesota Statutes to reflect the current dollar amounts as adjusted.
136	May 24, 2013	An act relating to capital improvements; appropriating money to acquire and better public land and buildings and other improvements of a capital nature; authorizing the sale and issuance of state bonds; modifying and cancelling prior appropriations.
137	May 23, 2013	An act relating to state government; appropriating money from the outdoor heritage fund, clean water fund, parks and trails fund, and arts and cultural heritage fund; providing for watershed restoration and protection strategies; creating the Greater Minnesota Regional Parks and Trails Commission; extending previous appropriations; providing for the allocation of arts and cultural heritage fund to the Minnesota State Arts Board; modifying certain grant eligibility; providing for sale of wine and malt liquor at Capitol cafeteria; requiring Minnesota-made solar photovoltaic modules; requiring report and study.
138	May 24, 2013	An act relating to government operations; making various policy, technical, conforming, and other changes to campaign finance and public disclosure law; providing for additional disclosure; modifying certain regulations, reporting, spending and contribution limits, registration, definitions, and various procedures; modifying definition of public official; modifying penalties related to corporate political contributions; providing penalties.
139	May 24, 2013	An act relating to public safety; creating increased penalties for wildfire arson that damages multiple buildings or dwellings, acreage, or crops, or causes demonstrable bodily harm; adding restitution provisions.
140	May 24, 2013	An act relating to transportation; motor vehicles; amending fees for certain motor vehicle titling transactions; appropriating money.
141	May 24, 2013	An act relating to disaster assistance; appropriating money to match federal disaster aid for the April 2013 severe winter storm in southwest Minnesota.
142	May 23, 2013	An act relating to the operation of state government; providing funding for the legislature, constitutional officers and other agencies, boards, councils, commissions, and state entities; changing certain state government programs; changing powers and duties of certain state officers; repealing the Minnesota Sunset Act; requiring the chair of the Legislative Advisory Commission alternate between a member of the senate and a member of the house of representatives; requiring the chair of the Legislative Advisory Commission be a senate member in 2013; allowing the Legislative Advisory Commission to accept grants and gifts related to the commission's duties; requiring data security audits by the legislative auditor under certain circumstances; requiring notification of the legislative auditor when public resources have been used unlawfully or government data has been accessed unlawfully; allowing the secretary of state authority to accept funds from local government units for election systems enhancements and to receive certain funds for the address confidentiality program; allowing the state auditor to change a onetime user fee for a small city and town accounting system software; changing provisions for bid solicitations and proposals; changing certain provisions for service contracts and the solicitation process; requiring a determination of the information technology cost for agency technology cost for agency technology projects; expanding E-Government initiative and establishing the E-Government Advisory Council; allowing a convenience fee for users of NorthStar or online government information services; changing certain audit provisions relating to duties of the state auditor and the legislative auditor; allowing the state auditor to bill counties and political subdivisions periodically for services rendered; establishing a state auditor enterprise fund; modifying provisions for general noncommercial radio station and equipment grants; removing investigative powers of the Mississippi River Parkway Commission; changing a paid military leave provision; modifying provisions in the Veterans Service Office grant program; changing provisions in the Minnesota GI Bill program; establishing presumption of rehabilitation by an honorable discharge status from military service following a prior offense; providing for a bid preference for contracts for veteran-owned small businesses; allowing active duty service members to take a peace officer reciprocity exam; making Department of Revenue changes; establishing electronic filing requirements; establishing an automobile theft prevention surcharge; requesting the legislative auditor conduct a data security of the Department of Revenue's use of debit cards for tax refunds; adjusting certain salary groups; making compensation council changes; requiring a compensation study; adjusting constitutional officers salaries; requiring reports; appropriating money.
143	May 23, 2013	An act relating to financing and operation of state and local government; making changes to individual income, corporate franchise, property, sales and use, estate, mineral, tobacco, alcohol, special, local, and other taxes and tax-related provisions modifying the property tax refund; changing property tax aids and credits; modifying the Sustainable Forest Incentive Act; modifying education aids and levies; providing additional pension funding; modifying definitions and distributions for property taxes; providing for property tax exemptions; modifying the payment in lieu of tax provisions; modifying education aids and levies; modifying tobacco tax provisions; making changes to additions and subtractions from federal taxable income; providing for federal conformity; changing income tax rates for individuals, estates, and trusts; providing income tax credits; modifying estate tax provisions; providing for a state gift tax; expanding the sales tax base; modifying the duty to collect and remit sales taxes for certain sellers; imposing the sales tax on digital products and selected services; modifying the definition of sale and purchase; modifying provisions for the rental motor vehicle tax rate; providing for multiple points of use certificates; modifying sales tax exemptions; authorizing local sales taxes; authorizing economic development powers; modifying tax increment financing rules; providing authority, organization, powers, duties, and requiring a prevailing wage for development of a Destination Medical Center; authorizing state infrastructure aid; modifying the distribution of taconite production taxes; authorizing taconite production tax bonds for grants to school districts; modifying and providing provisions for public finance; providing funding for legislative office facilities; modifying the definition of market value for tax, debt, and other purposes; making conforming, policy, and technical changes to tax provisions; requiring studies and reports; appropriating money.
144	May 24, 2013	An act relating to legislative enactments; correcting miscellaneous oversights, inconsistencies, ambiguities, unintended results, and technical errors.

==== 1st Special Session ====
Chapter	Date of enactment	Title
1	September 9, 2013	An act relating to disaster assistance; appropriating money to match federal disaster aid for the June 2013 severe storms and flooding; appropriating money for the April 2013 winter storms; reducing prior appropriations.

=== 2014 ===
==== Regular Session ====
Chapter	Date of enactment	Title
145	February 28, 2014	An act relating to energy; appropriating money for low-income home energy heating assistance.
146	March 12, 2014	An act relating to counties; providing a process for making certain county offices appointive in Jackson, Lake, Clay, Kandiyohi, and Lyon Counties.
147	March 14, 2014	An act relating to health; making changes to resident reimbursement classifications.
148	March 25, 2014	An act relating to local government; making the Blue Earth County library board advisory to the county board.
149	March 25, 2014	An act relating to higher education; modernizing, streamlining, and clarifying various statutes; eliminating unnecessary or redundant laws and rules; deleting obsolete language and unnecessary verbiage.
150	March 21, 2014	An act relating to financing and operation of state and local government; making changes to individual income, corporate franchise, property, sales and use, estate, mineral, local, and other taxes and tax-related provisions; changing property tax aids and credits; modifying education aids and levies; making changes to additions and subtractions from federal taxable income; providing for federal conformity; changing tax rates for estates; modifying income tax credits; modifying estate tax provisions; repealing the gift tax; modifying the definition of sale and purchase; modifying sales tax exemptions; modifying tax increment financing rules; modifying the distribution of taconite production taxes; modifying and providing provisions for public finance; report; appropriating money.
151	March 26, 2014	An act relating to state government; ratifying labor agreements and compensation plans.
152	April 2, 2014	An act relating to the military; removing obsolete, redundant, and unnecessary laws related to military affairs.
153	April 3, 2014	An act relating to civil actions; adjusting certain time limits relating to the certification of expert review because of recent amendments to the Minnesota Rules of Civil Procedure.
154	April 3, 2014	An act relating to public safety; deputy registrars; removing the residency requirement for deputy registrars.
155	April 3, 2014	An act relating to transportation; highways; designating a segment of marked Trunk Highway 36 as Officer Richard Crittenden, Sr., Memorial Highway.
156	April 11, 2014	An act relating to human services; modifying appropriations to the commissioner of human services for grant programs.
157	April 11, 2014	An act relating to business organizations; regulating the organization and operation of limited liability companies; enacting a revised uniform limited liability company act; providing conforming changes.
158	April 11, 2014	An act relating to state government; requiring continued employer insurance contributions for certain former state employees.
159	April 11, 2014	An act relating to state government; designating March 31 as Cesar Chavez Day.
160	April 9, 2014	An act relating to education; providing for safe and supportive schools by prohibiting bullying.
161	April 11, 2014	An act relating to housing; repealing obsolete, redundant, and unnecessary laws and rules under the direction of the Minnesota Housing Finance Agency; making conforming changes; changing a State Register notice requirement.
162	April 11, 2014	An act relating to cosmetology; making changes to the Board of Cosmetologist Examiners; authorizing exempt rulemaking; revises requirements for professional associations offering continuing education; revises requirements for cosmetology postsecondary schools.
163	April 11, 2014	An act relating to food safety; providing a definition of farmers' market; permitting food product sampling and demonstration in certain circumstances; providing a licensing exemption for a chili or soup cook-off event.
164	April 11, 2014	An act relating to water; modifying drainage system provisions.
165	April 11, 2014	An act relating to commerce; prohibiting certain practices in connection with a sales representative agreement.
166	April 14, 2014	An act relating to employment; providing labor standards for private and public employees; regulating the minimum wage; regulating state employee use of donated vacation leave.
167	April 25, 2014	An act relating to Dakota County; authorizing adoption of local county government plan.
168	April 25, 2014	An act relating to public safety; providing for accreditation of forensic laboratories.
169	April 25, 2014	An act relating to state government; exempting a person who performs threading from licensing; authorizing the good cause exemption for rulemaking.
170	April 25, 2014	An act relating to business organizations; providing a prefiling document review; regulating limited liability companies and business corporations.
171	April 25, 2014	An act relating to civil commitment; requiring simultaneous competency and civil commitment examinations for defendants; facilitating civil commitment hearings for defendants.
172	April 29, 2014	An act relating to corporations; providing for the organization and operation of public benefit corporations.
173	April 29, 2014	An act relating to the safe at home program; regulating participant data and real property records.
174	April 29, 2014	An act relating to state government; making technical changes affecting the Minnesota Historical Society.
175	April 29, 2014	An act relating to transportation; amending regulation of limousines.
176	April 29, 2014	An act relating to elections; extending the deadline to purchase voting equipment with Help America Vote Act grants.
177	April 29, 2014	An act relating to public safety; clarifying probable cause arrests for violations of protection, restraining, and no contact orders; modifying time limit for probable cause arrests for domestic abuse.
178	April 29, 2014	An act relating to health; modifying the use of the all-payer claims data; convening a work group to make recommendations on expanded uses of the all-payer claims database.
179	April 30, 2014	An act relating to public beaches; requiring lifeguards at public beaches to have certain minimum training.
180	April 30, 2014	An act relating to public safety; providing technical amendments to criminal vehicular homicide or operation statute; clarifying driving while impaired law to work with amendments to criminal vehicular homicide and operation statute.
181	April 30, 2014	An act relating to agriculture; weights and measures; removing obsolete, redundant, and unnecessary laws administered by the Department of Agriculture; modifying biodiesel fuel requirements.
182	April 30, 2014	An act relating to workers' compensation; adopting the recommendations of the Workers' Compensation Advisory Council.
183	April 30, 2014	An act relating to local government; authorizing District One Hospital to sell real and personal property; providing for dissolution of a hospital district.
184	April 30, 2014	An act relating to insurance; authorizing certain benefits for Minnesota FAIR plan employees; providing certain conforming and technical changes.
185	April 29, 2014	An act relating to elections; modifying campaign finance definition; providing for submission of voter registration and absentee ballot applications online.
186	May 1, 2014	An act relating to public safety; traffic regulations; clarifying requirements pertaining to collisions; making a terminology change.
187	May 1, 2014	An act relating to state government; changing provisions in grants management process and contract management; providing an encumbrance exception in the grant process.
188	May 1, 2014	An act relating to housing; landlord and tenant; establishing remedies for victims of violence; establishing a housing opportunities made equitable pilot project.
189	May 1, 2014	An act relating to families; updating the Uniform Interstate Family Support Act.
190	May 1, 2014	An act relating to commerce; establishing a fee schedule for automated property system transactions; authorizing state auditor to examine fee schedule; delaying effective dates for automated property system; requiring reports.
191	May 1, 2014	An act relating to mortgage foreclosures; amending the definition of a small servicer; clarifying the Foreclosure Curative Act.
192	May 1, 2014	An act relating to health; making technical changes; eliminating or modernizing antiquated, unnecessary, and obsolete provisions.
193	May 1, 2014	An act relating to state government; creating a Legislative Commission on Data Practices and Personal Data Privacy.
194	May 5, 2014	An act relating to transportation; motor vehicles; modifying the permitted uses of vehicles used for testing.
195	May 5, 2014	An act relating to local government; repealing the authorization for the creation of the Grand Rapids Central School Commission.
196	May 5, 2014	An act relating to state government; making technical changes; renumbering sections; eliminating or modernizing antiquated, unnecessary, and obsolete language; updating existing provisions.
197	May 5, 2014	An act relating to family law; making changes to custody and parenting time provisions.
198	May 5, 2014	An act relating to commerce; regulating certain licensees; modifying education requirements; making technical changes; modifying enforcement provisions and other actions; prohibiting certain homeowners policy surcharges; regulating insurance holding company systems by enacting changes proposed by the National Association of Insurance Commissioners.
199	May 5, 2014	An act relating to commerce; modifying regulation of real estate brokers and salespersons.
200	May 6, 2014	An act relating to courts; amending partial payment or reimbursement of costs from a party proceeding in forma pauperis.
201	May 6, 2014	An act relating to criminal justice; modifying judicial forfeiture provisions.
202	May 6, 2014	An act relating to judiciary; modifying the review process of district judge disposition for compliance with 90-day disposition requirement.
203	May 6, 2014	An act relating to health; modifying the newborn screening program.
204	May 6, 2014	An act relating to courts; providing that petitioners in errors and omissions petitions shall also serve the petition on all candidates for the office in which the error or omission is alleged; eliminating requirements that court seal be a raised seal; removing requirements for notarial act on pleadings and affidavits filed with the court in all cases; providing that court documents are signed under penalty of perjury; permitting alternative service in certain probate matters; requiring applicants in structured settlement transfer action to provide the court with information; providing that a request for a hearing in response to a temporary restraining order must be made within 20 days after the temporary restraining order is served; permitting application of fine payment to restitution before application to court fines.
205	May 6, 2014	An act relating to courts; allowing housing courts and housing calendars to use referees almost exclusively for landlord and tenant cases.
206	May 9, 2014	An act relating to local government; authorizing meetings by telephone or other electronic means.
207	May 9, 2014	An act relating to veterans; authorizing special women veterans license plates; appropriating money.
208	May 9, 2014	An act relating to data practices; classifying checking account numbers as nonpublic data.
209	May 9, 2014	An act relating to corrections; eliminating the requirement of contiguous counties from qualifications for a grant for the delivery of correctional services.
210	May 9, 2014	An act relating to elections; authorizing the Saint Louis County Board to change to two years the term of a certain member to be elected in 2014.
211	May 9, 2014	An act relating to labor; creating the Public Employment Relations Board; authorizing rulemaking; appropriating money.
212	May 9, 2014	An act relating to public safety; amending and repealing outdated and redundant statutes; requiring a report on collection of data on victims of domestic abuse.
213	May 9, 2014	An act relating to public safety; prohibiting persons subject to domestic violence restraining orders from possessing weapons; requiring persons convicted of domestic violence offenses to surrender their firearms while they are prohibited from possessing firearms; providing penalties.
214	May 9, 2014	An act relating to local government; authorizing local governments to transfer cemetery property to a tribal cemetery association.
215	May 9, 2014	An act relating to commerce; updating the laws regulating liens on personal property in self-storage.
216	May 9, 2014	An act relating to transportation; highways; designating Nicholas Patrick Spehar Memorial Highway.
217	May 9, 2014	An act relating to natural resources; modifying disposition of certain land and revenue; adding to and deleting from state forests and recreation areas; authorizing public and private sales and exchanges of certain state lands; merging certain state parks; authorizing the purchase of a dam.
218	May 9, 2014	An act relating to corrections; amending and repealing outdated and redundant statutes.
219	May 9, 2014	An act relating to public employment; changing the definition of a confidential employee.
220	May 9, 2014	An act relating to local government; providing annexation definitions; limiting the annexation by ordinance of certain parcels.
221	May 9, 2014	An act relating to energy; regulating the routing process for high-voltage transmission lines; prohibiting the designation of a preferred route in the permitting process.
222	May 9, 2014	An act relating to commerce; removing or modifying obsolete, unnecessary, or redundant laws and rules administered by the Department of Commerce or the Public Utilities Commission; making conforming changes.
223	May 9, 2014	An act relating to labor and employment; providing employee protections in joint powers agreements.
224	May 9, 2014	An act relating to local government; authorizing four-year terms for Grand Rapids Public Utilities Commission.
225	May 9, 2014	An act relating to environment; making changes to resource recovery provisions.
226	May 9, 2014	An act relating to natural resources; appropriating money from environment and natural resources trust fund; modifying provisions for Legislative-Citizen Commission on Minnesota Resources.
227	May 9, 2014	An act relating to transportation; eliminating certain reporting requirements; eliminating or modernizing antiquated, unnecessary, redundant, and obsolete provisions; making conforming changes.
228	May 9, 2014	An act relating to human services; modifying provisions related to licensing data, human services licensing, child care programs, financial fraud and abuse investigations, and vendors of chemical dependency treatment services; modifying background studies; establishing a foreign trained physician task force.
229	May 9, 2014	An act relating to Hennepin County; modifying the multijurisdictional reinvestment program.
230	May 9, 2014	An act relating to school board elections; authorizing Special School District No. 6, South St. Paul, to dissolve election districts.
231	May 9, 2014	An act relating to liens; regulating liens on personal property; providing for the sale of a motor vehicle held by a licensed dealer.
232	May 9, 2014	An act relating to health; providing for drug overdose prevention and medical assistance; limiting liability.
233	May 13, 2014	An act relating to civil actions; regulating certain human rights actions; requiring jury trials.
234	May 13, 2014	An act relating to public safety; addressing the needs of incarcerated women related to pregnancy and childbirth; authorizing an advisory committee.
235	May 13, 2014	An act relating to health; improving access to health care delivered by advanced practice registered nurses; providing penalties; providing for an advisory council; appropriating money.
236	May 13, 2014	An act relating to occupations; modifying licensing provisions for architecture, engineering, land surveying, landscape architecture, geoscience, and interior design professions.
237	May 13, 2014	An act relating to environment; classifying certain data; modifying certain reporting requirements; modifying and creating certain permitting efficiencies; modifying duties of Pollution Control Agency; modifying administrative penalty order and field citation provisions; providing civil penalties; requiring rulemaking; appropriating money.
238	May 13, 2014	An act relating to elections; voters; authorizing secretary of state to obtain certain data from Department of Public Safety; authorizing secretary of state to share certain data.
239	May 11, 2014	An act relating to state government; providing for the Women's Economic Security Act; requiring equal pay certificates of compliance; modifying workforce development provisions; creating women and high-wage, high-demand, nontraditional jobs grant program; modifying eligibility for unemployment insurance benefits; offering women entrepreneurs business development grants; requiring a report on a potential state-administered retirement savings plan; modifying parenting leave, sick leave, and pregnancy accommodations; providing employment protections; providing wage disclosure protection; appropriating money.
240	May 13, 2014	An act relating to regulated industries; providing for sale, storage, and other regulations of liquor; authorizing, modifying, and establishing various liquor licenses; providing for lawful gambling fraud.
241	May 14, 2014	An act relating to telecommunications; consumer protection; requiring antitheft functionality for smart phones to deter theft; establishing requirements for acquisition and resale of wireless communications devices.
242	May 13, 2014	An act relating to crime; clarifying the crime of failure to pay court-ordered support.
243	May 13, 2014	An act relating to transportation; removing length limit of certain connector highways; allowing one-week bid advertisement period for certain trunk highway contracts.
244	May 13, 2014	An act relating to public safety; eliminating part-time peace officer licensure.
245	May 13, 2014	An act relating to judiciary; modifying filing of petition for relief from conviction; modifying notice to offender for restitution.
246	May 14, 2014	An act relating to criminal justice; modifying provisions governing expungement of criminal records; requiring business screening services to delete expunged records; allowing expungement of eviction records in certain cases.
247	May 16, 2014	An act relating to education; including additional therapists within the teacher bargaining unit.
248	May 16, 2014	An act relating to natural resources; modifying and repealing certain obsolete laws; providing for certain regulatory efficiencies.
249	May 16, 2014	An act relating to commerce; modifying requirements for Department of Commerce licensee education.
250	May 16, 2014	An act relating to human services; modifying requirements for human services background studies.
251	May 16, 2014	An act relating to unemployment insurance; making policy and housekeeping changes to the unemployment insurance program; adopting recommendations of the Unemployment Insurance Advisory Council.
252	May 16, 2014	An act relating to claims against the state; providing for settlement of certain claims; authorizing certain payments by the Department of Transportation; appropriating money.
253	May 16, 2014	An act relating to state government; providing for enhancement of accountability and transparency in public construction; establishing a requirement for and a definition of responsible contractor.
254	May 16, 2014	An act relating to energy; modifying, adding, or authorizing provisions governing medically necessary equipment, propane sales, low-income rate discounts, interconnection of distributed generation, electric vehicle charging tariffs, on-bill repayment programs, energy efficiency programs, emissions reduction planning, certificates of need, solar energy systems, transmission lines, and low-income home energy assistance; repealing certain obsolete administrative rules; requiring a report.
255	May 16, 2014	An act relating to transportation; modernizing provisions governing motor vehicles; eliminating certain antiquated, unnecessary, and obsolete provisions; making technical and conforming changes.
256	May 16, 2014	An act relating to natural resources; appropriating money from outdoor heritage fund; modifying restoration evaluation requirements; modifying provisions for acquiring real property with money from outdoor heritage fund.
257	May 16, 2014	An act relating to civil actions; prohibiting certain indemnification agreements.
258	May 16, 2014	An act relating to clean water; abolishing the privatization of water or wastewater treatment law.
259	May 16, 2014	An act relating to public safety; modifying and clarifying predatory offender registration requirements; clarifying sentence for crime of criminal sexual conduct in the third degree.
260	May 16, 2014	An act relating to public safety; amending the definition of crime of violence in the firearm law.
261	May 16, 2014	An act relating to transportation; amending requirements governing graduated driver licensing.
262	May 16, 2014	An act relating to human services; removing obsolete provisions from statute and rule relating to children and family services, health care, chemical and mental health services, continuing care, and operations; modifying provisions governing the elderly waiver, the alternative care program, and mental health services for children.
263	May 16, 2014	An act relating to public safety; authorizing counties to establish pilot projects to use GPS to monitor domestic abuse offenders; requiring reports.
264	May 16, 2014	An act relating to elections; modifying provisions related to election administration; making changes to election provisions related to voting, voter registration, absentee ballots, ballots, soil and water conservation districts, candidates, municipal elections, school district elections, the recall of elected officials, and other election-related provisions; making technical and clarifying changes; providing for dissolution of certain election districts.
265	May 16, 2014	An act relating to campaign finance; modifying certain contribution limits; requiring certain reports to be made available online.
266	May 16, 2014	An act relating to real property; making clarifying and conforming changes relating to ownership of real estate by spouses and mortgage redemption periods; modifying transfer on death deeds.
267	May 16, 2014	An act relating to state observances; creating Veterans' Voices Month.
268	May 16, 2014	An act relating to peace officers; providing reciprocity for military experience.
269	May 16, 2014	An act relating to public safety; compensating exonerated persons; appropriating money.
270	May 16, 2014	An act relating to public safety; enhancing penalties for certain repeat criminal sexual conduct offenders.
271	May 16, 2014	An act relating to state government; repealing obsolete, redundant, and unnecessary laws administered by the Department of Employment and Economic Development, Metropolitan Council, and MN.IT; making conforming changes.
272	May 16, 2014	An act relating to education; providing for policy and technical modifications in early childhood and family, kindergarten through grade 12, and adult education including general education, education excellence, English learners and language proficiency, special programs, nutrition, libraries, unsession and conforming changes, and an interstate compact.
273	May 16, 2014	An act relating to public safety; towing; clarifying towing order requirements.
274	May 16, 2014	An act relating to state government; making changes to the open meeting law.
275	May 16, 2014	An act relating to legislative enactments; correcting erroneous, ambiguous, and omitted text and obsolete references; removing redundant, conflicting, and superseded provisions; making miscellaneous corrections to laws, statutes, and rules.
276	May 16, 2014	An act relating to metropolitan transit; expanding scope of jurisdiction of Transportation Accessibility Advisory Committee.
277	May 16, 2014	An act relating to environment; prohibiting and regulating certain lead and mercury products; modifying ban on formaldehyde in children's products; prohibiting certain cleaning products containing triclosan.
278	May 16, 2014	An act relating to public safety; requiring law enforcement to secure a tracking warrant in order to receive electronic device location information.
279	May 16, 2014	An act relating to insurance; amending provisions relating to health coverage for school district employees.
280	May 16, 2014	An act relating to motor vehicles; license plates; authorizing a retired firefighters special plate and a veteran's special motorcycle plate for combat wounded veterans; making technical changes.
281	May 16, 2014	An act relating to transportation; motor vehicles; eliminating barriers to the purchase of electric and plug-in hybrid electric vehicles by state agencies; requiring a report.
282	May 21, 2014	An act relating to state government; establishing a legislative salary council; modifying a proposed constitutional amendment to remove lawmakers' power to set their own pay.
283	May 21, 2014	An act relating to business organizations; regulating certain filings, recordings, and registrations with the secretary of state.
284	May 21, 2014	An act relating to data practices; enhancing certain penalties and procedures related to unauthorized access to data by a public employee; requiring disclosure of certain data related to use of the CIBRS law enforcement database.
285	May 21, 2014	An act relating to public safety; granting the Board of Pharmacy cease and desist authority to prevent the sale of synthetic drugs; modifying laws governing misbranding drugs, adulterated drugs; expanding the definition of drug; repealing the sunset and legislative reporting requirement for the Board of Pharmacy's emergency drug scheduling authority; providing for mandatory restitution when a person is convicted for selling controlled substance under false pretense of being legal; establishing a public education plan; appropriating money.
286	May 21, 2014	An act relating to state government; modifying laws governing certain executive branch advisory groups.
287	May 21, 2014	An act relating to transportation; making technical changes to provisions affecting the Department of Transportation; clarifying contract and project requirements; designating the Michael Duane Clickner Memorial Bridge; providing bridge inspection authority in certain instances; modifying U-turn rules; modifying requirements for covered farm vehicles; extending an expiration date; providing an hours of service exemption; requiring user financing for a certain parking facility; modifying reporting requirements.
288	May 21, 2014	An act relating to elections; authorizing the use of electronic rosters; requiring an evaluation of the use of electronic rosters in the 2014 election; making various technical and conforming changes; providing definitions.
289	May 21, 2014	An act relating to natural resources; modifying all-terrain vehicle and off-highway motorcycle provisions; providing for certain regulatory efficiencies; modifying commissioner's authority; modifying landfill cleanup program; modifying invasive species provisions; modifying definition of snowmobile; prohibiting tampering with off-road recreational vehicle odometers; modifying use of forest trails; modifying outdoor recreation system provisions; modifying Water Law; modifying forestry provisions; modifying provision related to environmental impact statements; requiring rulemaking.
290	May 21, 2014	An act relating to natural resources; modifying game and fish laws; modifying use of vehicles for hunting; modifying all-terrain vehicle definitions; modifying oversight committee provisions; modifying provisions for wildlife management areas; modifying trespass provisions; modifying license provisions and fees; requiring certain invasive species training; providing for certain grants; requiring development of certain master plan; modifying provisions for taking wild animals; authorizing nonlethal hazing of Canada geese; modifying disability-related angling and hunting licenses and special permit provisions; providing for designations on driver's license and Minnesota identification card; modifying requirements of raffles with a wild game or fish taking event; updating and eliminating certain obsolete language; modifying prior appropriations; authorizing certain cattail removal; requiring a report; requiring rulemaking.
291	May 21, 2014	An act relating to state government; making changes to health and human services policy provisions; modifying provisions relating to children and family services, the provision of health services, chemical and mental health services, health-related occupations, Department of Health, public health, continuing care, public assistance programs, and health care; establishing reporting requirements and grounds for disciplinary action for health professionals; making changes to the medical assistance program; modifying provisions governing child care and juvenile safety and placement; regulating the sale and use of tobacco-related and electronic delivery devices; modifying requirements for local boards of health; making changes to provisions governing the Board of Pharmacy; modifying home and community-based services standards; revising the Minnesota family investment program; establishing and modifying task forces and advisory councils; making changes to grant programs; modifying certain penalty fees; requiring studies and reports; authorizing rulemaking; appropriating money.
292	May 21, 2014	An act relating to deposits and investments of public funds; granting the Metropolitan Council additional investment authority; authorizing certain investments by a Minnesota joint powers investment trust; making certain conforming technical changes.
293	May 28, 2014	An act relating to data practices; clarifying application of government data practices act to parties contracting with a government entity; establishing a data security account; authorizing fees for bulk vehicle records requests; requiring the legislative commission on data practices to study the use of motor vehicle and driver's license records; requiring a study of certain health care issues.
294	May 20, 2014	An act relating to capital investment; authorizing spending to acquire and better public land and buildings and other improvements of a capital nature with certain conditions; modifying previous appropriations; establishing new programs and modifying existing programs; authorizing the use of negotiated sales; authorizing the transfer of state bond-financed property; authorizing the sale and issuance of state bonds; appropriating money.
295	May 20, 2014	An act relating to capital investment; appropriating money for capital improvement projects; modifying grant programs; authorizing the Housing Finance Agency to issue housing infrastructure bonds.
296	May 21, 2014	An act relating to retirement; various Minnesota public employee retirement plans; allowing MSRS-General deferred members to vote in board elections; continuing Stevens County Housing and Redevelopment Authority employees in PERA-General; excluding fixed-route bus drivers employed by the St. Cloud Metropolitan Transit Commission from PERA-General coverage; increasing member and employer contribution rates for certain retirement plans; providing for the consolidation of the Duluth Teachers Retirement Fund Association retirement plan and fund into the statewide Teachers Retirement Association; revising an amortization target date, creating new state aid programs; appropriating money; extending a MnSCU early retirement incentive program; increasing the limit for certain reemployed MnSCU retirees; extending the applicability of a second chance at tenure retirement coverage election opportunity for MnSCU faculty members; revising investment authority for various defined contribution plans or programs; authorizing the State Board of Investment to revise, remove, or create investment options for the Minnesota supplemental investment fund; expanding permissible investments under the unclassified state employees retirement program, the public employees defined contribution plan, the deferred compensation program, and the health care savings plan; revising salary reporting requirements; clarifying retirement provision applications to sheriffs; revising local government postretirement option program requirements and extending expiration date; clarifying future postretirement adjustment rates for former members of the former Minneapolis Firefighters Relief Association and the former Minneapolis Police Relief Association; making technical changes to amortization state aid and supplemental state aid; clarifying the eligibility of independent nonprofit firefighting corporations to receive police and fire supplemental retirement state aid; implementing the recommendations of the 2013-2014 state auditor volunteer fire working group; modifying the disability benefit application deadline for certain former Wadena County sheriff's deputies; authorizing city of Duluth and Duluth Airports Authority employee salary-supplement payments coverage following Court of Appeals decision; specifying interest rate for computing joint and survivor annuities; revising postretirement adjustment triggers; revising reemployed annuitant withholding in certain divorce situations; clarifying medical advisor and resumption of teaching provisions; specifying explicit postretirement adjustment assumptions; allowing volunteer firefighter relief associations to pay state fire chiefs association dues from the special fund; authorizing MnSCU employee to elect TRA coverage and transfer past service from IRAP to TRA; clarifying the applicability of 2013 postretirement adjustment modifications to certain county sheriffs; ratifying or grandparenting MSRS-Correctional plan coverage for Department of Human Services employees; allowing various service credit purchases; requiring a PERA report on certain survivor benefit amounts.
297	May 21, 2014	An act relating to transportation; roads; eliminating the sunset of certain snow removal authority.
298	May 21, 2014	An act relating to public safety; clarifying the scope of the ignition interlock device program relating to criminal vehicular operation.
299	May 21, 2014	An act relating to environment; prohibiting plants treated with pollinator lethal insecticide from being labeled or advertised as beneficial to pollinators.
300	May 21, 2014	An act relating to transportation; railroads; amending regulation of motor carriers of railroad employees; imposing penalties.
301	May 21, 2014	An act relating to notaries public; increasing maximum fees permitted to be charged by notaries public.
302	May 21, 2014	An act relating to public safety; providing enhanced penalties for causing the death of a prosecuting attorney or judge or assaulting a prosecuting attorney or judge.
304	May 21, 2014	An act relating to state government; prohibiting state agencies from paying more than ten percent over the appraised value to acquire real property; requiring a report.
305	May 21, 2014	An act relating to labor and industry; extending an independent contractor pilot program; making federal conformity changes to the apprenticeship program; modifying municipal building code enforcement; providing an exception to high pressure boiler requirements; requiring a workgroup to study plumbing at certain resorts; appropriating money for a high pressure boiler study.
306	May 21, 2014	An act relating to crime; extending the felony of fraudulent or other improper financing statements to include retaliation against a police officer, chief of police, or official or employee of the Department of Corrections or local correctional agency for performing official duties.
307	May 21, 2014	An act relating to state government; modifying investment reporting.
308	May 20, 2014	An act relating to financing and operation of state and local government; making changes to individual income, property, sales and use, excise, estate, mineral, tobacco, alcohol, special, local, and other taxes and tax-related provisions; providing for and increasing credits and refunds; modifying local government aids; modifying property tax exclusions, exemptions, and levy deadlines; imposing a tax on solar energy production; modifying installment payments; modifying special service districts; modifying sales, use, and excise tax incentives and exemptions; changing certain sales, use, and excise tax remittances; modifying and allowing certain local sales and use taxes; providing for voluntary compliance; modifying income tax credits and subtractions; clarifying estate tax provisions; modifying minerals tax provisions; reallocating certain bond payments; providing for certain local development projects; modifying tax increment finance rules; authorizing debt service aid and local bonding authority; designating the "Old Cedar Avenue Bridge"; changing license revocation procedures; modifying certain county levy authority; removing obsolete, redundant, and unnecessary laws and administrative rules administered by the Department of Revenue; making various policy and technical changes; requiring reports; appropriating money.
309	May 21, 2014	An act relating to campaign finance; modifying duties of board; requiring rulemaking; authorizing online electronic records systems; authorizing the board to request reconciliation information; authorizing penalties; modifying certain definitions and fee amounts; modifying certain reporting and filing requirements; making various technical and clarifying changes; providing data classifications; modifying statements of economic interest.
310	May 21, 2014	An act relating to insurance; modifying certain regulations to reduce the incidence of insurance fraud; regulating no-fault auto benefits; modifying certain economic benefits under chapter 65B; establishing a task force on motor vehicle insurance coverage verification.
311	May 29, 2014	An act relating to health; providing for medical cannabis registry program; authorizing rulemaking; establishing duties of patients, health care practitioners, and manufacturer of medical cannabis; establishing patient protections; imposing penalties; establishing fees; requiring impact assessment of medical cannabis therapeutic research; requiring audits; appropriating money.
312	May 20, 2014	An act relating to state government; providing supplemental appropriations for Office of Higher Education, Board of Trustees of the Minnesota State Colleges and Universities, Board of Regents of the University of Minnesota; jobs, economic development, labor, commerce and housing finance; state government and veterans; public safety and corrections; transportation; agriculture, environment, natural resources and clean water; early childhood education; kindergarten through grade 12; community and adult education including general education; education excellence; special education; education facilities; nutrition; state education agencies; health and human services; making certain appropriations adjustments; modifying disposition of certain revenues; providing a grant to College Possible; providing funding for regenerative medicine research; regulating study abroad programs; providing resident tuition rates for certain military veterans; authorizing participation in the interstate reciprocity agreement; authorizing student loan refinancing; requiring a transfer from the assigned risk plan in the event of surplus; establishing broadband development grants; modifying workforce development outcomes; requiring workers' compensation reform; modifying an energy loan program; establishing deaf, deafblind, and hard-of-hearing grants; modifying distribution of a taconite tax; implementing an innovation voucher pilot program; establishing competency standards for certain industries; creating the Legislative Water Commission; making changes to the Compensation Council; expediting professional licensure for members of the military; transferring funds to a disaster assistance contingency account; modifying certain provisions pertaining to victims of domestic violence; permitting the court to continue a juvenile case without a finding of delinquency; continuing the fire safety advisory committee; lowering the penalty for the performance of acts prohibited by statutes for which no penalty is specified; extending University of Minnesota service of alcohol; providing for disaster assistance for public entities with and without federal assistance; providing for railroad and railroad yard safety and emergency preparedness; designating the Trooper Glen Skolman Memorial Highway; modifying various provisions governing fund use, driver's licenses and permits, license plates, speed limits, work zones, gross vehicle weights and permits, products and services billing, safety oversight, light rail vehicle design, transit shelters and stops, highway turnbacks, and watercraft decontamination sites; providing for federal conformity; establishing a community destination sign pilot program; providing for transit service on election day; modifying off-highway motorcycle provisions; creating accounts; providing for certain grants; providing for protection of pollinators; modifying the Water Law; modifying recycling provisions; providing for state parks and trails license plates; providing for establishment of Invasive Terrestrial Plants and Pests Center; providing for licensing commercial breeders of dogs and cats; providing for adoption of research dogs and cats; modifying provisions governing Health Department, Department of Human Services, health care, children and family services, Northstar Care for Children program, community first services and supports, continuing care, home and community-based services standards, public assistance programs simplification, and chemical and mental health services; making changes to hospital payment system; providing rate and grant increases for nursing facilities, ICFs/DD, and home and community-based services; requiring studies and reports; requiring rulemaking.
313	May 30, 2014	An act relating to legislative enactments; correcting miscellaneous oversights, inconsistencies, ambiguities, unintended results, and technical errors.
