= Kemsky =

Kemsky (masculine), Kemskaya (feminine), or Kemskoye (neuter) may refer to:

- Kemsky District, a district of the Republic of Karelia, Russia
- Kemsky Uyezd (1785–1927), a former administrative division of the Russian Empire and early Russian SFSR
- Kemskoye Urban Settlement, a municipal formation which the town of Kem and three rural localities in Kemsky District of the Republic of Karelia, Russia are incorporated as
- Kemsky (family), a princely family of Rurikid stock

== See also ==
- Kem (disambiguation)
