= Kempny =

Kempny (feminine: Kempna) is a Polish surname. Kempný (feminine: Kempná) is a Czech surname. As a Polish surname, it may be derived as an adjective from the word kempa (either a regional form or phonetic rendering of kępa), ' clump of vegetation' or 'small island overgrown with vegetation'. As a Czech surname, it may be derived either from kampa ('land/island protruding from the water', meaning that the bearer lived on kampa), or from the German surnames Kempa, Kempe. Notable people with the surname include:

- Henryk Kempny (1934–2016), Polish footballer
- Michal Kempný (born 1990), Czech ice hockey player
- Peter Kempny (1862–1906), Austrian physician
