= Chemo (disambiguation) =

Chemo is a prefix meaning chemical and commonly used as an abbreviation for chemotherapy.

Chemo may also refer to:

== People ==
- Chemo (musician), an English musician now known as Forest DLG
- Chemo Soto, a Puerto Rican politician
- José del Solar, nicknamed "Chemo", a Peruvian retired footballer who played as a defensive midfielder, and a current coach

== Arts, entertainment, and media ==
- Chemo (album), or The Chemo, an album working title used by Busta Rhymes
- Chemo (character), a supervillain comics character
- Blondell Wayne Tatum, a recurring character in novels by Carl Hiaasen, nicknamed "Chemo" for his grotesque appearance
- Chemo Hero, a song by Dolly Parton

== See also ==
- Chem (disambiguation)
