= Jerry's Foods =

American grocery store chain

Jerry's Enterprises, Inc
- Company type: Private company
- Industry: Retail
- Genre: Supermarket
- Founded: 1947
- Founder: Gerald A. Paulsen
- Headquarters: Edina, Minnesota, United States
- Number of locations: 6
- Area served: Twin Cities; Wisconsin; Florida
- Key people: Ben Schultes; President
- Products: Bakery, dairy, deli, frozen foods, general grocery, meat, pharmacy, produce, seafood, snacks, liquor
- Revenue: US$965 Million (2019)
- Divisions: Jerry's Foods (6); Cub (17); Save-a-Lot (16); Do It Best (5); Rainbow Foods (1, Closed 2019)
- Website: jerrysfoods.com

Previous logo

Jerry's Enterprises, Inc. (JEI) is an operator of County Market, Cub Foods, Jerry's Foods, and Save-a-Lot grocery stores headquartered in Edina, Minnesota. It was founded in 1947 by CEO Gerald A. (Jerry) Paulsen.

Jerry's Foods is the largest Cub Foods franchise in the United States, with 3 retail supermarkets in the Twin Cities, and 1 in Sanibel, Florida.

JEI also owns four liquor stores (two operating as Cub Liquor), five hardware stores and two print shops, as well as additional property interests.

== Acquisitions ==
In 2004, JEI expanded into Wisconsin with the purchase of two County Market stores from Hudson businessman Dick Schmitz, for an undisclosed price. In 2014, it purchased seven Rainbow Foods stores from Roundy's, a Milwaukee company. Four were converted into Cub Foods, and three remained as Rainbow Foods until they were converted or closed. All are in Minnesota.
