= Pao Houa Her =

American photographer (born 1982)

- Born: 1982 (age 43–44); Laos
- Known for: Photography
- Movement: Modernism, Feminism, Hmong, Vietnam War

Pao Houa Her (born in 1982) is a Hmong-American photographer whose works are primarily centered around the history and lived experiences of the Hmong people. Her's photography consists of greenery and geographic images. She is also a professor at the University of Minnesota and teaches Introduction to Photography.

== Early life and education ==
Her was born in Laos, where she lived until the age of three, at which time her family fled to Minnesota, where she lives today. She remembers vividly the long migration from Laos to camps in Thailand and, finally, on to St. Paul, Minnesota where Her's family settled in 1986. She graduated from Humboldt High School in 2001. As a sophomore, Her became increasingly interested in photography. She learned her art shooting film—she wouldn't start working in a digital format until graduate school. She started at Inver Hills Community College before transferring to the Minneapolis College of Art and Design. Her received a bachelor's of fine arts in photography from the Minneapolis College of Art and Design in 2009. In 2012, she received a master's of fine arts in photography from the Yale School of Art in New Haven, Connecticut.

== Work ==
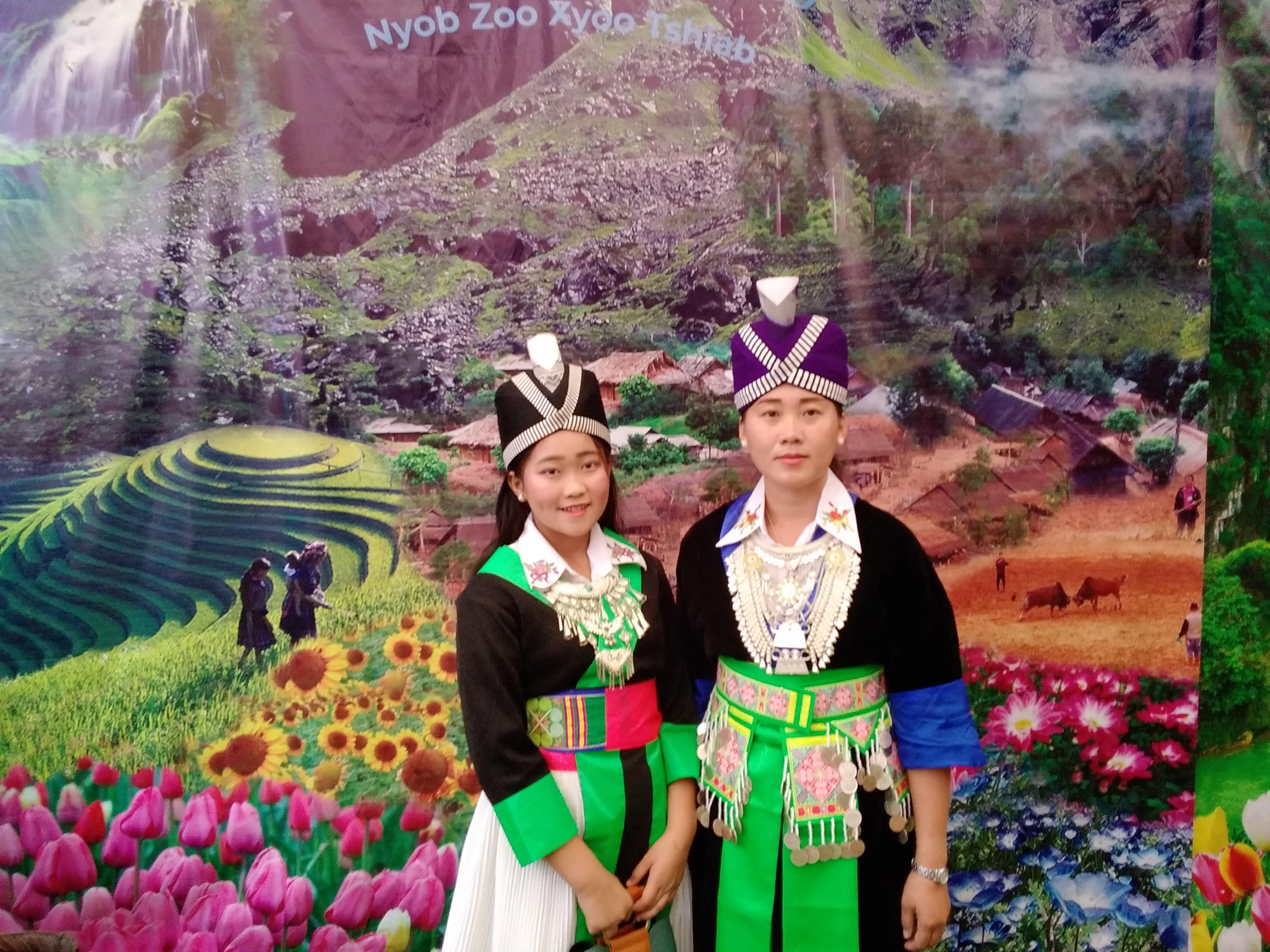
Hmong-style portrait in traditional dress, the style that Her's portraits draw on

Her combines images that range from her life in Laos that include ancient large stone jars with burial sites to portraits of the elderly. The artist's image backgrounds range from empty studio back drops to plastic flowers. Her often arranges her photographs in groups and series to both suggest and disrupt narrative meaning. She has stated, “I create my own homeland, a place of belonging both real and unreal, an equal product of Hmong history and my imagination.” But her photographs can also stand separately. Either way they all aim to visualize the Hmong-American narrative.

== Grants and awards ==
- Guggenheim Fellowship, John Simon Guggenheim Memorial Foundation, New York, 2023
- McKnight Visual Artist Fellowship, Minneapolis, 2022
- 3rd Place, Outwin Broochever Portrait Competition, National Portrait Gallery, Washington DC, 2022
- Light Work Artist Residency, Syracuse NY, 2019
- McKnight Visual Artists Fellowship, Minneapolis, 2016
- Jerome Fellowship for Emerging Artists, Jerome Foundation, Minneapolis Minnesota State Arts Board Artists Initiative Grant, 2013
- Alice Kimball Fellowship, Yale University School of Art, New Haven CT, 2012
- Minnesota State Arts Board Artists Initiative Grant, 2009

== Solo exhibitions ==
- Paj quam ntuj / Flowers of the Sky, curated by Victoria Sung, Walker Art Center, Minneapolis, Minnesota (Jul 23, 2022 - Jan 22, 2023)
- Emplotment, Or Gallery, Vancouver, Canada (June 2 – July 18, 2020)
- After the Fall of Hmong Tebchaw, Catherine G. Murphy Gallery, St. Paul, Minnesota (Nov 2 – December 14, 2019)
- My grandfather turned into a tiger, PLATFORM Centre, Winnipeg, Canada (Jan 11 – February 22, 2019)
- My grandfather turned into a tiger, Midway Contemporary Art, Minneapolis, Minnesota (Feb 10 – April 7, 2018)
- My Mother's Flowers, Bockley Gallery, Minneapolis, Minnesota (June 23 – July 30, 2016)
- Attention, Minneapolis Institute of Art (April 16 – June 7, 2015)
- The King's Seven Daughters, The Bindery Projects, St. Paul, Minnesota (March 21–22, 2015)
- Focus: Pao Houa Her, Eli and Edythe Broad Art Museum, East Lansing, Michigan (Jan 30 – June 7, 2015)
- Desires, Center for Hmong Studies, Minneapolis, Minnesota (March 15 – May 4, 2013)
- Pao Houa Her, Franklin Artworks, Minneapolis, Minnesota (March–May 2013)
- Somebody, The Gordon Park Gallery, curated by Wing Young Huie, St. Paul, Minnesota (September 2012)

=== "Attention" ===
"Attention" is one of Her's solo exhibitions focusing on Hmong-American veterans who fought in the Vietnam War or known as the Secret War. Hmong-American veterans were left to fight alone during the Vietnam War after the U.S. retreated in 1975, and they ignored the Hmong-American veterans after the war. "Attention" presents ten portraits of Hmong-American veterans in their uniforms and badges that they bought to protests for the recognition they deserve.

== Group exhibitions ==
- The Outwin 2022: American Portraiture Today, National Portrait Gallery, Washington DC (Apr 30, 2022 – Feb 26, 2023)
- Home, Madison Museum of Contemporary Art, Madison, Wisconsin (Jul 30, 2022 – Feb 19, 2023)
- Whitney Biennial 2022: Quiet as It’s Kept, curated by David Breslin and Adrienne Edwards, Whitney Museum of American Art, New York City (Apr 6 – Sept 5, 2022)
- Shifting Perspectives: Landscape Photography from the Collection, Milwaukee Art Museum, Milwaukee, Wisconsin (Mar 18 – Jul 3, 2022)
- Mother, Mason Exhibition, George Mason University, Arlington, Virginia (Apr 1 – May 28, 2022)
- Snake whiskey still life and other stories, curated by Todd Bockley, Various Small Fires, Los Angeles (Jan 15 – Feb 19, 2022)
- The Regional, Contemporary Arts Center, Cincinnati, Ohio (Dec 10, 2021 – Mar 20, 2022)
- The Regional, Kemper Museum of Contemporary Art, Kansas City, Missouri (Jun 2 – Sept 11, 2021)
- Midway Off-Site: Pao Houa Her and Tetsuya Yamada, Midway Contemporary Art at Hmongtown Marketplace, St. Paul, Minnesota (Oct 10 – Dec 19, 2020)
- Phantoms and Aliens | The Invisible Other, curated by Loredana Paracciani, Richard Kho Gallery, Singapore (Mar 6 – Mar 28, 2020)
- The American War, ARTS at King Street Station, Seattle, Washington (Feb 6 – Mar 21, 2020)
- Rethinking Histories: Works from MIA’s Collection, Minneapolis Institute of Art, Minneapolis, Minnesota (Aug 24, 2019 – Jan 19, 2020)
- Artist Reflect: Contemporary Views on American War, Minneapolis Institute of Art, Minneapolis, Minnesota (Sept 29, 2019 – Jan 5, 2020)
- Depths, Elevations Laos Biennial, curated by Erin Gleeson, Sin Many, i:cat Gallery, Ban Simeuang, Vientiane, Laos (November 9, 2018 – January 16, 2019)
- EXit/ EXile/ EXodus: Voicing the Diaspora in Southeast Asian Contemporary Art, curated by Loredana Pazzini-Paracciani, MAIIAM, Chiang Mai, Thailand (March 4, 2018 – March 3, 2019)
- in(di)visible, Station Museum of Contemporary Art, Houston, Texas (Feb 3 – April 22, 2018)
- On Attachments and Unknowns, SA SA BASSAC, curated by Erin Gleeson, May Adadol Ingawanij, Ben Valentine, Phnom Penh, Cambodia (May 19 – August 19, 2017)
- Reframe Minnesota: Art Beyond a Single Story, All My Relations Gallery, Minneapolis (June 24 – September 16, 2016)
- Migration Series No. 1, Telemark Art Center, Skien, Norway (Sept 26 – November 1, 2015)
- What Remains, Museum of Contemporary Photography, Chicago (Jan 26 – March 22, 2015)
- The 2014 Jerome Fellowship Exhibition, Minneapolis College of Art and Design (Oct 3 – November 9, 2014)
- Swerve and Fracture, Camera Club of New York, New York City (Sept 14 – Nov 2 ,2013)
- After the Fall, Garis and Hahn Gallery, New York City (Jan 11 – February 16, 2012)
- Group Portrait, Edger Varala Gallery, New York City (Sept 8 – October 14, 2012)
- Group Portrait, Ana Tzarev Gallery, New York (June 28 – July 21, 2012)
- Yale MFA Thesis, Green Hall Gallery, New Haven CT (May 2012)
- Foot in the Door, Minneapolis Institute of Art (Feb 19 – June 13, 2010)
- New Direction in Hmong Arts, Homewood Gallery, Minneapolis (July 2009)
- Relative Distance, Center for Independent Artists, Minneapolis (January 2009)
- Journey Through The Lense, Hennepin Government Center, Minneapolis (October 2008)
- All Things Relative, A4 Gallery, Boston (October 2008)
- Remix: Intergenerational Hmong Art Exhibition, Homewood Gallery, Minneapolis, Minnesota (July 2008)
