= Ernest A. Beedle =

American politician (1933–1968)

Member of the Minnesota House of Representatives
- In office January 6, 1959 – January 2, 1967
- Constituency: 46th district (1963–1967); 39th district (1959–1963)

Personal details
- Born: August 31, 1933 Minnesota, U.S.
- Died: January 31, 1968 (aged 34) Dakota County, Minnesota, U.S.
- Spouse: Carrie B. Beedle
- Children: 2
- Education: Humboldt Senior High School; Hamline University (BA); William Mitchell College of Law (BS)
- Profession: Politician, lawyer

Military service
- Allegiance: United States
- Branch/service: Minnesota Air National Guard; Air Force Reserve Command

Ernest A. Beedle (August 31, 1933 – January 31, 1968) was an American politician and lawyer who served in the Minnesota House of Representatives from 1959 to 1967, representing the 39th and 46th legislative districts of Minnesota.

== Early life and education ==
Beedle was born in Minnesota on August 31, 1933. (Note: Beedle's death certificate indicates that he was born in August.) He graduated from Humboldt Senior High School.

Beedle obtained a Bachelor of Arts degree in Political Science and History from Hamline University. He also obtained a law degree from William Mitchell College of Law.

== Career ==
Beedle served in the 47th infantry division of the Minnesota Air National Guard. He also served in the Air Force Reserve Command.

Beedle served in the Minnesota House of Representatives from 1959 to 1967. He represented the 39th legislative district of Minnesota from 1959 to 1963 before representing the 46th legislative district of Minnesota from 1963 to 1967.

During his time in office, Beedle served on the following committees.

- Aircraft and Airways (1959–1960)
- Cities of the First and Second Class (1959–1960)
- Commerce, Manufacturing and Retail Trade (1959–1960)
- Judiciary (1959–1966)
- Welfare (1959–1962)
- Commercial Transportation and Communications (1961–1962)
- Elections (1961–1962)
- Game and Fish (1961–1962)
- Health and Welfare (1963–1966)
- Insurance (1963–1966)
- Law Enforcement and Juvenile Delinquency (1963–1966)
- State and Junior Colleges (1963–1964)
- Metropolitan and Urban Affairs (1965–1966)

Beedle's time in office began on January 6, 1959, and concluded on January 2, 1967. He represented Ramsey County in the 61st, 62nd, 63rd, and 64th Minnesota Legislatures.

Beedle was a member of the liberal caucus.

Beedle was an alternate delegate to the Democratic National Convention from Minnesota in 1960.

Outside of the Minnesota Legislature, Beedle was a lawyer with his own law firm, Beedle Law Firm.

== Personal life and death ==
Beedle was married and had two children, both sons. He resided in Saint Paul, Minnesota.

Beedle died at the age of 34 in Dakota County, Minnesota, on January 31, 1968.

== Notes ==
Minnesota House of Representatives
Preceded by —	Member of the Minnesota House of Representatives from the 39th district 1959–1963	Succeeded by —
Minnesota House of Representatives
Preceded by —	Member of the Minnesota House of Representatives from the 46th district 1963–1967	Succeeded by —
