= Sid Applebaum =

American businessman

- Born: Sidney Applebaum; February 28, 1924; St. Paul, Minnesota, U.S.
- Died: August 6, 2016 (aged 92); Minnetonka, Minnesota, U.S.
- Occupation: American Businessman

Sidney "Sid" Applebaum (February 28, 1924 – August 6, 2016) was an American businessman, the cofounder of Rainbow Foods.

== Biography ==
Sidney Applebaum was born in Saint Paul, Minnesota, on February 28, 1924, to Oscar and Bertha Applebaum. He was the youngest son and eighth child of nine. His parents immigrated to the United States from Russia on their honeymoon. Oscar Applebaum sold produce door-to-door in St. Paul from a horse-drawn wagon. Oscar opened a fruit stand on the corner of St. Peter and 7th Streets with a $65 loan from his eldest son. It became the first Applebaum's Food Market. As a boy, Sid bundled soap, bagged rice, worked as a box boy, and delivered fruit and produce for the fruit stand. Applebaum graduated from Humboldt Senior High School in St. Paul and continued to grow the family business.

By 1979, the family business included about 30 metro-area Applebaum's stores and one in Duluth. In 1979, the chain was sold to National Tea, and Applebaum continued working for them. The chain was subsequently sold to Wisconsin-based Gateway Foods. Applebaum and Gateway Foods CEO D. B. Reinhart grew the chain to become the second-largest grocery chain in the Minneapolis–Saint Paul area by embracing Applebaum's idea to launch Rainbow Foods by converting some of the Applebaum stores to the new brand. The chain was founded on October 1, 1983.

Applebaum was president of Rainbow Foods through several ownership changes until 1996. In 1997, Applebaum bought four Holiday Foods stores in Bloomington, Fridley, Plymouth, and Burnsville. Eighteen months later, the stores were sold to Supervalu and converted to Cub Foods stores.

In his final days, Applebaum became ill and used a walker, but he worked until less than a week before his death in Minnetonka on August 6, 2016, aged 92. Applebaum and his wife, Lorraine, would have celebrated their 70th wedding anniversary on September 17, 2016. He was survived by his wife, three children, eight grandchildren, and five great-grandchildren.
