= Kemetic =

Kemetic may refer to:

- Relating to Kemet, or ancient Egypt
- Ancient Egyptian language
- A follower of Kemetism

== See also ==
- Kemet (disambiguation)
