= Kem =

Kem or KEM may refer to:

== People ==
- Kem (singer) (born 1969), R&B musician
- Kem Cetinay (born 1996), English television personality
- Kem Smith, American politician

== Places ==
- Kem (river), a river in the Republic of Karelia, Russia
- Kem (Yenisey), a river in Siberia, Russia
- Kem, Russia, a town in the Republic of Karelia, Russia
- Kem, an alternative name for Cham-e Mahavi, a village in Khuzestan Province, Iran
- Kem', a crater on Mars
- King Edward Mine, a tin mine in Cornwall, United Kingdom

== Transportation ==
- Kemble railway station (National Rail station code: KEM), Gloucestershire, England
- Kemi-Tornio Airport (IATA: KEM), Finland

== Other ==
- Kem, brand of playing cards by United States Playing Card Company
- Key encapsulation mechanism, a type of public-key cryptosystem for confidentially transporting a random secret key
- Kem (drink), a soft drink from Chile

== See also ==
- Cem
- Chem (disambiguation)
- Kemi, a town and a municipality in Finland
- Kemp (disambiguation)
