= Kemp =

Kemp may refer to:

== Places ==
- Kemp, Illinois
- Kemp, Ohio
- Kemp, Oklahoma
- Kemp, Texas
- Kemp Land and Kemp Coast, Antarctica
- Kemp Town, a 19th-century estate in East Sussex, England
- Kemps Corner, place in India

== People ==
- Kemp (surname)
- Kemp Hannon, American politician
- Kemp Strickler, American politician
- Te Keepa Te Rangihiwinui (c. 1820–98), also known as Major Kemp, Māori military leader

== Other uses ==
- "Kemp" (song), a song appearing on Home From Home by Millencolin
- Kemp (wool), a type of sheep's hair
- Kemp Technologies, a networking appliances company

== See also ==
- Kem (disambiguation)
