= Arnold E. Kempe =

American lawyer and politician (1927–2022)

Arnold E. Kempe (January 23, 1927 – July 22, 2022) was an American politician and lawyer.

Kempe graduated from Humboldt Senior High School in Saint Paul, Minnesota. He lived in West St. Paul, Minnesota with his wife and family. Kempe served in the United States Marine Corps during World War II. Kempe received his bachelor's degree from the University of Minnesota and his Juris Doctor degree from the University of Minnesota Law School. He was admitted to the Minnesota bar. Kempe served as mayor of West St. Paul, Minnesota from 1958 to 1963 and as West St. Paul City Attorney from 1964 to 1974. Kempe served in the Minnesota House of Representatives from 1975 to 1978 and was a Democrat. His brother Raymond J. Kempe also served in the Minnesota Legislature.
