= David Kemp =

David or Dave Kemp may refer to:

- David Kemp (parasitologist) (1945–2013), plant geneticist and parasitologist
- David Kemp (cyclist) (born 1984), Australian former road bicycle race
- David Kemp (physicist) (born 1945), British physicist, discoverer of otoacoustic emission
- David Kemp (politician) (born 1941), Australian politician
- Dave Kemp (born 1953), English footballer and manager

== See also ==
- Davie Kemp (born 1950), Scottish footballer
