= Jeka Kemp =

British artist (1876–1966)

- Born: Jacobina Kemp; 1876; Bellahouston, Glasgow
- Died: 1966 (aged 89–90); Eastbourne, England
- Education: Academie Julian
- Known for: Painting

Jacobina Kemp (1876–1966), known as Jeka Kemp, was a Scottish artist who was known for her woodcut and watercolour paintings of European landscapes and street scenes.

== Biography ==
Kemp was born in the Bellahouston district of Glasgow and appears to have been largely self-taught as an artist but may have taken lessons in London before spending 1903 and 1904 in Paris where she attended the Academie Julian. After leaving Paris, Kemp travelled widely and spent time in the Netherlands, Italy and north Africa. She showed some landscape paintings of France at a group show in Glasgow in 1907 and subsequently exhibited with the Glasgow Society of Lady Artists, the Royal Glasgow Institute of the Fine Arts and the Royal Scottish Academy. She often painted figures on beaches and interior scenes bathed in light, particularly from the south of France. From 1912 to 1914 Kemp had a number of solo exhibitions at Macindoe's Gallery in Glasgow and also exhibited with the Société Nationale des Beaux-Arts in Paris from 1912 with a number of her works being purchased by the French government.

Kemp worked in Paris hospitals as a nurse-masseuse throughout World War I. After the war she remained in France and had solo exhibitions at the Marcel Bernheim Gallery in Paris and at Warneuke's in Glasgow and also at the Galerie de la Libraire de la Presse in Nantes in 1922. Kemp gave up painting around 1927 and remained in France until 1939 when she returned to Britain to live with her sisters in Dorset and later Eastbourne. Retrospective exhibitions of her paintings in 1977 revived interest in Kemp.
