= Raymond J. Kempe =

American lawyer

Raymond J. Kempe (born January 24, 1931) was an American lawyer and politician.

Kempe was born in Saint Paul, Minnesota and went to Humboldt Senior High School in Saint Paul. While attending Humboldt, he was a forward on the 1949 Minnesota State High School League Championship Basketball team. He scored eight points during the game. He lived in West St. Paul, Minnesota with his wife and seven children. Kempe received his bachelor's degree from University of Minnesota and his Juris Doctor degree from University of Minnesota Law School. Kempe was admitted to the Minnesota bar. Kempe served in the Minnesota House of Representatives from 1973 to 1980 and was a Democrat. He was a member of the Minnesota Zoological Society. His brother Arnold E. Kempe also served in the Minnesota Legislature.
