= Haydn Kemp =

English footballer

Personal information
- Full name: Haydn Kemp
- Date of birth: 17 January 1897
- Place of birth: Mosborough, England
- Date of death: 1982 (aged 84–85)
- Position: Wing half

Senior career*
Years	Team	Apps	(Gls)
1912–1913	New Bolsover Wesleyans		
1913–1914	Staveley West End		
1914–1918	Anston United		
1918	Bolsover Colliery		
1918	Bolsover Town		
1919–1920	Chesterfield Municipal		
1920–1931	Notts County	286	(6)
1931–1932	Thames	28	(2)
1932–1933	Grantham		
1933	Heanor Town		
Total		314	(8)
- * Club domestic league appearances and goals

Haydn Kemp (17 January 1897 – 1982) was an English footballer who played in the Football League for Notts County and Thames.
