= Jan Kemp =

Jan Kemp may refer to:

- Jan Kemp (general) (1872–1946), South African Boer officer, rebel general, and politician
- Jan Kemp (writer) (born 1949), New Zealand writer
- Jan Kemp (academic) (1949–2008), American academic and English tutor
