= Kemet =

Kemet or kmt may refer to:

- km.t, a variant of an Egyptian hieroglyph taken to be a name of Egypt; see Km and Km.t (Kemet) (hieroglyphs)
- KEMET Corporation, American capacitor manufacturer
- Kemetism, revivals of the ancient Egyptian religion
- Kmt (magazine), an academic journal of ancient Egypt
- A fictional compound for protecting against dragon fire, in the 1984 book The Hero and the Crown by Robin McKinley
- Sons of Kemet, a British jazz group formed in 2011

== See also ==
- Kemetic (disambiguation)
- Km (hieroglyph)
