= Annerose Kemp =

German educator (1936–2013)

- Born: Annerose Helene Weber; August 20, 1936; Leipzig-Wiederitzsch
- Died: December 9, 2013 (aged 77); Leipzig, Saxony, Germany

Annerose Kemp (August 20, 1936, in Leipzig-Wiederitzsch – December 9, 2013, in Leipzig) was a German educator, director of studies at the Henriette-Goldschmidt-Schule and co-founder of the Louise-Otto-Peters-Gesellschaft. From the end of the 1970s, she carried out extensive research on Henriette Goldschmidt, including her influence on the Leipzig women's education movement as well as the Hochschule für Frauen and its subsequent institutions.

== Life and work ==
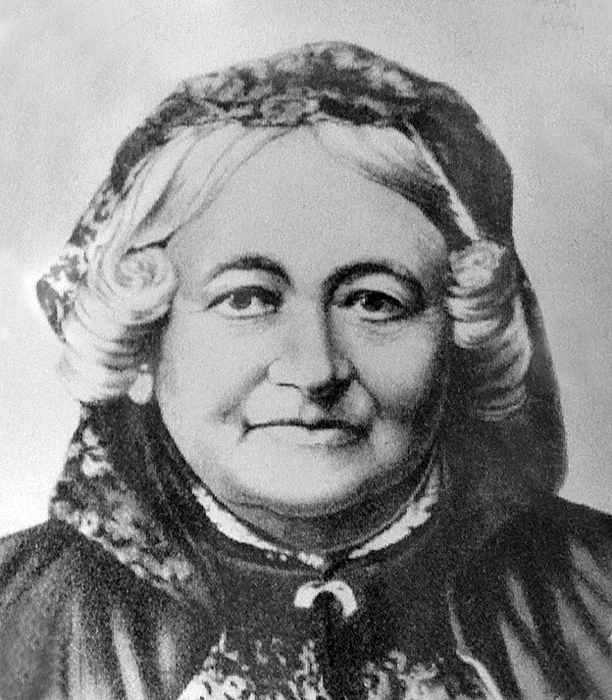
Henriette Goldschmidt

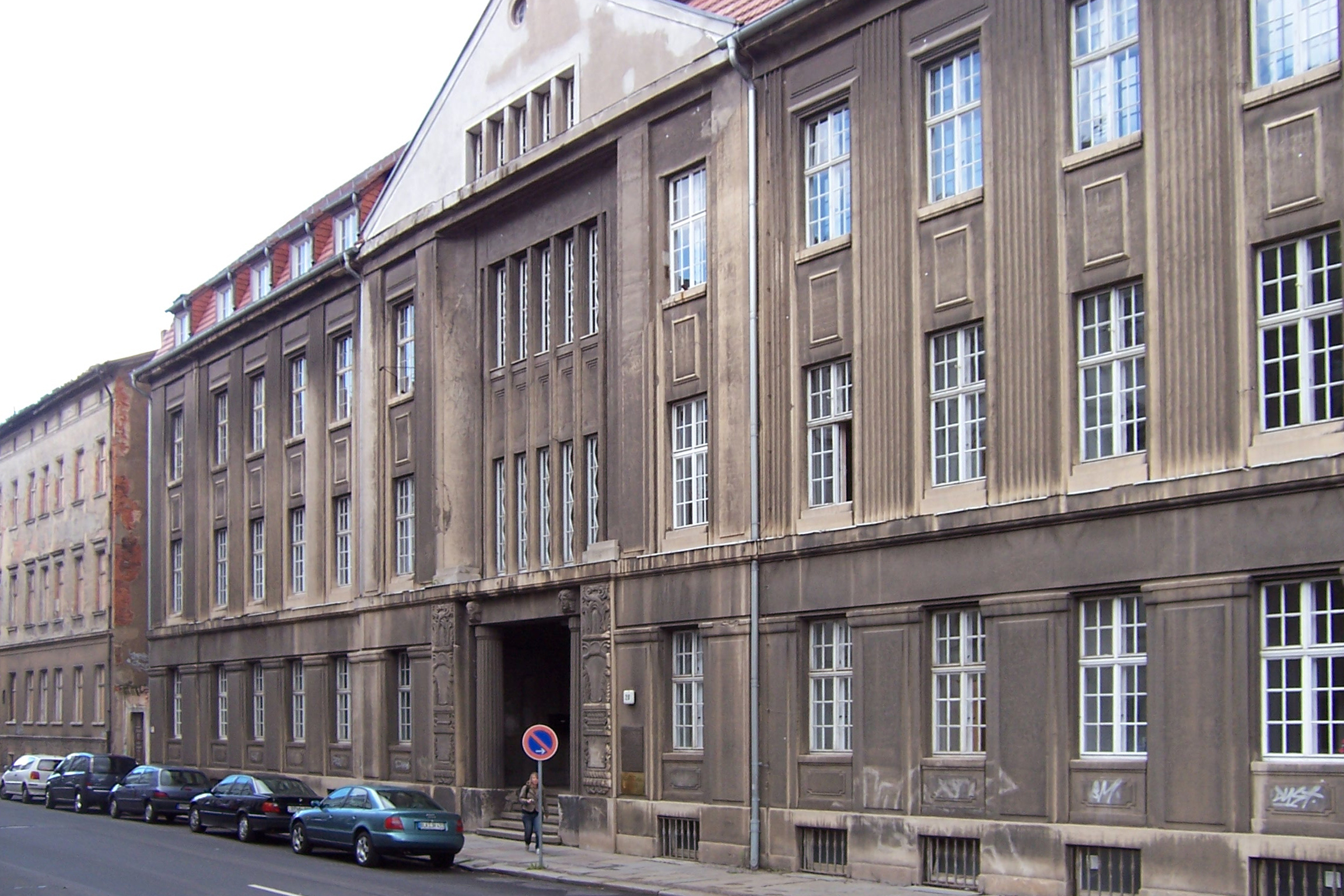
Goldschmidt-Schule in Leipzig

After completing her training as a kindergarten teacher, Annerose Kemp was employed as a lecturer for pedagogy and methodology of preschool education at the Pädagogische Schule Leipzig. After training as a nursery school teacher, she worked as a specialist school lecturer and later as a director of studies in the pedagogy department at the Henriette-Goldschmidt-Schule in Leipzig. During this time, she deepened her interest in Goldschmidt's pedagogical approaches and intensively studied her life and work. Kemp also studied the life and work of the important Fröbel pedagogue Henriette Goldschmidt intensively outside of her professional commitments. Goldschmidt's influence on the Leipzig women's education movement and the Hochschule für Frauen as well as its successor institutions were further focal points of her research.

Another focus of Kemp's research was the genealogy of the Goldschmidt families and the music publisher and founder Henri Hinrichsen, which are closely linked to the history of Leipzig. She published several articles and lectures on this subject. Her work in this field helped to keep the memory of these important families and their contributions to Leipzig's cultural and educational history alive.

As co-founder of the Louise-Otto-Peters-Gesellschaft (LOP), she has made a lasting contribution through her research on Henriette Goldschmidt and her tireless commitment to the preservation of women's history sites in the city of Leipzig and beyond. Together with the LOP, she fought for years to preserve the Henriette Goldschmidt House in Leipzig, which was demolished in March 2000, the year of Henriette Goldschmidt's 175th birthday.

After her death in 2013, her research documents and notes were included in the collection of the Dubnow Institute for Jewish History and Culture at the University of Leipzig. Kemp's research estate has since been accessible in the institute's library and offers interested parties an insight into her work and her commitment to researching Henriette Goldschmidt's educational legacy.

== Works ==
- with Eberhard Ulm: Henriette-Goldschmidt-Schule 1911–2001. Henriette-Goldschmidt-Schule

Beiträge

- Henriette Goldschmidt, Vom Frauenrecht zur Kindererziehung. In: Judaica Lipsensia. Zur Geschichte der Juden in Leipzig. Hrsg. Ephraim Carlebach Stiftung, Edition Leipzig 1994, ISBN 3-361-00423-3, S. 33–53.
- Leipzigs Frauen gehörten einst mehrere Häuser. In: Was Frauen bewegte, was Frauen bewegt. LOUISEum 8 Louise-Otto-Peters-Gesellschaft 1998, S. 69–78.
- Kemp, Annerose (1999). "Henriette Goldschmidt". In Hervé, Florence; Nördinger, Ingeborg (eds.). Lexikon der Rebellinnen: Von A bis Z. Econ. ISBN 3-612-26657-8.
- „Wir haben Väter der Stadt, wo bleiben die Mütter?“ zum Wirken von Henriette Goldschmidt. In: Hans-Martin Moderow, Steffen Held: Bildung, Studium und Erwerbstätigkeit von Frauen in Leipzig im 19. und frühen 20. Jahrhundert. Sax-Verlag, Beucha 2002, ISBN 3-934544-23-1.
- with Horst Kemp: Henriette Goldschmidt – ein Glücksfall für Leipzig. In: Johanna Ludwig, Gerlinde Kämmerer, Susanne Schötz: Henriette Goldschmidt und die Hochschule für Frauen zu Leipzig. Berichte vom 19. Louise-Otto-Peters-Tag 2011, LOUISEum 32 online einsehbar via www.louiseottopeters-gesellschaft.de PDF
