= Robert S. Kemp =

American professor and academic

Robert "Bob" S. Kemp is a Ramon W. Breeden, Sr, Research Professor, Emeritus, in the McIntire School of Commerce at the University of Virginia, where he has taught for over 30 years. He is a respected member of the finance department faculty and is trusted in areas such as finance, pension funds, and financial statement analysis. His work has been published in The Australian Financial Review, Journal of Financial Research, Advances in Accounting, Benefits Quarterly, Journal of Mathematics Applied in Business and Industry, Journal of Accountancy, Journal of Commercial Bank Lending, The Journal of Bank Accounting and Auditing, and Journal of Business Economics.

== Education ==
Robert "Bob" S. Kemp earned an M.B.A in Finance and Accounting from Florida State University, followed by a D.B.A. in Finance and Accounting from Florida State University. He also earned his B.S. in Finance and Accounting from FSU. Bob Kemp possesses a baccalaureate, masters, and doctorate in business administration. He is a certified CPA in Virginia, Georgia, and AICPA.

== Experience ==
Bob Kemp has worked with a variety of organizations throughout his time in the business community. He has worked with such companies as Citibank, J. P. Morgan/Chase, Bank of America, the FDIC, NTA, AICPA, the Siberian Banking Institute, KPMG, the Russian Bankers Association, and Ernst & Young. During his time at the University of Virginia, following his professional career, Professor Bob Kemp has served as the head of the McIntire's finance faculty, the McIntire Associate Dean for Graduate Program, and has chaired numerous schools and university committees. He is currently the chair elect of the University of Virginia's faculty senate
