= Rainbow Foods =

Defunct American supermarket chain

- Type: Subsidiary (1994–2018), Private (1983–1994)
- Industry: Retail, Grocery
- Founded: October 1, 1983; 43 years ago
- Defunct: September 17, 2018; 8 years ago
- Headquarters: Stillwater, Minnesota
- Products: Bakery, dairy, deli, frozen foods, grocery, meat, pharmacy, produce, seafood, snacks
- Parent: SuperValu (2014–2018), Roundy's (2003–2014), Fleming Companies (1994–2003)
- Website: Archived official website at the Wayback Machine (archived February 12, 2014)

Rainbow Foods was a supermarket chain in Minnesota. Founded in 1983, it operated more than 40 stores across the state at its peak and was the second-largest grocery store chain in the Twin Cities, behind Cub Foods. However, the arrival of other grocery stores in the market, such as Aldi and Hy-Vee in the 2000s and 2010s caused the grocery store chain to shrink to 27 locations by May 2014. Soon after, nine more closed and eighteen were sold by then-owner Roundy's; only six of these kept the Rainbow name.

== History ==
Rainbow Foods was founded by Sid Applebaum and D. B. Reinhart of Gateway Foods in 1983 and grew to become the second-largest grocery chain in the Minneapolis–Saint Paul area. The chain was sold to Texas-based wholesaler Fleming Companies in 1994. During the 1990s, Rainbow built several stores in the Minneapolis–Saint Paul suburbs. After the sale to Roundys in 2003, Rainbow began opening Leeann Chin restaurants in its stores, starting with the Maple Grove and Bloomington stores in July 2004; over the next couple of years, Leeann Chin opened 10 restaurants inside Rainbow Foods stores; by 2007, however, they were down to just two locations, which eventually closed.

== Decline ==
The decline of Rainbow Foods arguably started in 2000, when Fleming put Rainbow and several other chains up for sale. At the time, possible buyers of Rainbow Foods included grocery giants Kroger, Safeway and Albertsons. Albertsons was very close to buying Rainbow Foods, but backed out of the deal. Fleming Companies announced in April 2003 that it had filed for reorganization under Chapter 11 bankruptcy. When Fleming sold Rainbow Foods in 2003, Albertsons was a Rainbow suitor, but backed out again.

In 2003, Fleming Companies decided to sell 31 of the chains leases to Milwaukee based Roundys for 82.5 million dollars. Fleming decided to close the remaining 12 locations it had owned and pull out of the chain all together. In a surprise move on May 7, 2014, Roundys announced that it had sold 18 of its Rainbow Foods stores to a consortium of area competitors and businesses for 65 million dollars. These competitors were Lunds and Byerlys, SuperValu owner of Cub Foods, the number one grocery store in Minnesota, Jerry's Enterprises, Haug Enterprises, and Radermacher Enterprises.

The company could not find a bidder for nine of the remaining stores it owned and they all closed on July 22, 2014.
The stores that were purchased by the consortium were converted into Cub and Lunds and Byerlys, while six remained Rainbow locations owned by the various members of the consortium.

In September 2014, four months after buying the Rainbow Foods location in West St. Paul, supermarket owner Jerry's Enterprises said it now planned to close the store in November. In a letter sent to the city, Jerry's said the company had "developed plans based on business considerations" to close its Rainbow store at 1660 S. Robert St. The Rainbow on Minneapolis' Lake Street was also slated to close, Jerry's said. The stores joined nine other Rainbow supermarkets that were shut down in July, 2014, after Rainbow's owner Roundys left the Twin Cities market. After the closures the brand only had four remaining stores.

The two Rainbow Foods stores on Lake Street and on Robert Street were said to close by November 9, 2014. After the closures there were only four Rainbow stores left. Another Rainbow store, in Plymouth, was converted into a Cub in July 2016, which closed two years later and is now a Hy-Vee store. After this conversion, three Rainbow foods remained. On September 21, 2017, the Rainbow Foods at the Midway Shopping Center in St. Paul closed. It closed due to a soccer stadium being built on the property, requiring the existing store and part of the mall to be demolished. Sometime in 2019, Five Below, Xperience Fitness, and Salons by JC opened in the vacant space left by Rainbow Foods since 2014 Apple Valley Square shopping center.

The Richfield HUB location off 66th street closed in March 2018, leaving one remaining Rainbow location in Maplewood. On September 14, 2018, it was announced that the Rainbow Foods in Maplewood, would close on Monday, September 17, officially marking the end of Rainbow Foods after 35 years; its building was converted into a Hy-Vee, which opened in June 2021. At the time of its closing, the Maplewood Rainbow was owned and operated by SuperValu, which also owned the Cub across the street.
