= College Possible =

Nonprofitable AmeriCorps organization

- Founded: 2000
- Founded at: St. Paul, Minnesota
- Type: Nonprofit
- Purpose: Higher education
- Location: Saint Paul, MN
- Region served: Chicago Minnesota; Omaha; Oregon; Texas; Washington state Wisconsin
- Method: Provides students college-preparation counseling
- CEO: Siva Kumari
- Website: https://collegepossible.org/

College Possible (formerly Admission Possible) is a nonprofit AmeriCorps organization that aids students from low-income backgrounds in gaining admission to and graduating from college. Its model uses a combination of full-time advising specialists as well as recent college graduates serving an AmeriCorps term of service as near-peer mentors. Students receive individualized support for a minimum of six years, from junior year of high school through college graduation. Headquartered in Saint Paul, Minnesota, the organization serves students in all 50 states with offices located in the Minneapolis-Saint Paul metro area, Chicago, Milwaukee, Omaha, Portland, Seattle, and Austin.

== History ==
College Possible was chartered as a nonprofit in September 2000, beginning operations in two Twin Cities public high schools the next spring. By the 2008-09 school year, the organization was serving students in seventeen high schools across Minneapolis-Saint Paul and launched a second site in Milwaukee. In the spring of 2015, College Possible launched an additional site in Chicago, Illinois. In the summer of 2019, College Access Now merged with College Possible to become College Possible Washington. In 2023, College Forward merged with College Possible to become College Possible Texas.

During the 2023–24 school year, College Possible served more than 25,000 students at hundreds of high schools, colleges and universities across the country.

== Programming ==
A New York Times article from November 2005 quotes CEO Jim McCorkell as saying: "My starting idea was what if we replicated Kaplan for poor kids." To be eligible for College Possible's free services, students must come from low-income families and have a GPA of 2.0 or higher. High school students accepted into the program participate in after-school sessions over their junior and senior years, with time divided between test preparation, college applications, financial aid applications and preparing to transition to college.

College students receive guidance in finding and accessing campus resources, renewing the FAFSA, locating internships, maintaining a healthy balance between homework and social obligations, as well as when transferring schools.

College Possible partners with Bloomberg Philanthropies to offer virtual advising for high-achieving students from low-income communities gain admission to top colleges.

== Evaluation ==
College Possible is a 501(c)3 organization that has received a four-star rating from Charity Navigator for financial management and a three-star rating for accountability and transparency.

A 2011 Harvard study determined that Admission Possible more than doubles the chances a low-income student will enroll in a four-year institution. A later 2013 Harvard study found College Possible to have a significant positive impact on four-year college enrollment, though it had no statistically significant effect on ACT scores.

Wilder Research, an arm of the Amherst H. Wilder Foundation, performed an evaluation of Admission Possible in 2006, substantiating its claim that 91% of the organization's students enrolled in college, and that it compared favorably to similar programs.

The Charities Review Council deems that it "meets all standards".

== Recognition ==
McCorkell was named an Ashoka Fellow, a recognition for social entrepreneurship, in 2006. The organization has been recognized with awards from the Financial Times and Citi, the National Association for College Admission Counseling, College Board, and the National College Access Network.

In June 2009, President Barack Obama mentioned the organization in a speech on social entrepreneurship saying: "Admission Possible operates in just two states now. So imagine if it were 10 or 20 or 50." In February 2014, College Possible was invited to be part of a White House summit on college opportunity.

In October 2018, College Possible was the first recipient of the $125,000 Evergreen National Education Prize, awarded by the Greenwald Family Foundation to programs that "best help low-income youth access access and compete college or vocational degrees."

In September 2019, College Possible's CEO and founder, Jim McCorkell, received the Executive Leadership Award of Excellence at the National College Access Network’s annual conference. The award recognized 20 years of McCorkell’s hard work and dedication leading College Possible to expand college access for students from low-income backgrounds.
