= Metabolic panel =

Metabolic panel may refer to:

- Blood test
- Basic metabolic panel
- Comprehensive metabolic panel
