= Coon Rapids, Minnesota =

City in Minnesota, United States

Coon Rapids
- City
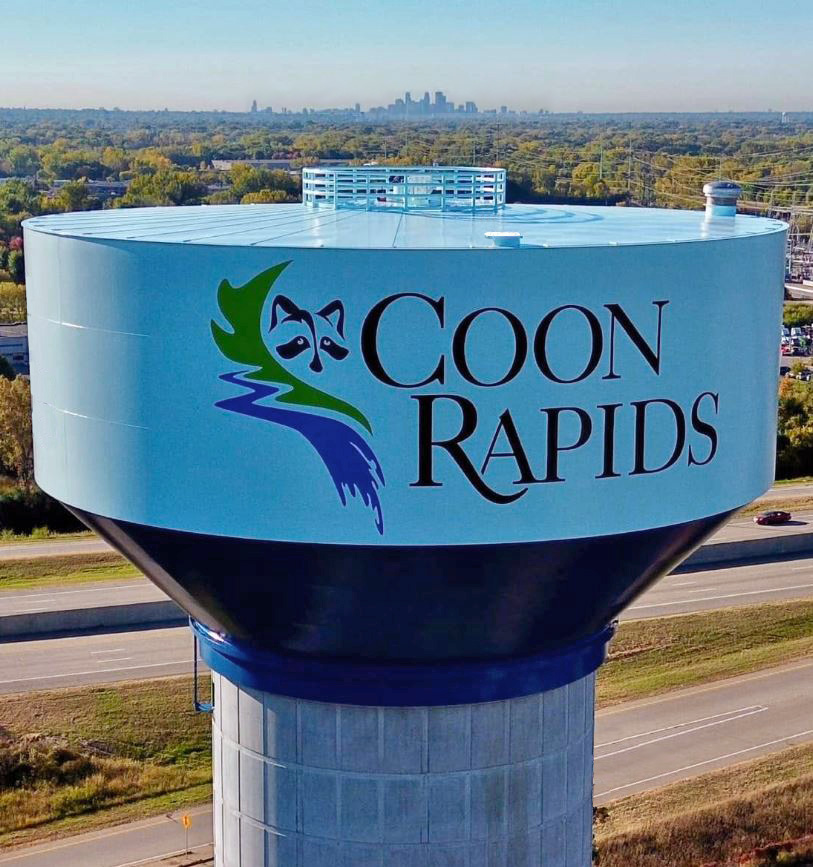
- 2024 New Coon Rapids Water Tower with Minneapolis Skyline

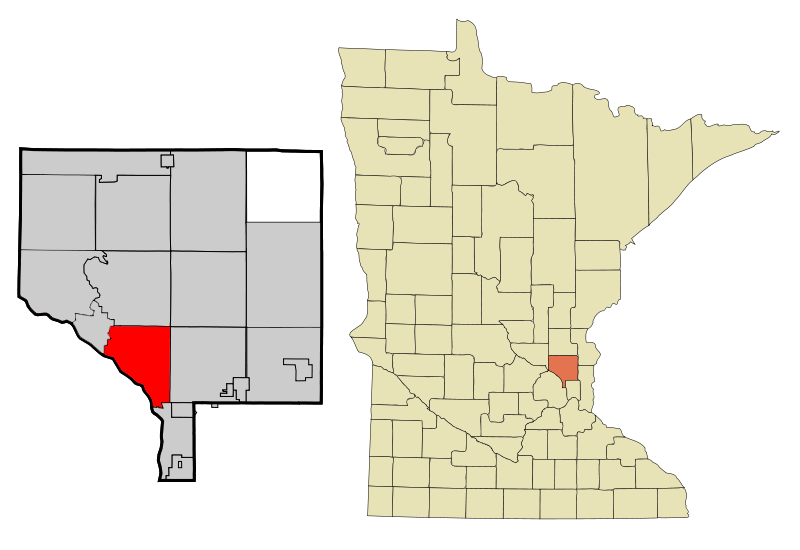
- Location of the city of Coon Rapids within Anoka County, Minnesota
- Coordinates: 45°10′20″N 93°18′15″W
- Country: United States
- State: Minnesota
- County: Anoka
- Incorporated (village): October 1952
- Incorporated (city): June 1959

Government
  - Mayor: Jerry Koch

Area
  - City: 23.33 sq mi (60.43 km^{2})
  - Land: 22.60 sq mi (58.53 km^{2})
  - Water: 0.73 sq mi (1.90 km^{2})
- Elevation: 863 ft (263 m)

Population (2020)
  - City: 63,599
  - Estimate (2022): 62,785
  - Rank: US: 616th MN: 15th
  - Density: 2,814.1/sq mi (1,086.53/km^{2})
  - Metro: 3,693,729 (US: 16th)
- Time zone: UTC-6 (Central (CST))
  - Summer (DST): UTC-5 (CDT)
- ZIP codes: 55433, 55448
- Area code: 763
- FIPS code: 27-13114
- GNIS feature ID: 2393628
- Website: coonrapidsmn.gov

Coon Rapids is a northern suburb of Minneapolis, and the second-largest city by population in Anoka County, Minnesota, United States. The population was 63,599 at the 2020 census, making it Minnesota's 15th-largest city and the seventh-largest Twin Cities suburb.

== Geography ==
According to the United States Census Bureau, the city has an area of 23.34 square miles (60.45 km^{2}), of which 22.61 square miles (58.56 km^{2}) is land and 0.73 square miles (1.89 km^{2}) is water. Recreational lakes in the city include Cenaiko Lake and Crooked Lake, two-thirds of which is in Coon Rapids. The other third is in the city of Andover, immediately to the north.

== History ==
Settlers were first attracted to the area by Coon Creek, named for the many raccoons hunted in the 19th century at the mouth of the creek.

In 1835, the Red River Ox Cart Trail was laid to establish military and trade connections between Minneapolis and Anoka. The first industries of Coon Rapids sprung up around the road, including the prominent Anoka Pressed Brick and Terra Cotta Company, founded by D. C. Dunham in 1881. The clay excavation site—known locally as the "Clay Hole"—is one of the lasting reminders of Coon Rapids's industrial history. Today, the vital Red River Ox Cart Trail is known as Coon Rapids Boulevard and remains an important commercial corridor for the city.

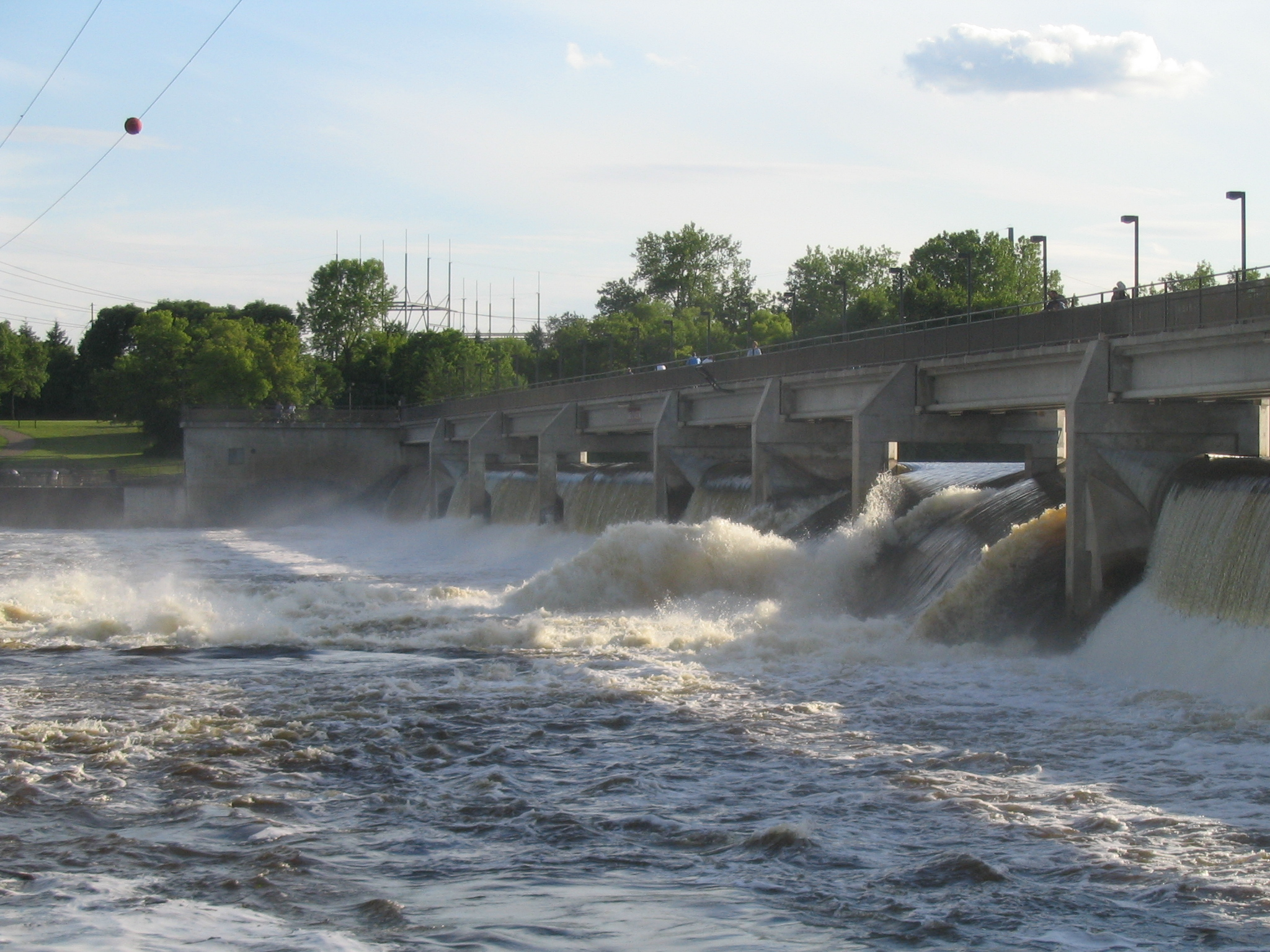
Coon Rapids Dam

In 1912, construction began on the Coon Rapids Dam and the influx of laborers and engineers increased the city's population to over 1,000 for the first time. Completed in 1914, the dam functioned as a regional power source for the Northern States Power Company until it was sold to the Hennepin County Park Board in 1969 and incorporated into the Coon Rapids Dam Regional Park.

When the dam was built, Anoka Township renamed itself Coon Creek Rapids, later shortened to Coon Rapids. In 1959, the Village of Coon Rapids voted to incorporate as a city and the City of Coon Rapids was born. The city's population increased from 14,000 in 1959 to more than 62,785 in 2022, making it the 15th-largest city in Minnesota.

In 1968, 1986, 2006, and 2021, attempts were made to change the name of the city, because the word "coon" is not only short for "raccoon" but is also used as a racial slur. Proposed names include Rapids, River Rapids, Creek Rapids, Hotdish Hollow, Pine Acres, Tornado Rapids, Skeeterville, and Raccoon Rapids.

== Transportation ==
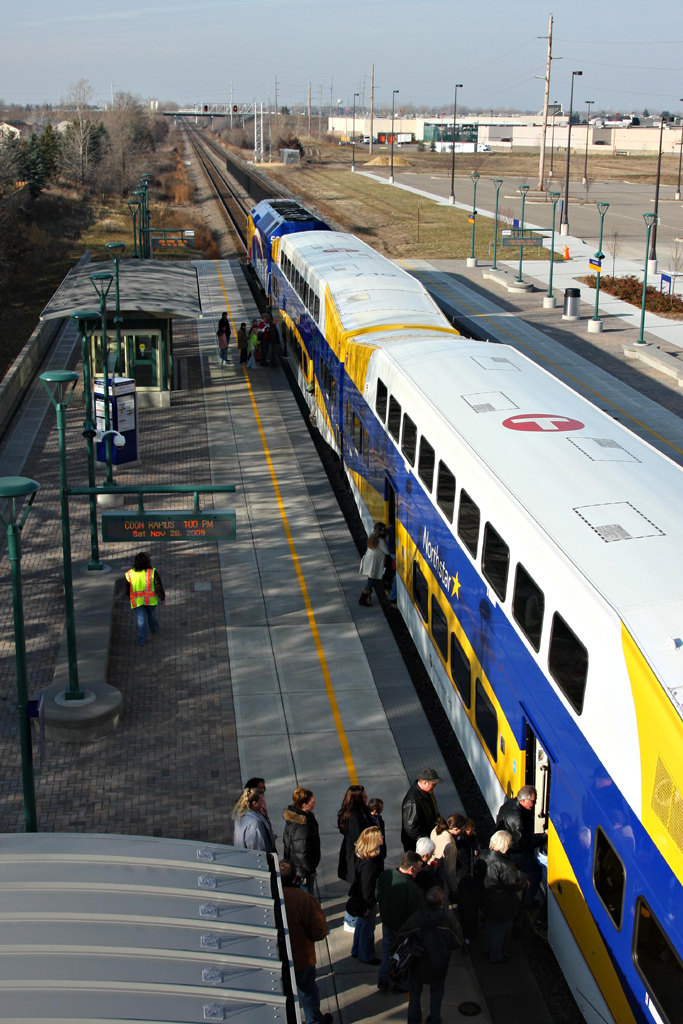
Coon Rapids–Riverdale station on the Northstar Line

While commercial traffic on the Mississippi River once passed through Coon Rapids—steamboats could reach as far north as St. Cloud under certain conditions—the completion of the Coon Rapids Dam in 1914 established the city as the Mississippi River's northernmost navigable point.

U.S. Highway 10, Minnesota State Highway 47, and Minnesota State Highway 610 are three of the main routes in the city.

Coon Rapids Riverdale Station was served by the Northstar Commuter Rail line connecting the northwest suburbs and downtown Minneapolis; the line opened in 2009 and closed in 2026. It was replaced by a bus service.

The BNSF mainline railroad from Seattle to Chicago travels directly through Coon Rapids, and the commuter rail runs on these tracks.

== Economy ==
Coon Rapids is home to the headquarters of medical device manufacturer RMS Company; healthcare and housing provider Mary T, Inc.; furniture retailer HOM Furniture; and printers/publishers John Roberts Company and ECM Publishers.

=== Largest employers ===
According to the City's 2014 Comprehensive Annual Financial Report, the city's largest employers are:

#	Employer	# of Employees
1	Mercy Health (Allina Health System)	1,860
2	Independent School District #11	1,238
3	Mary T, Inc.	1,120
4	RMS Company	672
5	Honeywell Aerospace	600
6	Anoka-Ramsey Community College	403
7	HOM Furniture	300
8	Target	300
9	City of Coon Rapids	285
10	Menards	220
11	Walmart	200

== Government ==
Coon Rapids is a charter city with a council-manager form of government. The city council has seven members: the mayor and a member at-large, both elected by the entire city, and one member for each of the city's five wards.

=== State level ===
As of the 2025 special election, Coon Rapids is represented in the Minnesota State House via the following districts:

- District 34B (Xp Lee, DFL)
- District 35A (Zack Stephenson, DFL)
- District 35B (Kari Rehrauer, DFL)

State Senate:

- District 34 (John Hoffman, DFL)
- District 35 (Jim Abeler, Republican)

=== Congress ===
Coon Rapids is in Minnesota's 3rd congressional district, represented by Democrat Kelly Morrison.

=== Mayors and local government ===
Since its incorporation as a city in 1952, Coon Rapids has had 15 mayors:

- Joe Nelson (1952–1953)
- Glenn Haven (1954–1955)
- Leslie B. Mason (1956–1958)
- Irving Nelson (1958–1959)
- Joe Craig (1960–1967)
- Robert Voss (1968–1971)
- Donald Erlandson (1972–1975)
- George White (1976–1979)
- David S. McCauley (1980–1981)
- Robert B. Lewis (1982–1989)
- Richard S. Reiter (1990–1991)
- William F. Thompson (1992–1998)
- Ilona McCauley (1999–2002)
- Tim Howe (2003–2014)
- Jerry Koch (2015–present)

The next mayoral election is in 2026.

As of 2025, the members of the Coon Rapids City Council are:

- Ward 1: Brad Greskowiak (Term Expires December 31, 2028)
- Ward 2: Peter Butler (Term Expires December 31, 2028)
- Ward 3: Sean Novack (Term Expires December 31, 2026)
- Ward 4: Christopher Geisler (Term Expires December 31, 2028)
- Ward 5: Brian Armstrong (Term Expires December 31, 2026)
- At-Large: Pat Carlson (Term Expires December 31, 2028)

Presidential election results 1960–2020

Precinct General Election Results
Year	Republican	Democratic	Third parties
2020	45.1% 16,154	52.2% 18,707	2.7% 980
2016	47.0% 15,427	43.4% 14,237	9.6% 3,137
2012	46.5% 16,064	51.0% 17,617	2.5% 852
2008	47.4% 16,317	50.5% 17,399	2.1% 736
2004	50.8% 17,365	48.0% 16,414	1.2% 391
2000	46.4% 13,262	48.4% 13,817	5.2% 1,500
1996	34.5% 9,195	53.0% 14,146	12.5% 3,347
1992	31.6% 9,105	41.7% 12,022	26.7% 7,724
1988	45.7% 10,111	54.3% 11,994	0.0% 0
1984	48.5% 9,326	51.5% 9,895	0.0% 0
1980	37.7% 5,761	52.2% 7,978	10.1% 1,548
1976	36.7% 5,134	61.1% 8,533	2.2% 306
1972	50.9% 5,351	46.0% 4,839	3.1% 322
1968	32.0% 2,795	61.8% 5,400	6.2% 537
1964	28.4% 2,205	71.5% 5,558	0.1% 12
1960	39.5% 2,314	60.3% 3,538	0.2% 12

== Education ==
The city is home to Anoka-Ramsey Community College, which offers a wide variety of 2- and 4-year programs. The college awarded 754 Associate degrees in 2013.

Coon Rapids is served by the Anoka-Hennepin Public School District 11.

=== High schools ===
Coon Rapids High School is the city's largest public school, with about 1,935 students in four grades, 9–12, as of 2025–26 projections.

Paladin Career & Technical High School, a charter school, has also been in Coon Rapids since 2022. As of 2023-24 it had 299 students in grades 9–12.

Northwest Passage High School is a charter school specializing in inquiry-driven project based learning, interdisciplinary seminars, and expeditions. Enrollment was 149 students across grades 9 to 12 as of the 2023–24 annual report.

=== Middle schools ===
Coon Rapids Middle School has a projected enrollment of 1,298 for 2025–26 for grades 6 to 8.

Northdale Middle School has a projected enrollment of 1,192 for 2025–26 for grades 6 to 8.

The Catholic Church of the Epiphany has a private school for grades Pre-K to 8.

Cross of Christ Lutheran School is a Pre-K–8 grade school of the Wisconsin Evangelical Lutheran Synod in Coon Rapids.

=== Elementary schools ===
Adams Elementary School has a projected enrollment of 456 students from K to 5.

Eisenhower Elementary School has a projected enrollment of 475 students from K to 5.

Hamilton Elementary School has a projected enrollment of 364 students from K to 5.

Hoover Elementary School has a projected enrollment of 459 students from K to 5.

Mississippi Elementary School has a projected enrollment of 436 students from K to 5.

Morris Bye Elementary School has a projected enrollment of 442 students from K to 5.

Sand Creek Elementary School has a projected enrollment of 559 students from K to 5.

=== Historical ===
In the 1980s the Minnesota Japanese School, a weekend supplementary school for Japanese people, held classes at the Coon Rapids campus, using 11 of its classrooms.

== Recreation ==
Coon Rapids contains several Anoka County parks, such as Coon Rapids Dam and Bunker Hills Regional Park, including Bunker Beach water park.

== Demographics ==
Historical population
Census	Pop.	Note	%±
1860	602		—
1870	1,498		148.8%
1880	261		−82.6%
1890	360		37.9%
1900	382		6.1%
1910	422		10.5%
1920	548		29.9%
1930	670		22.3%
1940	1,018		51.9%
1950	2,563		151.8%
1960	14,931		482.6%
1970	30,505		104.3%
1980	35,826		17.4%
1990	52,978		47.9%
2000	61,627		16.3%
2010	61,476		−0.2%
2020	63,599		3.5%
2021 (est.)	62,785		−1.3%
U.S. Decennial Census; 2020 Census

=== 2020 census ===
As of the 2020 census, Coon Rapids had a population of 63,599. The median age was 38.6 years. 23.0% of residents were under the age of 18 and 16.2% of residents were 65 years of age or older. For every 100 females there were 94.3 males, and for every 100 females age 18 and over there were 91.6 males age 18 and over.

100.0% of residents lived in urban areas, while 0.0% lived in rural areas.

There were 24,518 households in Coon Rapids, of which 30.4% had children under the age of 18 living in them. Of all households, 47.4% were married-couple households, 16.2% were households with a male householder and no spouse or partner present, and 27.9% were households with a female householder and no spouse or partner present. About 25.6% of all households were made up of individuals and 11.1% had someone living alone who was 65 years of age or older.

There were 25,144 housing units, of which 2.5% were vacant. The homeowner vacancy rate was 0.6% and the rental vacancy rate was 3.8%.

Racial composition as of the 2020 census
Race	Number	Percent
White	46,847	73.7%
Black or African American	6,597	10.4%
American Indian and Alaska Native	461	0.7%
Asian	3,888	6.1%
Native Hawaiian and Other Pacific Islander	21	0.0%
Some other race	1,374	2.2%
Two or more races	4,411	6.9%
Hispanic or Latino (of any race)	2,994	4.7%

=== 2010 census ===
As of the census of 2010, there were 61,476 people, 23,532 households, and 16,323 families living in the city. The population density was 2,719.0 inhabitants per square mile (1,049.8/km^{2}). There were 24,462 housing units at an average density of 1,081.9 per square mile (417.7/km^{2}). The racial makeup of the city was 86.0% White, 5.5% African American, 0.7% Native American, 3.5% Asian, 1.2% from other races, and 3.1% from two or more races. Hispanic or Latino of any race were 3.2% of the population.

There were 23,532 households, of which 34.3% had children under the age of 18 living with them, 51.4% were married couples living together, 13.0% had a female householder with no husband present, 4.9% had a male householder with no wife present, and 30.6% were non-families. 23.8% of all households were made up of individuals, and 7.8% had someone living alone who was 65 years of age or older. The average household size was 2.60 and the average family size was 3.08.

The median age in the city was 36.9 years. 24.5% of residents were under the age of 18; 8.9% were between the ages of 18 and 24; 27.5% were from 25 to 44; 27.8% were from 45 to 64; and 11.3% were 65 years of age or older. The gender makeup of the city was 48.4% male and 51.6% female.

=== 2000 census ===
As of the census of 2000, there were 61,627 people, 22,578 households, and 16,572 families living in the city. The population density was 2,718.1 inhabitants per square mile (1,049.5/km^{2}). There were 22,828 housing units at an average density of 1,007.2 per square mile (388.9/km^{2}). The racial makeup of the city was 93.22% White, 2.18% African American, 0.67% Native American, 1.60% Asian, 0.01% Pacific Islander, 0.59% from other races, and 1.73% from two or more races. Hispanic or Latino of any race were 1.51% of the population.

There were 22,578 households, out of which 39.1% had children under the age of 18 living with them, 57.3% were married couples living together, 12.2% had a female householder with no husband present, and 26.6% were non-families. 20.1% of all households were made up of individuals, and 5.1% had someone living alone who was 65 years of age or older. The average household size was 2.71 and the average family size was 3.15.

In the city, the population was spread out, with 28.7% under the age of 18, 8.9% from 18 to 24, 33.3% from 25 to 44, 21.7% from 45 to 64, and 7.3% who were 65 years of age or older. The median age was 33 years. For every 100 females, there were 94.8 males. For every 100 females age 18 and over, there were 91.5 males.

The median income for a household in the city was $55,550, and the median income for a family was $62,260. Males had a median income of $41,195 versus $30,277 for females. The per capita income for the city was $22,915. About 3.6% of families and 4.8% of the population were below the poverty line, including 6.6% of those under age 18 and 6.1% of those age 65 or over.

== Notable people ==
- Claire Butorac - forward for the Minnesota Frost of the Professional Women's Hockey League; former captain of Minnesota State Mavericks women's ice hockey; Walter Cup champion with Minnesota.
