= Minnesota State Mavericks women's ice hockey =

- Current season
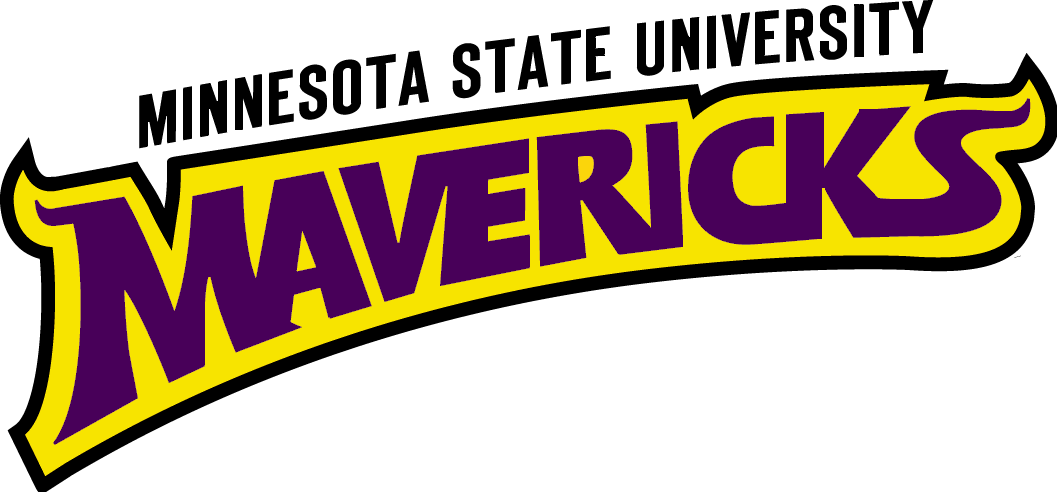
- University: Minnesota State University
- Conference: WCHA
- Head coach: Shari Dickerman; 1st season, 14–21–2
- Arena: Mayo Clinic Health System Event Center; Mankato, Minnesota
- Colors: Purple and gold

The Minnesota State Mavericks women's hockey ice program represents Minnesota State University, Mankato, and participate in the Western Collegiate Hockey Association.

== History ==
In October 2010, Kathleen Rogan registered a hat trick as the Mavericks defeated No. 6-ranked North Dakota by a 4–2 margin. This was the Mavericks first hat trick since Ashley Young registered one against Bemidji State in 2008.

In 2018 and 2019, the Mavericks played in the Women's Face-Off Classic game hosted by the U.S. Hockey Hall of Fame Museum. In 2018, they faced off against Bemidji State, at the Brainerd Essentia Health Sports Center. In 2019, they played against the Minnesota Golden Gophers, at the Dakotah! Ice Center at Prior Lake, Minnesota.

On February 8, 2020, the Mavericks beat the Wisconsin Badgers, ranked #1 in the nation at the time, by a score of 3–1, on home ice. Maverick goalie Calla Frank made 35 saves and had a shut-out through two periods. Minnesota State had not defeated Wisconsin since March 1, 2014.

After the 2023–24 season, head coach John Harrington stepped down and Shari Dickerman was named the new head coach.

=== Year by year ===
| Won championship | Lost championship | Conference champions | League leader |

| Year | Coach | W | L | T | Conference | Conf. W | Conf. L | Conf. T | Finish | Conference Tournament | NCAA Tournament |
| 2024–25 | Shari Dickerman | 14 | 21 | 2 | WCHA | 7 | 19 | 2 | 6th WCHA | Lost Quarterfinals vs. Minnesota (1–6, 5–4 OT, 2–6) | Did not qualify |
| 2023–24 | John Harrington | 13 | 25 | 0 | WCHA | 6 | 22 | 0 | 6th WCHA | Lost Quarterfinals vs. Minnesota (5–4, 1–7, 0–3) | Did not qualify |
| 2022–23 | John Harrington | 15 | 20 | 1 | WCHA | 9 | 18 | 1 | 6th WCHA | Lost Quarterfinals vs. Wisconsin (0–3, 1–4) | Did not qualify |
| 2021–22 | John Harrington | 15 | 19 | 1 | WCHA | 10 | 17 | 1 | 5th WCHA | Lost Quarterfinals vs. Minnesota-Duluth (4–5, 3–1, 2–3 OT) | Did not qualify |
| 2020–21 | John Harrington | 7 | 12 | 1 | WCHA | 7 | 12 | 1 | 5th WCHA | Did not qualify | Did not qualify |
| 2019–20 | John Harrington | 11 | 20 | 6 | WCHA | 4 | 16 | 4 | 6th WCHA | Lost Quarterfinals vs. Ohio State (2–4, 0–1) | Did not qualify |
| 2018–19 | John Harrington | 9 | 19 | 7 | WCHA | 3 | 16 | 5 | 6th WCHA | Lost Quarterfinals vs Ohio State (2–3 OT, 0–3) | Did not qualify |
| 2017–18 | John Harrington | 5 | 28 | 1 | WCHA | 3 | 21 | 0 | 7th WCHA | Lost Quarterfinals vs Ohio State (0–6, 2–5) | Did not qualify |
| 2016–17 | John Harrington | 7 | 26 | 4 | WCHA | 4 | 21 | 3 | 8th WCHA | Lost Quarterfinals vs Wisconsin (0–7, 0–6) | Did not qualify |
| 2015–16 | John Harrington | 3 | 29 | 4 | WCHA | 0 | 25 | 3 | 8th WCHA | Lost Quarterfinals vs. Wisconsin (0–4, 0–6) | Did not qualify |
| 2014–15 | Eric Means | 3 | 32 | 1 | WCHA | 1 | 26 | 1 | 8th WCHA | Lost Quarterfinals vs. Minnesota (0–10, 1–5) | Did not qualify |
| 2013–14 | Eric Means | 13 | 23 | 1 | WCHA | 7 | 20 | 1 | 7th WCHA | Lost Quarterfinals vs. Wisconsin (0–4, 3–0, 0–2) | Did not qualify |
| 2012–13 | Eric Means | 10 | 21 | 5 | WCHA | 6 | 17 | 5 | 6th WCHA | Lost Quarterfinals vs. North Dakota (1–6, 1–8) | Did not qualify |
| 2011–12 | Eric Means | 7 | 28 | 1 | WCHA | 3 | 24 | 1 | 8th WCHA | Lost Quarterfinals vs. Wisconsin (0–7, 0–4) | Did not qualify |
| 2010–11 | Eric Means | 8 | 25 | 3 | WCHA | 7 | 20 | 1 | 7th WCHA | Lost Quarterfinals vs. Minnesota-Duluth (0–3, 0–5) | Did not qualify |
| 2009–10 | Eric Means | 7 | 22 | 5 | WCHA | 5 | 18 | 5 | 7th WCHA | Lost Quarterfinals vs. Minnesota (5–8, 3–4 3OT) | Did not qualify |
| 2008–09 | Jeff Vizenor | 12 | 19 | 5 | WCHA | 7 | 16 | 5 | 5th WCHA | Won Quarterfinals vs. St. Cloud State (1–2, 2–1, 1–0); Lost Semifinals vs. Minnesota (2–7) | Did not qualify |
| 2007–08 | Jeff Vizenor | 11 | 21 | 2 | WCHA | 10 | 16 | 2 | 6th WCHA | Lost Quarterfinals vs. Wisconsin (2–4, 0–5) | Did not qualify |
| 2006–07 | Jeff Vizenor | 16 | 17 | 2 | WCHA | 12 | 14 | 2 | 5th WCHA | Lost Quarterfinals vs. Ohio State (0–9, 4–5 OT) | Did not qualify |
| 2005–06 | Jeff Vizenor | 11 | 21 | 4 | WCHA | 8 | 17 | 3 | 7th WCHA | Lost Quarterfinals vs. Minnesota (1–5, 0–6) | Did not qualify |
| 2004–05 | Jeff Vizenor | 9 | 20 | 6 | WCHA | 8 | 17 | 3 | 5th WCHA | Lost Quarterfinals vs. Ohio State (1–4) | Did not qualify |
| 2003–04 | Jeff Vizenor | 16 | 14 | 4 | WCHA | 9 | 11 | 4 | 4th WCHA | Lost Quarterfinals vs. Ohio State (1–3) | Did not qualify |
| 2002–03 | Jeff Vizenor | 10 | 21 | 3 | WCHA | 3 | 18 | 3 | 7th WCHA | Did not qualify | Did not qualify |
| 2001–02 | Jeff Vizenor | 4 | 26 | 2 | WCHA | 1 | 22 | 3 | 7th WCHA | Did not qualify | Did not qualify |
| 2000–01 | Todd Carroll | 2 | 31 | 2 | WCHA | 0 | 23 | 1 | 7th WCHA | Lost Quarterfinals vs. Minnesota-Duluth (1–10) | Did not qualify |
| 1999-00 | Todd Carroll | 8 | 25 | 2 | WCHA | 3 | 19 | 2 | 7th WCHA | Lost Quarterfinals vs. Minnesota (0–10) | Did not qualify |
| 1998–99 | Todd Carroll | 11 | 14 | 0 | WCHA | | | | | | |

== Current roster ==
As of August 21, 2022.

| No. | Nat. | Player | Class | Pos | Height | DoB | Hometown | Previous team |
|---|---|---|---|---|---|---|---|---|
| 1 | | Alexa Berg | Senior | G | 5' 6" (1.68 m) | 2000-03-27 | White Bear Lake, Minnesota | Norwich University |
| 2 | | Oceane Asham | Freshman | F | 5' 7" (1.7 m) | 2004-06-22 | Portage la Prairie, Manitoba | Balmoral Hall School |
| 3 | | Sydney Langseth | Junior | F | 5' 9" (1.75 m) | 2002-01-29 | Eden Prairie, Minnesota | Eden Prairie High School |
| 4 | | Taylor Wemple | Senior | D | 6' 0" (1.83 m) | 1998-12-14 | Maplewood, Minnesota | St. Cloud State University |
| 5 | | Anna Wilgren (C) | Senior | D | 5' 8" (1.73 m) | 1999-11-11 | Hudson, Wisconsin | Hudson High School |
| 6 | | Lilie Ramirez | Freshman | D | 5' 5" (1.65 m) | 2004-08-03 | South St. Paul, Minnesota | South St. Paul Secondary |
| 7 | | Claire Butorac (C) | Senior | F | 5' 5" (1.65 m) | 1999-09-24 | Andover, Minnesota | Andover High School |
| 8 | | Charlotte Akervik (A) | Junior | D | 5' 10" (1.78 m) | 2001-02-17 | Eau Claire, Wisconsin | Eau Claire Area Stars |
| 9 | | Whitney Tuttle | Freshman | F | 5' 5" (1.65 m) | 2004-02-20 | Rosemount, Minnesota | Rosemount High School |
| 10 | | Jamie Nelson | Junior | F | 5' 8" (1.73 m) | 2002-06-13 | Andover, Minnesota | Andover High School |
| 11 | | Shelbi Guttormson | Sophomore | F | 5' 9" (1.75 m) | 2003-02-20 | Moorhead, Minnesota | Shattuck-Saint Mary's |
| 12 | | Kennedy Bobyck | Senior | F | 5' 1" (1.55 m) | 2001-02-14 | Regina, Saskatchewan | Edge School |
| 14 | | Alexis Paddington | Sophomore | F | 5' 9" (1.75 m) | 2003-04-03 | Thunder Bay, Ontario | Thunder Bay Queens |
| 15 | | Kianna Roeske | Freshman | D | 5' 5" (1.65 m) | 2004-05-20 | Paynesville, Minnesota | River Lakes Stars |
| 16 | | Sydney Shearen | Senior | F | 5' 4" (1.63 m) | 2001-08-02 | Hugo, Minnesota | University of Minnesota |
| 17 | | Brooke Bryant | Senior | F | 5' 6" (1.68 m) | 2000-08-22 | Linden, California | Anaheim Lady Ducks |
| 18 | | Jayden Seifert | Sophomore | D | 5' 8" (1.73 m) | 2003-04-02 | Farmington, Minnesota | Farmington High School |
| 20 | | Kelsey King | Senior | F | 5' 8" (1.73 m) | 2000-10-29 | Elk River, Minnesota | Elk River High School |
| 21 | | Jessica Boland | Sophomore | F | 5' 3" (1.6 m) | 2003-01-20 | Northfield, Minnesota | Northfield High School |
| 22 | | Madison Mashuga | Junior | F | 5' 5" (1.65 m) | 2001-12-18 | Andover, Minnesota | Anoka High School |
| 23 | | Lyndsey Howard | Senior | D | 5' 7" (1.7 m) | 2001-02-23 | Savage, Minnesota | Burnsville High School |
| 24 | | Taylor Otremba | Freshman | F | 5' 5" (1.65 m) | 2003-12-23 | Lakeville, Minnesota | Lakeville South High School |
| 37 | | Lauren Barbro | Junior | G | 5' 6" (1.68 m) | 2002-05-22 | Loudonville, New York | Shattuck-Saint Mary's |
| 43 | | Danielle England | Senior | F | 5' 4" (1.63 m) | 2001-08-16 | South Lyon, Michigan | HoneyBaked |
| 55 | | Emerald Kelley | Junior | G | 5' 8" (1.73 m) | 2002-04-15 | Hastings, Minnesota | East Ridge High School |
| 77 | | Calla Frank | Senior | G | 5' 6" (1.68 m) | 2000-12-11 | Hugo, Minnesota | White Bear Lake Area High School |

== Awards and honors ==
- Alli Altmann, WCHA Defensive Player of the Week (Week of February 17, 2010)
- Alli Altmann, WCHA Defensive Player of the Week (Week of December 14, 2011)
- Katie Beaudy, WCHA Student-Athlete of the Year (1999-00)
- Corbin Boyd, WCHA Student-Athlete of the Year (2018–2019)
- Danielle Butters, All-WCHA Third Team (2013–2014)
- Megan Hinze, WCHA Defensive Player of the Month (December 2016)
- Kelsey King, WCHA Rookie of the Month (October 2019)
- Kelsey King, WCHA Rookie of the Month (November 2019)
- Emmi Leinonen, WCHA Offensive Player of the Week (Week of October 21, 2009)
- Abigail Levy, All-WCHA Second Team (2018–2019)
- Jamie Nelson, 2020–21 WCHA Rookie of the Year
- Kathleen Rogan, WCHA Rookie of the Week (Week of October 27, 2010)
- Kathleen Rogan, WCHA Rookie of the Week (Week of November 17, 2010)
- Nina Tikkinen, WCHA Player of the Week, (Week of November 10, 2010)
- Nina Tikkinen, WCHA Player of the Week, (Week of November 17, 2010)
- McKenzie Sederberg, WCHA Defenseman of the Week (Week of February 14, 2020)
- Lauren Smith, All-WCHA Third Team (2012–2013)
- Shari Vogt, All-American Second Team (2003–2004)
- Shari Vogt, All-WCHA Team (2002–2003)
- Shari Vogt, All-WCHA Team (2003–2004)
- Anna Wilgren, WCHA Defenseman of the Week (Week of October 25)
- Anna Wilgren, WCHA Defenseman of the Month (November 2019)
- Ashley Young, 2010 Frozen Four Skills Competition participant

== International ==
- Alli Altmann was the goaltending coach for the US National Women's Ice Hockey U-18 team, in 2018, 2019, and 2020. She also was goaltending coach in 2017 for the US Women's U-18 Select team in the US-Canada series.
- Nina Tikkinen played for Finland’s 2010 Winter Olympic Hockey Team.

== Mavericks in professional hockey ==
| = CWHL All-Star | = NWHL All-Star | = Clarkson Cup Champion | = Isobel Cup Champion |

| Player | Position | Team(s) | League(s) | Years | Clarkson Cup | Isobel Cup |
|---|---|---|---|---|---|---|
| Alli Altmann | Goaltender | Minnesota Whitecaps | Ind. before NWHL affiliation | | | |
| Danielle Butters | Goaltender | Toronto Furies | CWHL | 1 | | |

== See also ==
- Minnesota State Mavericks men's ice hockey
- WCHA women's ice hockey
