= Wyatt Kaiser =

American ice hockey player (born 2002)

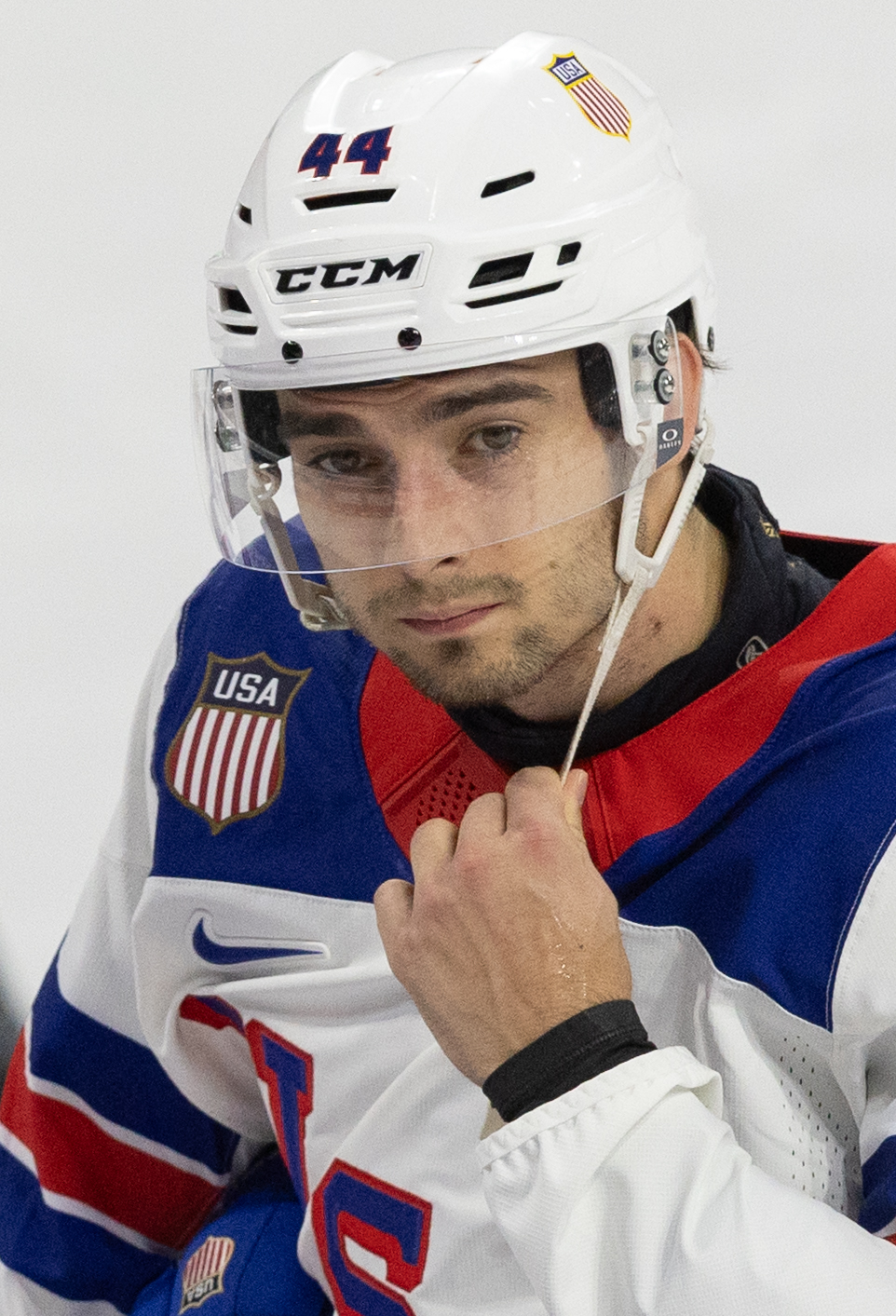
- Kaiser in 2026
- Born: July 31, 2002 (age 23) Andover, Minnesota, U.S.
- Height: 6 ft 0 in (183 cm)
- Weight: 190 lb (86 kg; 13 st 8 lb)
- Position: Defense
- Shoots: Left
- NHL team: Chicago Blackhawks
- National team: United States
- NHL draft: 81st overall, 2020; Chicago Blackhawks
- Playing career: 2023–present

Wyatt Kaiser (born July 31, 2002) is an American professional ice hockey player who is a defenseman for the Chicago Blackhawks of the National Hockey League (NHL). Kaiser was drafted 81st overall by the Blackhawks in the 2020 NHL entry draft.

== Playing career ==
Kaiser, as a Minnesota native, played high school hockey with Andover Huskies in the Minnesota State High School League (USHS). In his final high school year, he joined the Dubuque Fighting Saints of the United States Hockey League (USHL) for parts of the 2019–20 season, having committed to a collegiate career with Minnesota Duluth in the National Collegiate Hockey Conference.

Before joining the Bulldogs as a freshman in the 2020–21 season, Kaiser was selected in the 2020 NHL entry draft, in the third-round, 81st overall, by the Chicago Blackhawks.

In his first season with Minnesota-Duluth, Kaiser was leading the blueline in scoring with 10 assists through 28 games before the season was halted due to the COVID-19 pandemic. As a result, Kaiser was selected to the NCHC All-Rookie Team.

Following his junior season with the Bulldogs in 2022–23, Kaiser opted to conclude his collegiate career by signing a three-year, entry-level contract with the Chicago Blackhawks on March 15, 2023. Reporting directly to the rebuilding Blackhawks roster, Kaiser made his professional and NHL debut in a 4–2 defeat to the Arizona Coyotes on March 18, 2023. He registered his first NHL point, an assist on a goal to Tyler Johnson, in a 4–1 defeat to the Dallas Stars on March 28, 2023. He completed the 2022–23 season, posting 3 assists through 9 regular season games with Chicago.

On September 17, 2025, Kaiser signed a two-year $3.4 million contract to remain with the Blackhawks.

== International play ==
Kaiser represented the United States at the 2022 World Junior Ice Hockey Championships, where he recorded an assist in the opening round-robin game before the tournament was cancelled due to the ongoing COVID-19 pandemic. He later returned for the revised tournament and posted 2 goals and 3 points as Team USA finished out of medal contention in 5th place.

== Personal life ==
Kaiser's younger sister, Madison, plays collegiate hockey at the University of Minnesota. Kaiser’s grandfather, Blane Comstock, was a member of the 1976 Olympic hockey team as a goaltender. Comstock was an All-American at what is now Bemidji State University.

== Career statistics ==
=== Regular season and playoffs ===
			Regular season					Playoffs
Season	Team	League	GP	G	A	Pts	PIM	GP	G	A	Pts	PIM
2017–18	Andover High School	USHS	22	3	10	13	14	3	1	2	3	0
2018–19	Andover High School	USHS	25	9	20	29	28	3	1	2	3	0
2019–20	Andover High School	USHS	25	9	25	34	26	6	2	7	9	8
2019–20	Dubuque Fighting Saints	USHL	11	0	3	3	6	—	—	—	—	—
2020–21	U. of Minnesota-Duluth	NCHC	28	0	10	10	26	—	—	—	—	—
2021–22	U. of Minnesota-Duluth	NCHC	34	2	17	19	46	—	—	—	—	—
2022–23	U. of Minnesota-Duluth	NCHC	35	5	18	23	48	—	—	—	—	—
2022–23	Chicago Blackhawks	NHL	9	0	3	3	4	—	—	—	—	—
2023–24	Chicago Blackhawks	NHL	32	0	7	7	22	—	—	—	—	—
2023–24	Rockford IceHogs	AHL	37	4	14	18	46	4	0	2	2	0
2024–25	Chicago Blackhawks	NHL	57	4	4	8	14	—	—	—	—	—
2024–25	Rockford IceHogs	AHL	17	0	3	3	7	—	—	—	—	—
2025–26	Chicago Blackhawks	NHL	77	6	11	17	34	—	—	—	—	—
NHL totals			175	10	25	35	74	—	—	—	—	—

=== International ===
Year	Team	Event	Result	GP	G	A	Pts	PIM
2019	United States	HG18	6th	4	0	0	0	2
2022	United States	WJC	5th	5	2	1	3	2
2026	United States	WC	8th	3	0	0	0	0
Junior totals				9	2	1	3	4
Senior totals				3	0	0	0	0

== Awards and honors ==
Award	Year
College
NCHC All-Rookie Team	2021
NCHC Honorable Mention All-Star Team	2021
All-NCHC Second Team	2023
