= Anoka-Hennepin School District 11 =

School district in Minnesota, United States

Anoka-Hennepin School District

Location
- North Metropolitan Twin Cities United States

District information
- Type: Public
- Motto: A Future Without Limit
- Grades: PreK–12
- Established: 1920
- Superintendent: Greg Cole
- Schools: 34

Students and staff
- Students: ▲37,411 (2026-2027)

Other information
- Website: ahschools.us

The Anoka-Hennepin School District 11 is a school district in Minnesota, northwest of Minneapolis and Saint Paul. The district serves 13 communities: All of Anoka, Champlin and Coon Rapids, and parts of Andover, Blaine, Brooklyn Center, Brooklyn Park, Dayton, Fridley, Ham Lake, Nowthen, Oak Grove and Ramsey. The district's name refers to its geographic span over two counties: it covers the southern portion of Anoka County and the northeast part of Hennepin County. The district was formed in 1920 and in 1952 after dozens of small rural school districts voted to consolidate.

As of the 2026-2027 school year, it is the largest school district in the state of Minnesota with an enrollment of 37,411. Students in grades K–12. Additional students attend pre-k programs as well as adults who are earning a diploma or GED through the district's Adult Basic Education program.

== School Board ==
Anoka-Hennepin is governed by a board whose members are elected to four-year terms.

On July 1, 2026, Greg Cole assumed office as the superintendent.

== Controversy ==
Between 2009 and 2011, nine students in Anoka-Hennepin died by suicide; the area was designated by state health officials as a "suicide contagion area." Many of these students were gay or perceived by their classmates to be gay, leading to bullying. The district is the subject of a federal investigation by the U.S. Department of Justice and the Office for Civil Rights in the U.S. Department of Education over the climate of anti-gay harassment and discrimination based on sex, including peer-on-peer harassment based on not conforming to gender stereotypes.

The district received criticism for its Sexual Orientation Curriculum Policy (Feb. 2009) because it stated that teachers should be neutral when addressing issues of sexual orientation in their classrooms. Critics said this "neutrality policy" prevented acceptance and open discussion of LGBT people and issues in schools, and was essentially a "gag order" on teachers. District administration attempted to clarify the policy by explaining its anti-bullying and harassment policies specifically name sexual orientation as a protected class of people. The Sexual Orientation Curriculum Policy stated teachers can address issues of sexual orientation in their classes provided the discussion is age-appropriate, fact-based and connected to the curriculum. In July 2011, the Southern Poverty Law Center and the National Center for Lesbian Rights filed a lawsuit against the district because of this policy. The lawsuit was filed on behalf of five current and former students who say that they were discriminated against because of their real or perceived sexual orientation and that teachers and district officials facilitated said violence and discrimination; a sixth student was added to the lawsuit a month later.

On February 13, 2012, the policy was repealed and replaced by a vote of 5–1 with a new Respectful Learning Environment Policy. The former policy required district staff to "remain neutral on matters regarding sexual orientation," while discussing such topics "in a respectful manner that is age-appropriate, factual, and pertinent to the relevant curriculum." By comparison, the new policy states, "It is not the District's role to take positions on these issues. Teachers and educational support staff shall not attempt in the course of their professional duties to persuade students to adopt or reject any particular viewpoint with respect to these issues." It states that such discussions, "shall be appropriate to the maturity and developmental level of students; be of significance to course content; and be presented in an impartial, balanced and objective manner, allowing respectful exchange of varying points of view." Finally, the new policy states that, "In the course of discussions of such issues, district staff shall affirm the dignity and self-worth of all students, regardless of their race, color, creed, religion, national origin, sex/gender, marital status, disability, status with regard to public assistance, sexual orientation, age, family care leave status or veteran status."

== Schools and facilities ==
=== Elementary schools ===
- Adams Elementary School
- Andover Elementary School
- Brookside Elementary School
- Champlin-Brooklyn Park Academy for Math and Environmental Science
- Crooked Lake Elementary School
- Dayton Elementary School
- Eisenhower Elementary School
- Evergreen Park Elementary STEM School of Innovation
- Franklin Elementary School
- Hamilton Elementary School
- Hoover Elementary School
- Jefferson Elementary School
- Johnsville Elementary School
- Lincoln Elementary School for the Arts
- L.O. Jacob Elementary School
- Madison Elementary School
- McKinley Elementary School
- Mississippi Elementary School
- Monroe Elementary School
- Morris Bye Elementary School
- Oxbow Creek Elementary School
- Ramsey Elementary School
- Rum River Elementary School
- Sand Creek Elementary School
- Sunrise Elementary School
- University Avenue Elementary School
- Wilson Elementary School

=== Middle schools ===
- Anoka Middle School for the Arts (Fred Moore and Washington campuses)
- Coon Rapids Middle School
- Jackson Middle School
- Northdale Middle School
- Oak View Middle School
- Roosevelt Middle School

=== Senior high schools ===
- Andover High School
- Anoka High School
- Blaine High School (includes the Center for Engineering, Mathematics and Science)
- Champlin Park High School
- Coon Rapids High School

The district runs five specialized programs for high school students:

- Crossroads Alternative High School
- Secondary Technical Education Program (STEP)
- Compass Alternative School (1st–12th grade)
- Project Lead The Way
- College in the Schools (CIS)

=== Other sites ===
- Bell Center
- Bridges Program
- Early Childhood at the Family Center Mall
- Educational Service Center (district office)
- Family Welcome Center
- Learning Center and Distribution Complex (houses Community Education Department, Early Childhood Special Education and Special Education departments)
- Sandburg Education Center
- Transition Plus

=== Non-District schools ===
These public charter, private, or parochial schools are located within the Anoka-Hennepin School District but are not affiliated.

- Cross of Christ
- DaVinci Academy of Arts and Science
- Epiphany Catholic School
- Legacy Christian Academy
- Modern Montessori Charter School
- Northwest Passage High School
- Saint Stephens Catholic School
- PACT Charter School (public)

== See also ==
- List of school districts in Minnesota
