= Nolan West =

American politician (born 1990)

Member of the Minnesota House of Representatives from the 32A district 37B (2017-2022)
- Incumbent
- Assumed office January 3, 2017
- Preceded by: Tim Sanders

Personal details
- Born: September 30, 1990 (age 36)
- Party: Republican
- Education: University of Minnesota

Nolan West (born September 30, 1990) is an American politician serving in the Minnesota House of Representatives since 2017. A member of the Republican Party of Minnesota, West represents District 32A in the northern Twin Cities metropolitan area, which includes the city of Blaine, Ham Lake, and parts of Anoka County.

== Early life, education, and career ==
West was raised in Blaine, Minnesota. He attended Meadow Creek Christian School in Andover (the year after he graduated, the school’s name was changed to Legacy Christian Academy). He graduated from the University of Minnesota with a Bachelor of Arts in history and a minor in political science. He was a legislative assistant for the Republican caucus in the Minnesota House of Representatives for almost two years until he resigned in September 2016 after reports of several racist posts he had made on Facebook.

== Minnesota House of Representatives ==
West was elected to the Minnesota House of Representatives in 2016, after incumbent Tim Sanders retired, and has been reelected every two years since. He serves as an assistant minority leader and sits on the Capital Investment, Education Finance, and Transportation Finance and Policy Committees.

West's first session was the 90th legislative session (2017–18), in which he was chief author of 30 bills, most notably HF0187, HF0297, and HF1496, all of which addressed one of the main infrastructure issues of his district, Highway 65. No bill that West chief authored made it through committee; all were dead/failed.

Unlike most other members of the Republican caucus, West has been a strong supporter of legalizing recreational cannabis in Minnesota. During the 92nd Minnesota Legislature, he voted for HF600, a bill that would have legalized cannabis in the state, though it was not taken up by the Republican-controlled Senate. During the 93rd Legislature, West was one of five House Republicans who voted for HF100, which similarly legalized cannabis in the state; the bill was also passed by the DFL-controlled Senate and signed into law by Governor Tim Walz. West gave a 15-minute speech in support of the bill, comparing cannabis to other legal recreational drugs, such as nicotine and alcohol.

== Electoral history ==
2016 Minnesota State House - District 37B
Party	Candidate	Votes	%
Republican	Nolan West	11,473	50.26
Democratic (DFL)	Susan Witt	11,305	49.52
Write-in		49	0.21
Total votes		22,827	100.0
Republican hold			

2018 Minnesota State House - District 37B
Party	Candidate	Votes	%
Republican	Nolan West (incumbent)	10,254	50.22
Democratic (DFL)	Amir Joseph Malik	10,101	49.47
Write-in		65	0.32
Total votes		20,420	100.0
Republican hold			

2020 Minnesota State House - District 37B
Party	Candidate	Votes	%
Republican	Nolan West (incumbent)	14,328	52.40
Democratic (DFL)	Amir Joseph Malik	12,984	47.48
Write-in		33	0.12
Total votes		27,345	100.0
Republican hold			

2022 Minnesota State House - District 32A
Party	Candidate	Votes	%
Republican	Nolan West (incumbent)	11,067	57.25
Democratic (DFL)	Ashton Ramsammy	8,247	42.66
Write-in		16	0.08
Total votes		19,330	100.0
Republican hold			

== Personal life ==
West resides in Blaine, Minnesota.
