= John Heinrich =

John Heinrich may refer to:

- Jack Heinrich, member of the British Columbia Legislative Assembly
- John Heinrich (politician), member of the Minnesota House of Representatives
