= Blaine, Minnesota =

City in the United States

- City
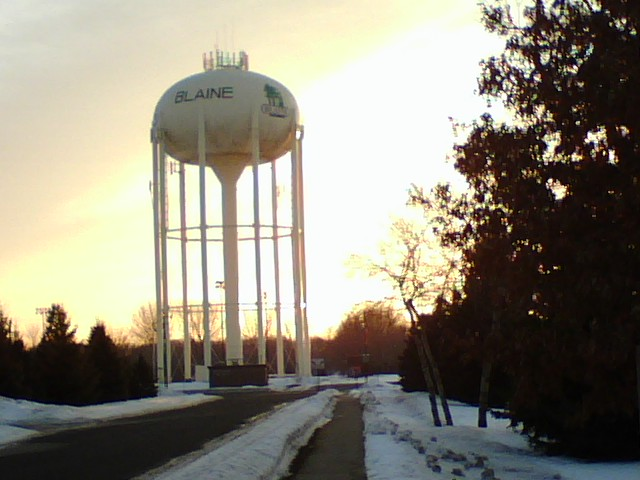
- Sunset in Blaine in January 2008

- Flag Logo
- Interactive map of Blaine, Minnesota
- Coordinates: 45°09′39″N 93°14′05″W
- Country: United States
- State: Minnesota
- Counties: Anoka, Ramsey
- Founded: 1877
- Incorporated: January 29, 1954
- Named for: James G. Blaine

Government
  - Type: Mayor–council government
  - Mayor: Tim Sanders (R)

Area
  - City: 34.03 sq mi (88.14 km^{2})
  - Land: 32.90 sq mi (85.22 km^{2})
  - Water: 1.12 sq mi (2.91 km^{2})
  - Urban: 0.6 sq mi (1.6 km^{2})
- Elevation: 906 ft (276 m)

Population (2020)
  - City: 70,222
  - Estimate (2025): 76,603
  - Rank: US: 519th MN: 10th
  - Density: 2,134.1/sq mi (823.98/km^{2})
  - Metro: 3,693,729 (16th)
- Demonym: Blainer
- Time zone: UTC-6 (Central (CST))
  - Summer (DST): UTC-5 (CDT)
- ZIP codes: 55014, 55434, 55449
- Area code: 763
- FIPS code: 27-06382
- GNIS feature ID: 2394183
- Website: blainemn.gov

Blaine (/ˈbleɪn/ BLAYN) is a suburban city in Anoka and Ramsey Counties in Minnesota, United States. It was once a rural town, but Blaine's population began to grow significantly in the 1950s. For several years, Blaine led the Twin Cities metro region in new home construction. The population was 70,222 at the 2020 census. The city is mainly in Anoka County, and is part of the Minneapolis–Saint Paul metropolitan area.

Interstate 35W, U.S. Highway 10, and Minnesota State Highway 65 are three of the main routes in the city.

== History ==
Phillip Leddy, a native of Ireland, was recorded in the 1857 census as having settled in the township of Anoka. He died in 1872 on land that later became Blaine. In 1862, he moved near a lake that now bears his misspelled name, Laddie Lake. Another early settler was the Englishman George Townsend, who lived for a short time near what today is Lever St. and 103rd Ave.

In 1865, Blaine's first permanent resident, Greenberry Chambers, settled on the old Townsend claim. Chambers was a former slave who moved north from Barren County, Kentucky, after the American Civil War. Around 1884, Chambers and his family moved to St. Paul.

In 1870, George Wall, Joseph Gagner, and others settled in the area and it began to grow.

In 1877, Blaine separated from Anoka and organized as a township. That year the first election was held and Moses Ripley was elected the first chairman of the Board of Supervisors. Ripley, who had come to Minnesota from Maine, persuaded his fellow board members to name the new township in honor of James G. Blaine, a U.S. Senator, statesman, and three-time presidential candidate from Maine. By 1880, Blaine's population had reached 128.

While many other Anoka County communities experienced growth due to farming, Blaine's sandy soil and abundant wetlands discouraged farmers, and it remained a prime hunting area. Blaine's growth remained slow until after World War II, when housing developments began in the southern part of town and the community became more suburban. Blaine's population grew from 1,694 in 1950 to 20,573 in 1970, 57,186 in 2010, and 70,222 in 2020. By 2023, the population was over 72,500.

The land development technique of sand mining opened thousands of acres of peat sod farms up for development. Beginning with the development of the Knoll Creek, Club West, Pleasure Creek, and TPC Twin Cities, existing land was modified through extensive grading efforts in large open-water areas. The sand from the excavation of those ponds was used to raise the level of a site. Such modifications are needed to accommodate the development of the homes and neighborhoods. The success of mining sand made further development possible. The centerpiece of those developments is the Lakes of Blaine. Corporate residents include the Aveda Corporation, Infinite Campus, PTC Inc, MagnetStreet, the parking lot portion of a Medtronic Development, and Dayton Rogers Manufacturing.

== Geography ==
According to the United States Census Bureau, the city has an area of 34.05 square miles (88.19 km^{2}), of which 33.85 square miles (87.67 km^{2}) is land and 0.20 square miles (0.52 km^{2}) is water. Blaine is 13 miles (21 kilometers) from Minneapolis and 20 mi (32 km) from St. Paul.

Blaine can be accessed from several major roadways in the Twin Cities, including Minnesota State Highway 65, Interstate 35W, University Avenue, Lexington Avenue, Hamline Avenue, U.S. Highway 10 and Minnesota State Highway 610.

=== Major landforms ===
The Blaine area was covered by a large glacier that shaped the landscape during the late Wisconsinan glaciation. The land used to be covered by river valleys 200 feet deep. The valleys filled with sediment. One valley ran northeast to southwest under Lino Lakes. As the glaciers retreated, the water gathered into a lake that covered much of Anoka County. Huge ice chunks were left in the glacier's wake. They melted and formed depressions that filled with water. This became the chain of lakes between Lino Lakes and Circle Pines.

Four major named water bodies are partially or completely within the city limits. Sunrise Lake, part of The Lakes housing development, is the largest body at 158 acres and a depth near 40 feet. The next-largest is Laddie Lake, Blaine's only naturally occurring lake, which is also partially in Spring Lake Park, at 77 acres, with a maximum depth of six feet. The third-largest is Club West Lake, at 39 acres and depths up to 25 feet, also man-made, in the Club West Housing development. Loch Ness is 11 acres, is managed by the city, and has a fishing dock. Several other large bodies of water in Blaine are not classified as lakes.

Blaine is creating a 500-acre open space plan. It started acquiring portions of the property in the late 1990s, but most of it was acquired after Blaine voters approved a $3.5 million referendum in 2000. A tentative long-range plan calls for the construction of a nature center by 2020. The 70-acre Kane Meadows Park next to The Lakes development has been the centerpiece of this program.

== Demographics ==
Historical population
Census	Pop.	Note	%±
1880	128		—
1890	205		60.2%
1900	374		82.4%
1910	413		10.4%
1920	550		33.2%
1930	506		−8.0%
1940	921		82.0%
1950	3,604		291.3%
1960	7,570		110.0%
1970	20,573		171.8%
1980	28,558		38.8%
1990	38,975		36.5%
2000	44,942		15.3%
2010	57,186		27.2%
2020	70,222		22.8%
2025 (est.)	76,603		9.1%
U.S. Decennial Census; 2020 Census

=== 2020 census ===
As of the 2020 census, Blaine had a population of 70,222. The median age was 37.5. 26.6% of residents were under 18 and 13.3% were 65 or older. For every 100 females there were 95.3 males, and for every 100 females 18 or older there were 93.2 males 18 or older.

99.5% of residents lived in urban areas and 0.5% in rural areas.

Blaine had 25,172 households, of which 37.5% had children under 18 living in them. 56.0% were married-couple households, 13.8% were households with a male householder and no spouse or partner present, and 22.8% were households with a female householder and no spouse or partner present. About 21.3% of all households were made up of individuals and 8.8% had someone living alone who was 65 or older.

There were 25,830 housing units, of which 2.5% were vacant. The homeowner vacancy rate was 0.7% and the rental vacancy rate was 5.7%.

Racial composition as of the 2020 census
Race	Number	Percent
White	51,958	74.0%
Black or African American	5,013	7.1%
American Indian and Alaska Native	403	0.6%
Asian	6,314	9.0%
Native Hawaiian and Other Pacific Islander	21	0.0%
Some other race	1,799	2.6%
Two or more races	4,714	6.7%
Hispanic or Latino (of any race)	3,946	5.6%

=== 2010 census ===
As of the census of 2010, there were 57,186 people, 21,077 households, and 15,423 families living in the city. The population density was 1,689.4 inhabitants per square mile (652.3/km^{2}). There were 21,921 housing units at an average density of 647.6 per square mile (250.0/km^{2}). The racial makeup of the city was 84.0% White, 3.7% African American, 0.5% Native American, 7.8% Asian, 1.2% from other races, and 2.7% from two or more races. Hispanic or Latino people of any race were 3.2% of the population.

There were 21,077 households, of which 38.3% had children under the age of 18 living with them, 57.8% were married couples living together, 10.8% had a female householder with no husband present, 4.6% had a male householder with no wife present, and 26.8% were non-families. 20.7% of all households were made up of individuals, and 5.7% had someone living alone who was 65 years of age or older. The average household size was 2.71 and the average family size was 3.14.

The median age in the city was 35.6 years. 26.5% of residents were under the age of 18; 7.4% were between the ages of 18 and 24; 30.7% were from 25 to 44; 27% were from 45 to 64; and 8.5% were 65 years of age or older. The gender makeup of the city was 49.1% male and 50.9% female.

=== 2000 census ===
As of the census of 2000, there were 44,942 people, 15,898 households, and 12,177 families living in the city. The population density was 1,330 inhabitants per square mile (510/km^{2}). There were 16,169 housing units at an average density of 477.6 per square mile (184.4/km^{2}). The racial makeup of the city was 93.46% White, 0.86% African American, 0.63% Native American, 2.54% Asian, 0.02% Pacific Islander, 0.75% from other races, and 1.75% from two or more races. 1.72% of the population were Hispanic or Latino people of any race.

There were 15,898 households, out of which 41.1% had children under the age of 18 living with them, 61.1% were married couples living together, 11.1% had a female householder with no husband present, and 23.4% were non-families. 17.0% of all households were made up of individuals, and 3.3% had someone living alone who was 65 years of age or older. The average household size was 2.82 and the average family size was 3.19.

In the city, the population was spread out, with 29.1% under the age of 18, 8.7% from 18 to 24, 34.8% from 25 to 44, 22.0% from 45 to 64, and 5.3% who were 65 years of age or older. The median age was 33 years. For every 100 females, there were 100.2 males. For every 100 females age 18 and over, there were 98.1 males.

The median income for a household in the city was $59,219, and the median income for a family was $63,831. Males had a median income of $40,620 versus $30,452 for females. The per capita income for the city was $22,777. 3.0% of the population and 2.1% of families were below the poverty line. Out of the total population, 3.0% of those under the age of 18 and 3.7% of those 65 and older were living below the poverty line.

== Economy ==
=== Top employers ===
According to Blaine's 2022 Comprehensive Annual Financial Report, its largest employers are:

#	Employer	Employees
1	Aveda Corporation	700
2	Infinite campus	650
3	Cub Foods cooperation(four locations)	435
4	Carley Foundry, Inc.	350
5	National Sports Center	325
6	Walmart Stores, Inc.	300
7	Target Corporation	270
8	The Home Depot (two locations)	230
9	City of Blaine	230
10	Lowe's	140

== Sports ==
The 3M Open, a PGA Tour event, is held at TPC Twin Cities.

The National Sports Center was the home of Minnesota's professional soccer teams for 23 years. From 1990 to 2003 and in 2008–2009 the National Sports Center was home to the now defunct Minnesota Thunder. After the Thunder folded, the sports center created the NSC Minnesota Stars for the 2009 season. The United States Soccer Federation ruled the stadium could not own the team, due to financial standards the stadium did not meet, and the team rebranded as the Minnesota Stars FC for the 2010–2012 seasons. Minnesota United FC, after being rebranded in 2013 to represent Minnesota soccer history, played at the National Sports Center until its promotion to Major League Soccer in 2017, and now plays at Allianz Field in St. Paul and uses the National Sports Center as a training facility.

The National Sports Center is also home to Victory Links Golf Course, a stadium with an artificial turf field, over 50 full-size soccer fields, an eight-sheet ice arena (the largest of its kind in the world), an expo center, and a meeting and convention facility.

== Parks and recreation ==
Blaine has 66 parks and hundreds of miles of trails. Its parks include Aquartore Park, Happy Acres Park, Lexington Athletic Complex, the Blaine Baseball Complex, and Lakeside Commons Park. The Blaine Wetland Sanctuary is 500 acres of protected open space featuring a boardwalk and trails.

== Government ==
United States presidential election results for Blaine, Minnesota
Year	Republican		Democratic		Third party(ies)	
Year	No.	%	No.	%	No.	%
2024	19,107	46.99%	20,063	49.34%	1,496	3.68%
2020	18,420	46.21%	20,431	51.25%	1,011	2.54%
2016	15,995	47.06%	14,849	43.69%	3,141	9.24%
2012	15,741	48.03%	16,273	49.66%	757	2.31%
2008	14,738	47.73%	15,493	50.18%	646	2.09%
2004	14,438	51.35%	13,372	47.56%	306	1.09%
2000	9,808	44.67%	10,783	49.11%	1,368	6.23%

2025-2026 Blaine City Council:

- Mayor: Tim Sanders
- Ward One Councilmembers: Tom Newland and Chris Ford
- Ward Two Councilmembers: Leslie Larson and Jess Robertson
- Ward Three Councilmembers: Chris Massoglia and Terra Fleming

Blaine is in Minnesota's 6th congressional district, represented by Tom Emmer, a Republican. Its U.S. senators are Amy Klobuchar and Tina Smith, both Democrats. Blaine is represented by Nolan West and Matt Norris in the Minnesota House of Representatives and Michael Kreun in the Minnesota Senate.

== Education ==
Three different school districts serve Blaine. The Anoka-Hennepin School District covers most of the city, from Highway 65 to University Avenue north of 99th Ave NE and the areas north of Cloud Drive, and zigzags through the Lakes neighborhood up to Main Street, where it covers everything north all the way across to Sunset, the city's eastern edge. The Spring Lake Park School District covers nearly everything south of 99th Ave NE, the east side of Highway 65 north to where it bumps into District 11 and east to Lexington, where it bumps into the Centennial School District. District 12—Centennial Schools—covers east of Lexington almost up to Main Street and everything south and east of Interstate 35W.

There are three high schools in the city: Blaine High School in the Anoka-Hennepin School District, Centennial High School in the Centennial School District, and Paladin Career and Technical High School, a public charter school. In addition, some Blaine students attend Spring Lake Park High School in the Spring Lake Park School District.

Rasmussen University, a private, for-profit school offering bachelor's and associate degrees, has a location in Blaine.

== Notable people ==
- Emily Brown, professional ice hockey player for the Seattle Torrent
- Gabby Rosenthal, professional ice hockey player for the Vancouver Goldeneyes.
