= Tim Sanders (politician) =

American politician (born 1982)

Mayor of Blaine
- Incumbent
- Assumed office January 1, 2021
- Preceded by: Tom Ryan

Member of the Minnesota House of Representatives from the 37B district 51A (2009–2013)
- In office January 6, 2009 – January 2, 2017
- Preceded by: Scott Kranz
- Succeeded by: Nolan West

Personal details
- Born: June 2, 1982 (age 44)
- Party: Republican Party of Minnesota
- Spouse: Farrah
- Children: 3
- Education: University of Minnesota
- Profession: insurance representative

Timothy A. Sanders (born 1982) is an American politician serving as the mayor of Blaine, Minnesota, since 2021 and a former member of the Minnesota House of Representatives. A member of the Republican Party of Minnesota, he represented District 37B, which included parts of Anoka County, in the northern part of the Twin Cities metropolitan area, from 2009 to 2017, having decided not to seek reelection in 2016.

== Early life, education, and career ==
Sanders grew up in a military family on Wright Patterson Air Force Base near Dayton, Ohio. He graduated from the University of Minnesota in Minneapolis, earning his B.A. in political science with a minor in history. Sanders worked as an intern for former U.S. Representative Jim Ramstad in his Minnetonka office. He is also a commercial insurance representative for Fireman's Fund Insurance Company.

== Minnesota House of Representatives ==
Sanders was first elected in 2008, succeeding first-term Representative Scott Kranz, who moved out of the district. He was reelected in 2010, 2012, and 2014. He did not seek reelection in 2016.

== Blaine elections ==
In 2020, Sanders was elected to a four-year term as mayor of Blaine, Minnesota, and assumed office on 1 January 2021, replacing retiring mayor Tom Ryan.

== Controversies ==
=== Nonprofit mismanagement: Refocus Recovery ===
According to an investigation by KARE, Sanders is alleged to have engaged in nonprofit mismanagement, fraud, and illegal billing of taxpayer dollars meant to help people in addiction recovery as president and executive director of Refocus Recovery. There is an active investigation into Refocus Recovery by the Minnesota Attorney General and the Human Services Inspector General.

In May 2024, KARE reported that the Federal Bureau of Investigation (FBI) is investigating Refocus Recovery, writing: "After KARE 11 reports of alleged Medicaid billing irregularities, multiple sources confirm a federal probe of Kyros and Refocus Recovery."

=== Personal financial dealings: the Ball Park ===
According to the Minnesota Reformer: "The mayor of Blaine is an investor in a baseball-themed restaurant [The Ball Park] going up near a planned massive sports entertainment district that may include a taxpayer-subsidized minor league baseball stadium." Residents have questioned whether Sanders has a conflict of interest, and say the restaurant project won approval in March with little public notice while a now-vocal council opponent was out of town.
