= John Heinrich (politician) =

American politician

Member of the Minnesota House of Representatives from the 35A district
- In office January 8, 2019 – January 2, 2023
- Preceded by: Abigail Whelan
- Succeeded by: Zack Stephenson

Personal details
- Born: 1978 or 1979 (age 46–47)
- Party: Republican
- Spouse: Jessica
- Children: 3

John Heinrich (born 1978/1979) is an American politician and former member of the Minnesota House of Representatives. A member of the Republican Party of Minnesota, he represented District 35A in the northwestern Twin Cities metropolitan area.

== Early life, education, and career ==
Heinrich graduated from Meadow Creek Christian School in 1998. He was a military police officer in the 4th Marine Division of the United States Marine Corps from 1999 to 2007.

== Minnesota House of Representatives ==
Heinrich was first elected to the Minnesota House of Representatives in 2018.

== Personal life ==
Heinrich and his wife, Jessica, have three children. He resides in Anoka, Minnesota.
