= Paladin Career and Technical High School =

Charter school in Minnesota

Location
- 10220 Goldenrod St NW; Coon Rapids, Minnesota 55448; United States
- Coordinates: 45.12735°N 93.26065°W

Information
- School type: Public charter school
- Motto: We've Got Your Back
- Opened: 2002-2003
- Director: Brandon Wait
- Staff: 38
- Grades: 9-12
- Enrollment: 257 (2024-2025)
- Campus type: Urban
- Colors: Black and Gold
- Website: www.pcths.org

Paladin Career and Technical High School is a Minnesota public charter school in Coon Rapids, Minnesota, in the United States. It opened in September 2002 and teaches grades 9–12.

== Curriculum ==
Students must meet the education requirements of the state to obtain a high school diploma.

== Governance ==
Paladin Career and Technical High School is a Minnesota non-profit and is designated as a 501(c)3 by the Internal Revenue Service. The school board is elected by the school community, in accordance with Minnesota Statute 124D.10.

== Student population ==
The school serves an at-risk population of students, which may include those with family, health or other social problems. In 2009, the school was mentioned in an article about the growing homeless population in the northern metro area of Minneapolis–Saint Paul.
