= Bunker Beach =

Outdoor waterpark in Minnesota

- Interactive map of Bunker Beach
- Slogan: "Where the Waves of Fun Never End!" or "1,000,001 Gallons of Fun!"
- Location: Bunker Hills Regional Park, 701 County Parkway A, Coon Rapids, Minnesota, United States
- Coordinates: 45°12′37″N 93°17′1″W
- Owner: Bunker Hills Regional Park
- Opened: June 12, 1988; 38 years ago
- Previous names: Bunker Pool
- Operating season: Memorial Day–Labor Day
- Visitors per annum: 120,000 (2022)
- Area: 10 acres (4.0 ha)
- Website: Official website

Bunker Beach is a water park in Coon Rapids, Minnesota, United States, within Bunker Hills Regional Park, run by the Anoka County Parks and Recreation Department. It is Minnesota's largest water park, featuring a wave pool, water slides, and other water features.

== History ==
In 1986, Anoka County announced several additions to its Bunker Hills Park, including a $1 million wave pool to be completed in 1988. It would be the first wave pool in Minnesota. By its completion, the project cost $1.4 million ($3.81 million in 2025); officials hoped that the wave pool would prove to be a profitable venture, unlike traditional rectangular pools. The 25,000 square foot (2,300 m^{2}) pool opened on June 12, 1988, and for its first several weeks sold out at 800 admissions each day. In its first season 101,362 people visited the pool, with ticket and concession revenue totaling $216,637 and $137,029, respectively. Prior to the 1989 season, a sand volleyball court, picnic shelters, and an additional concession stand were added to the waterpark.

Prior to the 2003 season the park was expanded beyond the wave pool with a gradual-entry pool, a sand play area, and two water slides.

Attendance in the 2008 season was 95,605. A $3.5 million ($5.25 million in 2025) renovation began place at the end of the 2009 season, adding a 900 foot (270 m) lazy river, two tube water slides, a leisure pool, and an activity pool with a basketball hoop and climbing wall. Additional concession stands and a lifeguard lounge were also added. Attendance in the 2009 season was 69,680 visitors.

After the waterpark closed in 2020 due to the COVID-19 pandemic, officials began a $6.5 million ($7.72 million in 2025) rebuild of the 33-year-old wave pool, which had become more difficult to maintain. The new pool features heated water and a 3,000-square-foot, child-friendly area. A splash pad was added in 2023, replacing a sandbox and playground equipment.

== Amenities ==
Bunker Beach is Minnesota's largest water park, spread across ten acres. Bunker Beach has a number of attractions for visitors. The primary attraction of the park is a wave pool capable of holding 1,000 swimmers. It also has a zero-entry lagoon and adventure pool, lazy river, climbing walls, waterslides, and pool basketball courts. Park capacity is 2,500.
