= Abigail Whelan =

American politician from Minnesota

Member of the Minnesota House of Representatives from the 35A district
- In office January 6, 2015 – January 7, 2019
- Preceded by: Jim Abeler
- Succeeded by: John Heinrich

Personal details
- Born: January 13, 1988 (age 38) Anoka, Minnesota
- Party: Republican
- Education: University of Michigan

Abigail Whelan (born January 13, 1988) is an American politician from Minnesota and a former member of the Minnesota House of Representatives. A member of the Republican Party of Minnesota, she represented District 35A, which included a portion of Anoka County, Minnesota.

== Education and career ==
Whelan graduated from Anoka High School in 2006. She attended the University of Minnesota, where she majored in political science and history and minored in economics. During her time there, she studied abroad in England and traveled extensively through Europe. She earned her degree in 2010. After working for a time at the Minnesota Legislature, Whelan returned to the University of Minnesota Humphrey School of Public Affairs on a scholarship and earned her master's degree in public policy in 2013. From September 2012 until May 2013, Whelan worked as a research/teaching assistant. Before the 2014 election, Whelan worked locally with a home health care agency in business development.

== Minnesota House of Representatives ==
=== Elections ===
Whelan was elected on November 4, 2014 defeating the (DFL) nominee, Peter Perovich, by 20.09% or 2616 votes.

2014 Minnesota State Representative- House 35A
Party	Candidate	Votes	%	±%
Democratic (DFL)	Peter Perovich	5192	39.86	
Republican	Abigail Whelan	7808	59.95	

=== Tenure ===
Whelan was sworn in on January 6, 2015. During her time as a state representative, she expressed disapproval of fetal tissue research at the University of Minnesota.

=== Committee assignments ===
For the 89th Legislative Session, Backer is a part of:

- Education Innovation Policy Committee
- Higher Education Policy & Finance Committee
- Taxes Subcommittee: Property Tax & Local Government Finance Division
- Transportation Policy & Finance Committee.

Minnesota House of Representatives
Preceded by Jim Abeler	Member of the House of Representatives from District 35A; 2015–2019	Succeeded by John Heinrich
