= 2009–10 Minnesota State–Mankato Mavericks women's ice hockey season =

2009–10 Minnesota State University, Mankato women's ice hockey season
- Conference: WCHA

Rankings
- USA Today/USA Hockey Magazine: Not ranked
- USCHO.com/CBS College Sports: Not ranked

Record

Coaches and captains
- Head coach: Eric Means

The 2009-10 Minnesota State Mavericks women's ice hockey season took place under head coach Eric Means.

== Offseason ==
- May 11: Eric Means was named head coach
- June 19: Shari Vogt was named assistant coach
- August 4: Jon Austin was named assistant coach; Dean Williamson joined the staff as a volunteer assistant coach
- September 9: Defenseman Holly Snyder and forward Christina Lee were named as WCHA All-Stars; they were among 22 conference players to face the 2009-10 U.S women’s national team in St. Paul, Minn. on September 25.

== Regular season ==
- January 14: Junior forward Nina Tikkinen was named to Finland's 2010 Winter Olympic Hockey Team

=== Standings ===
2009–10 Western Collegiate Hockey Association standings
	Conference								Overall					
	GP	W	L	T	SOW	PTS	GF	GA	GP	W	L	T	GF	GA
Minnesota Duluth†*	28	20	6	2	1	43	90	55	41	31	8	2	138	83
Minnesota†	28	18	6	4	3	43	91	49	40	26	9	5	129	74
St. Cloud State	28	11	11	6	4	32	70	77	37	15	14	8	96	103
Wisconsin	28	15	12	1	0	31	84	63	36	18	15	3	107	82
Ohio State	28	12	13	3	1	28	90	94	37	17	15	5	122	117
Bemidji State	28	9	12	7	3	28	47	64	38	12	19	7	65	98
Minnesota State	28	5	18	5	3	18	49	92	34	7	22	5	66	117
North Dakota	28	7	19	2	0	16	44	71	34	8	22	4	61	92
Championship: † indicates conference regular season champion; * indicates conference tournament champion Updated July 21, 2024

=== Roster ===
Number	Name	Position	Height	Class
1	Alli Altmann	G	5-8	So.
3	Lauren Zrust	F	5-6	Fr.
4	Amy Udvig	D	5-3	Jr.
7	Kala Buganski	F	5-9	Sr.
8	Nina Tikkinen	F	5-6	Jr.
9	Ariel Mackley	F	5-6	So.
10	Christina Lee	F	5-5	Sr.
12	Moira O’Connor	F	5-6	So.
13	Ida Clark	D	5-3	Sr.
14	Erika Magnusson	F/D	5-5	Fr.
15	Ashley Young	F	5-3	Sr.
16	Emmi Leinonen	F	5-5	So.
17	Jenna Hewitt	F	5-5	Sr.
18	Holly Snyder	D	5-7	Sr.
19	Lisa Edman	F	5-5	Jr.
21	Jenna Peterson	F/D	5-8	So.
23	Kathleen Rosso	D	5-5	Sr.
29	Jackie Otto	D	5-6	So.
39	Paige Thunder	G	5-9	Jr.

=== Schedule ===
Date	Opponent	Location	Time	Score	Record
Friday, October 2nd 2009	Minnesota Whitecaps	Mankato, Minn. (ASA)	7:30 p.m.	CANCELLED	0-0-0
Friday, October 9, 2009	Maine	Orono, Maine	7:00 p.m.	Win, 5-2,	1-0-0
Saturday, October 10, 2009	Maine	Orono, Maine	2:00 p.m.	Win, 2-1	2-0-0
Saturday, October 17, 2009	North Dakota*	Grand Forks, N.D.	2:07 p.m.	Win, 4-2	3-0-0
Sunday, October 18, 2009	North Dakota*	Grand Forks, N.D.	2:07 p.m.	Tie, 1-1	3-0-1
Friday, October 30, 2009	Ohio State*	Columbus, Ohio	7:07 p.m.	Loss, 7-6	3-1-1
Saturday, October 31, 2009	Ohio State*	Columbus, Ohio	7:07 p.m.	Loss, 4-1	3-2-1
Friday, November 6, 2009	Bemidji State*	Mankato, Minn. (ASA)	7:07 p.m.	Tie, 2-2	3-2-2
Saturday, November 7, 2009	Bemidji State*	Mankato, Minn. (ASA)	3:07 p.m.	Loss, 3-1	3-3-2
Friday, November 13, 2009	Minnesota*	Mankato, Minn. (ASA)	7:07 p.m.	Loss, 4-1	3-4-2
Saturday, November 14, 2009	Minnesota*	Mankato, Minn. (ASA)	3:07 p.m.	Tie, 1-1	3-4-3
Friday, November 20, 2009	Minnesota Duluth*	Duluth, Minn.	7:07 p.m.	Win, 3-2	4-4-3
Saturday, November 21, 2009	Minnesota Duluth*	Duluth, Minn.	7:07 p.m.	Loss, 7-1	4-5-3
Friday, December 4, 2009	St. Cloud State*	Mankato, Minn. (ASA)	7:07 p.m.	Tie, 4-4	4-5-4
Saturday, December 5, 2009	St. Cloud State*	St. Cloud, Minn.	7:07 p.m.	Loss, 0-1	4-6-4
Friday, December 11, 2009	Wisconsin*	Mankato, Minn. (ASA)	7:07 p.m.	Loss, 0-3	4-7-4
Saturday, December 12, 2009	Wisconsin*	Mankato, Minn. (ASA)	3:07 p.m.	Loss, 2-6	4-8-4
Saturday, January 2nd 2010	Mercyhurst	St. Cloud, Minn.	12:07 p.m.		
Sunday, January 3, 2010	Providence	St. Cloud, Minn.	12:07 p.m.	4-4	
Friday, January 8, 2010	Bemidji State*	Bemidji, Minn.	7:07 p.m.	2-2	
Saturday, January 9, 2010	Bemidji State*	Bemidji, Minn.	3:07 p.m.	0-3	
Friday, January 15th 2010	Ohio State*	Mankato, Minn. (ASA)	7:07 p.m.		
Saturday, January 16th 2010	Ohio State*	Mankato, Minn. (ASA)	3:07 p.m.		
Friday, January 22, 2010	Minnesota Duluth*	Mankato, Minn. (ASA)	7:07 p.m.	Loss, 3-1	
Saturday, January 23, 2010	Minnesota Duluth*	Mankato, Minn. (ASA)	3:07 p.m.	Loss, 2-1	
Friday, January 29, 2010	Minnesota*	Minneapolis, Minn.	7:07 p.m.	Loss, 4-2	
Saturday, January 30, 2010	Minnesota*	Minneapolis, Minn.	4:07 p.m.	Loss, 4-1	
Friday, February 5, 2010	St. Cloud State*	St. Cloud, Minn.	2:07 p.m.	Loss, 1-6	
Sunday, February 7, 2010	St. Cloud State*	Mankato, Minn. (ASA)	3:07 p.m.	Win, 4-0	
Friday, February 12, 2010	Wisconsin*	Madison, Wis.	2:07 p.m.	Loss, 3-5	
Saturday, February 13th 2010	Wisconsin*	Madison, Wis.	2:07 p.m.		
Friday, February 19th 2010	North Dakota*	Mankato, Minn. (ASA)	7:07 p.m.		
Saturday, February 20th 2010	North Dakota*	Mankato, Minn. (ASA)	3:07 p.m.		
Friday, February 26th 2010	WCHA Playoffs *	TBD	TBD		

== Player stats ==
= Indicates team leader

=== Skaters ===
Player	Games	Goals	Assists	Points	Points/game	PIM	GWG	PPG	SHG
Ashley Young	34	9	15	24	0.7059	24	1	1	0
Lauren Smith	33	7	16	23	0.6970	0	0	1	2
Christina Lee	34	5	14	19	0.5588	24	0	1	0
Emmi Leinonen	31	10	8	18	0.5806	4	2	5	0
Moira O'Connor	34	7	8	15	0.4412	32	0	1	0
Kala Buganski	29	6	7	13	0.4483	40	1	2	1
Holly Snyder	34	2	8	10	0.2941	64	1	0	0
Nina Tikkinen	19	2	8	10	0.5263	24	0	0	0
Lisa Edman	34	6	2	8	0.2353	6	0	3	0
Amy Udvig	32	1	5	6	0.1875	32	0	1	0
Lauren Zrust	32	4	1	5	0.1563	4	1	0	0
Jackie Otto	34	2	3	5	0.1471	16	1	0	0
Ariel Mackley	34	1	3	4	0.1176	20	0	0	0
Jenna Hewitt	34	2	1	3	0.0882	0	0	0	0
Ida Clark	33	2	1	3	0.0909	10	0	0	0
Kathleen Rosso	29	0	3	3	0.1034	44	0	0	0
Jenna Peterson	34	0	2	2	0.0588	12	0	0	0
Erika Magnusson	33	0	2	2	0.0606	29	0	0	0
Jamie Weiss	16	0	0	0	0.0000	0	0	0	0
Paige Thunder	10	0	0	0	0.0000	0	0	0	0
Alli Altmann	30	0	0	0	0.0000	2	0	0	0

=== Goaltenders ===
Player	Games	Wins	Losses	Ties	Goals against	Minutes	GAA	Shutouts	Saves	Save %
Alli Altmann	30	7	17	4	88	1711	3.0867	1	769	.897
Paige Thunder	10	0	5	1	28	387	4.3443	0	163	.853

== Postseason ==
- February 27: After 3 hours and 47 minutes, Emily West scored at 1:16 of triple overtime to eliminate the MSU-Mankato Mavericks.

=== WCHA Playoffs ===
Date	Location	Opponent	Score	Notes
Feb. 26	Ridder Arena	Minnesota	5-8	
Feb. 27	Ridder Arena	Minnesota	3-4 (3 OT)	Emily West gets the game winner

== Awards and honors ==
- Alli Altmann, WCHA Defensive Player of the Week (Week of February 17, 2010)
- Emmi Leinonen, WCHA Offensive Player of the Week
- Ashley Young, Frozen Four Skills Competition participant
