= Coon Rapids Dam =

Dam in Minnesota, U.S.

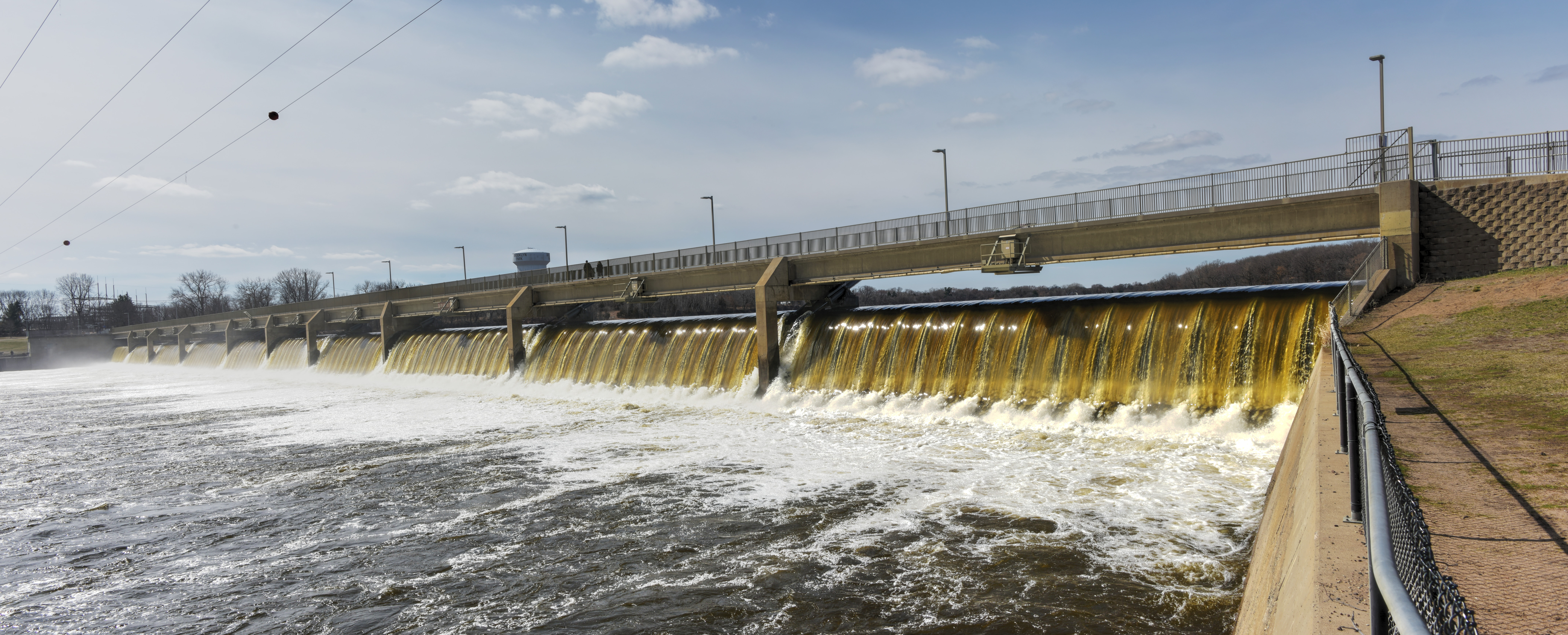
- Coon Rapids Dam in 2021

- Location within Minnesota
- Interactive map of Coon Rapids Dam
- Country: United States
- Location: Anoka County and Hennepin County, Minnesota
- Coordinates: 45°08′38″N 93°18′41″W
- Purpose: Originally power generation; recreational since 1969
- Status: Operational
- Construction began: 1913; 113 years ago
- Opening date: 1914; 112 years ago
- Built by: H. M. Byllesby & Company (original dam)
- Owner: Three Rivers Park District

Dam and spillways
- Type of dam: Concrete gravity dam
- Impounds: Mississippi River
- Height: 19 ft (5.8 m)
- Length: 1,070 ft (330 m)

Reservoir
- Surface area: 600 acres
- Maximum length: 6 mi (9.7 km)

Power Station
- Operator: Northern States Power Company
- Commission date: 1914
- Decommission date: 1966

The Coon Rapids Dam is a concrete gravity dam on the Mississippi River located in Brooklyn Park and Coon Rapids, Minnesota. It is approximately 12 miles (19 km) north of downtown Minneapolis. Between 1914 and 1966, it provided hydroelectric power generation for northern Twin Cities suburbs. Since 1969 it has been used primarily for recreation, with two county parks on either side connected by a 12-foot-wide walkway for cyclists and pedestrians. Suffering from serious wear and tear by the mid-1990s, it was entirely reconstructed from the foundations in 1997 and received further modifications in the early 2010s. As the southernmost dam on the Mississippi that does not have any locks, it is the theoretical northern terminus of the navigable portion of the Mississippi River. (Note: In 2015, the Upper St. Anthony Falls lock was permanently closed to prevent the spread of invasive species, namely Asian carp. As such, Saint Anthony Falls is currently the practical limit even though the lock still exists and theoretically allows passage up to the Coon Rapids Dam.) The dam is owned by Hennepin County's Three Rivers Park District; Anoka County owns and operates a park on its side of the river.

== History ==
=== Original hydroelectric dam ===
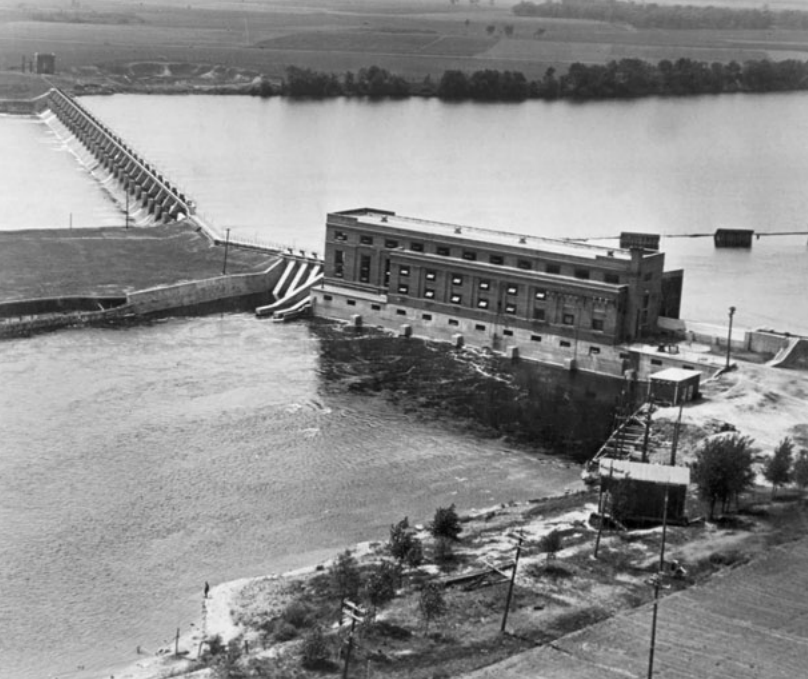
The original Coon Rapids dam and powerhouse in 1928

In 1898, plans began to form to build a hydroelectric power generation dam near Coon Rapids, Minnesota. While originally conceived as a private venture, in 1911 Congress approved federal funding for the dam to make it a joint private-public operation. Land was purchased from John Dunn, after whom the island in the middle of the channel is named. H. M. Byllesby & Company began construction the dam in January 1913 and was completed in March 1914; power generation began in August 1914. Over 42,000 cubic yards of concrete were used in the construction of the dam. It had 28 steel gates which were raised and lowered to allow water to flow under them. One of the original steel gates is available for viewing on the Anoka County side of the dam.

The dam does not contain a lock. In November 1913, after construction started, the St. Anthony Falls Commercial Club lobbied for Congress to add a lock to the dam, with the assistance of U.S. Representative George Ross Smith. However, as the river above the dam was deemed not to be navigable, the power company was not required to build the $150,000 lock. The lack of a lock makes it the theoretical northernmost navigable point on the Mississippi River; however, since 2015, the Upper St. Anthony Falls lock has been sealed to prevent the spread of Asian carp and as such Saint Anthony Falls in Minneapolis are the current practical limit.

=== Transition to recreational use ===
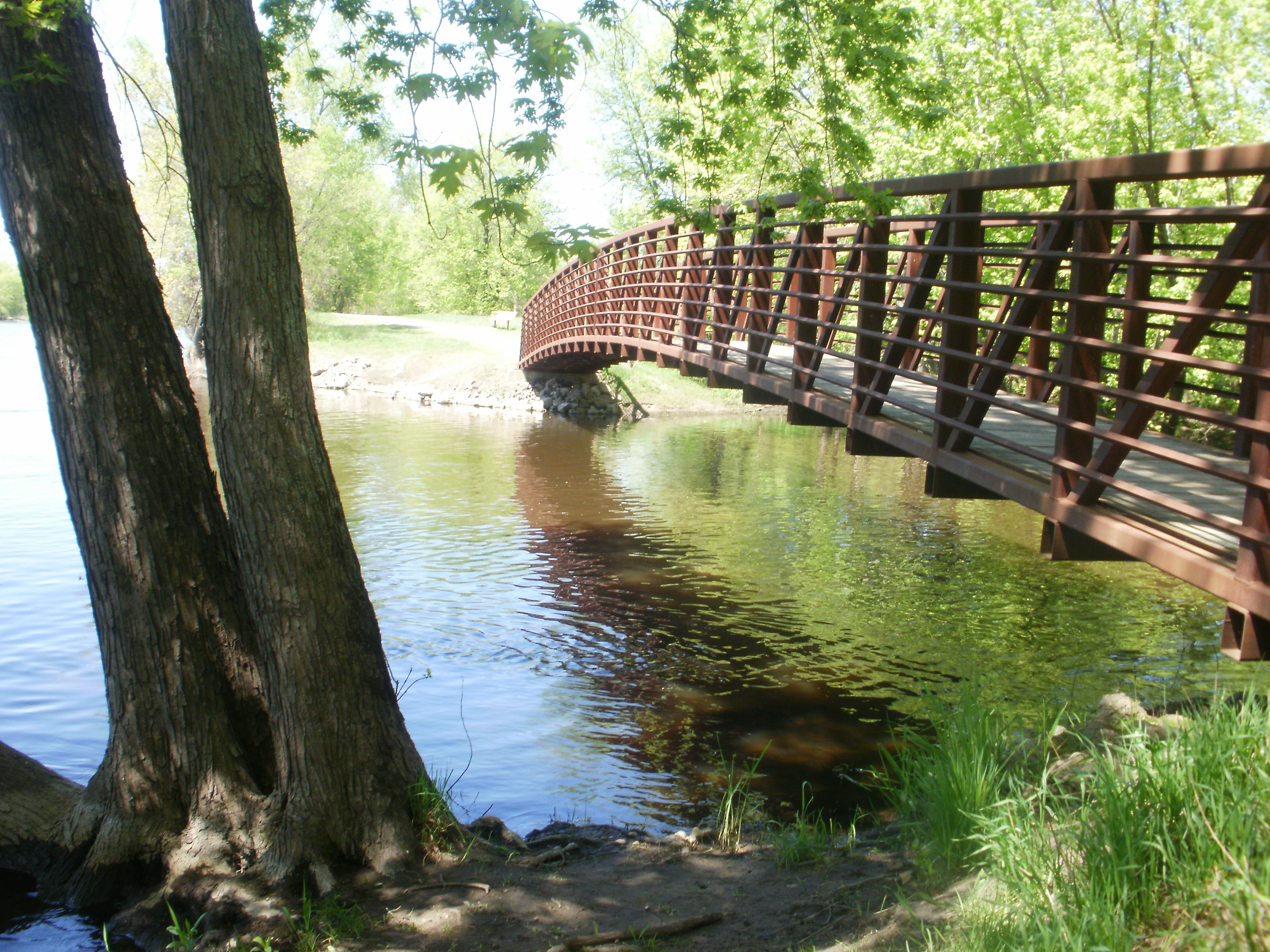
Pedestrian bridge where Coon Creek meets the Mississippi River on the Anoka County side of the park

By the 1960s, hydroelectric generation on the dam was no longer profitable due to increasing cheapness of coal and rising costs of dam upkeep. Power generation was halted in 1966. The plant was demolished in 1967, and in 1969 Northern States Power Company donated the dam to the Hennepin County Parks District. A walkway was constructed across the dam in 1977, and the park opened in 1978.

In 1994, Anoka County entered a thirty-year lease agreement with Three Rivers Park District for the Anoka County side of the dam. Due to the cost of upkeep, Three Rivers Park District considered selling the dam to the Minnesota Department for Natural Resources in 2010, resulting in a dispute with Anoka County in 2011 which caused Three Rivers Park district to revoke the lease. Anoka County ended up purchasing the leased land from the park district.

=== 1997 reconstruction ===
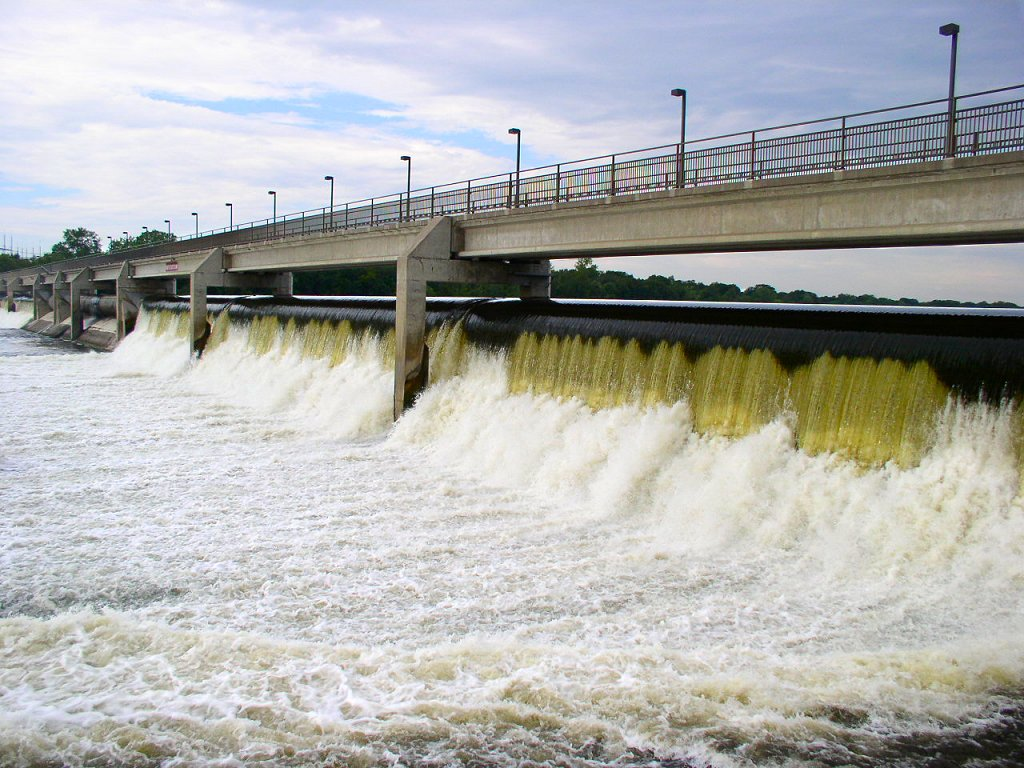
The dam after 1997 reconstruction with rubber bladders visible on the left

By the 1990s, the dam was facing serious wear and tear, and was rated a "significant hazard" by the Army Corps of Engineers with severe effects predicted if the dam collapsed, including possible deaths. Repairs were recommended within five years. The original concrete pilings were wearing away, foundation soil was eroding, and many of the twenty-eight wooden and metal gates were broken and twisted as a result of ice. From 1995 to 1997, Hennepin County Parks carried out a $6.2 million two-year plan to reconstruct the dam. While the original footings were used, the rest of the dam was entirely rebuilt. The new dam consisted of four gates made of inflatable rubber bladders. Tears in the bladders requiring repair occurred in 1997 and 2000, resulting in a complete replacement of the old bladders with an upgraded design by 2002.

=== Later renovation ===
With the spread of Asian carp further up the Mississippi, the inflatable rubber bladder gate design was considered ineffective at preventing the migration of carp. Between 2013 and 2014, the bladders were replaced by nine steel gates in a $16 million project. As part of the same renovation, a 450-foot stilling basin was installed, replacing a deteriorating concrete apron. During this time, the dam walkway was closed; it reopened in July 2015.

There have been proposals to restore power generation at the dam. Proposals by the park district from 2009 proposed a $30 million plant which would generate electricity for over 4,000 homes. The proposals have not gained traction.

== Specifications ==
The current dam consists of a main 1,000-foot (300 m) section with a 103-foot (31 m) control gate and nine additional steel gates, connecting the Hennepin County side to Dunn Island on the Anoka County side of the river. A shorter 400-foot (120 m) section, originally containing the 200-foot-long (61 m) powerhouse, connects the island to the Anoka County side. The difference between the headwater and tailwater is usually around 19 feet (5.8 m), with a 13-foot difference between the dam and the original riverbed. The pool is around 600 acres, with the effects of the dam diminishing after the Ferry Street bridge in Champlin, about six miles upstream.

== Recreation ==
Three Rivers Park District, a special park district serving the Twin Cities Hennepin, Carver, Dakota, Scott, and Ramsey counties, owns the dam and operates the 160-acre Mississippi Gateway Regional Park on the southwest side of the dam. Anoka County Parks owns and operates a 446-acre park, Coon Rapids Dam Regional Park, on the northeast of the dam. Many species, including mink, beaver, hawks, osprey, deer, turtles and river otters, can be spotted in the parks. Both parks are sites for the National Parks Passport Program. Hiking, biking, and fishing are among the recreational activities available at the parks. Panoramic views of the river are offered on the dam's walkway, connecting the two parks for cyclists and walkers.

Cenaiko Lake, a 28 1/2 acre artificial lake on the Anoka County side, is stocked with Rainbow Trout; other species are present as well. Cenaiko Lake was created in 1987 and is named after former Anoka County commissioner Nick Cenaiko.

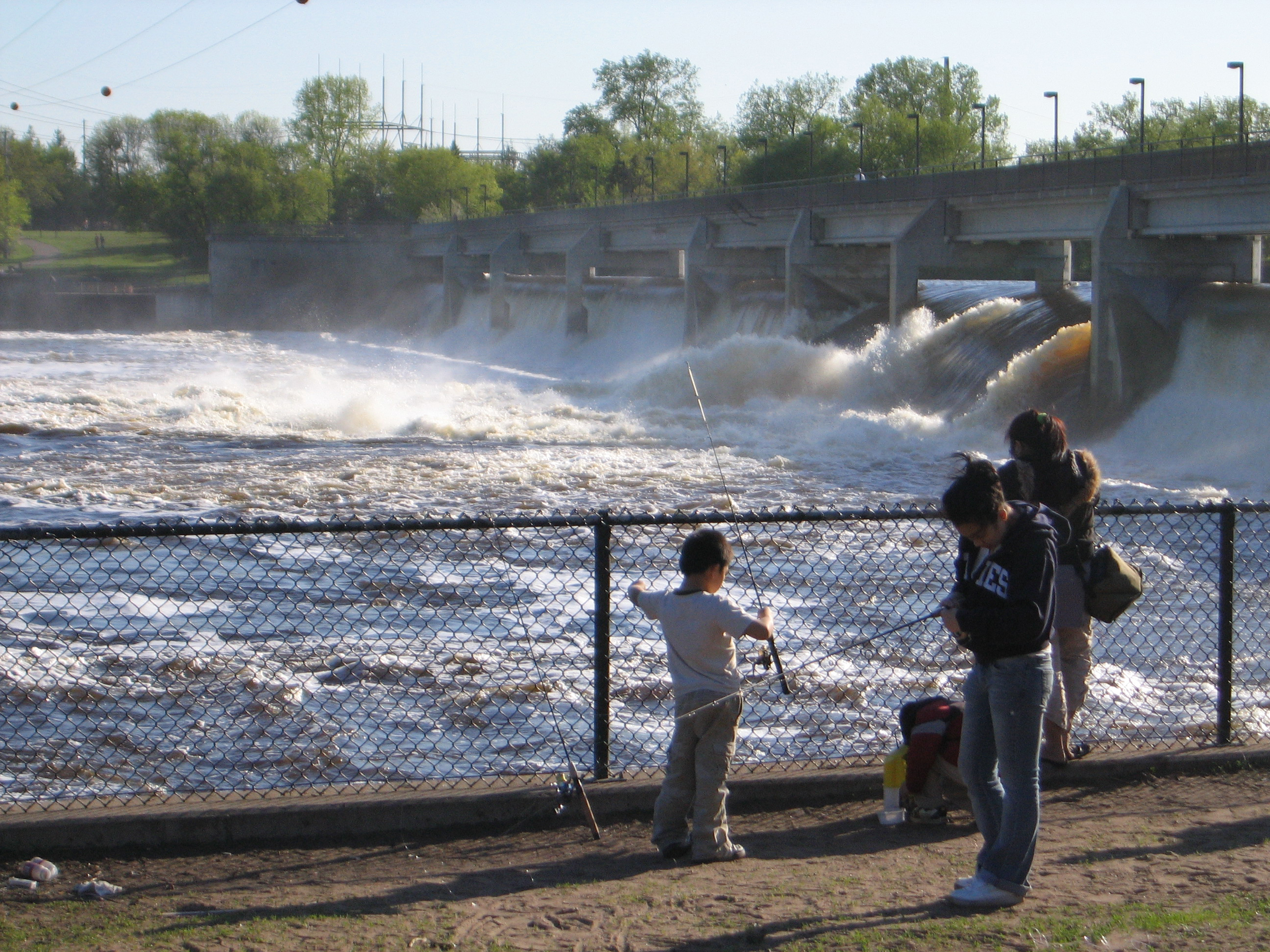
Fishing on the Anoka county side of the Coon Rapids Dam

Over 350,000 people visit the parks each year. The dam connects to Elm Creek Park Reserve via the Rush Creek Regional Trail.
