= Jen Boyles =

American writer, editor, and digital media CEO

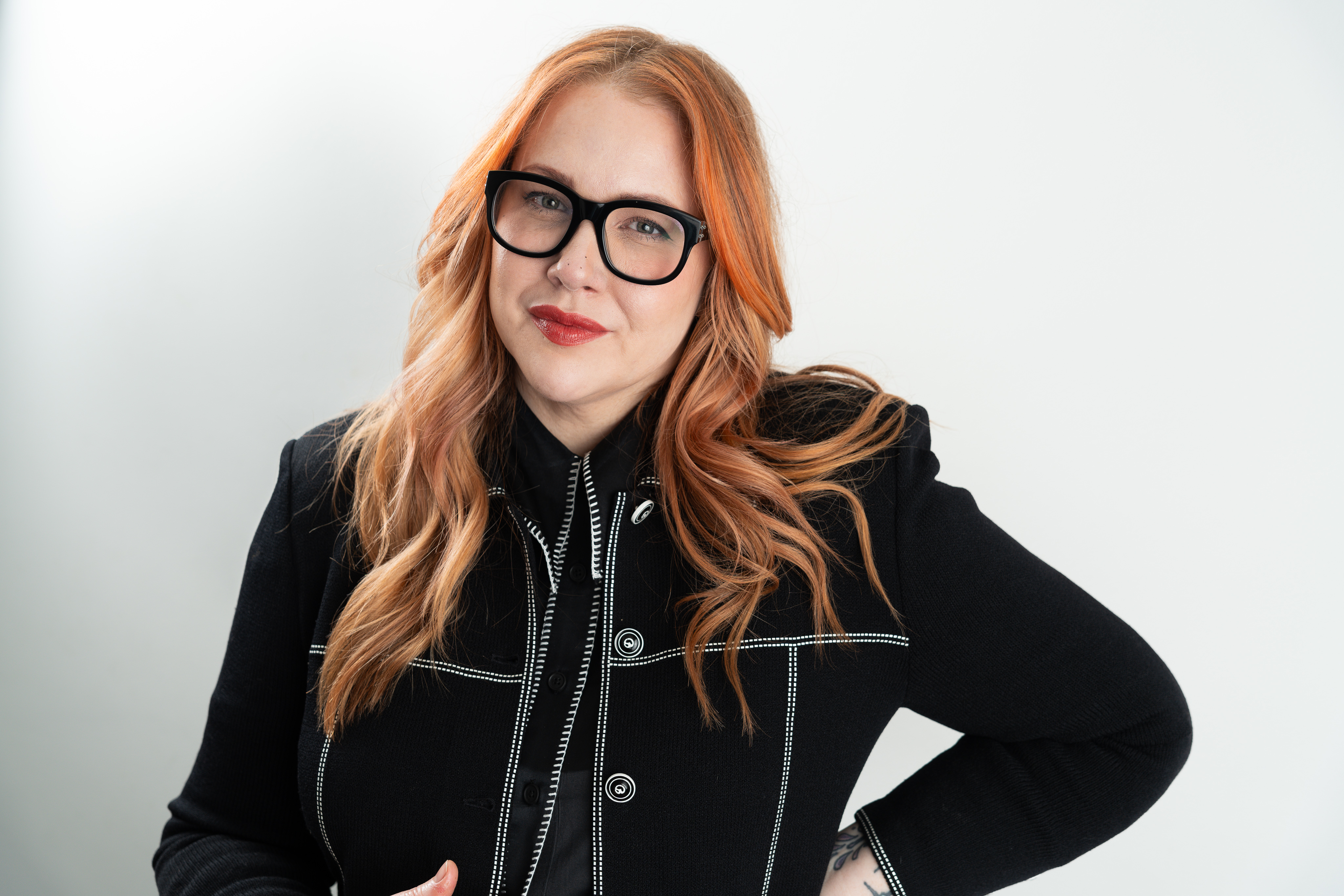
- Boyles in 2025
- Born: April 17, 1979 (age 47); Minneapolis, Minnesota
- Education: Hamline University
- Occupations: CEO, writer
- Website: www.jbd.agency

Jen Boyles is an American writer, editor, and digital media CEO from Minnesota.

== Early life ==
Boyles was born in 1979 in Minneapolis. She graduated from Anoka High School. She majored in English at Hamline University, where she was editor-in-chief of both the literary journal and the college newspaper, graduating in 2001.

== Career ==
=== Journalism ===
For more than a decade starting in the early 2000s, Boyles worked as a music and culture journalist, specializing in hip-hop, EDM and dance music. A 2005 profile on Boyles in Minneapolis publication Industry Magazine noted her influence in helping establish DJ culture as a serious art form, noting that she "helped to put Minneapolis on the map [for] electronic music." In the interview, Boyles described her writing style as "conversational and personal", looking for details that bring out a subject's "personality as well as their idiosyncrasies and especially their humanity." Her work includes interviews and profiles on dozens of electronica artists, coverage of major EDM festivals including Glastonbury (for Spin) and the annual Winter Music Conference for electronic music in Miami, Florida, and news articles on anti-drug legislation such as the RAVE Act and its detrimental effect on EDM culture. She was included in a 2003 article in Columbia Journalism Review on young, up-and-coming journalists.

Boyles was a writer and editor for Twin Cities alt-weekly City Pages for more than a decade, expanding the newspaper's coverage of the dance and electronic-music scene, as well as fashion, culture, and digital journalism. Her articles included a 2008 cover story on the Beastie Boys as well as features on prominent EDM and other musical artists including Sasha and Digweed, Tricky, The Herbaliser, Fischerspooner, Diplo, Wu-Tang Clan, Bootsy Collins, Hercules and Love Affair, DVS1, and Richie Hawtin, as well as profiles of rock musicians such as Fleetwood Mac's Lindsey Buckingham INXS’s Andrew Farriss, Def Leppard’s Phil Collen, and Dolores O'Riordan of the Cranberries.

She was also a senior contributor to national magazines URB and BPM. At URB, her feature articles included cover stories on Kid Sister & Flosstradamus and the burgeoning Chicago club scene, and Derrick Carter and Mark Farina. She profiled artists including Bad Boy Bill, High Contrast, Roni Size, Brother Ali, Danny Howells, DJ Klever, Kaskade, Mylo, King Kooba, Tall Paul, DJ Dan, Bassnectar, and King Britt. She regularly contributed album reviews, concert reviews, and coverage of the Miami Winter Music Conference for eight years. At BPM, she profiled Aeon Flux animator Peter Chung and house musicians Felix Da Housecat and Booka Shade, among others.

Boyles moved to Chicago in 2006, where she was web editor for NBC News. She returned to Minneapolis in 2008 and reprised her role as web editor for City Pages. Her work included expanding the paper's roster of blogs, as well as the popular City Pages Photobooth at local club First Avenue, which contributed to site traffic and relevance with younger audiences.

She has also written for Spin, Remix Magazine, Rosebud, Resonance Magazine, No Cover Magazine, UR Chicago, Newcity, Request Magazine, the Dallas Observer, Insomniac Magazine, Industry, the Minneapolis Star Tribune, Buzzine Los Angeles, CuePoint, and CNET’s download.com.

Boyles was a bridal columnist for Mpls.St.Paul Magazine in 2013. She also wrote about fashion for several publications, including producing two fashion issues for City Pages and overseeing its fashion blog The Dressing Room, as well as articles in Industry, and the Star Tribune.

Boyles co-founded several entrepreneurial startup publications, usually focusing on nightlife and electronica. In 2003, Boyles launched the Twin Cities-based electronica music and culture website Illypses.com. In 2007, she was editor-in-chief of Progressive Life & Style Magazine in Chicago, which covered topics such as music, fashion, and nightlife.

In 2020, to keep people connected to dance music artists during the COVID-19 pandemic, she launched a weekly music discussion series, "10 With Jen", via Facebook video. Her first guest was the Florida-based DJ and producer Dieselboy.

==== Awards ====
For her work as web editor of City Pages, Boyles won two Society of Professional Journalists Page One Awards for Best Website in 2011 and 2012. She was also creative director for the publication's Mad Men-themed Best Of The Twin Cities issue in 2011, which won an award for Best Issue, Newspaper 50,000+ Circulation.

=== Marketing ===
Starting in 2012, Boyles transitioned into marketing and advertising starting with the Minneapolis-based agency Olson, where she was content and social strategy director and founded the agency's first Content Lab, which created immersive digital content for brands such as Bauer Hockey, Bissell, Supercuts and Commerce Bank. She also contributed insights on Internet branding and content strategy to publications including Forbes, IZEA Worldwide, and Digiday. Business blog Total Entrepreneurs highlighted her campaign for the vacuum company Bissell, which focused on a photo series of pet owners and their animals to build brand awareness.

In 2018, she founded the digital communications agency and consulting firm JBD, which specializes in social media and digital communications strategy for large and mid-sized corporations. The agency's campaigns have included work for Paisley Park, Marvin Windows, Baker McKenzie, Borden Cheese, Great Clips, Plugrá Butter, M Health Fairview, and Medtronic.

=== Other work ===
Boyles is part of the house-music DJ duo Bunnymob, which she formed in 2012 with her husband Ian Traas, who is also a former dance music writer.

== Personal life ==
Boyles married Traas in 2013; they have a son.
