= Andover High School (Minnesota) =

Coordinates: 45°14′21″N 93°19′08″W

Location
- 2115 Andover Blvd NW; Andover, Minnesota 55304; United States

Information
- Type: Public
- Established: 2002
- School district: Anoka-Hennepin School District 11
- Principal: Tim Feine (interim)
- Staff: 88.58 (FTE)
- Enrollment: 1,796 (2023–2024)
- Student to teacher ratio: 20.28
- Athletics conference: Northwest Suburban Conference, Region: 4AA
- Mascot: Husky
- Rivals: Anoka High School
- Colors: Black, Gold, and White
- Website: https://andoverhs.ahschools.us/

Andover High School is a four-year public high school at 2115 Andover Blvd, Andover, Minnesota, United States. It is a part of Anoka-Hennepin School District 11 and is one of five traditional high schools in the district. It is the district's newest high school, opening in 2002. The first class graduated from Andover High School in 2004; the first class to have attended all four years of high school there graduated in 2006. It has students from both Andover and Ham Lake. The school's student population is 1750; they are 1% Native American, 1% Hispanic, 2% Asian, 3% African American, and 93% Caucasian.

== Academics ==
The school participates in the University of Minnesota's College in the Schools program and offers both honors as well as Advanced Placement classes.

Students can enroll in college-level courses through Post Secondary Enrollment Options. This program allows high school students to experience college coursework without paying college tuition fees. General education coursework is available to grades 11 and 12, and technical education coursework is available to grades 10, 11, and 12.

== Athletics and activities ==
Andover offers 22 varsity sports. It is part of the Northwest Suburban Conference and a member of the Minnesota State High School League (MSHSL). Andover's main rival is Anoka High School. Each year the two schools compete for the "A-Town Cup", which is awarded to the school that wins the greater number of athletic contests between the schools.

Andover High School and the other schools in the Anoka-Hennepin School District 11 have a combined team for adaptive sports. These students have the option to participate in bowling, floor hockey, soccer and softball.

2013–2014

In the fall of 2013, the boys' football team went 5–3. Andover participated in the section 4AAAAA section championship with Spring Lake Park. Andover had a first-round bye and a 42–3 win over Irondale to reach the championship. The band had its best season yet, receiving 1st at all its competitions along with multiple caption awards early in the season. It finished the season with a 2nd-place title at the Youth in Music Marching Band State Championships.

The girls' soccer team won the section championship to earn their first trip to state. The boys' soccer team went 14–1–1 in the regular season, including a 4–2 upset of top seed Blaine in the finals. It then won the section 7AA title with a 6–1 win over Saint Francis, a 1–0 double overtime win over Duluth East, and finally a 2–1 overtime win over Centennial. In the state tournament, Andover was unseeded and drew a first-round matchup with top seed Minneapolis Southwest. It won 2–1 with strong defensive play from seniors Ben Nivala and Matt Guhl. Andover lost 2–1 to North Saint Paul in the semifinals and tied for third place (1–1) with Edina.

2012–2013

In 2012, the marching band never finished lower than 2nd place, earning "Best Percussion" at nearly every competition, 4th place overall, and 3rd place in the state at the Youth In Music Marching Band State Championships.

2011–2012
Boys Track and Field won True Team, section 4AAA champs, NWSC champs and 7AA champs.

In 2011, one of the judges recognized one of the band's drill sets as excellent and something he had never seen in other high school bands. The judge was a past Madison Scouts visual technician, a world championship drum and bugle corps and one of the consecutive top 12 corps in Drum Corps International.

2010–2011
In 2010 the volleyball team was section champ and returned to the Minnesota State High School League for the fourth consecutive year. In the spring of 2011, the baseball team won the Gold Award for having cumulative Grade Point Average over 3.6.

In 2010, the marching band never placed below 2nd in competition.

2008–2009
Andover in Track and Field team was one of the top teams in the state and easily advanced through the True Team Section meet. Injuries hindered it later and it finished 5th at True Team State.

2007–2008
Andover was awarded its 7th-straight A-Town Cup after state appearances from 3 sports.

2006–2007
In 2007 the Andover boys track team won the True Team section beating runner-up Anoka, which qualified Andover for the True Team State meet in Stillwater, where it placed fourth. Other teams that went to state in 2007 included the football team, the boys' cross country team, and the volleyball team, which placed 2nd.

2004–2005

Andover Dance Team's newly christened "The Pack" again went to the MSHSL State Championship, and made it to the Final Tournament in Jazz/Funk. It placed 6th in this tournament.

2003–2004

The Andover Dance Team won the Section tournament, the first Section win for the school, and proceeded to the MSHSL State Championship for both Jazz/Funk and High Kick/Precision. The team advanced for the first time to the State Finals in Jazz/Funk and took home the 2nd place medal. In High Kick/Precision, the team was awarded 9th place.

2002–2003

The Andover Dance Team became the first Andover High School sports team to advance to the MSHSL State Championship; the team took both its Jazz/Funk and High Kick/Precision dances to the competition.

== Notable alumni ==
- Claire Butorac - Professional ice hockey player for the PWHL Minnesota
- Luke Dehnicke - college football tight end for the Northwestern Wildcats
- Wyatt Kaiser - Professional ice hockey player for the Chicago Blackhawks
- Maddie Rooney (ice hockey) - Olympic ice hockey player
