= Claire Butorac =

American ice hockey player (born 1999)

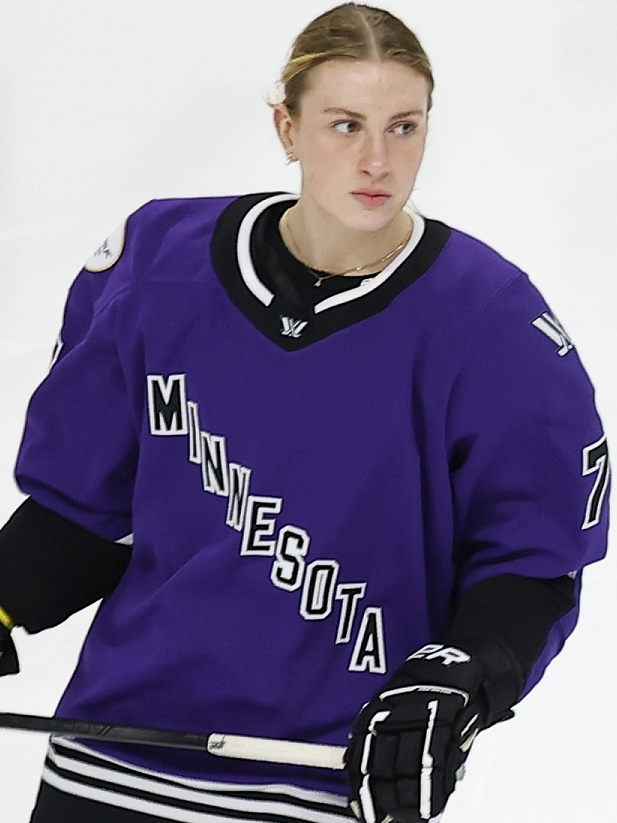
- Butorac with PWHL Minnesota in 2024
- Born: September 24, 1999 (age 27) Andover, Minnesota, U.S.
- Height: 5 ft 5 in (165 cm)
- Position: Forward
- Shoots: Right
- PWHL team: Minnesota Frost
- Playing career: 2018–present

Claire Butorac (born September 24, 1999) is an American professional ice hockey player who is a forward for the Minnesota Frost of the Professional Women's Hockey League (PWHL). She played college ice hockey at Minnesota State.

== Early life ==
Butorac played soccer while growing up. She attended Andover High School in Andover, Minnesota where she was a four-time letter winner in ice hockey and three-time letter winner in lacrosse. She was named a Minnesota Ms. Hockey Award semifinalist in 2018.

== Playing career ==
=== College ===
Butroac began her collegiate career for Minnesota State during the 2018–19 season. During her freshman year, she appeared in all 35 games and recorded two goals and three assists. During the 2019–20 season in her sophomore year, she appeared in all 37 games and recorded eight goals and four assists. She led the team with a 17.4 shot percentage and tied for the team lead with eight goals. During 2020–21 season in her junior year, she appeared in all 20 games and recorded one goal and four assists in a season that was shortened due to the COVID-19 pandemic. During 2021–22 season in her senior year, she recorded three goals and eight assists in 25 games. During 2022–23 season in her graduate year, she recorded seven goals and 16 assists in 36 games.

=== Professional ===
On May 14, 2023, Butroac signed a two-year contract with the Minnesota Whitecaps of the Premier Hockey Federation (PHF). The PHF ceased operations on June 29, 2023, as a result she never played a game for the Whitecaps.

On November 30, 2023, Butorac signed a one-year contract with PWHL Minnesota. During the 2023–24 season, she recorded one goal and two assists in 21 regular season games. Due to an injury to Taylor Heise, Butorac played on the first line along with Kendall Coyne Schofield and Kelly Pannek in February 2024. During the Walter Cup playoffs she recorded one goal and two assists in ten games and helped Minnesota win the inaugural Walter Cup. During game four of the semifinals against PWHL Toronto, she scored the game-winning goal in double-overtime to force a decisive game five. During the 2024–25 season, she recorded two goals, and four assists in 29 games and helped the Frost win their second consecutive Walter Cup. On June 22, 2025, she signed a one-year contract extension with the Frost. During the 2025–26 season, she recorded three assists in 30 games. On June 20, 2026, she signed a one-year contract extension with the Frost.

== Career statistics ==
Note: GP = Games played; G = Goals; A = Assists; Pts = Points; PIM = Penalty minutes;

			Regular season					Playoffs
Season	Team	League	GP	G	A	Pts	PIM	GP	G	A	Pts	PIM
2018–19	Minnesota State University	WCHA	35	2	3	5	2	—	—	—	—	—
2019–20	Minnesota State University	WCHA	37	8	4	12	12	—	—	—	—	—
2020–21	Minnesota State University	WCHA	20	1	4	5	10	—	—	—	—	—
2021–22	Minnesota State University	WCHA	25	3	8	11	0	—	—	—	—	—
2022–23	Minnesota State University	WCHA	36	7	16	23	8	—	—	—	—	—
2023–24	PWHL Minnesota	PWHL	21	1	2	3	2	10	1	2	3	2
2024–25	Minnesota Frost	PWHL	29	2	4	6	8	6	0	0	0	0
2025–26	Minnesota Frost	PWHL	30	0	3	3	6	5	0	0	0	0
PWHL totals			80	3	9	12	16	21	1	2	3	2

== Awards and honors ==
Honors	Year
PWHL
Walter Cup Champion	2024, 2025
