= Legacy Christian Academy (Minnesota) =

Location
- 3037 Bunker Lake Blvd. NW; Andover, Minnesota; 55304; United States of America; 45°13′15″N 093°20′36″W

Information
- Type: Private, Coeducational
- Denomination: Christian
- Established: 1976
- School district: Association of Christian Schools International
- President: Jake Mulvihill (Head of School)
- Principal: Joel Nydam (Pre-K –4th)
- Principal: Libby Manion (5th – 8th)
- Principal: Robert Lynn Atkinson (9th-12th)
- Grades: Pre-School – 12th
- Enrollment: 830
- Colors: Navy Blue, Orange, and White
- Athletics conference: Minnesota Christian Athletic Association
- Mascot: Lions
- Affiliation: Association of Christian Schools International
- Information: +1-763-427-4595
- Fax: +1-763-427-3398
- Website: https://www.lcamn.org/
- Last updated: 7/27/23

Legacy Christian Academy (formerly known as Meadow Creek Christian School) is a private Christian school located in Andover, Minnesota. It has approximately 830 students in pre-school through 12th grade.

Academically, Legacy is accredited by the Association of Christian Schools International. Athletically, it is a 'single A' school which competes as part of the Minnesota State High School League in the Minnesota Christian Athletic Association conference. Their school mascot is a Lion named Pounce, and they have a second lion, who is shorter, with bright orange fur named Pounce Jr. In 2026, an English teacher, American Sign Language teacher, and theater director named Jesse Wagner was awarded with being named on Fox nine teachers of the year.
