= Anoka High School =

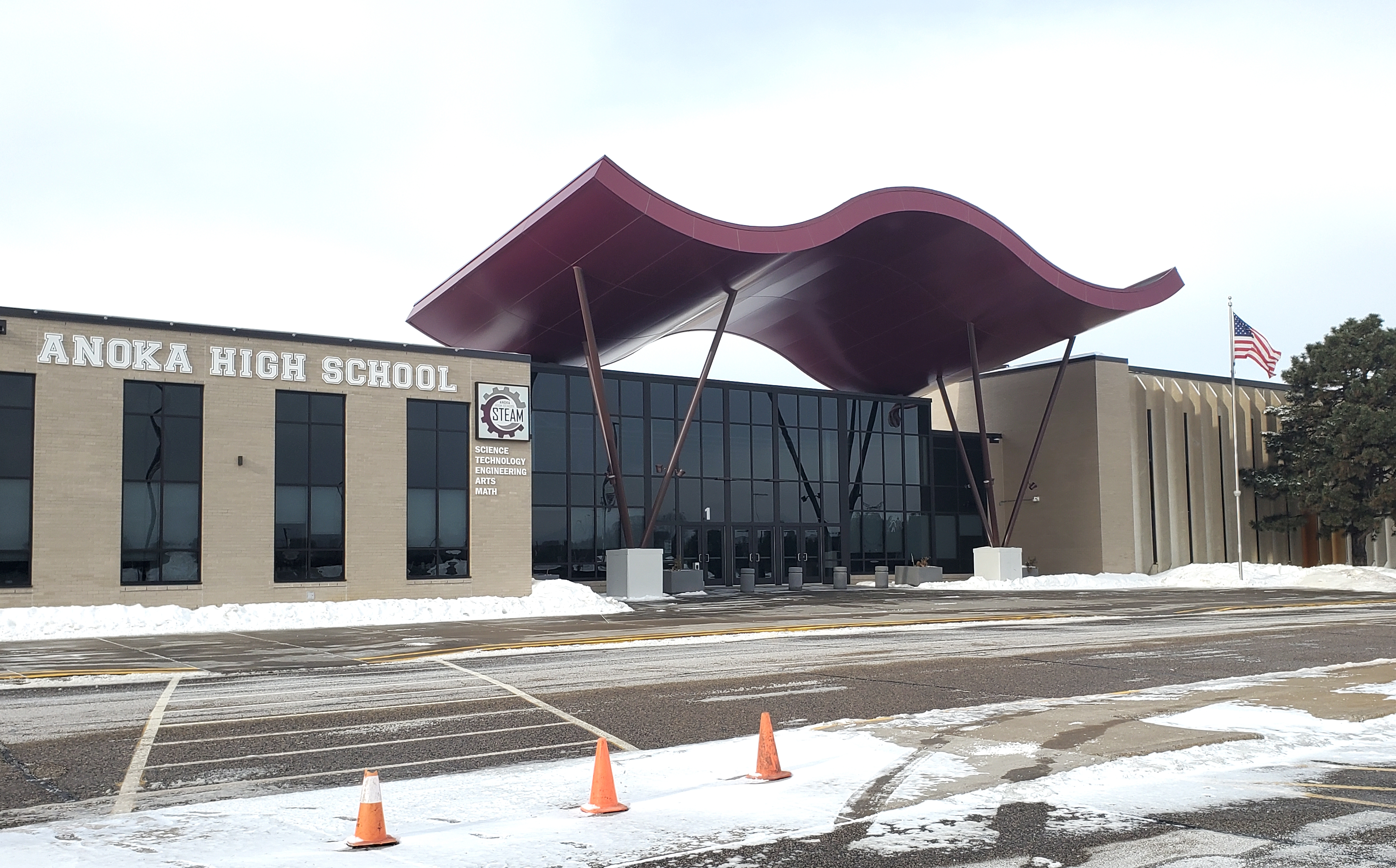

Location
- 3939 Seventh Avenue North; Anoka, Minnesota 55303; United States; 45°13′27″N 93°23′01″W

Information
- Type: Public
- Established: 1880
- School district: Anoka-Hennepin School District 11
- Principal: Mike Farley
- Teaching staff: 123.58 (FTE)
- Grades: 9–12
- Enrollment: 2,353 (2023–2024)
- Student to teacher ratio: 19.04
- Colors: Maroon & White
- Athletics conference: Northwest Suburban Conference
- Nickname: Tornadoes
- Website: School website

Anoka High School is a four-year public high school located in Anoka, Minnesota, United States. It serves grades 9–12 for the Anoka-Hennepin School District 11.

== History ==
The first Anoka High School opened in 1904. Classes initially took place at the Commercial Hotel until the building was completed in January 1905. Construction cost $30,000, and the school could accommodate 200 students. Enrollment at the time was 183.

By 1913, temporary structures were added to address overcrowding, as enrollment continued to grow. By 1925, the school served 425 students, though there was no cafeteria, so students either brought lunch or went home.

In 1929, voters approved replacing the temporary structures with a new wing, which opened in 1930 alongside renovations to the original building. The addition included a gymnasium and auditorium.

In 1939, a second addition was built, adding classrooms and offices, and the older sections underwent repairs. Enrollment reached 699 students that year. In June of 1939, a tornado struck much of Main Street in Anoka but narrowly missed the school. A reporter dubbed one of the school teams the “Tornadoes,” a nickname that eventually became the school mascot.

The second Anoka High School opened in 1955, a few blocks southeast of downtown Anoka, on a 12-acre site donated by Dr. George and Pearl Ghostley. The original high school building became Sandburg Middle School. Designed for 1,000 students, the new school opened with an enrollment of 848. A major addition in 1959 expanded capacity to 1,800 students. Despite the opening of Coon Rapids High School in 1963, enrollment at Anoka High continued to rise, reaching 2,082 students by 1971.

In 1970, construction began on the current Anoka High School building, which opened in 1972 at its present location on 7th Avenue. The previous high school building became Fred Moore Junior High School (later Fred Moore Middle School, and now Anoka Middle School for the Arts). Anoka High School is one of the oldest and largest high schools in Minnesota.

From the formation of the Anoka-Hennepin School District 11 in 1920 until the opening of Coon Rapids High School in 1963, all district students attended high school in Anoka.

== Athletics ==
Anoka competes in the Northwest Suburban Conference in the Minnesota State High School League. The school mascot is the Tornadoes.

State Championships
Sport	Number of Championships	Years
Soccer, Girls	1	1989
Soccer, Boys	3	2007, 2014, 2015
Football	5	1915, 1944, 1964, 1990, 1994
Wrestling	6	1949, 1950, 1955, 1961, 1977, 1978
Hockey, Boys	1	2003
Basketball, Boys	3	1973, 1981, 1992
Track and field, Girls	3	1981, 1982, 2000
Baseball	1	1945
Golf, Boys	2	1950, 1951
Adapted Soccer, coed	6	(PI) 2007, 2015, 2016, (CI) 1993, 2010, 2011
Adapted Hockey, coed	7	(PI) 2007, 2008, 2010, (CI) 1996, 2010, 2011, 2012
Adapted Softball, coed	5	(PI) 2015, (CI) 1997, 2010, 2011, 2012
Total		43

== Notable alumni ==
- Michele Bachmann - Former Member of the U.S. House of Representatives
- Jen Boyles - Writer, editor and digital media CEO
- Gretchen Carlson - Fox News anchor and Miss America
- Margaret Chutich - Minnesota Supreme Court judge
- Jake Deitchler - Olympic wrestler
- Bobby Fenwick - Major League Baseball infielder
- Anna Arnold Hedgeman - African-American civil rights leader, politician, educator, and writer
- Koryne Horbal - Former chairwoman of the Minnesota Democratic Farmer Labor Party and American Representative to multiple councils at the United Nations
- Garrison Keillor - author, host of the radio program "A Prairie Home Companion"
- Cody Lindenberg - College football linebacker for the Minnesota Golden Gophers
- Ben Nelson - Wide Receiver
- Steve Nelson - NFL Linebacker
- Mark Nenow - Distance runner
- Brandon Paulson - Olympic wrestler
- Briana Scurry - Soccer Goalie
- Abigail Whelan - Member of the Minnesota House of Representatives
