= Andover, Minnesota =

City in Minnesota, United States

Andover
- City
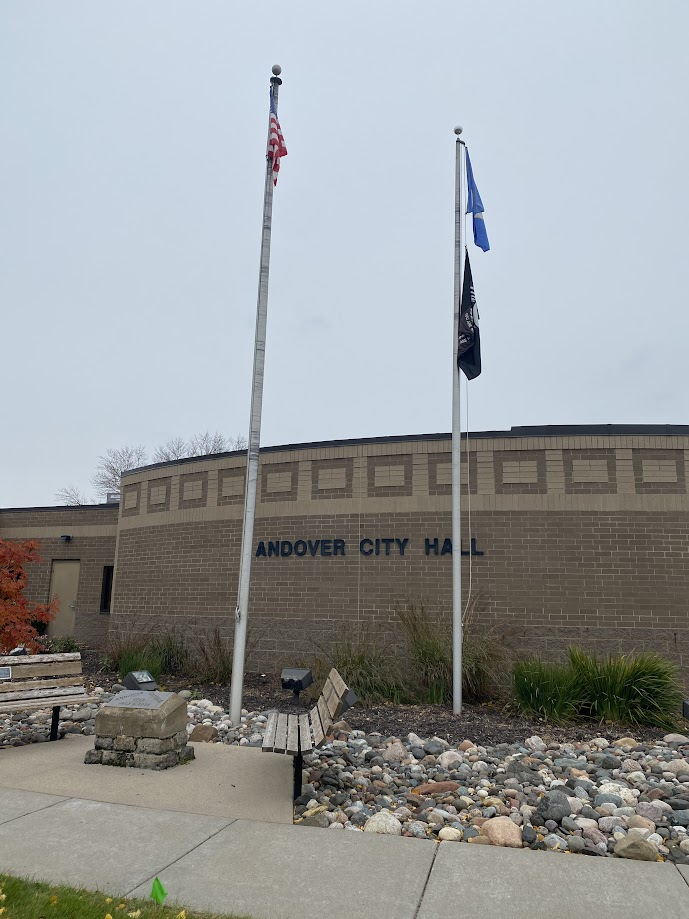
- Andover City Hall, October 2023
- Interactive map of Andover
- Coordinates: 45°14′00″N 93°17′29″W
- Country: United States
- State: Minnesota
- County: Anoka
- Founded: 1857
- Incorporated (village): 1972
- Incorporated (city): November 12, 1972

Government
  - Mayor: Jamie Barthel

Area
  - City: 34.83 sq mi (90.21 km^{2})
  - Land: 33.87 sq mi (87.73 km^{2})
  - Water: 0.96 sq mi (2.48 km^{2}) 2.72%
- Elevation: 876 ft (267 m)

Population (2020)
  - City: 32,601
  - Estimate (2022): 32,928
  - Density: 962.5/sq mi (371.62/km^{2})
  - Metro: 3,693,729
- Time zone: UTC-6 (Central)
  - Summer (DST): UTC-5 (CDT)
- ZIP code: 55304
- Area code: 763
- FIPS code: 27-01486
- GNIS feature ID: 2393954
- Website: andovermn.gov

Andover is a city in Anoka County, Minnesota, United States. The population was 32,601 at the 2020 census.

== Geography ==
According to the United States Census Bureau, the city has a total area of 34.83 square miles (90.21 km^{2}), of which 33.88 square miles (87.75 km^{2}) is land and 0.95 square miles (2.46 km^{2}) is water. County Roads 9, 18, 78, and 116 are the main routes in the community. U.S. Highway 10 is nearby.

Crooked Lake is the only fully recreational lake in Andover. It is on the southern border of the city with the majority of the lake in neighboring Coon Rapids.

== History ==
Andover first organized in 1857 as Round Lake Township.

In 1860 after an Anoka, Minnesota speech by U.S. Representative Galusha Aaron Grow from Pennsylvania who was an abolitionist and a major figure in the Homestead Act, the town name was changed to Grow Township.

Ham Lake Township split from Andover, known as Grow Township at the time, in 1871.

Once a stop on the Great Northern Railway, Andover was established as a city in 1976.

A popular myth surrounding the origins of the name "Andover" describe a train tipping off the railroad tracks, and an eyewitness describing that the train "went over and over", however this proves to be false because an Anoka County Union Newspaper article first mentions the name in an articled dated March 14, 1899, before any railroad tracks went through the city. The article described the Great Northern Railway announcing the names of new stations being located throughout the area, including a station named "Andover Station". The origin of the name for the station is probably the town of Andover in the UK .

== Demographics ==
Historical population
Census	Pop.	Note	%±
1860	330		—
1870	396		20.0%
1880	419		5.8%
1890	485		15.8%
1900	721		48.7%
1910	614		−14.8%
1920	626		2.0%
1930	508		−18.8%
1940	656		29.1%
1950	757		15.4%
1960	1,402		85.2%
1970	3,830		173.2%
1980	9,387		145.1%
1990	15,216		62.1%
2000	26,588		74.7%
2010	30,598		15.1%
2020	32,601		6.5%
2022 (est.)	32,928		1.0%
U.S. Decennial Census; 2020 Census

=== 2020 census ===
As of the 2020 census, Andover had a population of 32,601. The median age was 39.8 years. 25.8% of residents were under the age of 18 and 12.9% of residents were 65 years of age or older. For every 100 females there were 101.1 males, and for every 100 females age 18 and over there were 100.3 males age 18 and over.

77.1% of residents lived in urban areas, while 22.9% lived in rural areas.

There were 10,782 households in Andover, of which 39.4% had children under the age of 18 living in them. Of all households, 71.6% were married-couple households, 10.2% were households with a male householder and no spouse or partner present, and 12.9% were households with a female householder and no spouse or partner present. About 13.1% of all households were made up of individuals and 6.7% had someone living alone who was 65 years of age or older.

There were 11,005 housing units, of which 2.0% were vacant. The homeowner vacancy rate was 0.7% and the rental vacancy rate was 4.5%.

Racial composition as of the 2020 census
Race	Number	Percent
White	28,425	87.2%
Black or African American	989	3.0%
American Indian and Alaska Native	102	0.3%
Asian	995	3.1%
Native Hawaiian and Other Pacific Islander	2	0.0%
Some other race	309	0.9%
Two or more races	1,779	5.5%
Hispanic or Latino (of any race)	893	2.7%

=== 2010 census ===
As of the census of 2010, there were 30,598 people, 9,811 households, and 8,357 families living in the city. The population density was 903.1 inhabitants per square mile (348.7/km^{2}). There were 10,091 housing units at an average density of 297.8 per square mile (115.0/km^{2}). The racial makeup of the city was 93.2% White, 1.7% African American, 0.3% Native American, 2.2% Asian, 0.6% from other races, and 1.9% from two or more races. Hispanic or Latino of any race were 2.0%.

Of the 9,811 households 47.6% had children under the age of 18 living with them, 74.2% were married couples living together, 7.1% had a female householder with no husband present, 3.9% had a male householder with no wife present, and 14.8% were non-families. 10.6% of households were one person and 3.4% were one person aged 65 or older. The average household size was 3.11 and the average family size was 3.35.

The median age was 37.3 years. 30.4% of residents were under the age of 18; 7.6% were between the ages of 18 and 24; 25.5% were from 25 to 44; 29.9% were from 45 to 64; and 6.7% were 65 or older. The gender makeup of the city was 50.7% male and 49.3% female.

=== 2000 census ===
As of the census of 2000, there were 26,588 people, 8,107 households, and 7,150 families living in the city. The population density was 779.6 inhabitants per square mile (301.0/km^{2}). There were 8,205 housing units at an average density of 240.6 per square mile (92.9/km^{2}). The racial makeup of the city was 96.48% White, 0.54% African American, 0.35% Native American, 1.08% Asian, 0.02% Pacific Islander, 0.32% from other races, and 1.21% from two or more races. Hispanic or Latino of any race were 1.05% of the population.

Of the 8,107 households 55.1% had children under the age of 18 living with them, 80.0% were married couples living together, 5.5% had a female householder with no husband present, and 11.8% were non-families. 8.4% of households were one person and 2.3% were one person aged 65 or older. The average household size was 3.28 and the average family size was 3.48.

The age distribution was 35.5% under the age of 18, 6.0% from 18 to 24, 36.4% from 25 to 44, 19.2% from 45 to 64, and 2.9% 65 or older. The median age was 32 years. For every 100 females, there were 103.4 males. For every 100 females age 18 and over, there were 102.5 males.

The median household income was $76,241 and the median family income was $78,785. Males had a median income of $50,248 versus $33,814 for females. The per capita income for the city was $26,317. About 1.2% of families and 2.0% of the population were below the poverty line, including 2.0% of those under age 18 and 4.0% of those age 65 or over.

== Government ==
United States presidential election results for Andover, Minnesota
Year	Republican		Democratic		Third party(ies)	
Year	No.	%	No.	%	No.	%
2000	7,575	55.93%	5,270	38.91%	698	5.15%
2004	10,203	62.06%	6,076	36.96%	162	0.99%
2008	10,338	58.75%	6,969	39.60%	291	1.65%
2012	10,848	59.33%	7,086	38.75%	351	1.92%
2016	10,587	57.55%	6,195	33.68%	1,613	8.77%
2020	11,841	56.85%	8,488	40.75%	499	2.40%

The Andover City Council consists of four at-large council members, each elected to four-year terms, while the mayor is elected to two-year terms. At each citywide election, two council members and the mayor are up for election, with council member elections staggered so that only two members are elected at a time. Elections are held every even year concurrently with state and federal general elections.

As of the 2024 election, Andover is represented in the State House by districts 31A (Harry Niska, Republican), 31B (Peggy Scott, Republican), and 35B (Kari Rehrauer, Democrat); and in the State Senate by districts 31 (Calvin Bahr, Republican), and 35 (Jim Abeler, Republican).

Andover is located in Minnesota's 6th congressional district, represented by Republican Tom Emmer.

=== Mayor & Current Local Government ===
As of the 2024 election, the current members of the Andover City Council are:

- Mayor: Jamie Barthel (Term expires January 2027)
- Council member: Rick Engelhardt (Term expires January 2027)
- Council member: Scott Schue (Term expires January 2029)
- Council member: Jonathan Shafto (Term expires January 2029)
- Council member: Karen Godfrey (Term expires January 2027)

== City Celebration ==
The annual city celebration is the Andover Family Fun Bash, held near the beginning of July on and around the grounds of City Hall, Andover Elementary School, and Sunshine Park. Events include a 5K fun run, a street dance, a parade, and a fireworks show.

The 25th Annual Andover Family Fun Fest was held on July 9 and 10, 2021.

== Education ==
Andover is part of Minnesota's Anoka-Hennepin School District 11. District 11 schools within Andover's boundaries include Andover Elementary School, Crooked Lake Elementary School, Rum River Elementary School, Oak View Middle School, and Andover High School. In addition, a small strip of the northern part of the city is part of St. Francis Area Schools (Independent School District 15). Legacy Christian Academy is a K-12 college preparatory school.

== Notable people ==
- Mike Morin (born 1991), Major League Baseball pitcher
- Maddie Rooney (born 1997), Olympic ice hockey goaltender and player for the Minnesota Frost
- Claire Butorac (born 1999), Professional ice hockey player for the Minnesota Frost
- Peyton Hemp (born 2003), Professional ice hockey player for the Ottawa Charge
