= Anoka County History Center =

Museum in Anoka, Minnesota

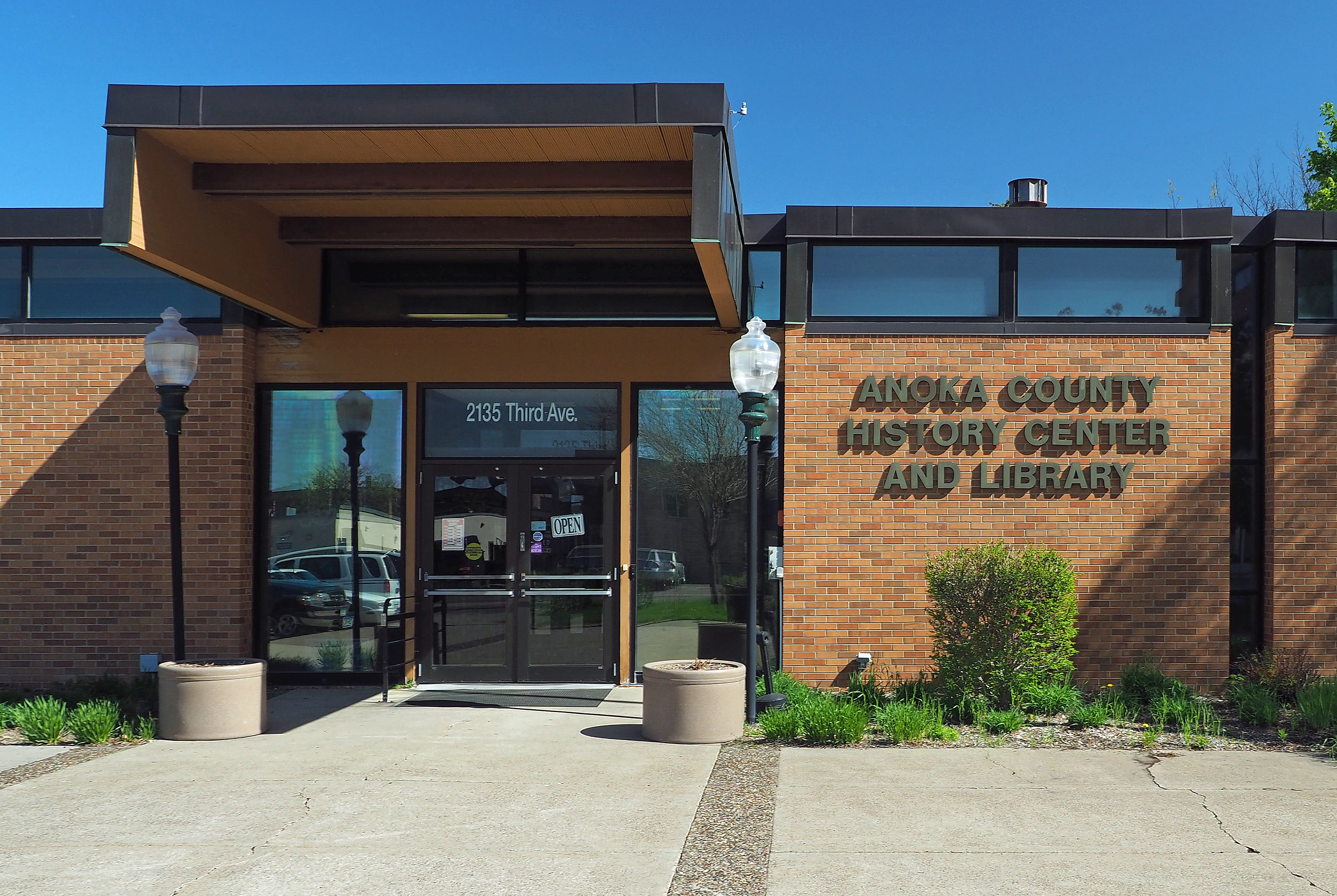
- Entrance
- Established: 1934
- Location: 2135 Third Ave N, Anoka, Minnesota 55303, United States
- Coordinates: 45.19969°N 93.38770°W
- Type: Local history
- Executive director: Rebecca Ebnet-Desens
- Website: anokacountyhistory.org

The Anoka County History Center was a 8,000-square-foot museum gallery, research library, and archival facility in the former Anoka library building in downtown Anoka. Owned by the city of Anoka and operated by the Anoka County Historical Society it showcased the history of Anoka County, Minnesota. Previously located in Colonial Hall they moved to the current location, the old city library building in the city of Anoka 20 years ago.

The organization was displaced by pending redevelopment after the city of Anoka advanced a proposed $60 million mixed-use redevelopment project for the Anoka County History Center site. In 2026, the society purchased the Heman L. Ticknor House, an 1867 property listed on the National Register of Historic Places that also operated as the Ticknor Hill Bed and Breakfast. The society moved its offices and research library to Ticknor House while continuing to operate the bed and breakfast; its artifact collection is not planned for the site. A permanent repository for the artifact collection has not yet been established.

== Anoka County Historical Society ==
Established in 1934, the society has been preserving the history of Anoka County. The current executive director is Rebecca Ebnet-Mavencamp who started in 2015.

=== Collections ===
The oral history collection includes more than 250 interviews on a variety of topics from WWII, the Korean War and the Vietnam War, including memories of Anoka County residents. There is also a collection of unpublished books and articles featuring Anoka County Civil War soldiers, the history of Fridley, annotated history of Circle Pines and Lexington, early records of St. Genevieve's Church, cemetery indexes and maps and the history of the Rum River. Samples from the collection range from a kayak that set a world record to furniture and clothing from as far back as the 1860s; a Works Progress Administration sidewalk section; probate records; the entire print collection of the Circulating Pines newspapers; Ho Chi Minh sandals from a Vietnam veteran; a watch fob made from a piece of a little girl's skull; and a silver service given as a wedding gift in 1887.

In 2008, the Anoka County Historical Society had to undergo a "de-accession" process, or letting go of objects. "We took the opportunity to educate our members about what we want and don't," former executive director, Todd Mahon said.

=== Programs ===
The Society also conduct educational programming, tours, and special events throughout the year. Through its "Museum in a Box" program, the Society helps Anoka County teachers teach the local history of the county to students. Boxes contain several hands-on artifacts from their collections relating to a particular topic, providing children direct experience with the past. Information cards about each artifact help students understand why the objects are important.

== See also ==
- List of museums in Minnesota
