= National Register of Historic Places listings in Anoka County, Minnesota =

Location of Anoka County in Minnesota

This is a list of the National Register of Historic Places listings in Anoka County, Minnesota. It is intended to be a complete list of the properties and districts on the National Register of Historic Places in Anoka County, Minnesota, United States. The locations of National Register properties and districts for which the latitude and longitude coordinates are included below, may be seen in an online map.

There are 18 properties and districts listed on the National Register in the county. A supplementary list includes one additional site that was formerly listed on the National Register.

This National Park Service list is complete through NPS recent listings posted April 24, 2026.

== Current listings ==
	Name on the Register	Image	Date listed	Location	City or town	Description
1	Anoka Post Office	Anoka Post Office	December 31, 1979 (#79001180)	300 E. Main St. 45°11′52″N 93°23′13″W	Anoka	1916 Georgian Revival post office, Anoka's oldest surviving public building and most architecturally significant non-residential property.
2	Anoka-Champlin Mississippi River Bridge	Anoka-Champlin Mississippi River Bridge	December 31, 1979 (#79001181)	U.S. Route 169 over Mississippi River; 45°11′31″N 93°23′43″W	Anoka	1929 example of the open-spandrel concrete arch bridges developed in the Twin Cities area in the late 1920s; also noted for providing a key connection between two river communities. Extends into Hennepin County.
3	Banfill Tavern	Banfill Tavern	December 12, 1976 (#76001044)	6666 E. River Rd. 45°05′21″N 93°16′37″W	Fridley	One of Anoka County's earliest and best-preserved frame Greek Revival houses, built in 1847.
4	Carlos Avery Game Farm	Carlos Avery Game Farm	August 9, 1991 (#91000977)	5463 W. Broadway; 45°17′18″N 93°07′46″W	Columbus	One of the nation's foremost game farms upon its establishment, and one of Minnesota's first large wildlife management projects, with 14 contributing properties built 1936–38. Also noted for its unusual use of Colonial Revival architecture.
5	Colonial Hall and Masonic Lodge No. 30	Colonial Hall and Masonic Lodge No. 30	December 31, 1979 (#79001182)	1900 3rd Ave. S. 45°11′49″N 93°23′12″W	Anoka	1904 house/office of doctor couple Alanson and Flora Aldrich, local medical and civic leaders; expanded after their deaths with a 1922 Masonic Temple. Also noted as Anoka's best-preserved example of a Georgian Revival house designed by Frederick Marsh.
6	Crescent Grange Hall No. 512	Crescent Grange Hall No. 512	December 26, 1979 (#79001190)	Typo Lake Rd. 45°23′04″N 93°06′00″W	Martin Lake	Early Minnesota example of a Grange hall, built 1881–82.
7	District No. 28 School	District No. 28 School	December 27, 1979 (#79001188)	14100 St. Francis Blvd. NW. 45°13′37″N 93°23′55″W	Ramsey	1892 one-room schoolhouse representing an 1880s–1890s expansion of public buildings across rural Anoka County. Also noted as one of the county's few brick buildings. Later used as Ramsey Town Hall.
8	Jackson Hotel	Jackson Hotel	December 8, 1978 (#78001525)	214 Jackson St. 45°11′55″N 93°23′19″W	Anoka	Prominent hotel in operation 1884–1975, a reminder of Anoka's reconstruction following a major 1884 fire and of its role as a trade center.
9	Porter Kelsey House	Porter Kelsey House	December 26, 1979 (#79001186)	14853 N. 7th Ave. 45°14′27″N 93°22′37″W	Andover	Brick company owner's 1887 house, noted for its association with Anoka County's brickmaking industry and as a well-preserved 19th-century rural residence with Italianate architecture elements.
10	Kline Sanatarium	Kline Sanatarium	December 26, 1979 (#79001187)	1500 S. Ferry St. 45°11′35″N 93°23′36″W	Anoka	Anoka's first hospital, in operation 1902–1935, and prominent symbol of the city's early reputation for a healthy environment and top-tier medical care.
11	H. G. Leathers House	H. G. Leathers House	December 26, 1979 (#79001192)	22957 Rum River Blvd. 45°23′10″N 93°21′31″W	St. Francis	Circa-1883 house moved and expanded circa 1890, associated with three generations of an influential local family. Also noted as one of Anoka County's few Victorian houses.
12	Riverside Hotel	Riverside Hotel	December 26, 1979 (#79001193)	3631 Bridge St. 45°23′14″N 93°21′31″W	St. Francis	Only surviving commercial building dating to the settlement of lumber boomtown St. Francis; a house built circa 1860 expanded into lodging for lumber and mill workers. Now the Rum River Inn restaurant.
13	Shaw-Hammons House	Shaw-Hammons House	December 26, 1979 (#79001183)	302 Fremont St. 45°11′52″N 93°23′43″W	Anoka	1852 house expanded in 1870, associated with local settlement through its succession of notable early owners, and Anoka's best-preserved example of Greek Revival architecture.
14	Sparre Barn	Sparre Barn	January 10, 1980 (#80001935)	20071 Nowthen Blvd. 45°20′05″N 93°28′09″W	Nowthen	Well-preserved example, built 1917–1924, of a round barn, of Anoka County's dairy barns, and of local architect Ernest Marsh's barn designs.
15	Swedish Evangelical Lutheran Church	Swedish Evangelical Lutheran Church	December 26, 1979 (#79001189)	2200 Swedish Dr. NE. 45°17′37″N 93°12′44″W	Ham Lake	Well-preserved 1872 church representing the Swedish American heritage of Anoka County's largest immigrant settlement.
16	Heman L. Ticknor House	Heman L. Ticknor House	December 27, 1979 (#79001184)	1625 3rd Ave. S. 45°11′38″N 93°23′18″W	Anoka	House associated with three generations of an influential local family and three architectural styles, juxtaposing an 1867 Gothic Revival core with an elaborate 1901 Queen Anne/Neoclassical remodeling. Now a bed and breakfast.
17	Windego Park Auditorium/Open Air Theater	Windego Park Auditorium/Open Air Theater	January 8, 1980 (#80001934)	Between S. Ferry St. and the Rum River; 45°11′50″N 93°23′36″W	Anoka	Remains of a 1914 open-air theatre unique in Minnesota, a late City Beautiful movement project and a venue for local events up to 1938. A colorful canvas awning system, since removed, was designed by Purcell & Elmslie.
18	Woodbury House	Woodbury House	December 26, 1979 (#79001185)	1632 S. Ferry St. 45°11′42″N 93°23′36″W	Anoka	House reflecting Anoka's first years through its association with town developer Dwight Woodbury and the Federal/Greek Revival architecture of its 1857 original section. Now The Mad Hatter Restaurant & Tea Room.

== Former listing ==
	Name on the Register	Image	Date listed	Date removed	Location	City or town	Description
1	Richardson Barn		December 26, 1979 (#79001191)	August 9, 2016	22814 Sunrise Rd. NE; 45°22′57″N 93°02′49″W	East Bethel	Log barn built c. 1870 for hay storage, representing Anoka County's basic early structures and its leading cash crop from the 1860s to the 1940s. Demolished in the late 1990s.

== See also ==
- List of National Historic Landmarks in Minnesota
- National Register of Historic Places listings in Minnesota
