= Jackson Hotel =

Jackson Hotel may refer to:

- Jackson Hotel (Paola, Kansas), listed on the National Register of Historic Places in Miami County, Kansas
- Jackson Hotel (Anoka, Minnesota), listed on the National Register of Historic Places in Anoka County, Minnesota
