= Shaw–Hammons House =

Historic house in Minnesota, United States

- Shaw-Hammons House
- U.S. National Register of Historic Places
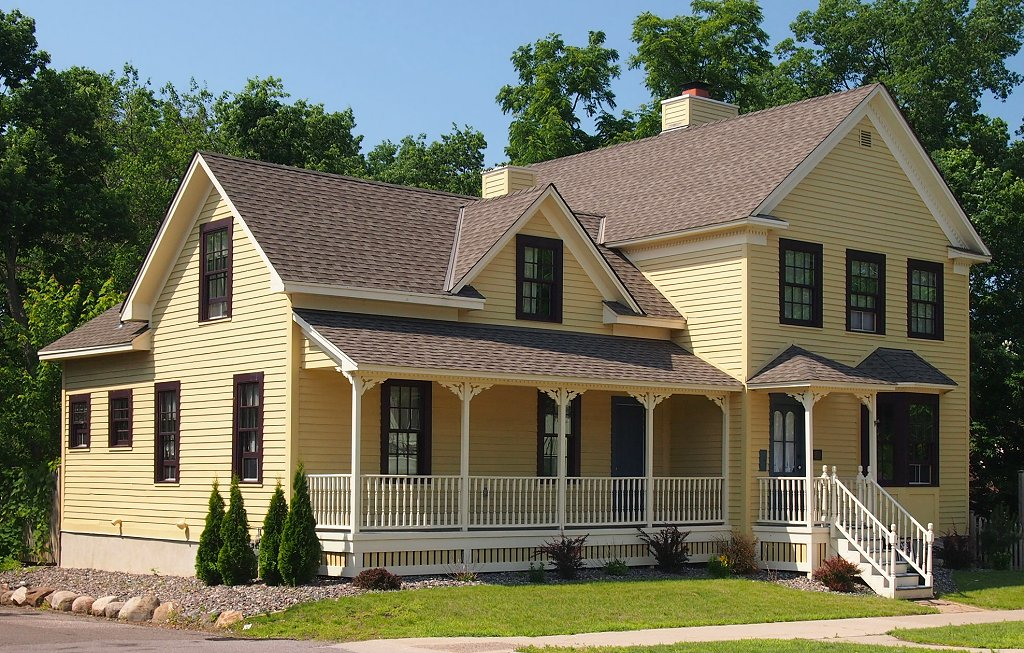
- The Shaw–Hammons House viewed from the northeast

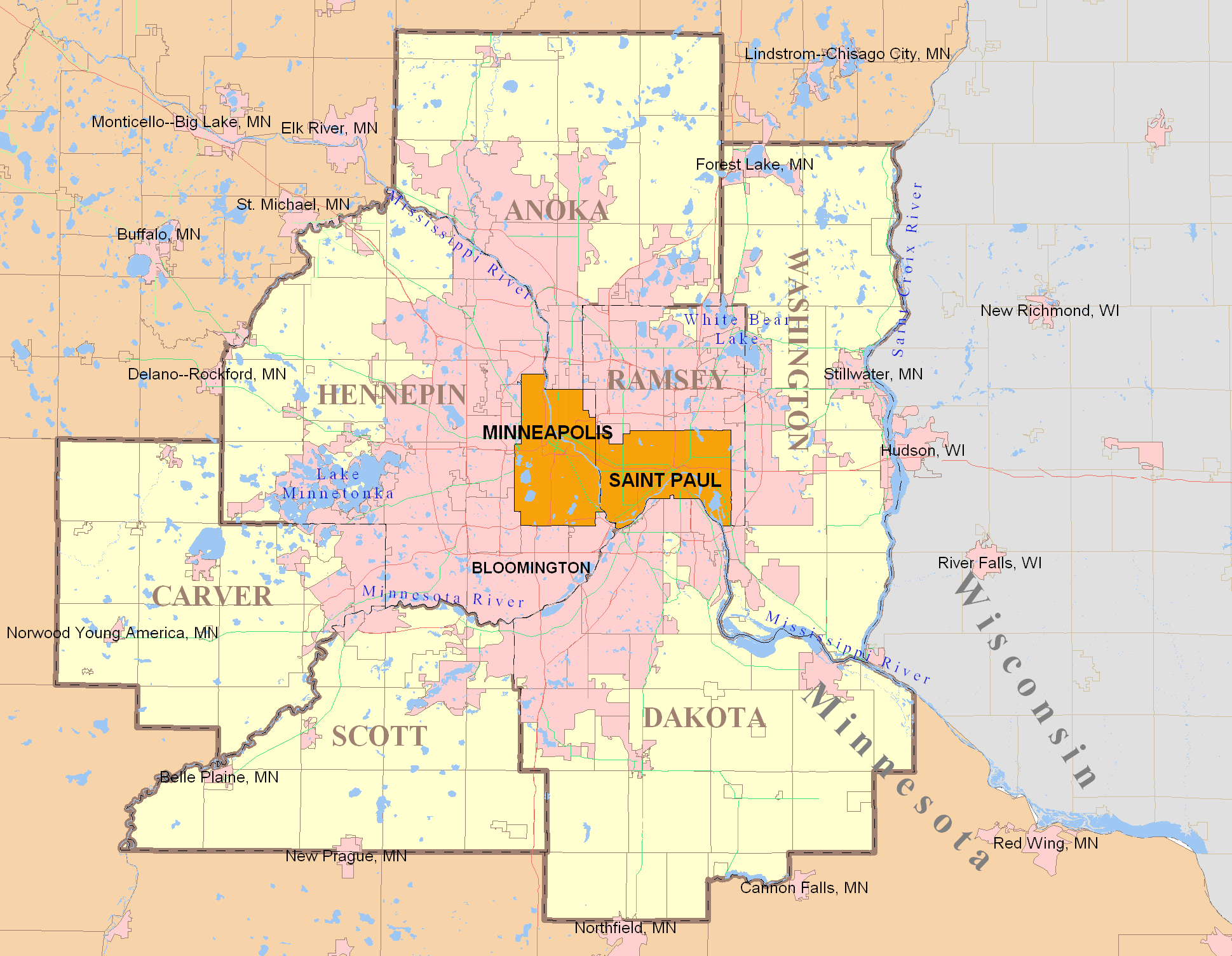
- Location within Minneapolis–Saint Paul Location within Minnesota Location within the United States
- Location: 302 Fremont Street, Anoka, Minnesota
- Coordinates: 45°11′52″N 93°23′43″W
- Area: Less than one acre
- Built: c. 1852, 1870
- Architectural style: Greek Revival
- NRHP reference No.: 79001183
- Designated: December 26, 1979

The Shaw–Hammons House, also known as the DeGraff–Follrath House, is the oldest standing residential building in Anoka, Minnesota, United States. It was originally built around 1852 and then expanded in 1870. The Shaw–Hammons House was listed on the National Register of Historic Places in 1979 for its local significance in the themes of architecture and exploration/settlement. It was nominated for its association with local Euro-American settlement through its succession of notable early owners, and for being Anoka's best-preserved example of Greek Revival architecture.

== Origin ==
In 1854, Neil Shaw purchased and platted 160 acres (65 ha) of land in present-day Anoka County, Minnesota, with his three sons. They built the family home out of simple wood and clapboard siding while using elements of Greek Revival architecture in the formal design. Crowned with a slightly pitched roof, the eaves feature a detailed classical cornice. The eave returns, shuttered front windows, and entrance also embody the symmetry and grace of this style.

Shaw used the east section of his house as one of Anoka's original storefronts from the 1850s into the 1870s. Afterward, ownership of the property changed hands many times. One of Anoka's prominent citizens, a transplanted attorney from Maine named Weston Hammons, purchased the home in 1870. That same year, Hammons added to the west section, creating a two-and-a-half-story structure with a full basement, which came to be considered the main house. Additional modifications involved remodeling the front façade—including the veranda—with turned posts and decorative spandrel. The interior of this section contains two parlors and a closet on the first floor, as well as two bedrooms, two closets, and a bath on the second floor. Hammons later expanded his business interests into the local lumber industry and to Anoka's Boot and Shoe Manufacturing Company, which endured as one of Anoka's most significant enterprises during the 1880s.

== Later history ==
In 1883, Justice W. DeGraff, a railroad contractor and engineer, purchased the house for his wife and daughter. His only child, Marie, soon developed a keen interest in gardening and flowers. When she inherited the home from her parents, she expanded the property's garden. Under her care, the south side of the narrow lot along the house became a prolific producer of brightly colored flowers and plants, many of which Marie bred herself. To supplement her income, Marie gave piano lessons to the local children and was recognized as an accomplished artist.

When Marie moved to a senior care facility in 1965, the house changed hands once again, this time to Darwin Follrath and his wife. The couple restored the home to its original 1870 configuration, and on February 11, 1980, the home received an official listing on the National Register of Historic Places.

After the Follraths sold the home to a development company, it fell into disrepair. The developers considered it too far gone to restore and attempted to demolish it in order to make way for a condominium, though city zoning and preservation ordinances prohibited it. With those plans effectively cancelled and the home listed on the "most endangered" list compiled by the Preservation Alliance of Minnesota, the developers sold the home to a private citizen whose time, money, and efforts eventually revived it to its original 1870 luster.

== See also ==
- National Register of Historic Places listings in Anoka County, Minnesota
