= Anoka Post Office =

- U.S. National Register of Historic Places
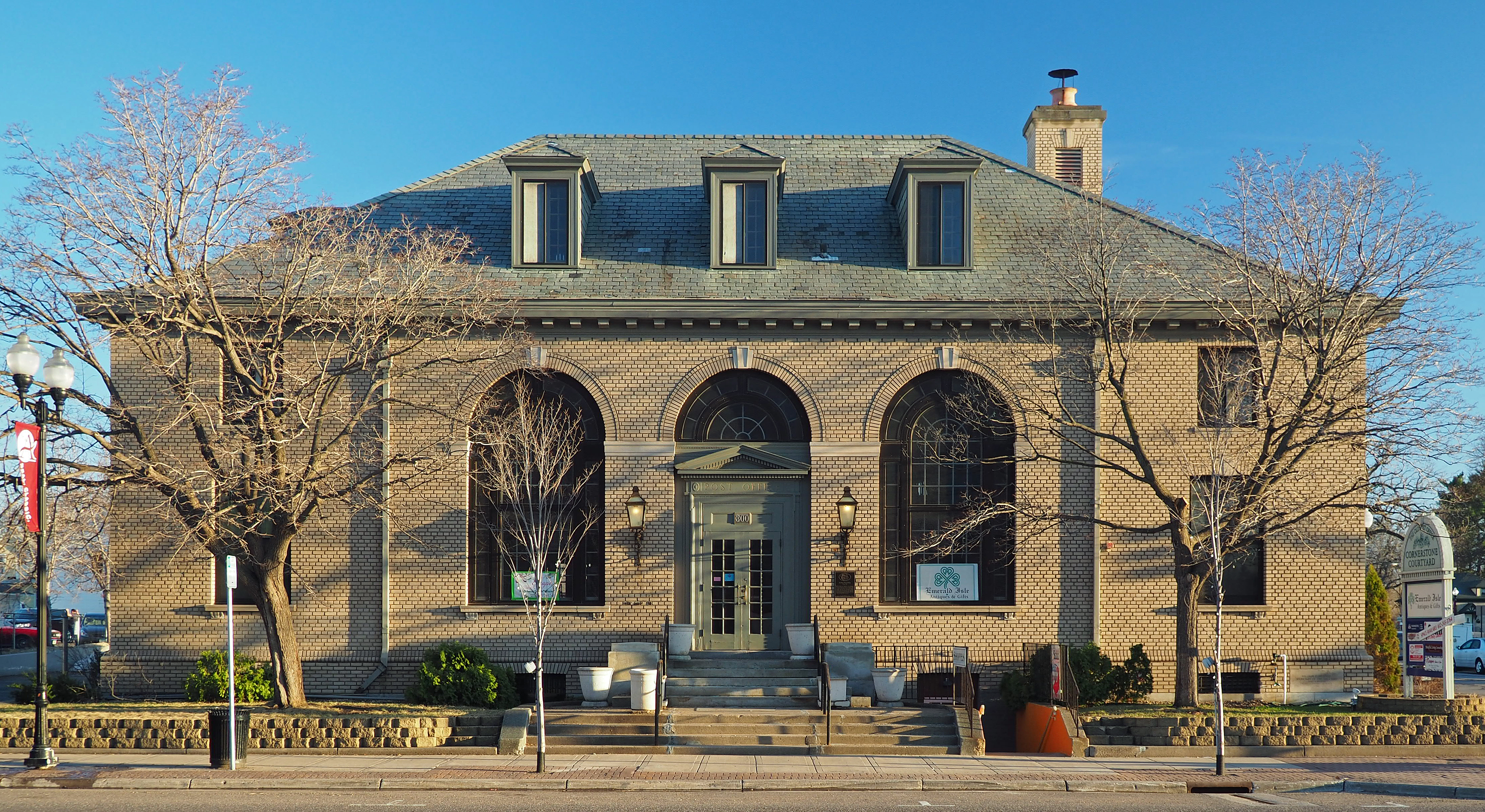
- The Anoka Post Office viewed from the north

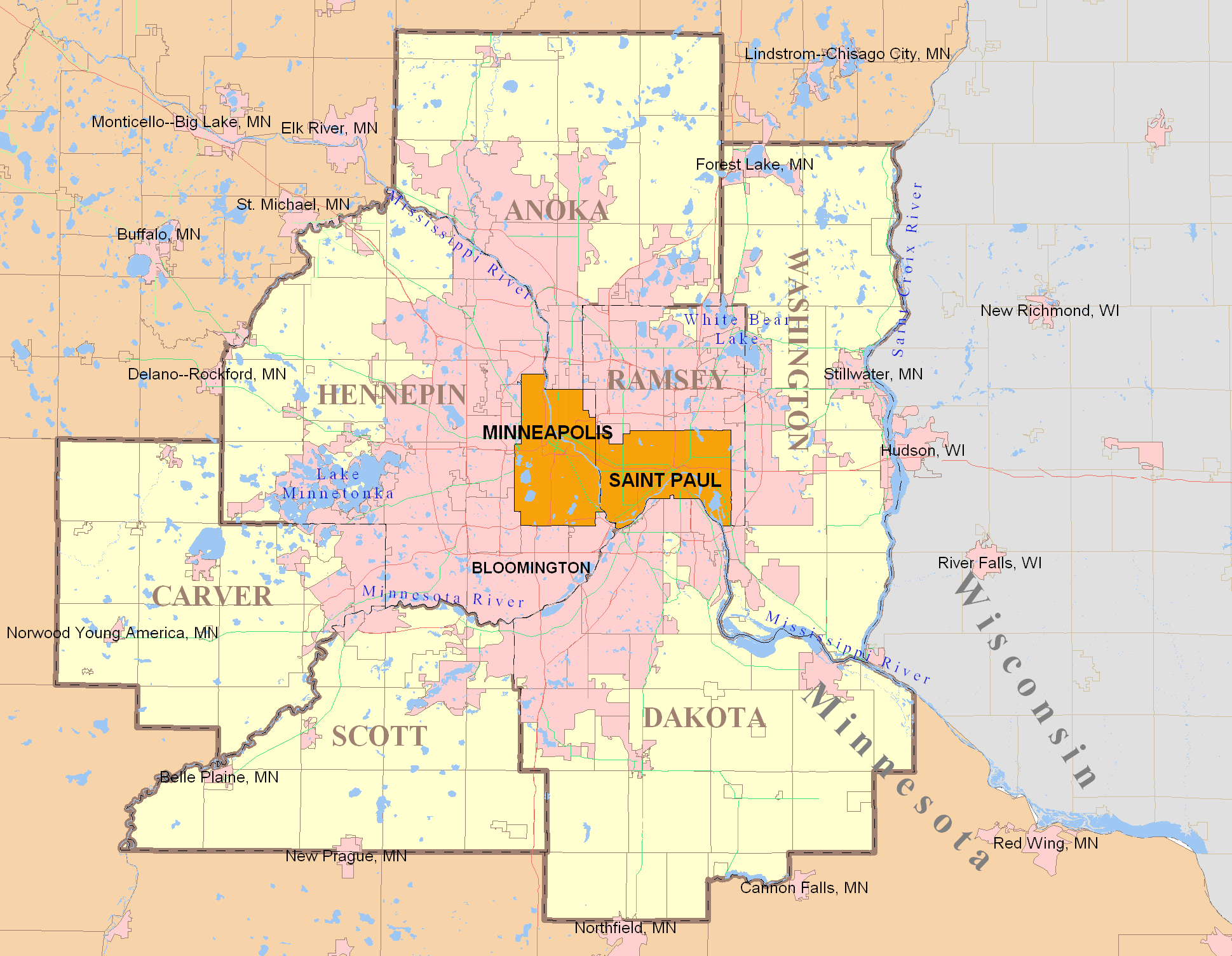
- Location within Minneapolis–Saint Paul Location within Minnesota Location within the United States
- Interactive map of Anoka Post Office
- Location: 300 E. Main Street, Anoka, Minnesota
- Coordinates: 45°11′51.5″N 93°23′13″W
- Area: Less than one acre
- Built: 1916
- Architect: James Knox Taylor
- Architectural style: Colonial Revival
- NRHP reference No.: 79001180
- Added to NRHP: December 31, 1979

The Anoka Post Office is a former post office building in Anoka, Minnesota, United States. It was built in 1916 in a Colonial Revival design credited to architect James Knox Taylor. It remained in service as a U.S. Post Office until 1977, after which it has housed a variety of commercial tenants. The building was listed on the National Register of Historic Places in 1979 for its local significance in the theme of architecture. It was nominated for its status as Anoka's oldest surviving public building and most architecturally significant non-residential property.

== Description ==
The Anoka Post Office exhibits features of Colonial Revival architecture such as its rectangular plan, a brick exterior, symmetrical façades, a hip roof, and a dentillated cornice. The doorway has a central pediment and is set in the middle of three arched openings topped with keystones. Another key element of the style is the fanlight over the main entrance.

== History ==
In the early 20th century, Anoka's former postmaster Irving Caswell served as editor of the Anoka Herald newspaper and James Knox Taylor had recently returned to private practice after serving as head of the Office of the Supervising Architect for the U.S. Treasury. In 1911 Casswell encouraged Taylor to launch a series of newspaper articles lobbying for the construction of a post office in Anoka. Taylor prevailed, and construction of the post office began in 1916. During its service as Anoka's post office, the building reflected the steady growth of the community. By 1925, the number of addresses receiving deliveries inside the city surpassed 600. Consequently, the postal service added a second mail carrier to the staff and divided the delivery into two routes. They measured growth by the number of transactions logged.

In 1933 the Anoka Post Office handled $23,193.80 in receipts (equivalent to $576,864 in 2025). Five years later that number increased to $60,000 (equivalent to $1,370,000 in 2025) and the facility employed eighteen workers. By 1954 the receipts totaled $103,055.94 (equivalent to $1,235,522 in 2025) and the facility's employment had nearly quadrupled.

The post office weathered more than just growth and expansion. In 1939 it was one of the few public buildings to withstand a devastating tornado that ripped through the area and served as gathering place for survivors of the destruction.

During World War II the office achieved a "first class" rating. The distinction made it a choice location to purchase not only postage stamps but also war bonds to support the U.S. military's efforts overseas. The facility also served as a place for those of eligible age to register for the draft.

Post-war growth and the demands of a vibrant community led to the construction of a new postal facility on Seventh Avenue. On October 22, 1977, the old Anoka Post Office delivered its last parcel of mail.

== Later use ==
In 1978 the federal government put the site up for sale, and a year later it was listed on the National Register of Historic Places. The initial price tag and the costs associated with renovating and repurposing the building, however, prevented many, including the Anoka County Historical Society, from purchasing it. Counselor Realty finally stepped forward with a bid and a plan to restore much of the old building to its original grandeur. The greatest obstacle remained the building's old furnace, which required dismantling and updating from a coal heating system to a gas one. Over the next two years, the company spent $356,000 (equivalent to $1,391,000 in 2025) on construction and restoration.

Throughout the 1990s the building served as a multipurpose location. In addition to the real estate office, several businesses and firms cycled through the historic site, including PACT Charter School, a Christian ministry center, a gym, and a coin shop.

By 2000 the old post office had evolved once more into a retail space, creating a need for further updates to make the property attractive to shoppers. Interior fountains, along with mural paintings, were installed while the exterior received a flower garden that enhanced the landscape surrounding the building. Over the next fifteen years, the post office housed a tea room, a bridal shop, antique dealers, and a massage parlor. Throughout that time, Counselor Realty remained the one constant fixture.

Anoka's Post Office building made national news in September 2004, when President George W. Bush visited the site while campaigning for re-election. Bush spent twenty minutes signing autographs, visiting with the public, and posing for photos. Despite his presidential standing, he discovered his order for an egg salad sandwich at the site's delicatessen could not be fulfilled. Instead, he opted for the special of the day and appeared content.

In 2002 the United States Postal Service officially recognized Anoka as a Sesquicentennial station. It produced a stamp featuring a design of the historic post office which became a coveted souvenir. Anoka County's 150th anniversary, in 2007, created another opportunity for a special event and in 2016 yet a third as the building itself celebrated a centennial anniversary.

As of 2018 the building houses Emerald Isle Antiques & Gifts.

== See also ==
- List of United States post offices
- National Register of Historic Places listings in Anoka County, Minnesota
- PACT Charter School History
