= Ferry Street =

Ferry Street may refer to:

- Ferry Street, Hong Kong
- Ferry Street (Newark)

== See also ==
- Anoka–Champlin Mississippi River Bridge, in Minnesota, also called Ferry Street Bridge
- Ferry Street Bridge (Eugene, Oregon)
