= H. G. Leathers House =

Historic house in Minnesota, United States

- U.S. National Register of Historic Places
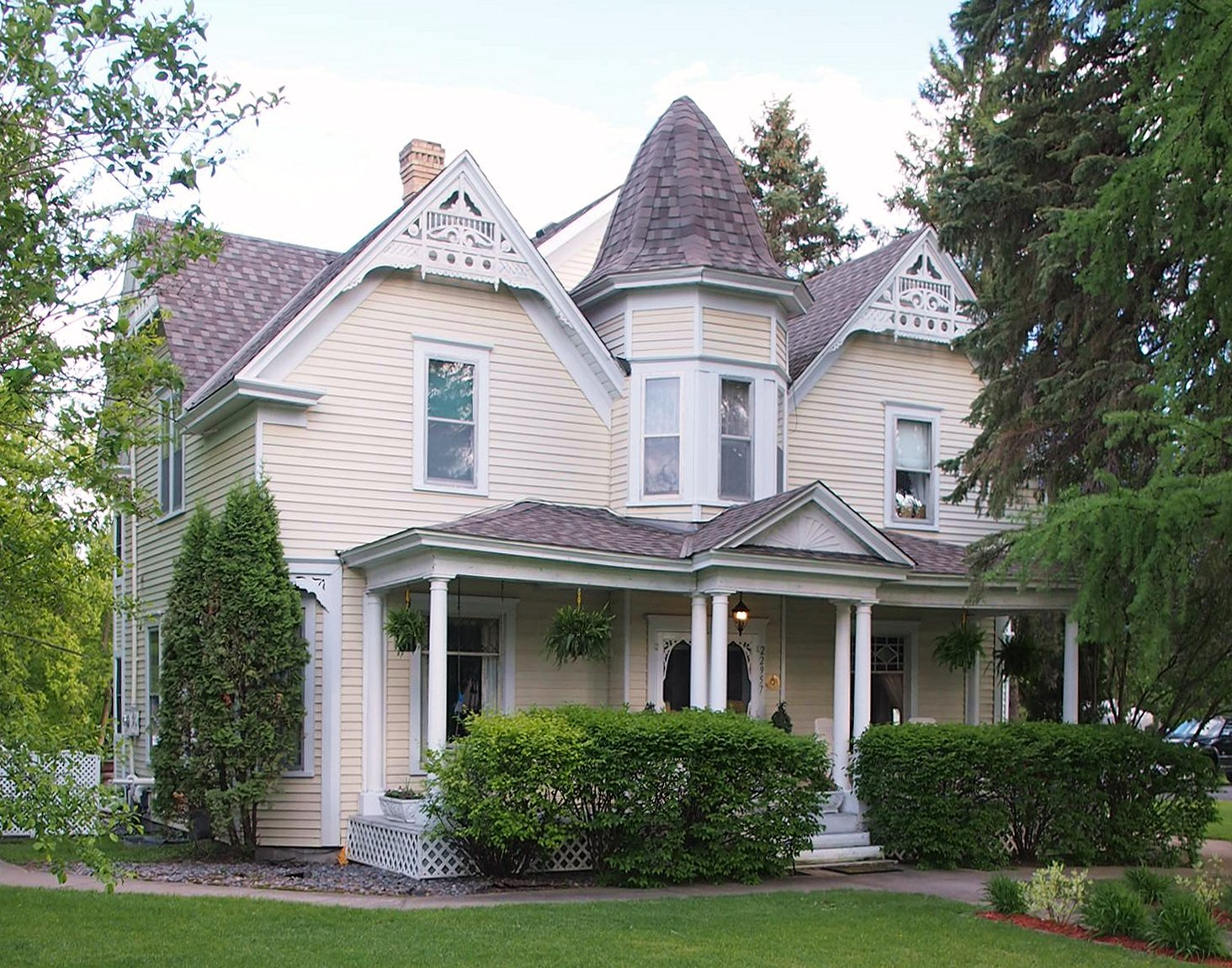
- The H. G. Leathers House viewed from the northwest

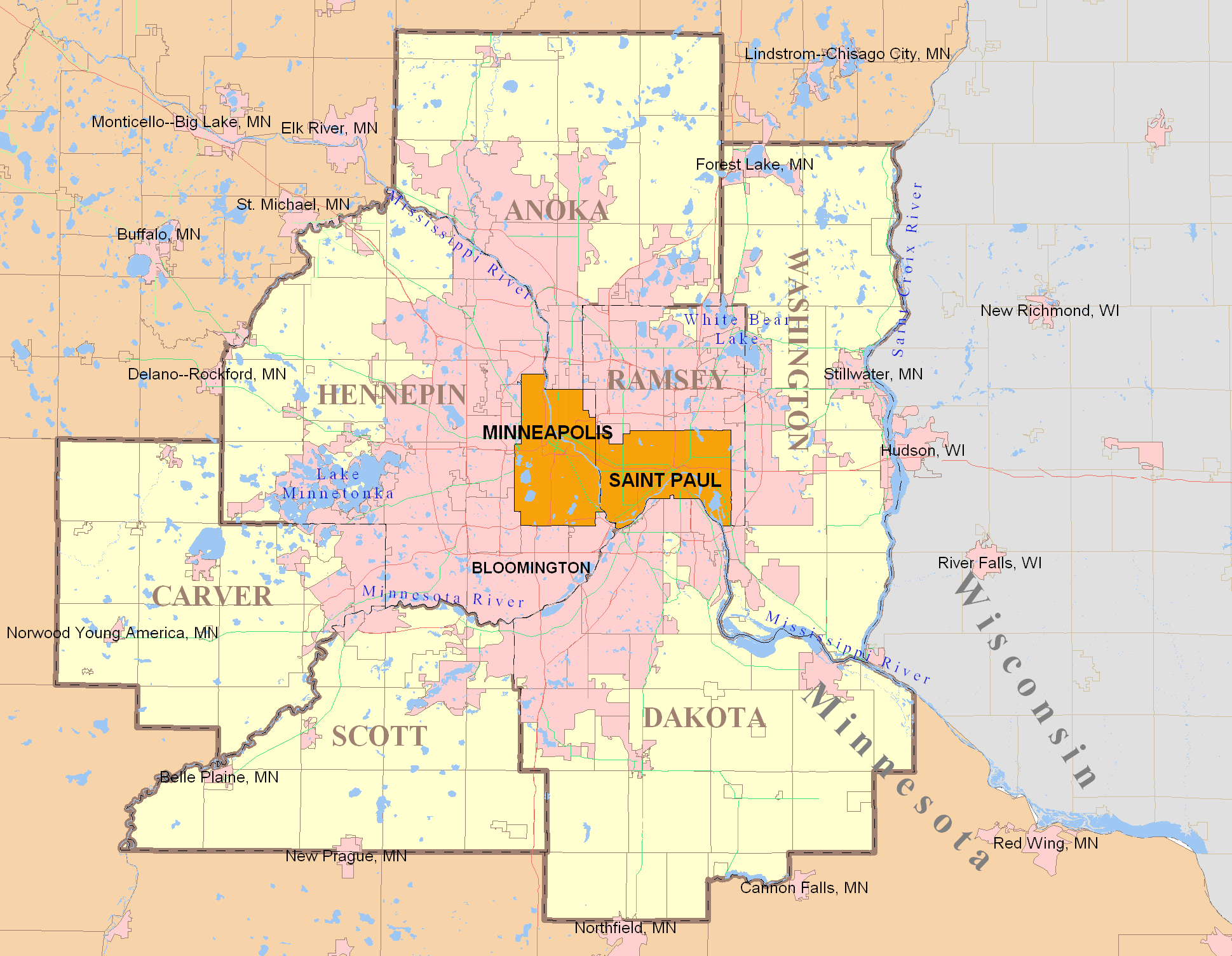
- Location within Minneapolis–Saint Paul Location within Minnesota Location within the United States
- Location: 22957 Rum River Boulevard NW, St. Francis, Minnesota
- Coordinates: 45°23′9.5″N 93°21′31″W
- Area: Less than one acre
- Built: c. 1883, c. 1890
- Architectural style: Victorian
- NRHP reference No.: 79001192
- Designated: December 26, 1979

The H. G. Leathers House is a historic house in St. Francis, Minnesota, United States. It was originally built on a site near the Rum River around 1883. Around 1890 it was moved closer to the river and expanded. The property was listed on the National Register of Historic Places in 1979 for its local significance in the themes of architecture and commerce. It was nominated for its association with three generations of an influential local family, and for its status as one of Anoka County's few Victorian houses.

== Description ==
The rear of the house was the first section constructed in about 1883 and consists of a two-story rectangular building with an attached one-story addition. Originally, this served as both a residence for the family as well as a dry goods store where they conducted their business.

In 1890 the family moved the building closer to the Rum River and added a section to its front west side. This front façade, made up of three bays and a two-and-a-half-story conical tower, is flanked by gabled two-and-a-half-story bays. Each of the front gables features elaborate fretwork, and a colonnaded veranda adds a classical element. Pilaster strips appear at each corner of the house. The interior contains a front entrance, two parlors, and a dining room on the first floor. Two bedrooms, a bath, and a formal landing make up the second floor. As of 2019, the home's turn-of-the-20th-century woodwork and hardware remain intact.

== History ==
Henry G. Leathers was born on December 11, 1858, in Oak Grove Township, Minnesota, and opened a dry goods store there in 1882. He sold everything from soup to blasting powder, and even peddled whiskey from a barrel in the basement. He traded firewood in exchange for his merchandise and extended credit to his neighbors until they could harvest and sell their crops. On September 19, 1888, he married Rose Barden.

Over the next four decades, Leathers served the community in numerous roles: as a registered pharmacist, a school board member, the president of the Commercial Club, a charter member of the Modern Woodmen and Workmen's Lodge, the president of the St. Francis Starch Company, and the manager of the Creamery and Canning Company. The construction of St. Francis' Methodist Church was due, in large part, to his and his family's efforts.

Beginning in 1904, Leathers served as the town's postmaster. He became the community's first car dealer in 1918, selling both Fords and gasoline from an open tank in the front yard of his home.

Henry and Rose Leathers had two children, Robert and Blanche, who remained in the St. Francis community after becoming adults. After Henry Leathers died, in 1932, Robert took over from his father as postmaster and remained in that position until 1969.

== See also ==
- National Register of Historic Places listings in Anoka County, Minnesota
