= Anoka Metro Regional Treatment Center =

Psychiatric hospital in Minnesota, United States

Coordinates: 45°12′55″N 93°22′51″W

Anoka-Metro Regional Treatment Center (AMRTC), located in Anoka, Minnesota, the county seat of Anoka County, provides inpatient and transitional services to patients with severe mental illness from the Twin Cities metropolitan area (Anoka, Carver, Dakota, Hennepin, Ramsey, Scott, Sherburne and Washington County). Due to overcrowding, some patients will be transferred to St. Peter's Regional Treatment Center; This is done by random selection upon intake.

The facility was previously the Anoka Asylum and in 1937 the name was changed to the Anoka State Hospital. The hospital provided care for mentally ill men starting in 1900 and for women in 1906. As a hospital for the mentally ill, until 1999, it housed thousands of patients, both male and female. It was once again renamed in 1985 to the current name.

== History ==
The hospital was founded as a state asylum in 1900 as a residence for mentally ill men and starting in 1906 for women. The city of Anoka was chosen over Hastings to help with overcrowding in mental institutions in St. Paul. Of the first 100 men brought to the asylum, 86 died and were buried on site in numbered graves. By 1948, the hospital itself was severely overcrowded, with a majority of the population being women. In the 1960s and 1970s many residents were moved out into nursing homes for better care. Historically, the facility was used for conversion therapy on teenagers.

In 1985 the site was renamed the Anoka Metro Regional Treatment Center. It was closed in 1999 and was given to Anoka County.

== Facilities ==
- A 110-bed inpatient mental health facility
- Two 16-bed community based facilities
- Transitional community support program
- 3-month State mandated habitual sex offender program.
- No longer treating chemical dependency.

== Patient services ==
- Mental health services. Individualized treatment designed to assist patients in reaching and maintaining psychiatric stability and in developing the necessary skills and supports to survive in a group home setting. The treatment center focuses on interaction with the patients working with their mental illness to achieve a level of stability. Medications may be mandatory for most clients. Services are provided in the inpatient psychiatric facility and in two Co-ed community-based apartment buildings.
- Community transition services. A multi-disciplinary team of AMRTC staff provide services to discharged patients who have experienced long or frequent regional treatment center hospitalizations and who require help in leaving the facility and/or in remaining in the community; they will be monitored by the AMRTC staff until deemed fit for unmonitored normal social interactions.
- Mental Health Initiatives. AMRTC employees work in teams with county staff and private providers to support individuals with severe and persistent mental illness in successfully living in their group home.

== Professional services ==
Training opportunities are available to professionals and paraprofessionals. Training is provided through classroom education, computer-based training and video conferencing. The education department sponsors seminars and grand rounds for medical staff and coordinates lectures for University of Minnesota medical students.

AMRTC also operates internship and practicum experiences for students in psychology, social work, recreational therapy and nursing.

AMRTC is accredited by the Minnesota Medical Association to provide Continuing Medical Education for physicians.

As of January 1, 2014, AMRTC is working with Minnesota Community Offender Management to provide volunteer opportunities to inmates of the minimum security Plymouth Work House (ACF)

== Controversies ==
In the 1970s there were a number of issues with the patients who would escape the hospital grounds. The patients would shoplift, start fires and loiter. Female patients would also be lured off the hospital grounds and be sexually assaulted by members of the community.

In 1976 a patient escaped, broke into a nearby home and murdered a woman, Mary Galbraith.

On May 29, 1984, workers at the AMRTC picketed demanding better protections after a worker was assaulted by a patient. Anoka Police had been providing security to the establishment through December 1994, but ended the arrangement because officers were limited in what kinds of actions they could take in what is considered a hospital situation.

On January 30, 1996, a patient escaped AMRTC by climbing over a fence. Police responded and tried to apprehend the patient, but he was able to steal a police car by entering through the passenger-side door and led police on a short pursuit. The patient stopped a few blocks away and surrendered to police.
