= Flora Aldrich =

American physician (1859–1921)

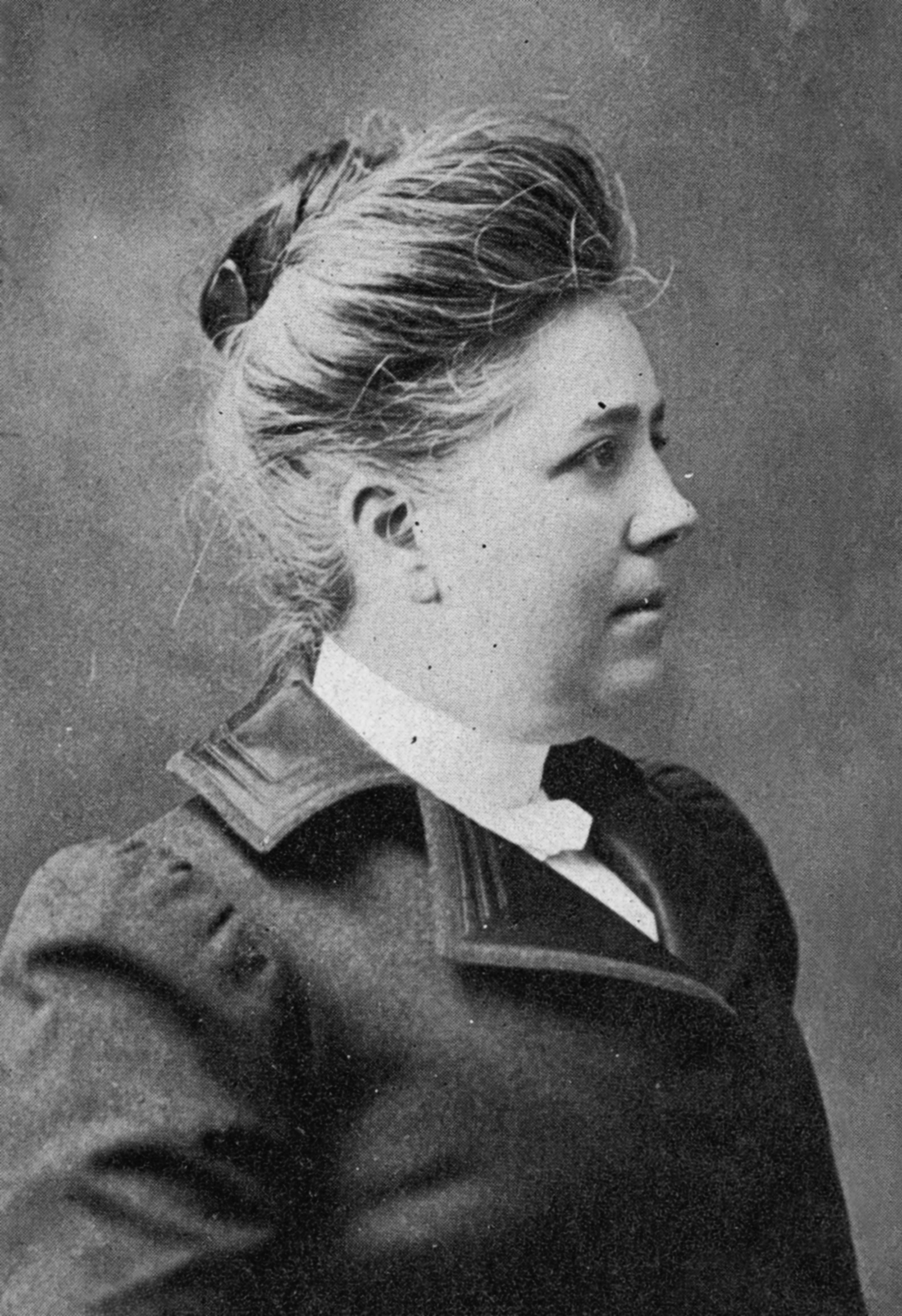
- Flora L. S. Aldrich, from the frontispiece of her 1910 novel
- Born: Flora L. Southard; October 6, 1859; Westford, New York
- Died: March 19, 1921 (aged 61); Anoka, Minnesota
- Other names: F. L. S. Aldrich
- Occupations: Physician, writer, clubwoman

Flora L. Southard Aldrich (October 6, 1859 – March 19, 1921) was an American physician and writer based in Minnesota.

== Early life ==
Flora L. Southard was born in Westford, New York, the daughter of Solomon Wesley Southard and Amanda Sutherland Southard. She earned a medical degree in 1887 from the Minnesota Medical College, with further studies in Austria and Germany.

== Career ==
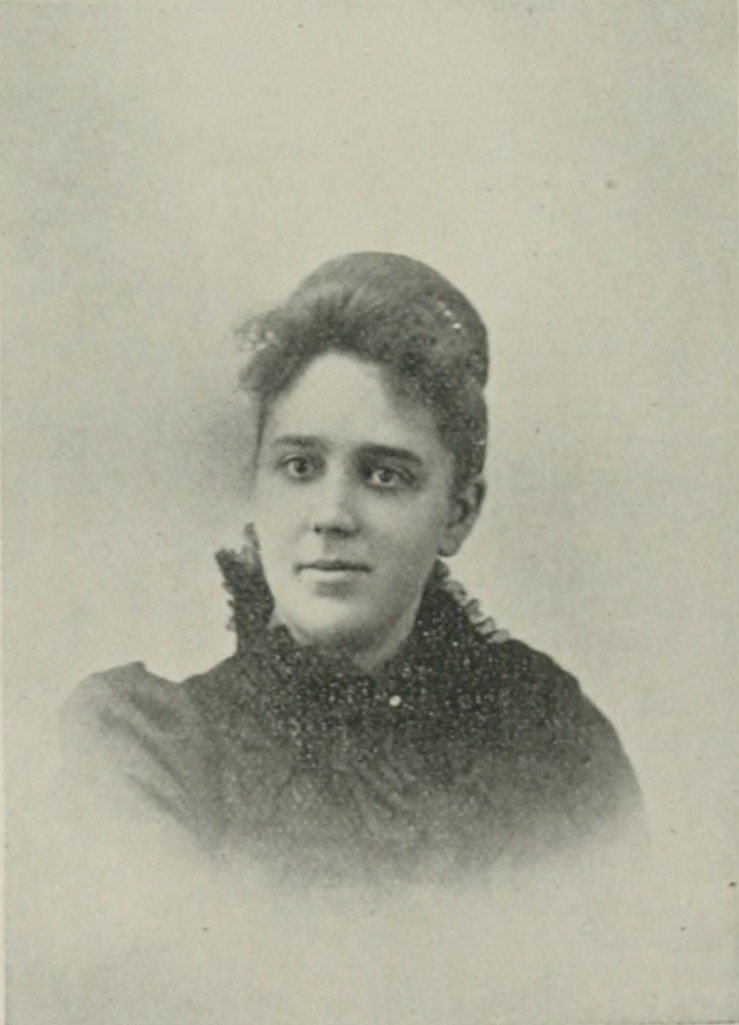
Portrait in "A Woman of the Century"

Aldrich moved to Anoka, Minnesota in 1884, and began her medical practice there a few years later. She was the first president of Anoka's women's literary club, the Philolectian Society, which established the town's first public library in 1894. She was founding vice-president of the library board.

Aldrich wrote The Boudoir Companion (1901), a personal health and hygiene manual for women. Her advice included the recommendations that "Every pregnant woman will be benefited by sleeping alone" and "Walking in open air is the ideal form of exercise for the pregnant woman". She also endorsed breastfeeding as healthful for both mother and infant, but cautioned against eating bananas, reading, and sewing in the immediate postpartum period. She wrote two further books: My Child and I (1903), a child-rearing manual, and a novel, The One Man (1910).

Aldrich was active in woman's suffrage work in Minnesota. She served as a presidential delegate at the 1920 Minnesota Democratic State Convention. She was a member of the American Medical Association, the Minnesota Federation of Women's Clubs and the Minnesota Public Health Association. During World War I, she was a member of the American Medical Women's Hospital Association, and Minnesota state chair of the Belgian Infant Relief committee.

== Personal life ==
Flora Southard married physician Alanson George Aldrich in 1883. Her husband died in 1916, and she died in 1921, aged 61 years, in Anoka. Her home in Anoka housed the local historical society in the 1970s and 1980s, and now houses an antique store; it is part of Colonial Hall and Masonic Lodge No. 30, on the National Register of Historic Places. The Philolectian Society of Anoka remained in existence as late as 2017.
