= Tom Mangan =

American politician (1926–1998)

Thomas Joseph Mangan

Member of the Minnesota House of Representatives
- In office 1975–1978

Personal details
- Born: March 12, 1926 Milwaukee, Wisconsin, U.S.
- Died: October 28, 1998 (aged 72)
- Party: Democratic Party
- Education: University of Wisconsin (BA), University of Minnesota, University of Michigan (MA)
- Occupation: Educator, politician
- Profession: Special education director

Military service
- Branch/service: United States Navy Reserve
- Years of service: World War II

Thomas Joseph Mangan (March 12, 1926 – October 28, 1998) was an American politician and educator.

Mangan was born in Milwaukee, Wisconsin. He graduated from Bay View High School in Milwaukee and served in the United States Navy Reserve during World War II. Mangan graduated from University of Wisconsin in 1950. He went to University of Minnesota for graduated studies and then received his master's degree from University of Michigan in 1956. Mangan lived in Anoka, Minnesota with his wife and family and was a director for special education in the Anoka Hennepin School District. He served as a hearing consultant for the Minnesota Department of Education. Mangan served in the Minnesota House of Representatives from 1975 to 1978 and was a Democrat.
