= DecoPac, Inc. =

US cake decorating product company

- Company type: Private
- Industry: Consumer Goods
- Founded: Minneapolis, Minnesota, U.S. (1982)
- Founders: James T. McGlynn
- Headquarters: Anoka, Minnesota, United States
- Area served: United States, Canada, Europe
- Key people: Cindy Hampton Mahoney (CEO); Peter Shea (Co-Chairman of the board); Mike McGlynn (Co-Chairman of the board)
- Products: Cake Decorations, Cake Decorating Supplies
- Owner: The McGlynn Family & Snow Phipps, LLC
- Website: www.decopac.com

DecoPac, Inc. is a supplier and marketer of cake decorating products headquartered in Anoka, Minnesota. DecoPac supplies bakeries, professional cake decorators and cake decorating enthusiasts across the United States, Canada, and Europe. The company was formed in 1982 as an internal supplier of cake decorations for McGlynn's Bakery stores.

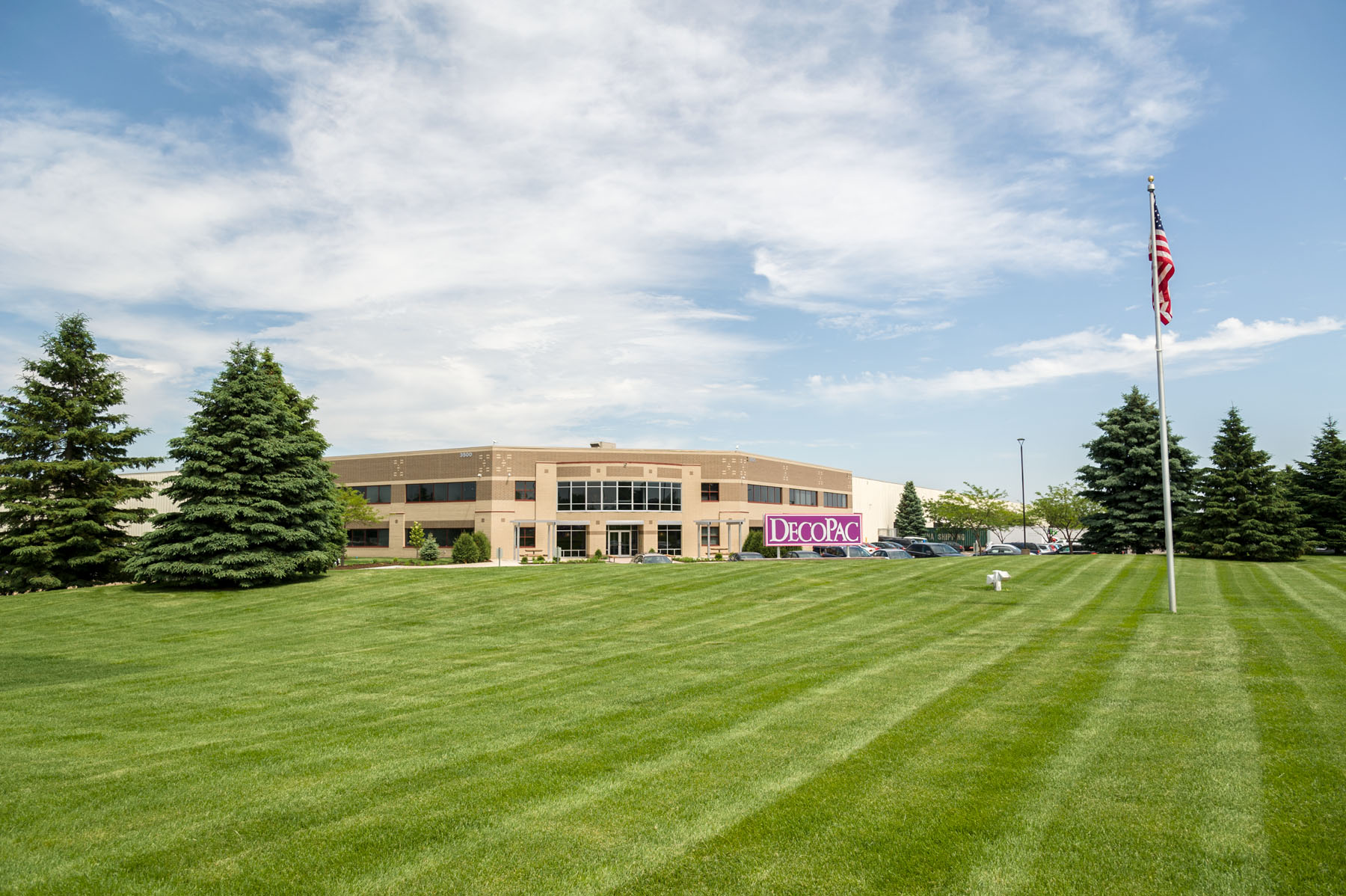
Corporate headquarters for DecoPac, Inc., a supplier of cake decorations and baking supplies.

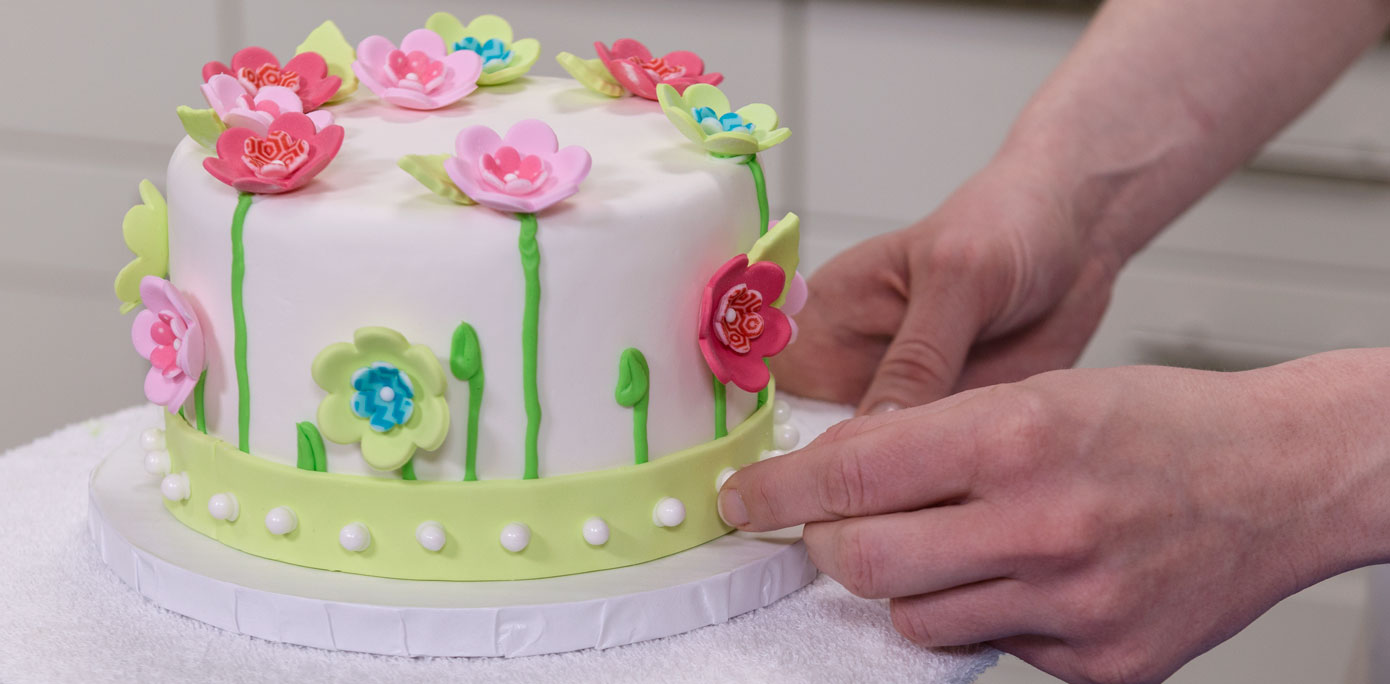
Mother's day cake design.

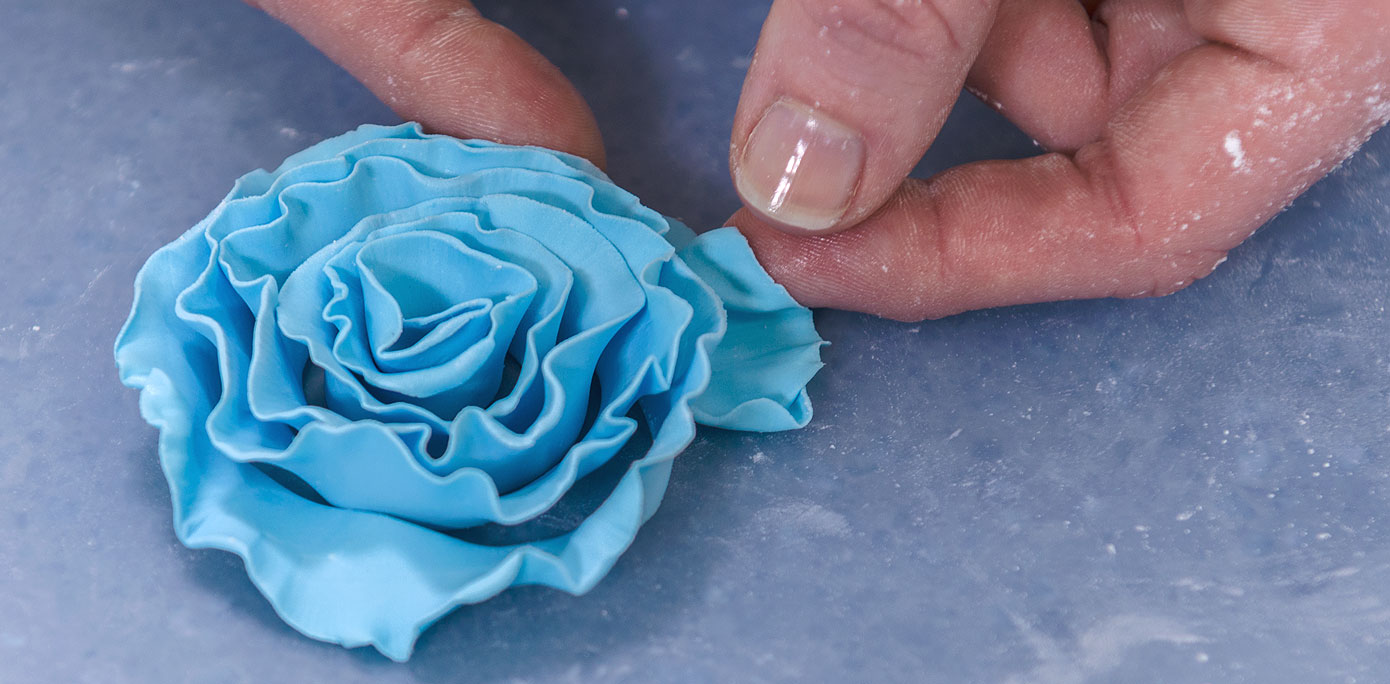
Fondant rose edible cake decoration.

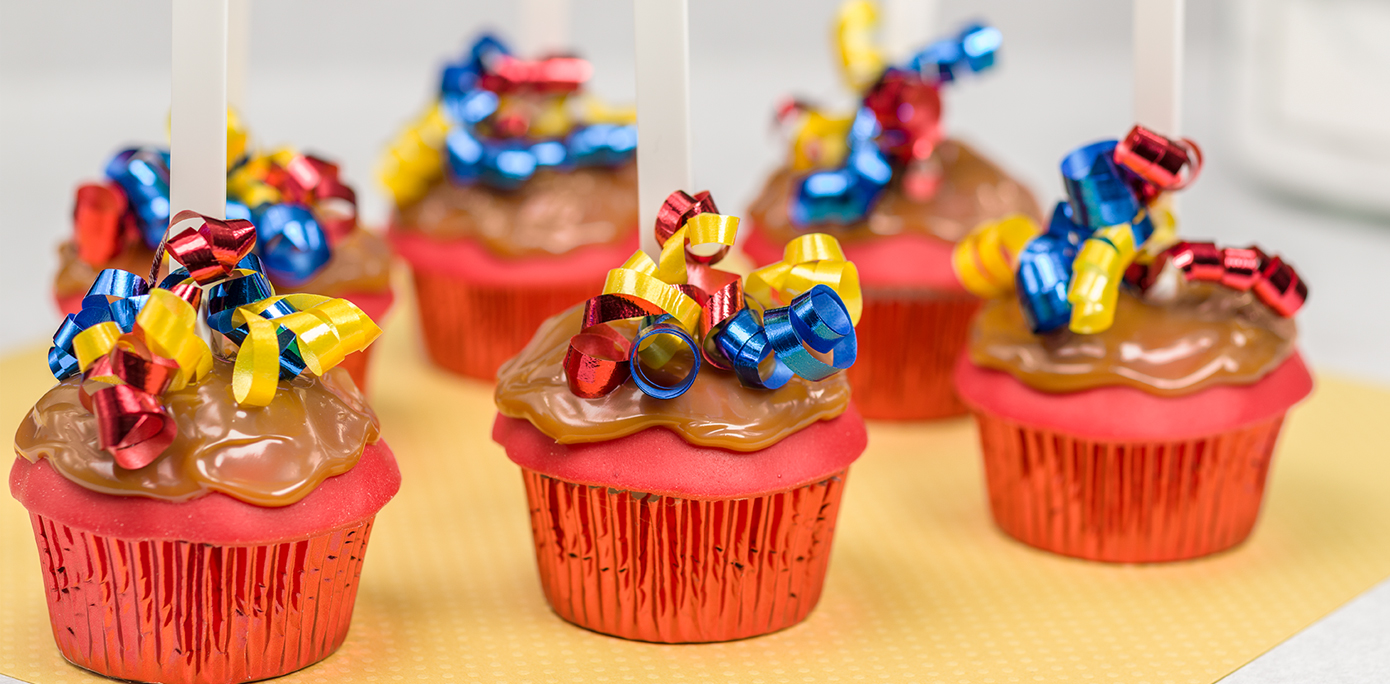
Caramel apple cupcake designs.

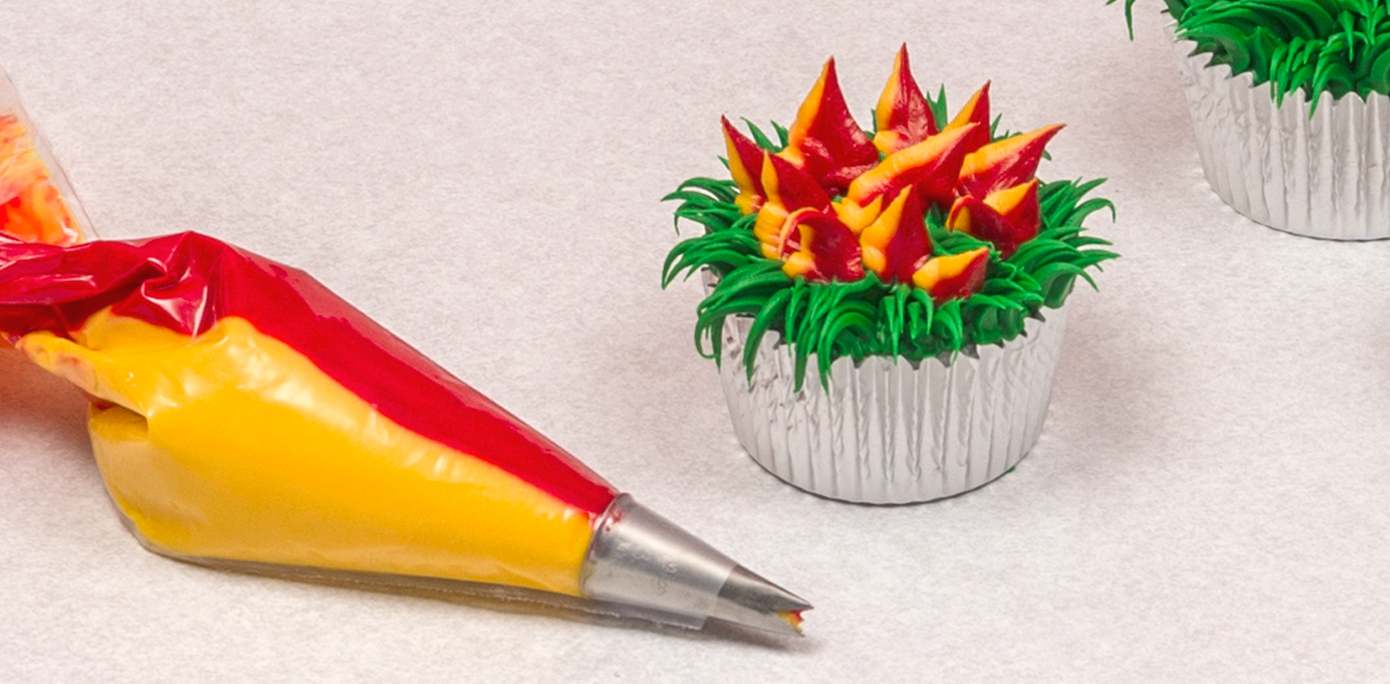
Piping bag and tip for cake decorating.

== History ==
DecoPac began as part of McGlynn Bakeries, which started as a single retail bakery in Minneapolis, Minnesota in 1919. The company expanded, increasing the number of retail bakeries and in-store supermarket bakeries. In 1965, McGlynn’s launched an innovative new approach to selling cakes by focusing on decorating cakes in view of consumers instead of the back room.

In the 1970s, McGlynn’s produced a book about decorated cakes, The Magic of Cakes. In 1982, DecoPac was formed as an internal unit supplying cake decorations to its own McGlynn’s Bakery stores.

Soon other bakeries learned of DecoPac through industry associations and DecoPac began marketing pre-packaged cake decorating kits, called DecoSets, to supermarkets, independent retail bakeries and bakery distributors. Since 1987, DecoPac has developed relationships and licensing agreements that give the company the right to market cake decorating products featuring popular characters and properties from Disney, Nickelodeon, Mattel, Hasbro, DreamWorks, Marvel Comics, LucasFilm, Warner Bros., Star Trek, Peanuts, Nintendo, NBCUniversal, Sesame Workshop, and professional sports such as from the NHL, NBA, NFL, and MLB.

DecoPac acquired Culpitt, Ltd., a supplier and wholesaler of sugar crafting edibles and equipment in the UK, in 1998. Culpitt manufactures cake boards, cake decorations, sugar fondant sheets, printed edible cake decorations and molded sugar cake decorations and sells to customers in the UK, Europe, Australia and New Zealand.

In 2002, DecoPac launched Cakes.com to connect consumers with bakeries to place cake orders online. Since that time, Cakes.com has evolved and in 2014 began selling DecoSets and other cake decorating products directly to consumers for use in decorating their own cakes.

In 2015 DecoPac purchased one of their largest competitors, Bakery Crafts. This strategic decision made them the world's largest supplier of cake decorations in the world.

On September 19, 2017 DecoPac, the once entirely family owned business, sold a large stake of the company to a private equity firm, Snow Phipps LLC.

== Corporate Governance ==
DecoPac, Inc. is a for-profit, private business which has a Board of Directors consisting of family owners, non-family management, and outside independent directors.

As of 2022, the company’s management included:

- Cindy Hampton Mahoney, CEO
- John Gardner, Vice President, Global Marketing
- Liz Glover, Vice President, Design & Development
- Kurt Kozacek, Vice President, Sales
- Steven Twedell, Vice President, Finance

== Company Products & Services ==
DecoPac markets products, services, and technologies to bakeries and baking enthusiasts who specialize in cakes, cupcakes, cookies, and more. DecoPac sells cake decorating products and supplies to businesses and consumers.

- Cake decorating kits
- Cupcake picks
- Cake decorations
- Print-on-Demand cake decorating systems
- Pre-cut fondant shapes
- Pre-rolled fondant sheets
- SugarSoft® edible cake decorations
- Decorated cake merchandising books
- Online cake ordering kiosks
- Food Colors
- Candles

== Brands ==
DecoPac owns a number of brands that market to businesses and consumers. DecoPac, PhotoCake, and Culpitt sell to bakeries, supplying them with cake toppers, edible images, and licensed cake decorations. Bakery Crafts supplies bakeries primarily, but also sells packaged cake decorating goods to consumers in retail stores and supermarkets.

=== Consumer Brands ===
DecoPac's consumer brands include:

- Cakes.com
- Culpitt Cake Club
- The Craft Company

=== Corporate Brands ===
DecoPac's business-to-business brands include:

- PhotoCake
- DecoPac
- CelebrationIQ
- Culpitt
- Sugarfayre
- Bakery Crafts
- ProBest, LLC
