= Heman L. Ticknor House =

Historic house in Minnesota, United States

- U.S. National Register of Historic Places
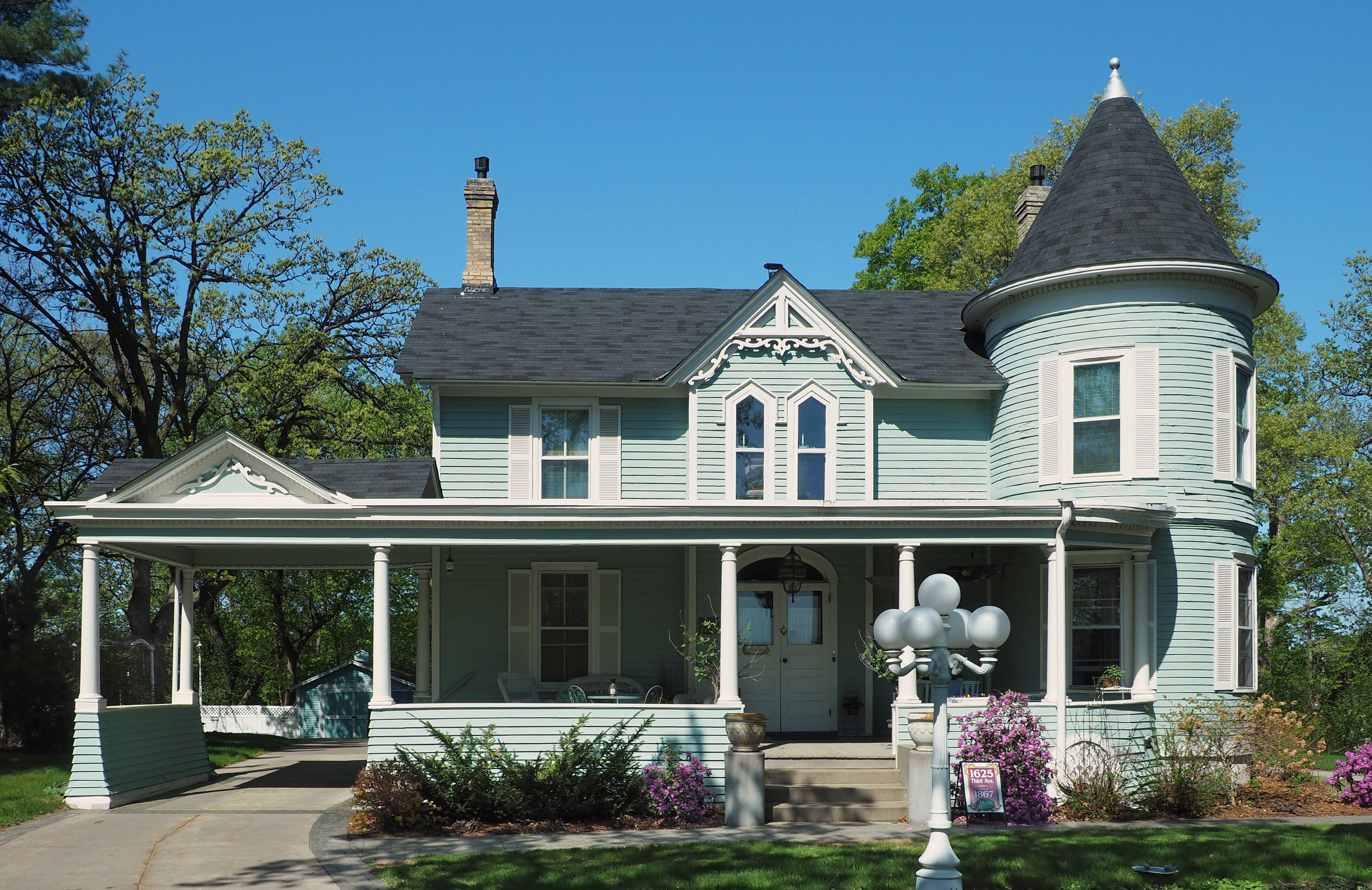
- The Heman L. Ticknor House viewed from the east

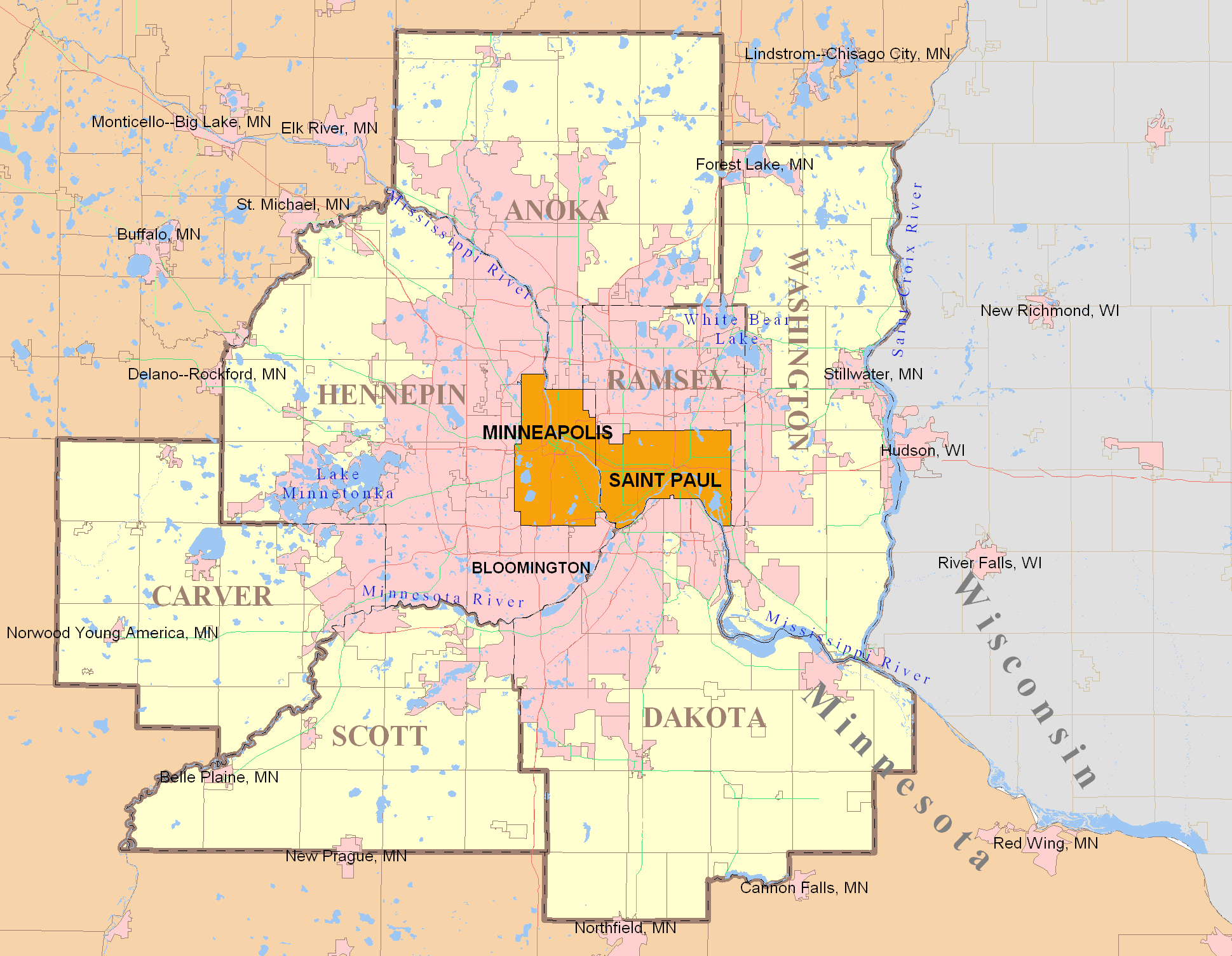
- Location within Minneapolis–Saint Paul Location within Minnesota Location within the United States
- Location: 1625 3rd Avenue S., Anoka, Minnesota
- Coordinates: 45°11′37.7″N 93°23′18″W
- Area: Less than one acre
- Built: 1867, 1901, 1930s
- Architectural style: Gothic Revival, Queen Anne, Neoclassical
- NRHP reference No.: 79001184
- Designated: December 27, 1979

The Heman L. Ticknor House is a historic house in Anoka, Minnesota, United States. It was originally built in 1867 in Gothic Revival style, then remodeled multiple times in the early 20th century to accrue substantial Queen Anne and Neoclassical elements. The Ticknor House was listed on the National Register of Historic Places in 1979 for its local significance in the themes of architecture, commerce, and exploration/settlement. It was nominated for its association with three generations of an influential local family and its representation of their evolving architectural tastes.

In 1996 the home began to operate as Ticknor Hill Bed and Breakfast.

== Origin ==
The first generation of Ticknors was among the original settler-colonists of Anoka who arrived and built the river town in the mid-19th century. The family opened a dry goods store in 1855 before converting it into a cigar-manufacturing business in 1860. Building upon this success, Heman Ticknor expanded the businesses to include a drug store, which he opened in 1864.

In 1867, Ticknor built a new home for himself and his new wife, Ann Greenwald (née Sweeney). The floor plan of the structure, built in the Gothic Revival style, was in the shape of a "T", with the front entrance overlooking the confluence of the Rum and Mississippi Rivers. Its Gothic elements included gables, elaborate bargeboards, and arched windows in the front façade. The couple installed three fireplaces, one built with locally manufactured brick.

== Later history ==
Shortly before Heman Ticknor's death in 1897, his daughter Zale and son-in-law John Niles took up residence in the house. Later they added their own unique architectural updates. John practiced law as an attorney while Zale worked within Anoka's prominent women's organization, the Philolectian Society, to establish a city library.

The couple's plans included dividing the existing structure into three sections. The front section, which faced west, switched places with the rear section, while the center portion remained intact. These subtle but significant changes gave the house a fashionable new Third Avenue South address—highly desirable in 1901. Historians believe that changing the address was a major driver behind the remodel work. Other architectural changes included the addition of a tower section with Queen Anne and Neoclassical elements. A full front porch was added, along with Corinthian columns, a bay window, and a porte-cochère.

In 1913 the house passed to the next generation: Natalie Niles, daughter of John and Zale, who married Arthur Lee Smith. The couple raised their son, Ticknor Niles Smith, in the house. In 1938, after Ticknor went away to college, the Smiths added one and a half stories to the back of the house. The couple further modified the interior, dividing it into three sections for apartments.

In 1977 Ticknor Smith sold the residence out of the family, at which point further renovations and extensive interior remodeling transformed the house into a duplex. In that same year, the house was nominated for inclusion on the National Register of Historic Places. It achieved that recognition in 1980.

By 1996, the famed house had assumed a new role as a bed and breakfast. Once again it underwent substantial remodeling, this time by its latest owners, Lynne and Terry Rickert, who created four separate rooms to accommodate guests. Exterior renovations did not result in any major changes to the structure.

== See also ==
- National Register of Historic Places listings in Anoka County, Minnesota
