= Ernest A. Larsen =

American politician and educator (1932–2026)

Ernest A. Larsen (December 26, 1932 − April 14, 2026) was an American politician and educator.

Larsen was born in Mille Lacs County, Minnesota. He graduated from University of Minnesota with his bachelor's degree in vocational education and was the assistant director of the Anoka Area Vocational Technical Institute in Anoka, Minnesota. He lived with his wife and family in Anoka, Minnesota. Larsen served in the Minnesota House of Representatives in 1983 and 1984 and in 1987 and 1988. He was a Democrat.
