= Sparre Barn =

- U.S. National Register of Historic Places
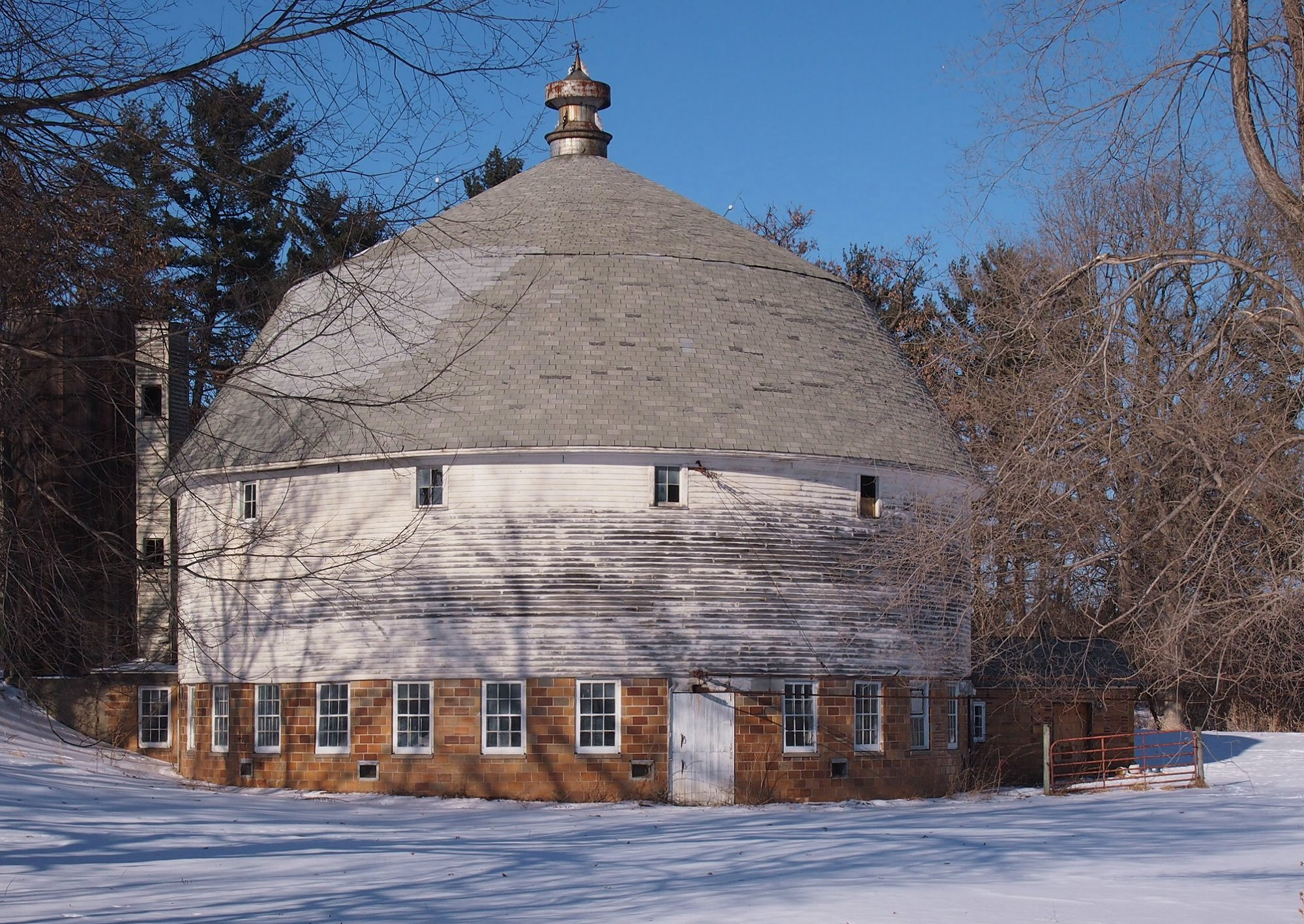
- The Sparre Barn from the south-southwest

- Location within Minnesota Location within the United States
- Location: Nowthen, Minnesota, US
- Nearest city: Elk River, Minnesota
- Coordinates: 45°20′4.8″N 93°28′9.4″W
- Area: less than one acre
- Built: 1917–24
- Architect: Marsh, Ernest B.
- NRHP reference No.: 80001935
- Added to NRHP: January 10, 1980

The Sparre Barn is a round barn in the city of Nowthen, Minnesota, United States. The barn is located on the west shore of Bass Lake. The basement is constructed of red tile, and the upper level of the barn is sheathed with shiplap siding. The interior space contains a circle of stanchions for feeding cattle, while the upper level has storage for feed and equipment.

The barn was built between 1917 and 1924. The architect, Ernest Benjamin Marsh who along with his father Fredrick L. Marsh, was locally known for other structures such as neoclassical and Georgian Revival residences. This round barn was part of a trend, which started in the late 19th century, of round barns whose plans were circulated as an advance in "scientific agriculture." The barn was used as a dairy barn from 1924 through the 1940s. As Anoka County experienced more suburban development, the majority of the county's dairy barns were demolished. The Sparre Barn was the best-preserved dairy barn in the county, as of the time of nomination in 1979.

== See also ==
- National Register of Historic Places listings in Anoka County, Minnesota
