= Anoka Technical College =

Technical college in Anoka, Minnesota, U.S.

- Type: Public, two-year technical college
- Established: 1967
- Affiliations: Minnesota State Colleges and Universities, NJCAA, ICCAC
- President: Dr. Kent Hanson
- Location: Anoka, Minnesota, United States
- Colors: Gold, Black & Gray
- Website: www.anokatech.edu

Anoka Technical College is a public two-year technical college in Anoka, Minnesota, founded in 1967. The school is a member of the Minnesota State Colleges and Universities system.

== History ==
Beginning July 2011, Anoka Technical College and Anoka-Ramsey Community College, which has campuses in Coon Rapids and Cambridge, share a single president as part of an effort to better serve students in the area of the northern suburbs of Minneapolis–Saint Paul served by the two schools.

Dr. Kent Hanson has been serving as president of Anoka-Ramsey Community College since 2013.

== Academics ==
Academic programs at the college generally fall into the following categories:

- Automotive
- Construction and Manufacturing
- General Education
- Health
- Horticulture
- Information Technology and Business

Anoka Technical College is accredited by the North Central Association of Colleges and Schools, Commission of Institutions of Higher Education. All programs offered at Anoka Technical College are approved by the Minnesota State College and Universities system, the Minnesota Division of Rehabilitation Services, and the state-approving agency of Veterans Education. The college was granted initial accreditation by the North Central Association on March 5, 1999.

== Campus ==
The campus is located in the City of Anoka and partially rests on the eastern border of the City of Ramsey. The building is largely the superstructure of the old Char-Gale plant. The plant transitioned in the war effort to make tarps for the military during WWII. Periodic investments over time have transformed the building into a state-of-the-art technical college.
