= Jackson Hotel (Anoka, Minnesota) =

- U.S. National Register of Historic Places
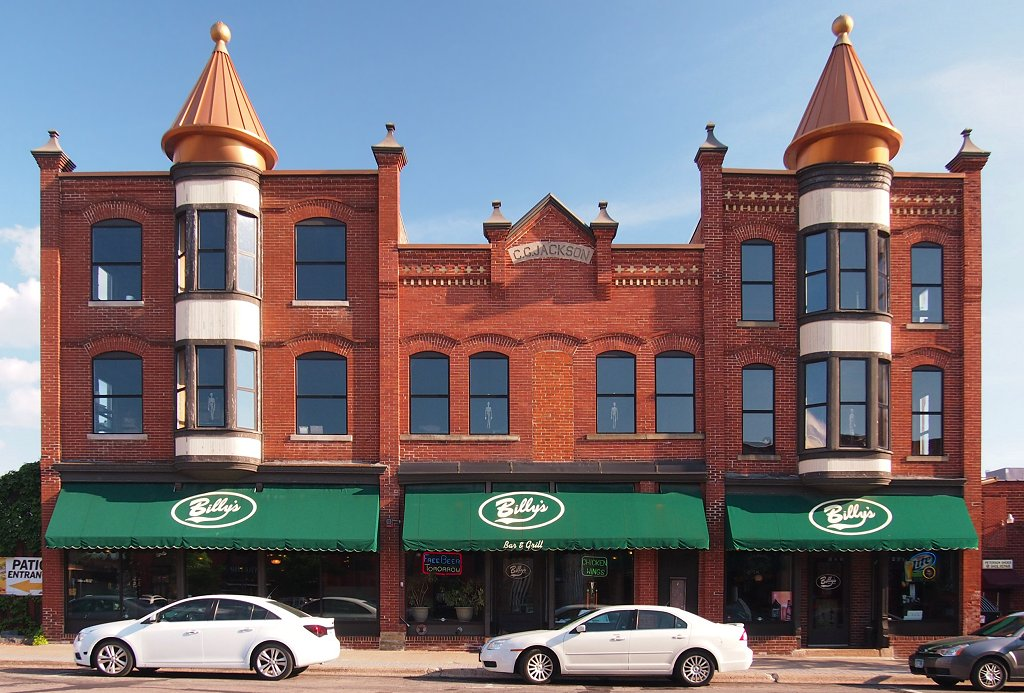
- The Jackson Hotel from the north

- Location within Minnesota Location within the United States
- Location: 214 Jackson St., Anoka, Minnesota
- Coordinates: 45°11′55″N 93°23′17″W
- Area: less than one acre
- Built: 1884
- NRHP reference No.: 78001525
- Added to NRHP: December 08, 1978

The Jackson Hotel is an historic building in Anoka, Minnesota, United States.

The hotel was built in 1884 during the rebuilding of downtown Anoka after a fire. The hotel operated from 1884 through 1975 and played a central role in Anoka's commerce. It was located at the hub of water, rail, and overland trade routes, and served a variety of travelers.

The Jackson Hotel first served farmers and loggers who brought their goods to Anoka for sale. It later served traveling businessmen, politicians, photographers, lecturers, entertainers, and tourists. Traveling salesmen also used the hotel's sample room as a showroom and office.

The hotel had a reputation as the leading hotel in Anoka and one of the best hotels in Minnesota.

The Jackson Hotel building was built in five sections at different times. The two-story center section, built in 1884, bears the name of its builder, C.G. Jackson. In 1885 a two-story brick addition was built to the rear of the center section. In 1888 a large three-story brick addition was built on the west side, and another three-story addition was built on the east side several years later. All three sections facing Jackson Street are built of red brick.
