= Anoka–Champlin Mississippi River Bridge =

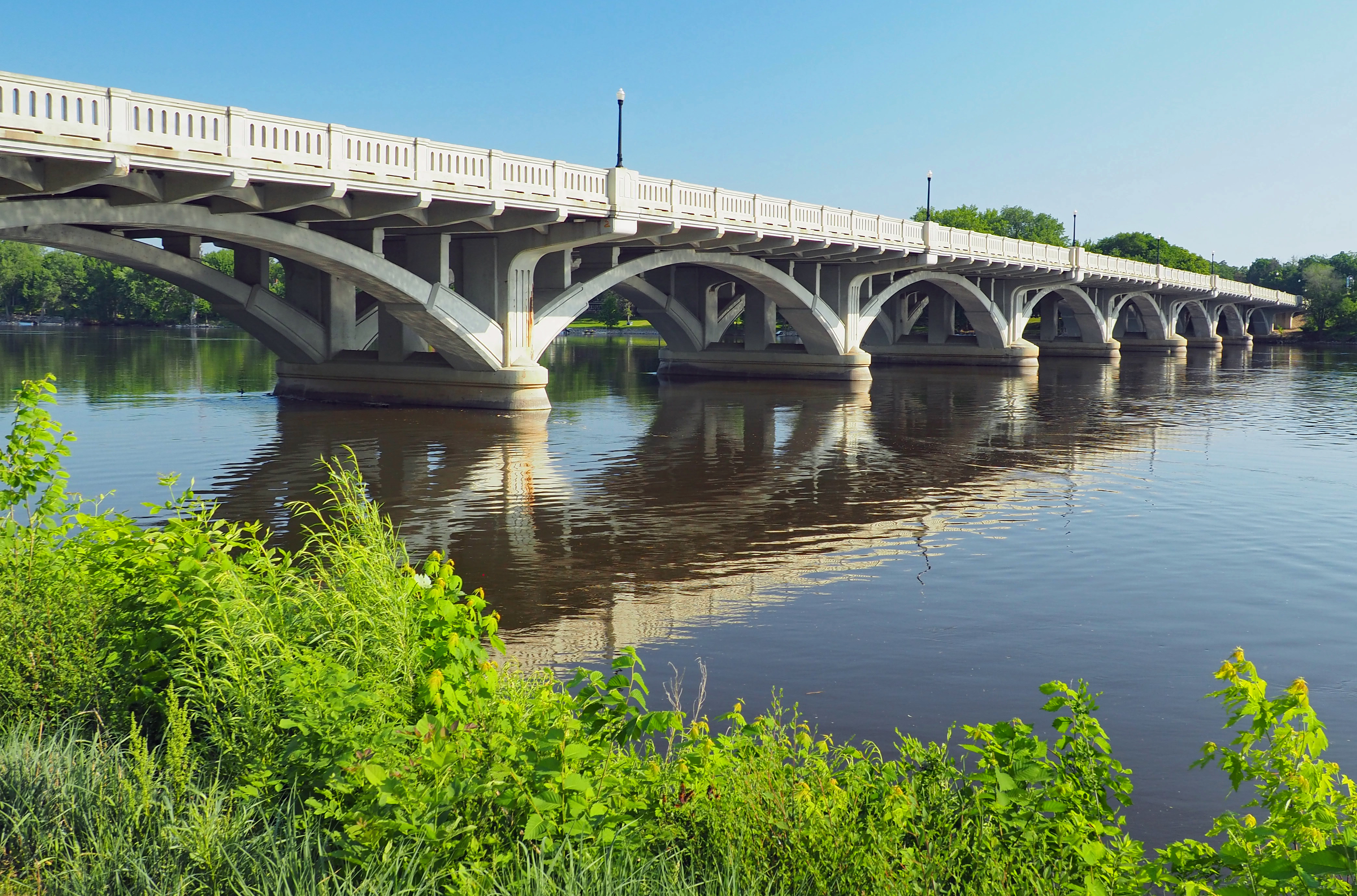
- The Anoka–Champlin Bridge from the south
- Coordinates: 45°11′29.5″N 93°23′43.5″W
- Carries: Four lanes of US 169
- Crosses: Mississippi River
- Locale: Anoka and Champlin, Minnesota
- Maintained by: Minnesota Department of Transportation
- ID number: 4380

Characteristics
- Design: Open spandrel concrete deck arch bridge
- Total length: 1,038.4 feet (316.5 m)
- Width: 56 feet (17 m)
- Longest span: 108 feet (33 m)
- Clearance below: 19 feet (5.8 m)

History
- Opened: 1929
- Anoka–Champlin Mississippi River Bridge
- U.S. National Register of Historic Places
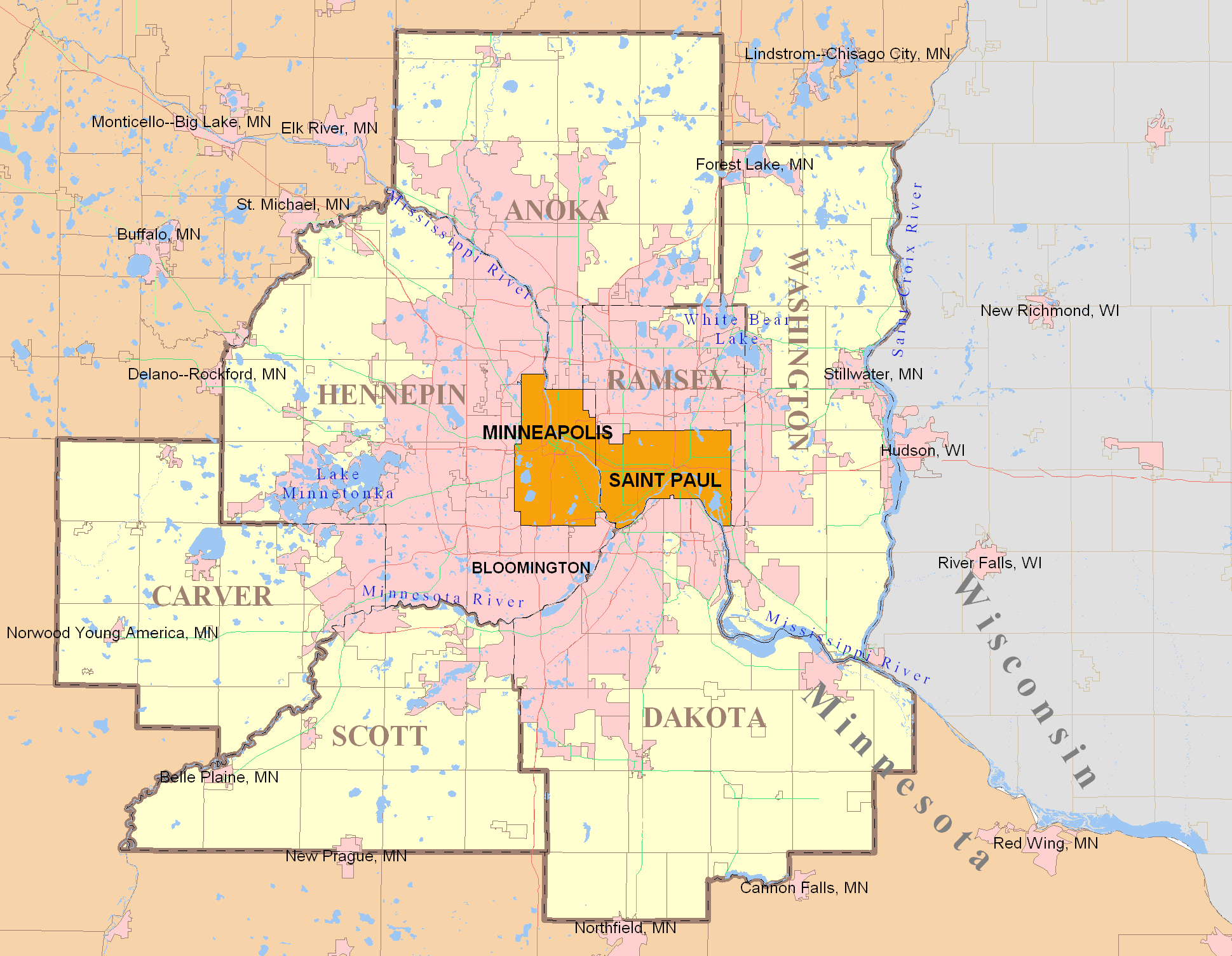
- Location within Minneapolis–Saint Paul Location within Minnesota Location within the United States
- Built by: Minneapolis Bridge Company
- Architect: C.M. Babcock
- NRHP reference No.: 79001181
- Added to NRHP: December 31, 1979

Location
- Interactive map of Anoka–Champlin Mississippi River Bridge

The Anoka–Champlin Mississippi River Bridge, also known as the Ferry Street Bridge, is a 10-span open spandrel concrete deck arch bridge that spans the Mississippi River between Anoka and Champlin, Minnesota, United States. It was built in 1929 by the Minneapolis Bridge Company, replacing an 1884 bridge at the same site.

The bridge was listed on the National Register of Historic Places in 1979 for its state-level significance in the themes of commerce and engineering. It was nominated for exemplifying the open-spandrel concrete arch bridges developed in the Minneapolis–Saint Paul area in the late 1920s, and for providing a key physical connection between two river communities with longstanding economic ties.

== 1884 predecessor ==
The first structural span of the Mississippi River between Anoka and Champlin was built at this location in 1884. The original bridge consisted of four steel spans with a wooden deck measuring 18 feet (5.5 m) wide. One of the spans could rotate, allowing for the passage of steamboats and other large vessels. The bridge's wood decking limited traffic capacity, and individuals received a fine of $10 (equivalent to $360 in 2025) if they crossed at a pace faster than a brisk walk.

After the advent of the automobile at the turn of the 20th century, the bridge became inadequate. The U.S. War Department determined that in the event of a national crisis, it would prove too narrow and weak to support military vehicles, and would impede the swift flow of river traffic.

In 1926 engineers wrote proposals for a modern structure to replace the outdated and insufficient original. Until a new bridge could be completed, the Minnesota Highway Department set a definite load restriction of six tons and posted signs to that effect. But the signage, heavy fines, and even threats of criminal prosecution failed to deter drivers with excessive loads from inflicting damage on the bridge.

== Construction ==
During the 1920s concrete gained popularity as a material for bridge construction since it was cheaper than stone yet similar in its compressive strength. Designers of the new Anoka–Champlin Bridge used an arch form and encased steel to compensate for concrete's low tensile strength. Since it did not require painting, as steel did, the bridge was considered relatively low maintenance.

Construction workers built the Anoka–Champlin Bridge's concrete arches using falsework—scaffolds and wooden forms used to pour concrete. This method proved time consuming, labor-intensive, and expensive. In the 1950s, prestressed concrete girders replaced this type of bridge construction.

== Later history ==
By 1991 the bridge had deteriorated to the point where it needed to be renovated. A temporary bridge was built alongside the current bridge, and the Anoka–Champlin Bridge was torn down to the piers and arches. A new, wider deck and support system were built. In order to keep its historic status, the ornamental concrete railing and other parts were duplicated from the old form. The bridge was reopened in 1998, and the temporary bridge was removed.

== See also ==
- List of bridges on the National Register of Historic Places in Minnesota
- List of crossings of the Upper Mississippi River
- National Register of Historic Places listings in Anoka County, Minnesota
- National Register of Historic Places listings in Hennepin County, Minnesota
