= Colonial Hall and Masonic Lodge No. 30 =

- U.S. National Register of Historic Places
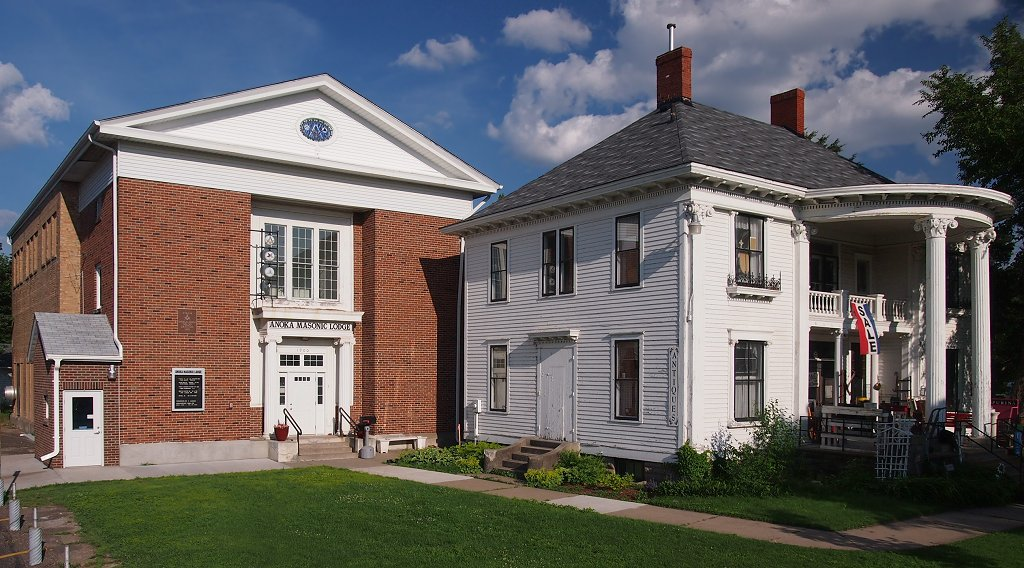
- Colonial Hall and Masonic Lodge No. 30 from the northwest

- Location within Minnesota Location within the United States
- Location: 1900 3rd Ave., S., Anoka, Minnesota
- Coordinates: 45°11′49″N 93°23′12″W
- Area: less than one acre
- Built: 1904 (Colonial Hall), 1922 (Masonic Lodge No. 30)
- Architect: Frederick Marsh
- Architectural style: Colonial Revival, Greek Revival, Georgian Revival
- NRHP reference No.: 79001182
- Added to NRHP: December 31, 1979

Colonial Hall and Masonic Lodge No. 30 consists of two historic buildings located at 1900 3rd Avenue, South in Anoka, Minnesota. Both were owned by Anoka Lodge No 30 AF & AM, which was chartered on October 25, 1859. Colonial Hall, also known as the Aldrich House for its association with the house's first owners and occupants, local medical and civil leaders Dr. Alanson and Dr. Flora Aldrich, is a two-story wooden building built in 1904 in a combination of Colonial Revival and Greek Revival styles by local renowned architect Fredrick Marsh. The Aldrich House was purchased by the Anoka Lodge in 1921, and in 1922, construction began on the present two-story redbrick Masonic temple, which is located behind but to the north of the Colonial Hall. Designed and built in the Georgian Revival style, it was completed and occupied in 1923.

On December 31, 1979, Colonial Hall and Masonic Lodge No. 30 was added to the National Register of Historic Places. In the 1980s, the Anoka County Historical Society's offices and library were housed in Colonial Hall. As of July 2019, Anoka Lodge No. 30 was still meeting in the Lodge hall twice per month, along with Anoka-Shekinah Royal Arch Chapter #104, Zabud Cryptic Council #10, Order of the Eastern Star Marthas Chapter, Job's Daughters Bethel 48, and Anoka DeMolay Chapter.

In December 2012 the decision was made to sell Colonial Hall to a private party for restoration.

In 2016, Colonial Hall is occupied by a tenant, The Big White House, an antiques store.
