= Anoka, Minnesota =

City in Minnesota, United States

- City
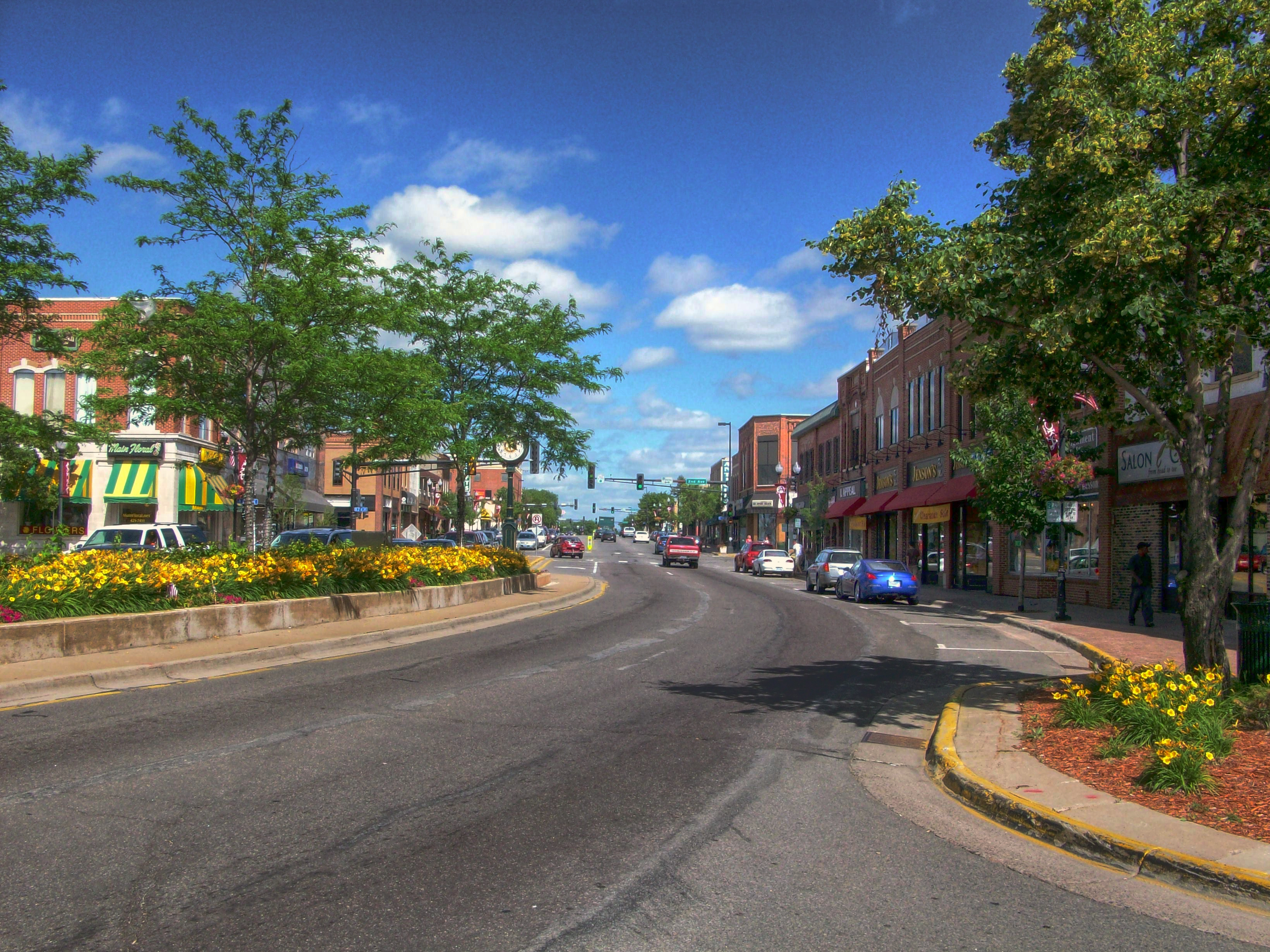
- Main Street in downtown Anoka, July 2009
- Motto: "Halloween Capital of the World"
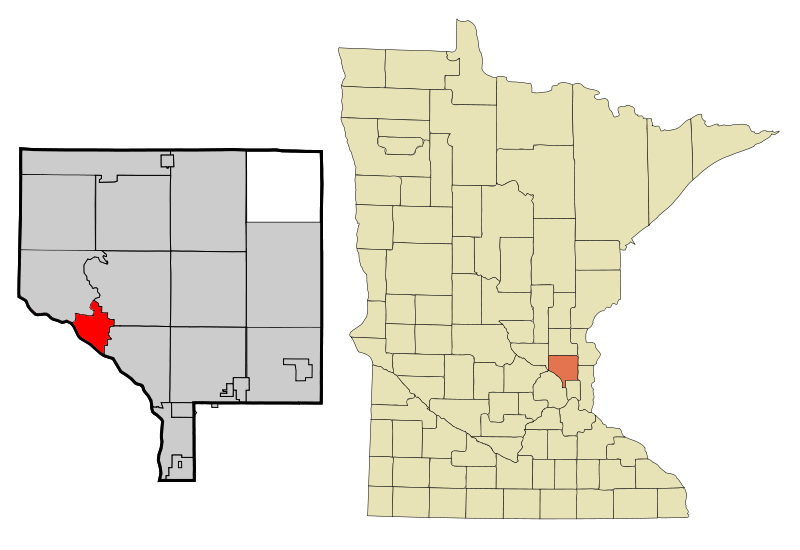
- Location of Anoka in Anoka County, Minnesota
- Coordinates: 45°11′52″N 93°23′14″W
- Country: United States
- State: Minnesota
- County: Anoka
- Founded: 1844
- Incorporated: March 2, 1878

Government
  - Mayor: Erik Skogquist

Area
  - Total: 7.18 sq mi (18.59 km^{2})
  - Land: 6.67 sq mi (17.27 km^{2})
  - Water: 0.51 sq mi (1.32 km^{2}) 7.07%
- Elevation: 876 ft (267 m)

Population (2020)
  - Total: 17,921
  - Density: 2,688/sq mi (1,038/km^{2})
- Time zone: UTC-6 (Central)
  - Summer (DST): UTC-5 (Central)
- ZIP code: 55303
- Area code: 763
- FIPS code: 27-01720
- GNIS feature ID: 639396
- Website: City of Anoka

Anoka (/əˈnoʊkə/ ə-NOH-kə) is a city in and the county seat of Anoka County, Minnesota, United States. The population was 17,921 at the 2020 census. Anoka is a northern suburb of the Twin Cities, at the confluence of the Rum and Mississippi Rivers. It is nicknamed the "Halloween Capital of the World" because in 1920 it hosted one of the first Halloween parades. It continues to celebrate the holiday each year with several parades. U.S. Highways 10 / 169 and State Highway 47 are three of Anoka's main routes, and it had a station on the Northstar Line to Minneapolis.

== History ==
Colonists first settled the site that is now Anoka in 1844. By the mid-1850s, Anoka had a school, a store and a flour mill. In 1856, C. C. Andrews called it a "large and handsome village" and noted that pine logs were floated down the Rum River to sawmills there. The city was formally incorporated in 1878. The name Anoka may derive from two Indian words. Santee Dakota used anoka, meaning "on both sides" or "from both sides", referring to its location on both banks of the Rum River. Ojibwe used anoki, meaning "I work", referring to the town's busy local lumber sites.

Anoka has a strong claim to having provided the first Union Army volunteers during the Civil War, as noted by a small plaque at the corner of West Main Street and Park Street. Alexander Ramsey, Minnesota's governor in 1861, was in Washington, D.C., when Fort Sumter was fired upon. He immediately offered a regiment to the War Department and telegraphed former governor Willis Arnold Gorman and Lieutenant Governor Ignatius L. Donnelly. Gorman, attending a district court session in Anoka, received the note by messenger from Saint Paul and called a court recess, asking for volunteers. Aaron Greenwald, who has an "island" named after him on Lake George, and five others stepped forward; Greenwald was the first to sign. He died on July 5, 1863, after sustaining a mortal wound as a member of the 1st Minnesota Infantry in defense against Pickett's Charge at the Battle of Gettysburg.

== Geography ==
Anoka lies at the confluence of the Rum and Mississippi Rivers, about 20 miles (30 km) northwest of Minneapolis. According to the United States Census Bureau, it has an area of 7.21 square miles (18.67 km^{2}), of which 6.70 square miles (17.35 km^{2}) is land and 0.51 square miles (1.32 km^{2}) is water. Adjacent communities include Dayton, Ramsey, Andover, Coon Rapids, and Champlin.

== Demographics ==
Historical population
Census	Pop.	Note	%±
1880	2,706		—
1890	4,252		57.1%
1900	3,769		−11.4%
1910	3,972		5.4%
1920	4,287		7.9%
1930	4,851		13.2%
1940	6,426		32.5%
1950	7,396		15.1%
1960	10,562		42.8%
1970	13,298		25.9%
1980	15,634		17.6%
1990	17,192		10.0%
2000	18,076		5.1%
2010	17,142		−5.2%
2020	17,921		4.5%
U.S. Decennial Census

=== 2020 census ===
As of the 2020 census, Anoka had a population of 17,921. The median age was 39.1 years. 21.1% of residents were under the age of 18 and 17.5% of residents were 65 years of age or older. For every 100 females there were 99.0 males, and for every 100 females age 18 and over there were 97.9 males age 18 and over.

100.0% of residents lived in urban areas, while 0.0% lived in rural areas.

There were 7,578 households in Anoka, of which 26.7% had children under the age of 18 living in them. Of all households, 37.8% were married-couple households, 22.6% were households with a male householder and no spouse or partner present, and 30.9% were households with a female householder and no spouse or partner present. About 34.7% of all households were made up of individuals and 13.9% had someone living alone who was 65 years of age or older.

There were 7,837 housing units, of which 3.3% were vacant. The homeowner vacancy rate was 0.5% and the rental vacancy rate was 3.7%.

Racial composition as of the 2020 census
Race	Number	Percent
White	14,201	79.2%
Black or African American	1,415	7.9%
American Indian and Alaska Native	166	0.9%
Asian	543	3.0%
Native Hawaiian and Other Pacific Islander	5	0.0%
Some other race	380	2.1%
Two or more races	1,211	6.8%
Hispanic or Latino (of any race)	849	4.7%

=== 2010 census ===
As of the census of 2010, there were 17,142 people, 7,060 households, and 4,202 families living in the city. The population density was 2,558.5 inhabitants per square mile (987.8/km^{2}). There were 7,493 housing units at an average density of 1,118.4 per square mile (431.8/km^{2}). The racial makeup of the city was 88.0% White, 4.7% African American, 1.0% Native American, 1.8% Asian, 1.6% from other races, and 3.0% from two or more races. Hispanic or Latino of any race were 4.2% of the population.

There were 7,060 households, of which 29.4% had children under the age of 18 living with them, 40.6% were married couples living together, 13.7% had a female householder with no husband present, 5.2% had a male householder with no wife present, and 40.5% were non-families. 32.2% of all households were made up of individuals, and 11.8% had someone living alone who was 65 years of age or older. The average household size was 2.34 and the average family size was 2.95.

The median age in the city was 37.6 years. 21.9% of residents were under the age of 18; 9.4% were between the ages of 18 and 24; 28.7% were from 25 to 44; 26.3% were from 45 to 64; and 13.7% were 65 years of age or older. The gender makeup of the city was 49.8% male and 50.2% female.

=== 2000 census ===
At the 2000 census, there were 18,076 people, 7,262 households and 4,408 families living in the city. The population density was 2,709.0 inhabitants per square mile (1,046.0/km^{2}). There were 7,398 housing units at an average density of 1,108.7 per square mile (428.1/km^{2}). The racial makeup of the city was 86.1% White, 4.6% African American, 0.9% Native American, 1.7% Asian, 0.01% Pacific Islander, 0.02% from other races, and 2.5% from two or more races. Hispanic or Latino of any race were 4.2% of the population.

There were 7,262 households, of which 30.9% had children under the age of 18 living with them, 44.5% were married couples living together, 12.0% had a female householder with no husband present, and 39.3% were non-families. 31.9% of all households were made up of individuals, and 11.2% had someone living alone who was 65 years of age or older. The average household size was 2.38 and the average family size was 3.03. Age was represented as: 24.6% under the age of 18, 11.1% from 18 to 24, 32.2% from 25 to 44, 20.5% from 45 to 64, and 11.6% who were 65 years of age or older. The median age was 34 years. For every 100 females, there were 99.2 males. For every 100 females age 18 and over, there were 97.1 males.

The median household income was $42,659 and the median family income was $55,311. Males had a median income of $37,930 versus $27,753 for females. The per capita income for the city was $21,367. About 4.7% of families and 6.8% of the population were below the poverty line, including 9.2% of those under age 18 and 5.4% of those age 65 or over.

== Economy ==
According to Anoka's 2010 Comprehensive Annual Financial Report, its top employers were:

#	Employer	# of Employees
1	Federal Cartridge	1,242
2	Anoka-Hennepin School District 11	1,221
3	Pentair	1,217
4	Anoka County Government Center	1,140
5	Anoka Metro Regional Treatment Center	479
6	Wells Fargo	373
7	Anoka Technical College	324
8	DecoPac, Inc.	300
9	Mate Precision Tooling	300
10	Firestone Building Products	201

== Arts and culture ==
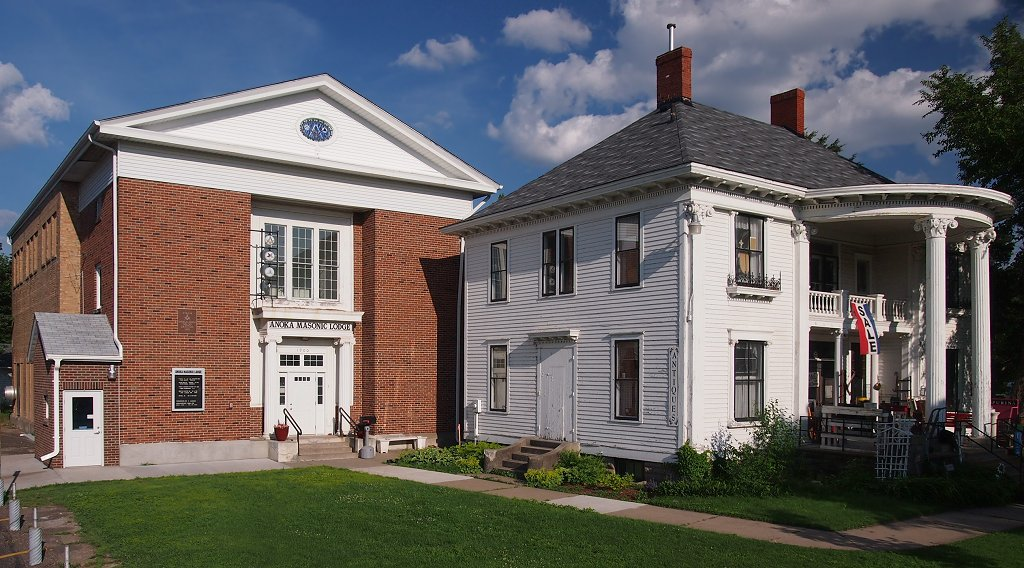
Colonial Hall and Masonic Lodge No. 30

- Anoka County Historical Society
- Anoka Metro Regional Treatment Center
- Anoka County Library
- Castle Field
- Goodrich Field
- Peninsula Point Two Rivers Historical Park
- Anoka–Champlin Mississippi River Bridge
- Windego Park Auditorium/Open Air Theater
- Anoka Nature Preserve
- Greenhaven Golf Course
- Anoka Aquatic Center
- Colonial Hall and Masonic Lodge No. 30
- Lyric Arts Theater

== Government ==
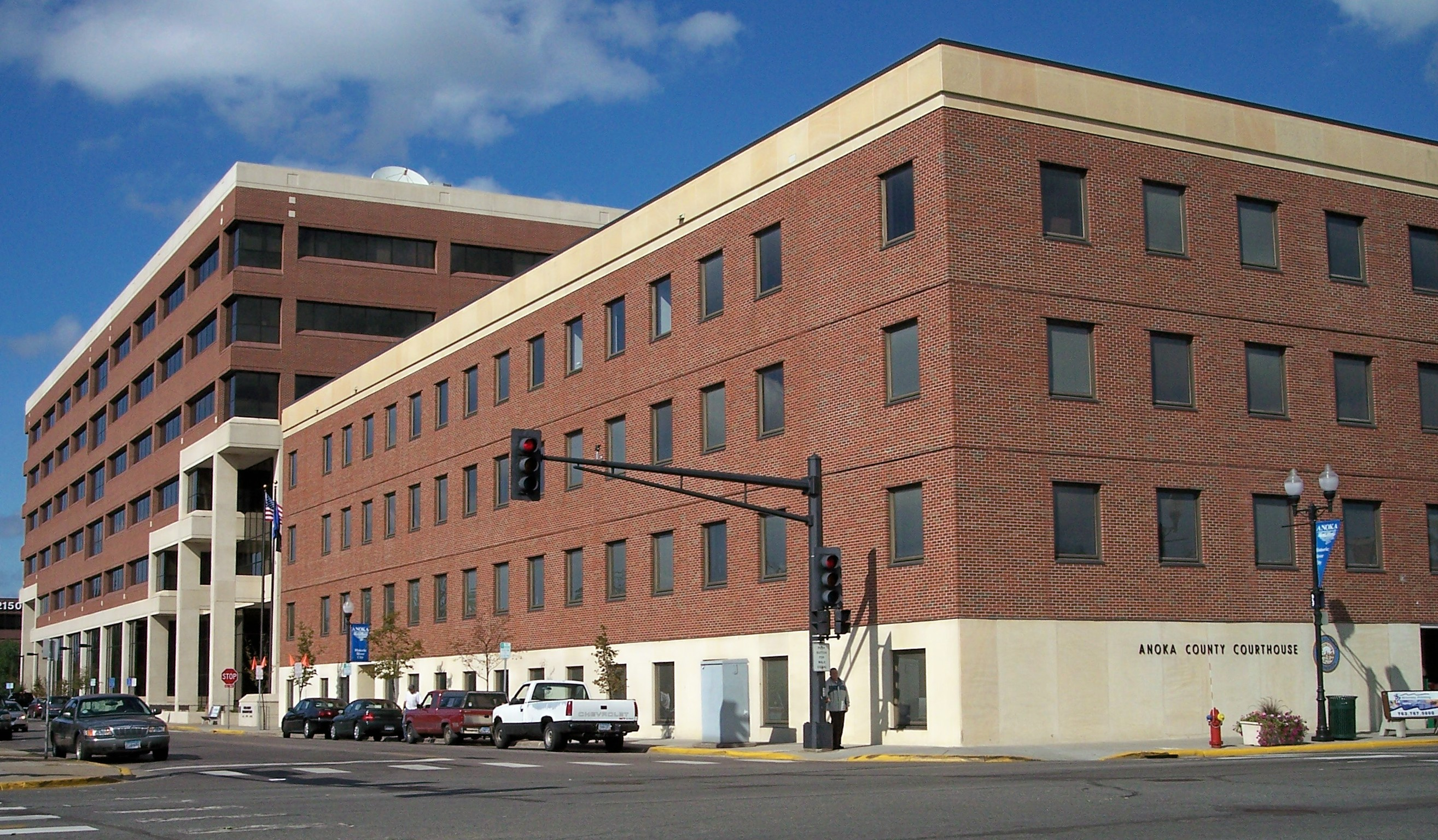
Anoka County Courthouse

In 2000, Anoka elected 22-year-old Bjorn Skogquist as mayor. He was reelected in 2002, 2004, and 2006. Skogquist was the second-youngest mayor ever elected in Minnesota (a year older than John Gibeau, who was elected mayor of Ceylon in 1998). He worked for open government, code reform, and protection of historic housing and open space, and encouraged young people to become involved in civics.

Presidential election results 1992–2020

Precinct General Election Results
Year	Republican	Democratic	Third parties
2024	47.5% 4,559	49.9% 4,782	2.6% 247
2020	47.0% 4,496	49.8% 4,768	3.2% 308
2016	47.1% 4,075	42.5% 3,677	10.4% 904
2012	45.8% 4,076	51.2% 4,555	3.0% 267
2008	46.8% 4,167	50.7% 4,518	2.5% 220
2004	50.5% 4,523	48.3% 4,322	1.2% 103
2000	46.1% 3,778	46.7% 3,828	7.2% 588
1996	33.3% 2,526	51.9% 3,938	14.8% 1,119
1992	32.8% 2,796	40.7% 3,472	26.5% 2,257

== Education ==
Higher education institutions in Anoka include Anoka Technical College. One of the two main Anoka-Ramsey Community College campuses is in neighboring Coon Rapids.

Most Anoka elementary and secondary students attend schools in Anoka-Hennepin School District 11. District 11 secondary schools in Anoka are Anoka High School and Secondary Technical Education Program or S.T.E.P. High School. The middle school is Anoka Middle School for the Arts, formerly known as Fred Moore Middle School for the Performing Arts. It has two campuses: Fred Moore Campus (formerly Fred Moore Middle School for the Performing Arts), and Washington Campus (formerly Washington Elementary School). Anoka's District 11 elementary schools are Franklin Elementary School, Lincoln Elementary School, and Wilson Elementary School. District 11 is Minnesota's largest school district and includes parts of 12 other municipalities. Some students attend public schools in other districts chosen by their families under Minnesota's open enrollment statute. Some students come from places such as Brooklyn Park under the NWISD Magnet Program.

Anoka has several private schools for all ages, including St. Stephens Catholic School.

== Sports ==
Anoka High School competes in the Northwest Suburban Conference in the Minnesota State High School League. The school mascot is the Tornadoes. They have won 25 state tournaments in their history.

Anoka is also home to two baseball teams, the Anoka Bucs and the Minnoka Grays. Jim Lundeen started the Ham Lake Bucs in 1980. The team was officially approved by the Eastern Minney League and moved to Anoka in 1982. The Bucs' first official game was played in May 1983. The Bucs have been to five straight MBA state tournaments (2019-2023). The Minnoka Grays play in the Federal League, which is for men 35 and older. The Grays won Class AAA in 2023, 2024, and 2025, and won the last 35+ Minnesota state tournament in 2023 and the 2023 MSBL World Series in Arizona, recognizing them as the 35+ national champions. In 2024 the Grays reached the championship game again and lost to Houston. The Bucs and Grays play home games at Castle Field during the summer.

== Transportation ==
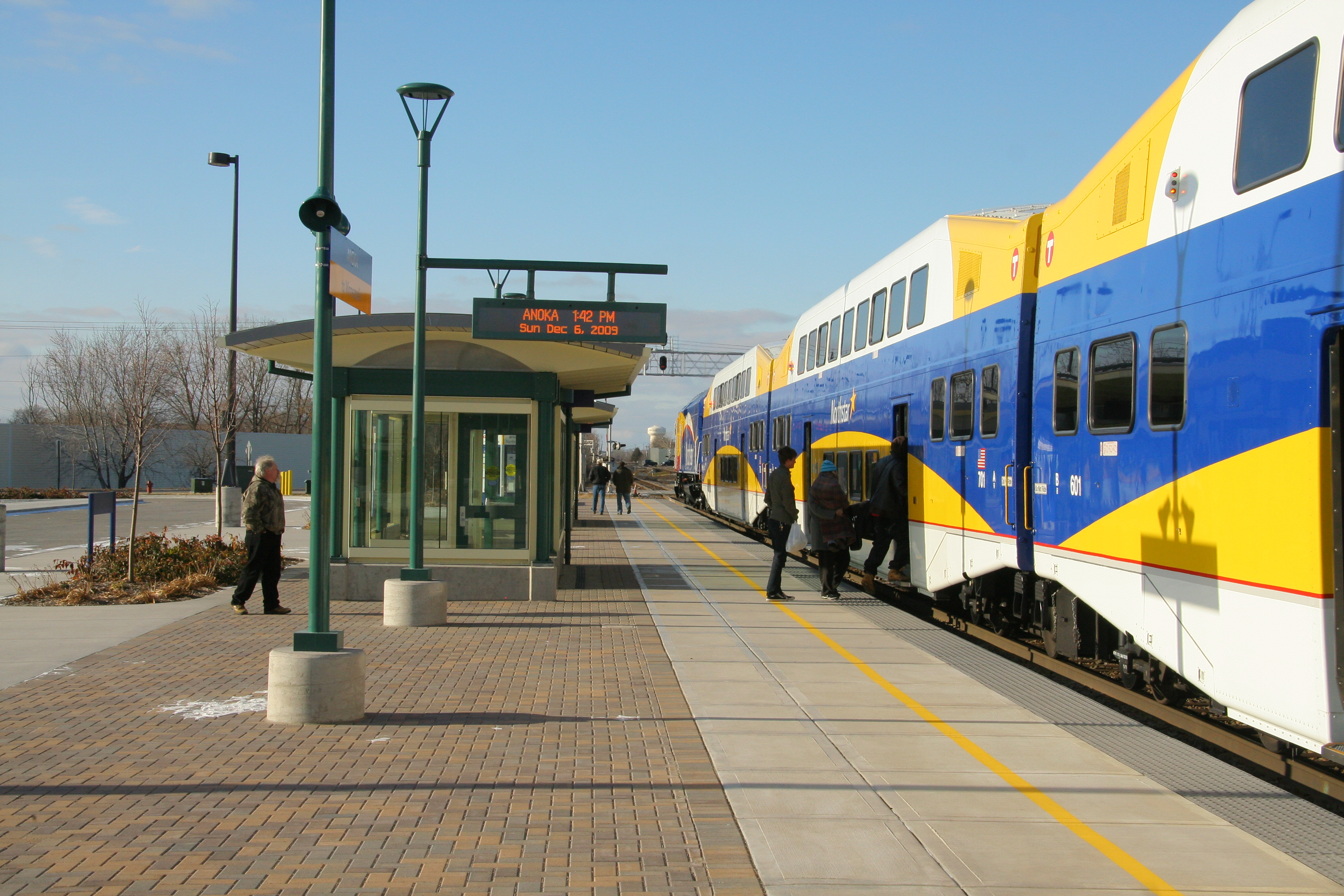
Northstar Line commuter train at Anoka station

U.S. Highways 10 / 169 and State Highway 47 are three of Anoka's main routes. Anoka station was on the Northstar Line to Minneapolis, which opened in 2009 and closed in 2026, replaced by a bus service.

== Notable people ==
- Flora Aldrich, physician and writer
- Stub Allison, college football coach
- Dale Arnold, sportscaster, resided in Anoka
- Michele Bachmann, U.S. Representative from Minnesota's 6th District, raised in Anoka and graduated from Anoka High School in 1974
- Theodora Bean, American journalist and suffragist
- Gretchen Carlson, former Fox News Channel anchor, 1989's Miss America, and celebrity spokesperson for March of Dimes
- Larry Constantine, computer software pioneer and author, raised in Anoka and graduated from Anoka High School in 1961
- Jake Deitchler, Olympic wrestler, graduated from Anoka High School in 2008
- James C. Frost, Minnesota State Representative; the first sheriff of Anoka County, Minnesota
- Herbert Funk Goodrich, a former judge on the United States Court of Appeals for the Third Circuit, born in Anoka
- Anna Arnold Hedgeman, first African American to earn a B.A. from Hamline University and first African American woman to hold a New York mayoral cabinet position
- Garrison Keillor, author and host of A Prairie Home Companion, born in Anoka and graduated from Anoka High School
- Ernest A. Larsen, Minnesota state legislator and educator
- Tom Mangan, Minnesota state legislator and educator
- Steve Nelson, professional football player
- Brandon Paulson, U.S. Olympic wrestler, graduated from Anoka High School in 1992
- Briana Scurry, United States women's national soccer team goalie, graduated from Anoka High School in 1990
- Sean Sherk, former UFC lightweight champion
- Richard K. Sorenson, master sergeant, USMC, awarded the Medal of Honor for his heroism in the Marshall Islands in 1944. Rick Sorenson Park in Anoka is named for him.
- Matt Sorteberg, professional hockey player
- Robert Stewart Sparks, Los Angeles city council member
- Bill Tuttle, Major League Baseball player
- Dick Wildung, professional football player

== See also ==
- Anoka–Champlin Mississippi River Bridge
- Federal Cartridge
- List of Minnesota placenames of Native American origin
