= Itasca =

Itasca is a word coined by Henry Schoolcraft and may refer to:

- Lake Itasca, the source of the Mississippi River

== Places in the United States ==
- Itasca County, Minnesota
- Itasca Township, Clearwater County, Minnesota
- Itasca Township, Sherman County, Kansas
- Itasca State Park, Minnesota
- Itasca, Illinois
  - Itasca station
- Itasca, Texas
- Itasca Village, a former settlement in Anoka County, Minnesota
- South Itasca, Wisconsin
- Itascatown, a historical settlement on Howland Island named after the United States Coast Guard Cutter Itasca (see below)
- Itaska Street (St. Louis), a road in St. Louis, Missouri

== Ships in the United States ==
- USCGC Itasca (1929), a United States Coast Guard cutter in commission from 1930 to 1941 and from 1946 to 1950, famous for her role during the disappearance of Amelia Earhart in 1937
- USS Itasca, the name of more than one United States Navy ship

== Other ==
- Itasca Phasar, a brand of recreational vehicles produced by Winnebago Industries
- Itasca, the pseudonym of American musician Kayla Cohen, who released the 2024 album Imitation of War
