= Ramsey, Minnesota =

City in Minnesota, United States

Ramsey
- City
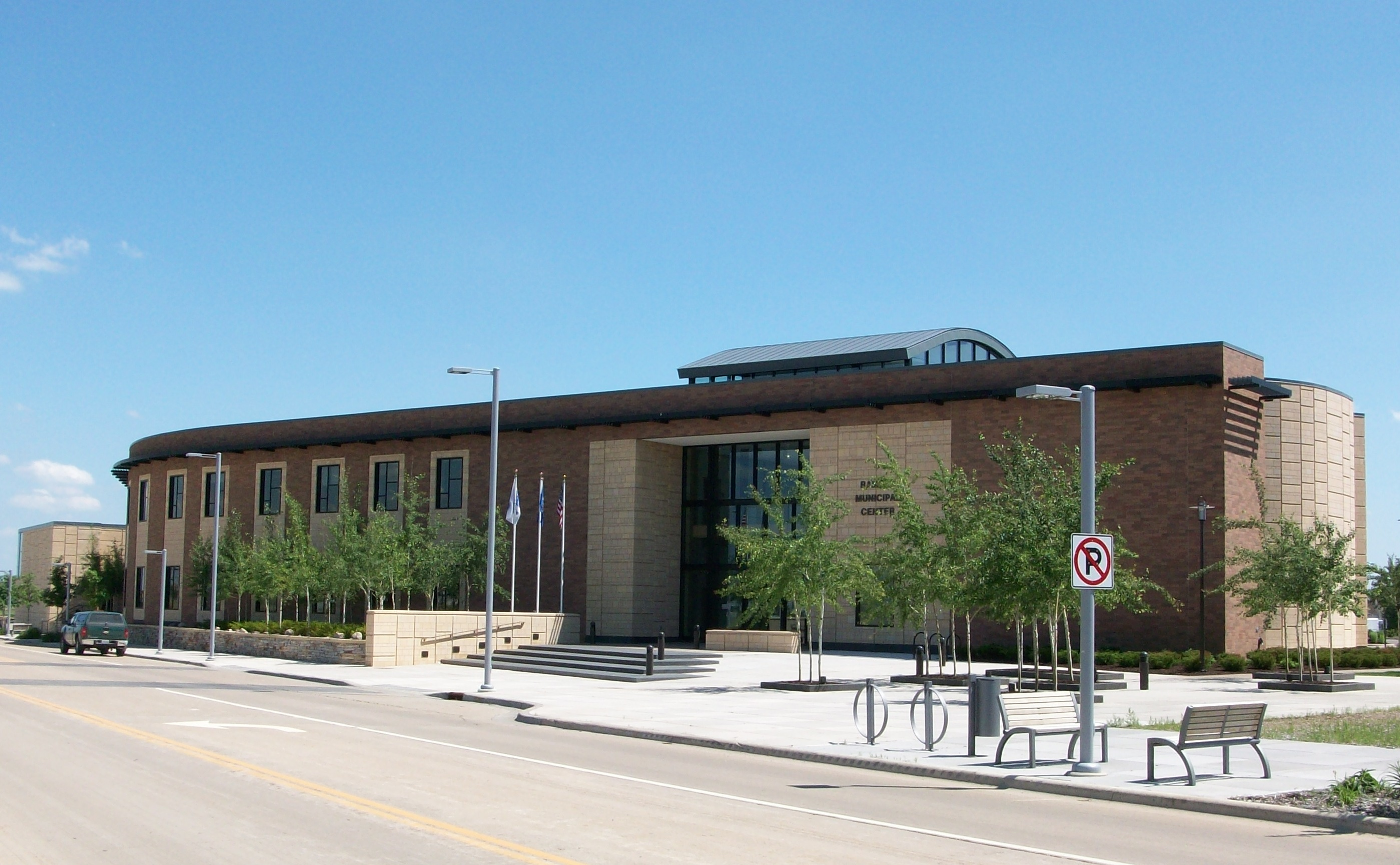
- Ramsey Municipal Center, June 2009

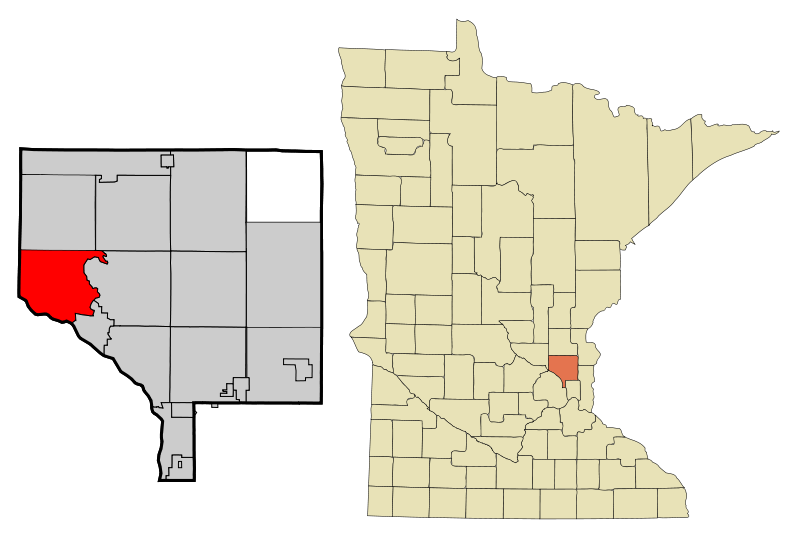
- Location of the city of Ramsey within Anoka County, Minnesota
- Coordinates: 45°15′39″N 93°26′33″W
- Country: United States
- State: Minnesota
- County: Anoka
- Founded: 1850
- Incorporated: November 12, 1974

Government
  - Mayor: Ryan Heineman

Area
  - Total: 29.84 sq mi (77.28 km^{2})
  - Land: 28.86 sq mi (74.74 km^{2})
  - Water: 0.98 sq mi (2.55 km^{2})
- Elevation: 883 ft (269 m)

Population (2020)
  - Total: 27,646
  - Estimate (2022): 28,333
  - Density: 958.1/sq mi (369.91/km^{2})
- Time zone: UTC-6 (Central)
  - Summer (DST): UTC-5 (CDT)
- ZIP code: 55303
- Area code: 763
- FIPS code: 27-53026
- GNIS feature ID: 2396311
- Website: www.cityoframseymn.gov

Ramsey is a suburban city 22 miles (35 km) north-northwest of downtown Minneapolis in Anoka County, Minnesota, United States. The population was 27,646 at the 2020 census. It is a northwest suburb of the Twin Cities.

U.S. Highways 10 / 169 (co-signed) and State Highway 47 are two of the main routes, and Ramsey had a station on the Northstar Commuter Rail line to downtown Minneapolis.

== History ==
The first settlers in Ramsey were Thomas A. Holmes and James Beatty, who built the Old Log Trading Post in 1849. Itasca Village was platted in 1852. The village contained the first post office in Anoka County and a station on the Northern Pacific Railroad. Itasca Village was abandoned soon after the removal of the Winnebago Indians in the area. In 1857 the first township, Watertown, was created. It was later renamed Dover, and then Ramsey. Ramsey was incorporated on November 12, 1974, with a population of about 8,000 people.

== Geography ==
According to the United States Census Bureau, the city has an area of 29.79 square miles (77.16 km^{2}), of which 28.81 square miles (74.62 km^{2}) is land and 0.98 square miles (2.54 km^{2}) is water. Ramsey borders the cities of Andover, Anoka, Nowthen, Oak Grove, Dayton, and Elk River.

== Demographics ==
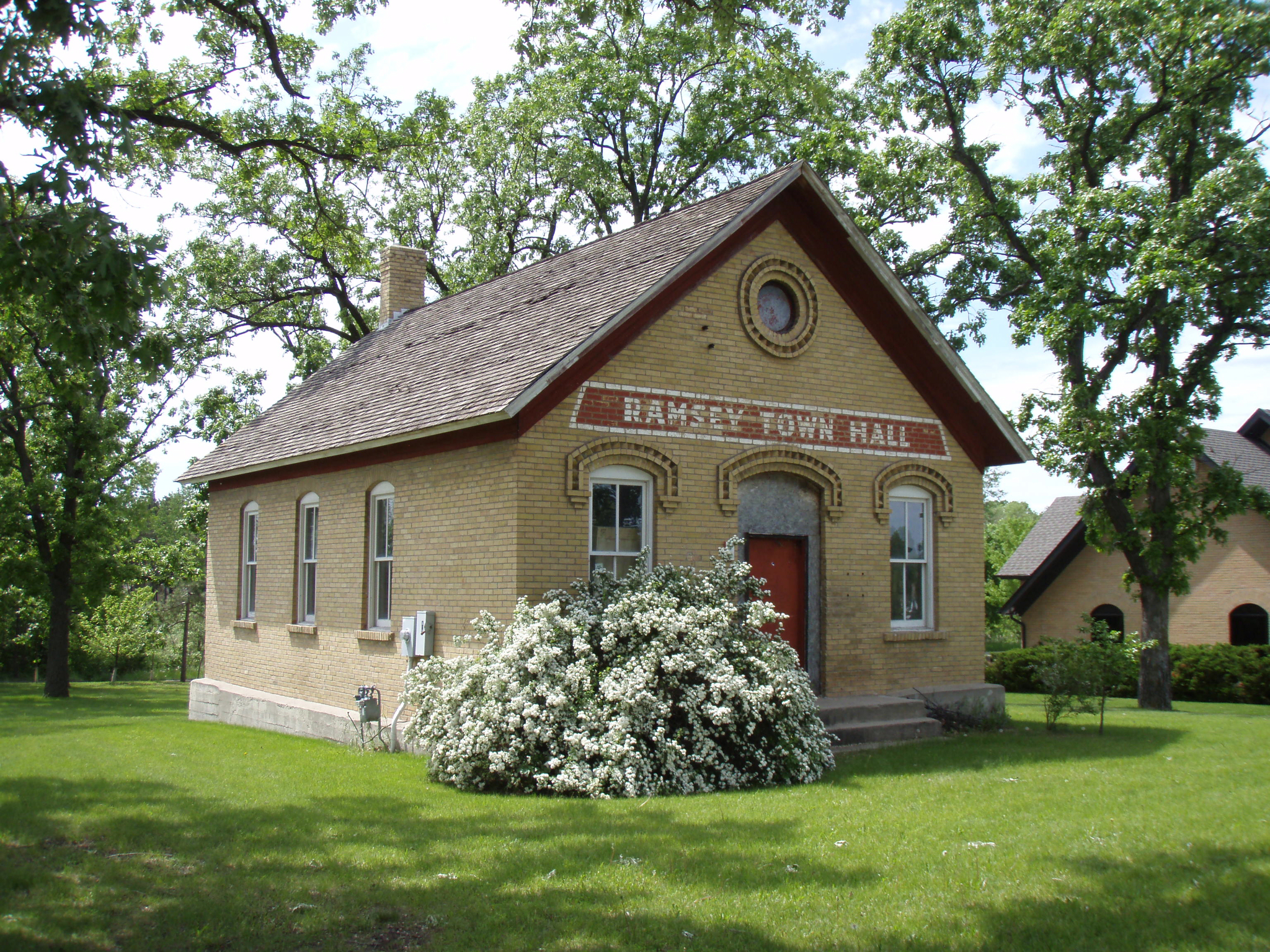
District No. 28 School, later the Ramsey Town Hall, is listed on the National Register of Historic Places.

Historical population
Census	Pop.	Note	%±
1860	192		—
1870	265		38.0%
1880	387		46.0%
1890	398		2.8%
1900	490		23.1%
1910	601		22.7%
1920	609		1.3%
1930	522		−14.3%
1940	583		11.7%
1950	670		14.9%
1960	1,179		76.0%
1970	2,536		115.1%
1980	10,093		298.0%
1990	12,408		22.9%
2000	18,510		49.2%
2010	23,668		27.9%
2020	27,646		16.8%
2022 (est.)	28,333		2.5%
U.S. Decennial Census; 2020 Census

=== 2020 census ===
As of the 2020 census, Ramsey had a population of 27,646. The median age was 37.1 years. 26.1% of residents were under the age of 18 and 12.2% of residents were 65 years of age or older. For every 100 females there were 100.4 males, and for every 100 females age 18 and over there were 99.6 males age 18 and over.

86.5% of residents lived in urban areas, while 13.5% lived in rural areas.

There were 9,591 households in Ramsey, of which 38.0% had children under the age of 18 living in them. Of all households, 62.2% were married-couple households, 13.3% were households with a male householder and no spouse or partner present, and 16.8% were households with a female householder and no spouse or partner present. About 15.7% of all households were made up of individuals and 5.5% had someone living alone who was 65 years of age or older.

There were 9,947 housing units, of which 3.6% were vacant. The homeowner vacancy rate was 0.8% and the rental vacancy rate was 13.5%.

Racial composition as of the 2020 census
Race	Number	Percent
White	22,876	82.7%
Black or African American	1,799	6.5%
American Indian and Alaska Native	100	0.4%
Asian	881	3.2%
Native Hawaiian and Other Pacific Islander	7	0.0%
Some other race	419	1.5%
Two or more races	1,564	5.7%
Hispanic or Latino (of any race)	966	3.5%

=== 2010 census ===
As of the census of 2010, there were 23,668 people, 8,033 households, and 6,484 families living in the city. The population density was 821.5 inhabitants per square mile (317.2/km^{2}). There were 8,302 housing units at an average density of 288.2 per square mile (111.3/km^{2}). The racial makeup of the city was 91.8% White, 2.8% African American, 0.4% Native American, 2.4% Asian, 0.8% from other races, and 1.7% from two or more races. Hispanic or Latino of any race were 2.4% of the population.

There were 8,033 households, of which 43.9% had children under the age of 18 living with them, 67.6% were married couples living together, 8.5% had a female householder with no husband present, 4.6% had a male householder with no wife present, and 19.3% were non-families. 13.7% of all households were made up of individuals, and 3% had someone living alone who was 65 years of age or older. The average household size was 2.95 and the average family size was 3.24.

The median age in the city was 34.9 years. 28.7% of residents were under the age of 18; 7.8% were between the ages of 18 and 24; 29.4% were from 25 to 44; 27.4% were from 45 to 64; and 6.7% were 65 years of age or older. The gender makeup of the city was 50.3% male and 49.7% female.

=== 2000 census ===
As of the census of 2000, there were 18,510 people, 5,906 households, and 5,102 families living in the city. The population density was 642.9 inhabitants per square mile (248.2/km^{2}). There were 5,946 housing units at an average density of 206.5 per square mile (79.7/km^{2}). The racial makeup of the city was 96.80% White, 0.31% African American, 0.45% Native American, 0.01% Asian, 0.01% Pacific Islander, 0.28% from other races, and 1.15% from two or more races. Hispanic or Latino of any race were 1.19% of the population.

There were 5,906 households, out of which 49.6% had children under the age of 18 living with them, 76.8% were married couples living together, 6.1% had a female householder with no husband present, and 13.6% were non-families. 8.8% of all households were made up of individuals, and 1.4% had someone living alone who was 65 years of age or older. The average household size was 3.13 and the average family size was 3.33.

In the city, the population was spread out, with 32.1% under the age of 18, 7.1% from 18 to 24, 35.5% from 25 to 44, 22.6% from 45 to 64, and 2.8% who were 65 years of age or older. The median age was 32 years. For every 100 females, there were 106.1 males. For every 100 females age 18 and over, there were 106.9 males.

The median income for a household in the city was $68,988, and the median income for a family was $70,926. Males had a median income of $43,898 versus $31,212 for females. The per capita income for the city was $26,057. About 1.3% of families and 1.6% of the population were below the poverty line, including 2.1% of those under age 18 and none of those age 65 or over.

== Government ==
The mayor of Ramsey is Ryan Heineman. He was elected in 2024. Sarah Strommen served as mayor from 2012–2018.

== Schools ==
Ramsey is in the Elk River and Anoka-Hennepin public school districts. PACT Charter School is a charter school inside of Ramsey. In 2023 they expanded into an elementary building and a secondary building.

== Infrastructure ==
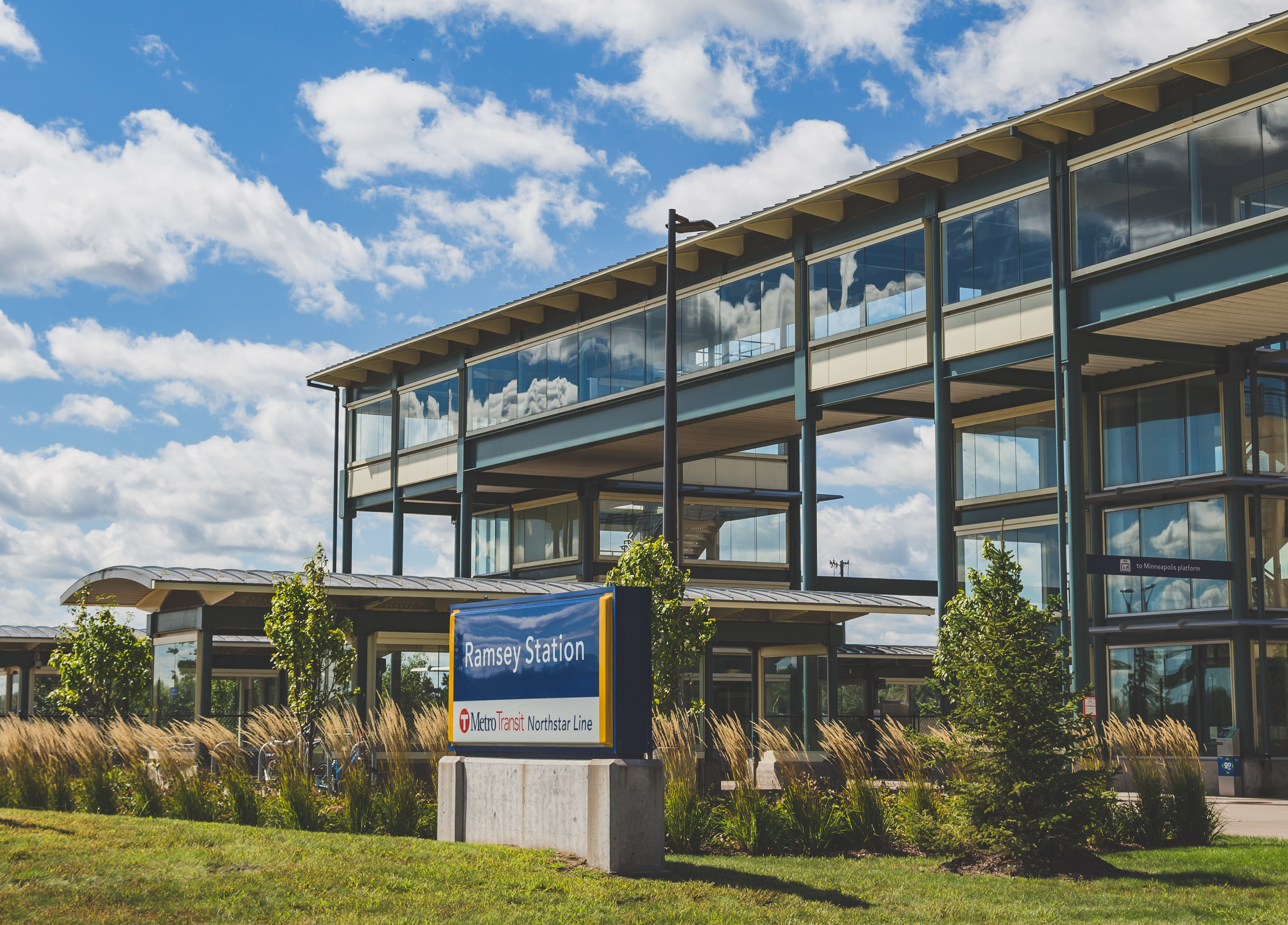
Ramsey station on the Northstar Line

=== Transportation ===
U.S. Highways 10 / 169 and State Highway 47 are three of Ramsey's main routes, and it had a station on the Northstar Commuter Rail line to Minneapolis, which opened in 2012 and closed in early 2026. The line has been replaced by a bus service.
