= Senator Merriam =

Senator Merriam may refer to:

- Eugene R. Merriam (born 1944), Minnesota State Senate
- Frank Merriam (1865–1955), California State Senate
