= Sarah Strommen =

American public official

- Strommen in 2026

Minnesota Department of Natural Resources Commissioner
- Incumbent
- Assumed office January 7, 2019
- Appointed by: Tim Walz
- Preceded by: Tom Landwehr; Dave Schad (acting)

Assistant Minnesota Department of Natural Resources Commissioner
- In office 2015 – January 7, 2019
- Succeeded by: Barb Naramore

Mayor of Ramsey, Minnesota
- In office 2012 – May 2018
- Succeeded by: John LeTourneau

Personal details
- Born: 1973 St. Paul, Minnesota
- Education: Grinnell College; Duke University

Sarah Strommen (née Rosenberg) (born 1973) is an American public official currently serving as the Minnesota Department of Natural Resources (DNR) Commissioner. She previously served in elected office as mayor of Ramsey, Minnesota

== Career ==
=== Political career ===
Strommen was elected onto the city council of Ramsey, Minnesota, and was elected mayor in 2012. She was the first woman to be elected to that post. During her time as mayor, her biggest achievement was the construction of a highway interchange. The interchange was one of many infrastructure project planned but left unbuilt in the north metro. Strommen was able to collaborate with other local government, such as Coon Rapids, to create a unified infrastructure plan to the legislature, which was approved.

In 2012, she became a member of the Minnesota Board of Soil and Water Resources. In 2015, she left the board to join the Minnesota DNR as Assistant Commissioner, where she headed the Fish and Wildlife and Parks and Trails divisions. In 2018, she resigned as mayor to focus on her work in the DNR.

=== As DNR Commissioner ===
Strommen served as Assistant Minnesota DNR Commissioner from 2015 to 2019. In 2019, she was appointed as DNR Commissioner by Tim Walz. Walz chose Strommen due to her experience as a Liberal mayor in a city usually conservative. Strommen's appointment was not officially confirmed by the state legislature until July 2021. Upon taking office, She stated her priorities were the restoration of trout populations, and the cleanup of the St. Louis River, protecting water quality and availability for agriculture, and fighting invasive species. She leads annual public roundtables. In 2026, the roundtable's major issues addressed included the spread of ticks, shoreline protections, the use of sonar in fishing, and the use of drones in hunting.

Strommen has been the subject of public pressure to block the construction of the Twin Metals mine. When asked about the mining proposal in 2019, Strommen did not promise to approve or block the mine's construction, stating that the mine would be subject to a robust environmental review and public input.

Strommen was involved in directing the fighting of the 2026 Minnesota wildfires. In August of 2026, Strommen stated that the DNR would not cooperate with the federal government with the construction of mines in the Rainy River watershed, with an exception of comment on environmental impact. It is unknown of Strommen will continue in her cabinet position, or if incoming governor Amy Klobuchar will appoint her successor.
