= Natural history of Minnesota =

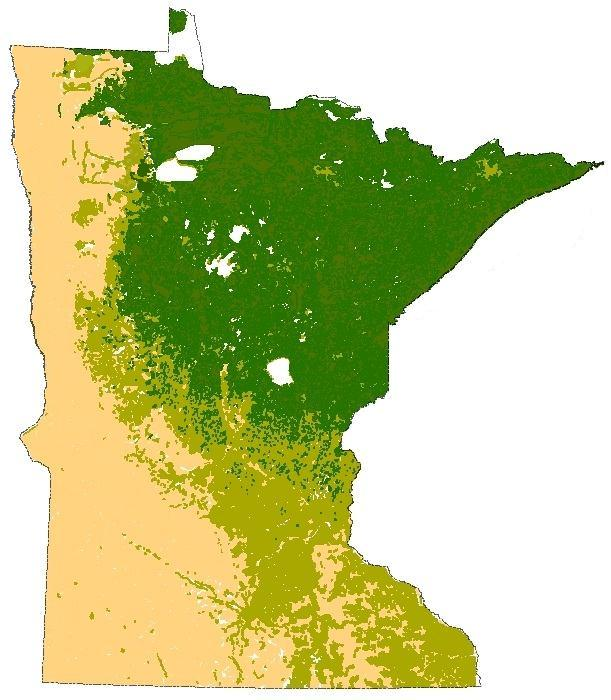
The terrestrial biomes of Minnesota, prior to European settlement. Tallgrass aspen parkland/prairie grasslands in yellow, eastern deciduous forest in olive green, and the northern coniferous forest in dark green.

The natural history of Minnesota covers the plant and animal species of the U.S. state of Minnesota. The continental climate and location of Minnesota at the physiographic intersection of the Laurentian and the Interior Plains influences its plant and animal life. Three of North America's biomes converge in Minnesota: prairie grasslands in the southwestern and western parts of the state, the eastern temperate deciduous forests in the east-central and the southeast, and the coniferous forest in the north-central and northeast.

== Ecoregions ==
An ecoregion is an area uniquely defined by environmental conditions and natural features. Ecoregions in Minnesota were largely influenced by the unique glacial history, geology, soil type, land use, and climate of the state. The United States Environmental Protection Agency, Minnesota Department of Natural Resources, and World Wildlife Fund maintain separate classifications of the state's ecoregions. Although different, they generally agree on delineating between the coniferous forest in the north-central portion and the Arrowhead, a temperate deciduous forest in the central and southeast, and the tallgrass prairie in the southern and western portions of the state. The northern coniferous forests are a vast wilderness of pine and spruce trees mixed with patchy stands of birch and poplar.

== Flora ==
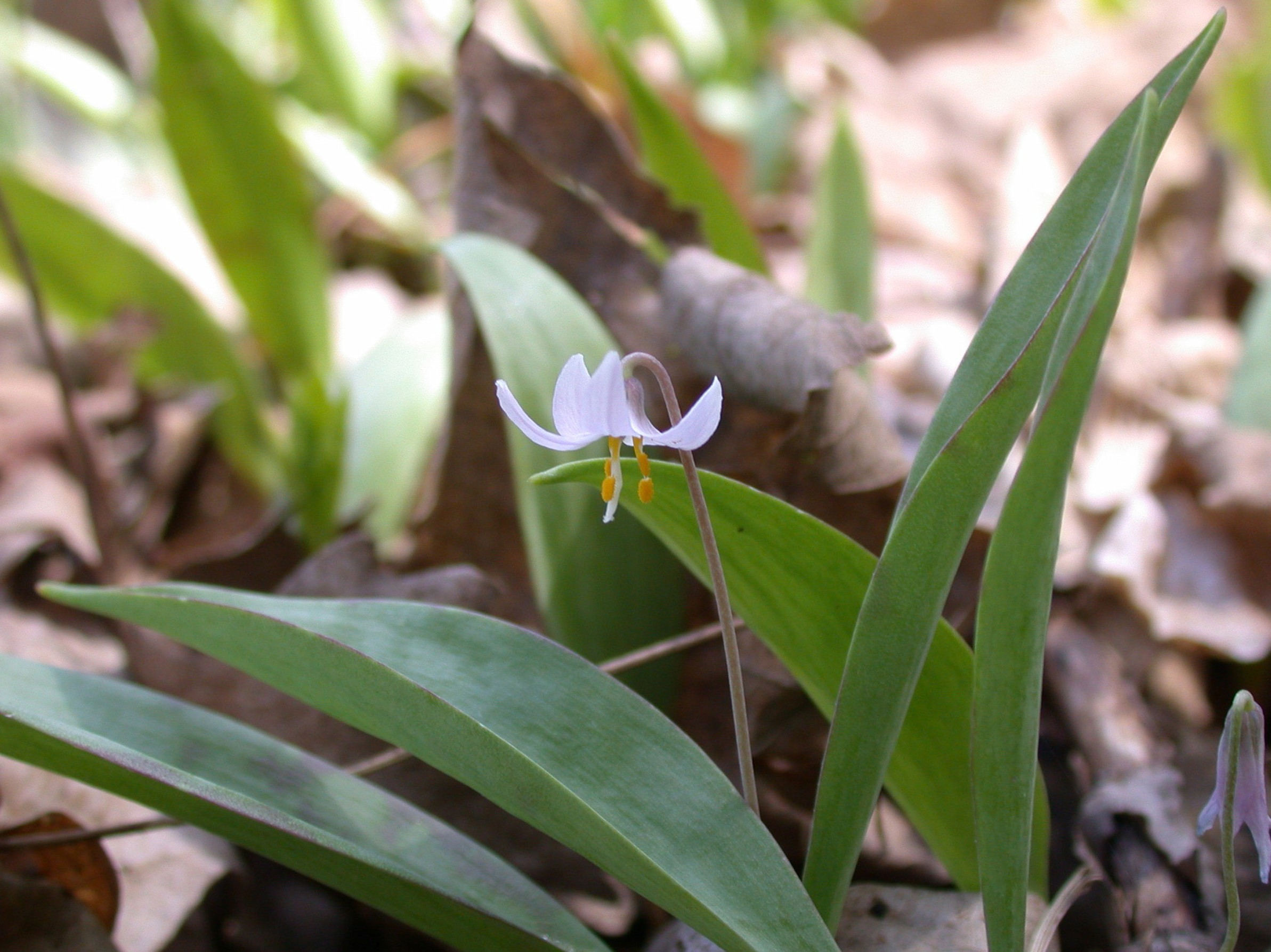
Dwarf trout lily

Much of Minnesota's northern forest has been logged, leaving only a few patches of old-growth forest today in areas such as in the Chippewa National Forest and the Superior National Forest where the Boundary Waters Canoe Area Wilderness has some 400,000 acres (1,600 km^{2}) of unlogged land. Although logging continues, regrowth keeps about one third of the state forested.

Flora listed as threatened on the United States Fish and Wildlife Service list of endangered species include the Prairie bush-clover (Lespedeza leptostachya), the Western Prairie Fringed Orchid (Platanthera praeclara), and Leedy's roseroot (Rhodiola integrifolia ssp. leedyi), and the Dwarf trout lily (Erythronium propullans).

== Fauna ==
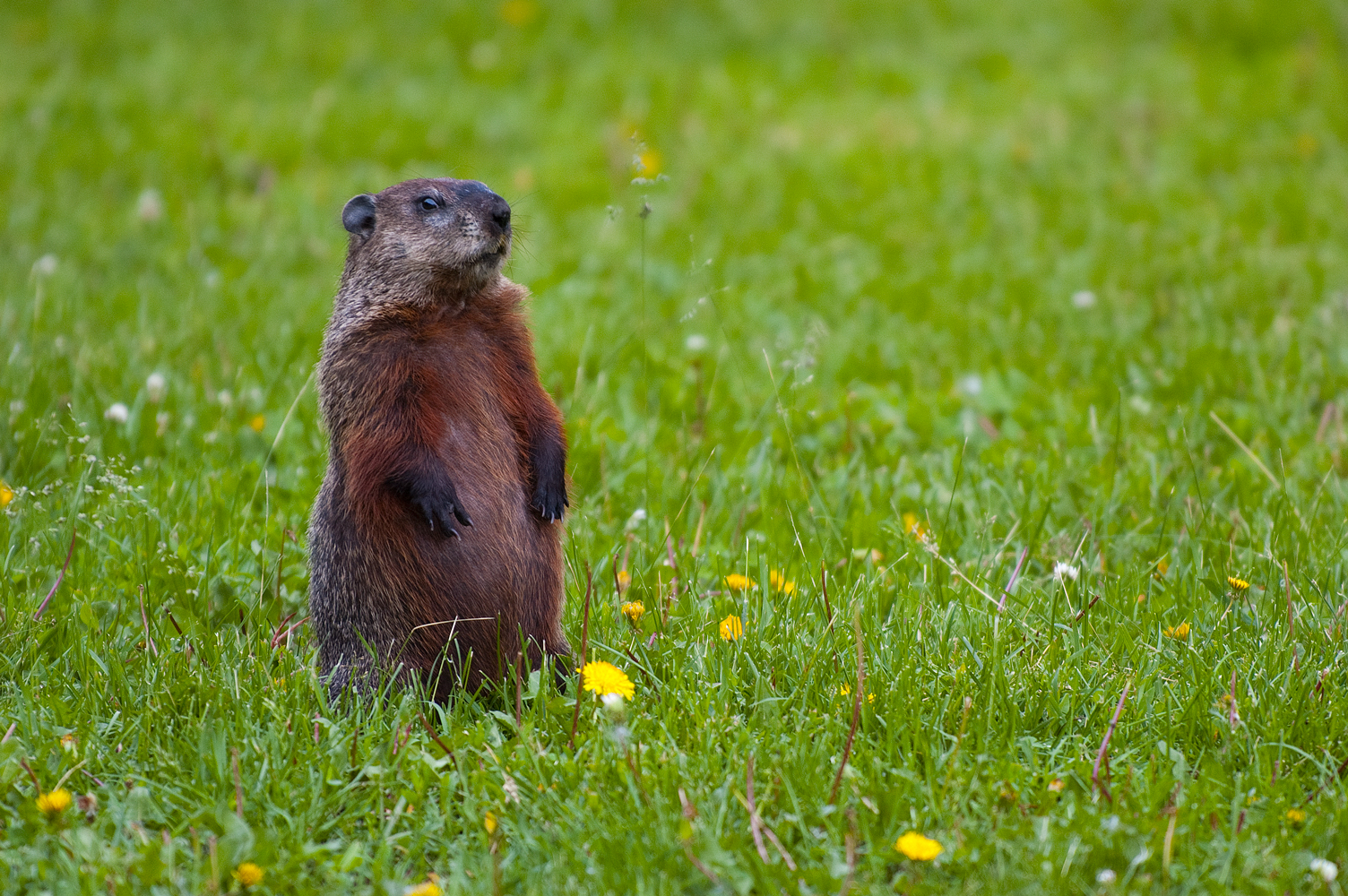
A groundhog seen in Minneapolis, along the banks of the Mississippi River

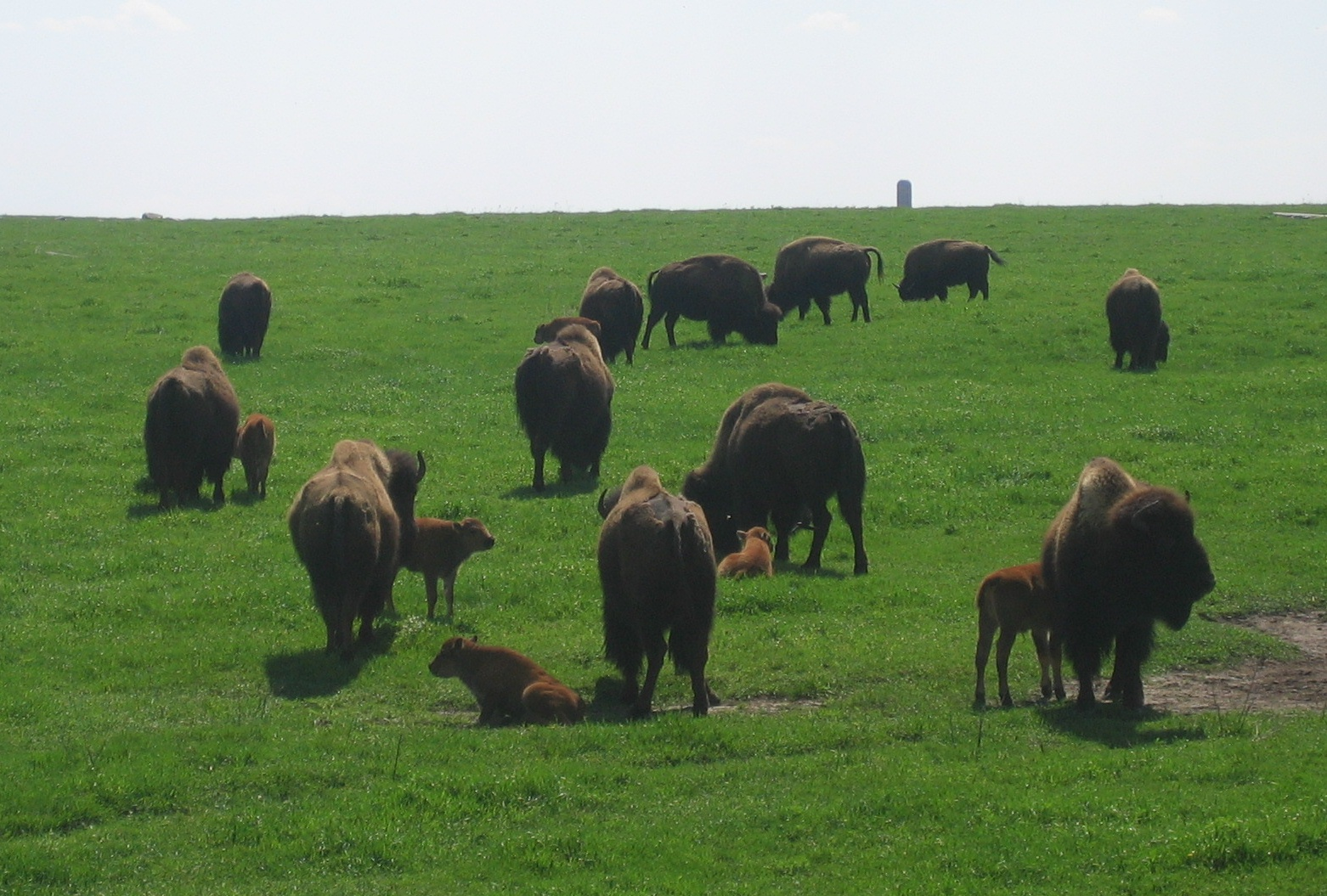
Bison at Blue Mounds State Park in the southwestern corner of Minnesota

Historic (and modern) loss of habitat, as well as overharvesting, has affected some native mammals to the point of extirpation, including the bison (disappeared in the mid-1800s; the last bison was reported in southwest Minnesota in 1879; a non-wild population exists in Blue Mounds State Park), cougar (though vagrant individuals are becoming more common), wolverine, and the boreal woodland caribou (extirpated from all the Lower 48). White-tailed deer and bobcats thrive; the state has the nation's largest population of wolves (specifically Great Lakes wolves) outside of Alaska, and also supports healthy populations of black bears, elk, Canada lynx, American martens, fishers, and moose.

Located on the Mississippi Flyway, Minnesota hosts migratory waterfowl such as geese and ducks, and game birds such as grouse, pheasants, and turkeys. It is home to the largest population of bald eagles in the contiguous United States following a large increase in conservation efforts and breeding areas since 1989, with an estimated 30 active nests in the Twin Cities alone. The red-tailed hawk thrives in Minnesota woodlands, swamps, and prairies, where rodent populations are high. Although they do not nest in the state, snowy owls migrate to Minnesota from the arctic tundra to hunt voles, mice, and rabbits. The number of snowy owls in the state in any given winter depends greatly on the winter conditions of the snowy owl's natural habitat, in areas such as Canada and Alaska.

The state fish, the walleye, is found in all parts of Minnesota. The walleye fishing season begins on the second Saturday of May, the time of year when the fish begin spawning. Walleye are especially active on cloudy days and after sunset, as well as during the autumn, when they feed heavily to prepare for winter. They naturally reproduce in 260 lakes throughout the state, and are stocked in 1,300 other lakes by the Minnesota Department of Natural Resources. The lakes contain other sport fish such as smallmouth and largemouth bass, muskellunge, and northern pike, and streams in the southeast are populated by brook, brown, and rainbow trout.
