= Minnesota Department of Natural Resources =

State government agency in Minnesota, United States

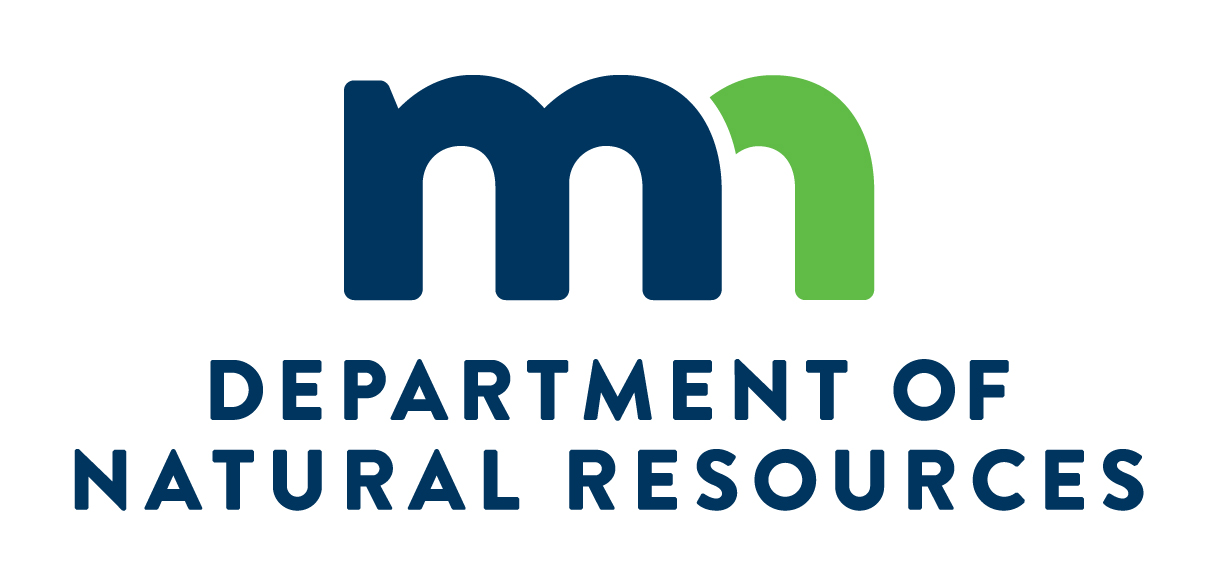
- Minnesota DNR official logo

Agency overview
- Type: Natural resources, parks and recreation, forestry, wildlife, and fisheries management; conservation law enforcement agency.
- Jurisdiction: State of Minnesota
- Headquarters: 500 Lafayette Road, Saint Paul, Minnesota 55155; 44.5722°N 93.0502°W
- Employees: 3,000+ (2018)
- Annual budget: $1.1 billion (2018-19)
- Agency executives: Sarah Strommen, Commissioner; Barbara Naramore, Deputy Commissioner
- Child agencies: Ecological and Water Resources; Enforcement; Fish and Wildlife; Forestry; Lands and Minerals; Parks and Trails
- Website: dnr.state.mn.us

Map
- MN DNR Jurisdiction highlighting State of Minnesota in the United States.

The Minnesota Department of Natural Resources, or Minnesota DNR, is the agency of the U.S. state of Minnesota charged with conserving and managing the state's natural resources. The agency maintains areas such as state parks, state forests, recreational trails, and recreation areas as well as managing minerals, wildlife, and forestry throughout the state. The agency is divided into six divisions - Ecological & Water Resources, Enforcement, Fish & Wildlife, Forestry, Lands & Minerals, and Parks & Trails.

== History ==
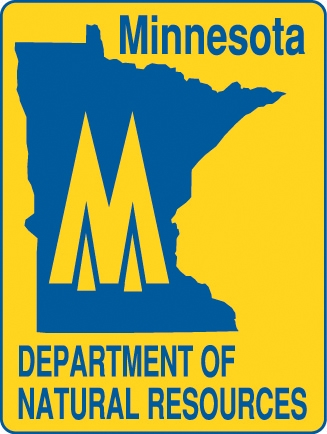
Minnesota Department of Natural Resources former logo used until 2017.

Efforts to conserve Minnesota's wildlife began as early as 1876, with a forestry association established to protect the state's timber resources. However, those efforts became futile as the industry took over and people sought the money that could be made on the land. Over time, there were other attempts to control the destruction of resources, but most only had effects on what was done to public land, such as the Land Commission established in 1885. In 1911 the Minnesota Division of Forestry was established to conserve the state's forests by promoting fire prevention and protection.

Minnesota's state bird the common loon

In 1931, the Minnesota Legislature consolidated the management of natural resources under the newly found Minnesota Department of Conservation.

When the Department of Conservation was created, it brought together four separate state entities: forestry, game and fish, drainage and waters, and lands and timber, while adding a division of state parks and a tourist bureau as well. The Great Depression was an important time for the Department of Conservation. Federal unemployment programs such as the Civilian Conservation Corps and the Works Progress Administration provided labor to construct buildings, clear trails, and plant trees. Many of the buildings in Minnesota's state parks were built during this period.

In 1971 the name of the agency was changed to the Department of Natural Resources to "better reflect its broader responsibilities." More sections of the Minnesota Government were added to the department and many of the division names changed. Old policies were replaced with new and more prevalent ones geared towards issues associated with an increase in state land use.

== Divisions ==
=== Ecological and Water Resources ===
The Division of Ecological and Water Resources studies the ecosystems within Minnesota. They analyze the information in order to understand how the ecosystems function, how they benefit the citizens of Minnesota, how they are impacted by human use, and what long-term effects will take place on the health of the ecosystems. The division is involved in locating and protecting endangered and threatened species, as well as the habitats that are vital to the conservation of those species.

Another part of the division's responsibilities is in managing threats against the ecosystem. These threats include: harmful invasive species, fish and wildlife diseases, and the negative impact human development can have on the environment. Every year, the Department of Natural Resources is required to prepare a report about invasive species for the Legislature.

One of the largest programs that the Division of Ecological Resources is in charge of is Minnesota's Nongame Wildlife Program, which focuses on the conservation of species that are not hunted. This would include trumpeter swans, bald eagles and Minnesota's state bird, the common loon. The division is also accountable for all lakes, rivers and streams, wetlands, and ground waters within the state. The division enforces permits implemented to protect and preserve Minnesota's water resources. The program works on observing the effects of climate on the water resources and analyzes the data in order to understand and address the impact the climate has on the Minnesota's wildlife and its citizens.

=== Enforcement ===
As the name implies, the division focuses on the enforcement of Minnesota's natural resource laws. Originally part of the Fish and Game Division, the Enforcement Division's goal has not changed much: keep the public safe. Conservation Officers employed by this division enforce laws regarding hunting, fishing, trapping, recreational vehicles, State Parks and wild rice harvesting. A second focus is educating the public about safety. Classes are taught by trained volunteers and are often related to the enforced laws. The division also enforces air and water quality laws.

=== Fish and Wildlife ===
The Division of Fish and Wildlife was part of the original Department of Conservation. Originally called the Fish and Game Division, it was created to manage, protect and regulate the state's fish and wildlife resource. They also disperse licenses and recreational vehicle registrations throughout Minnesota.

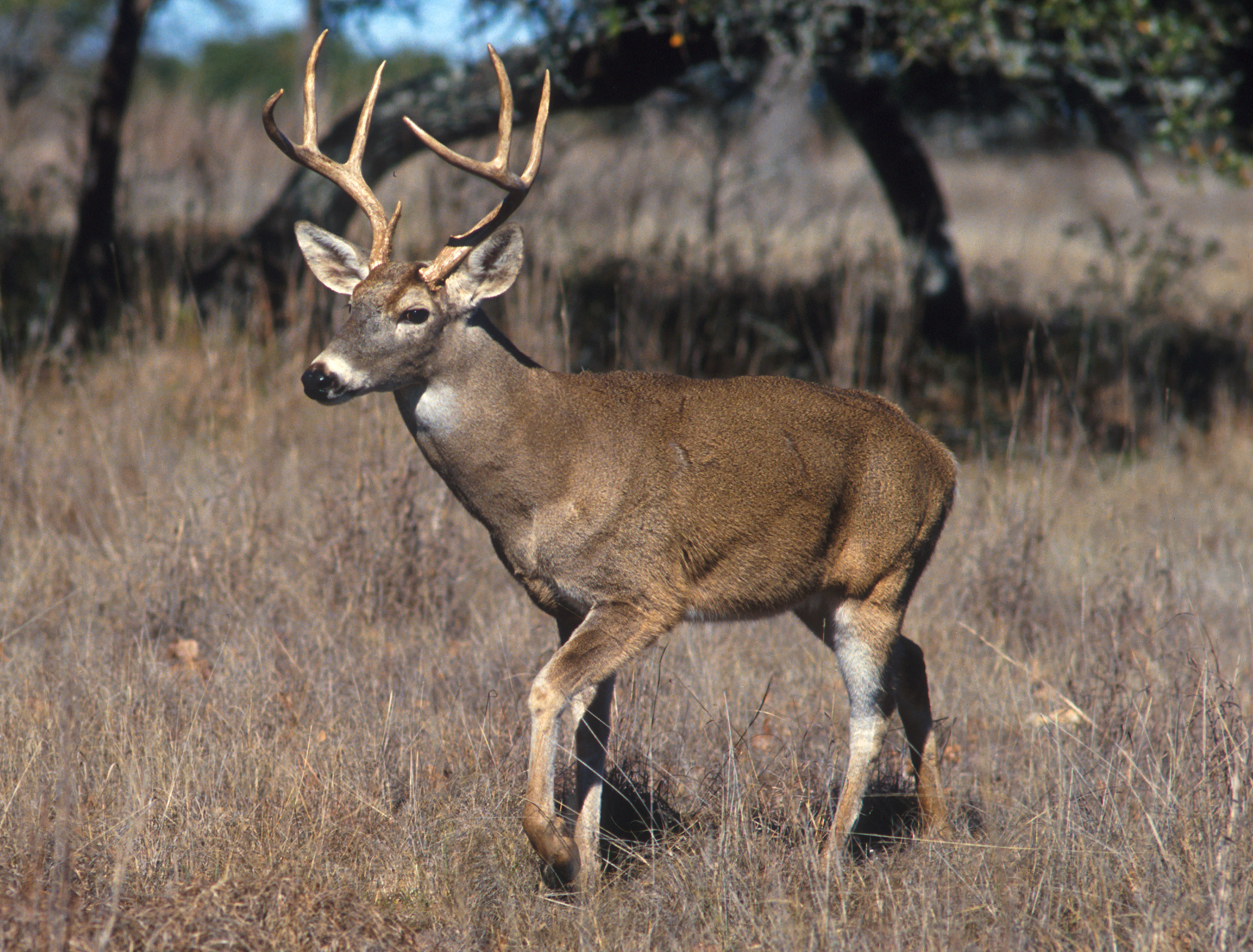
White-tailed deer are found throughout the state

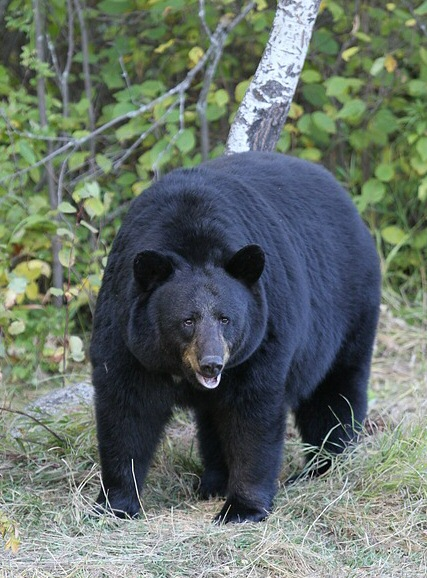
American black bear is found in the northern part of the state

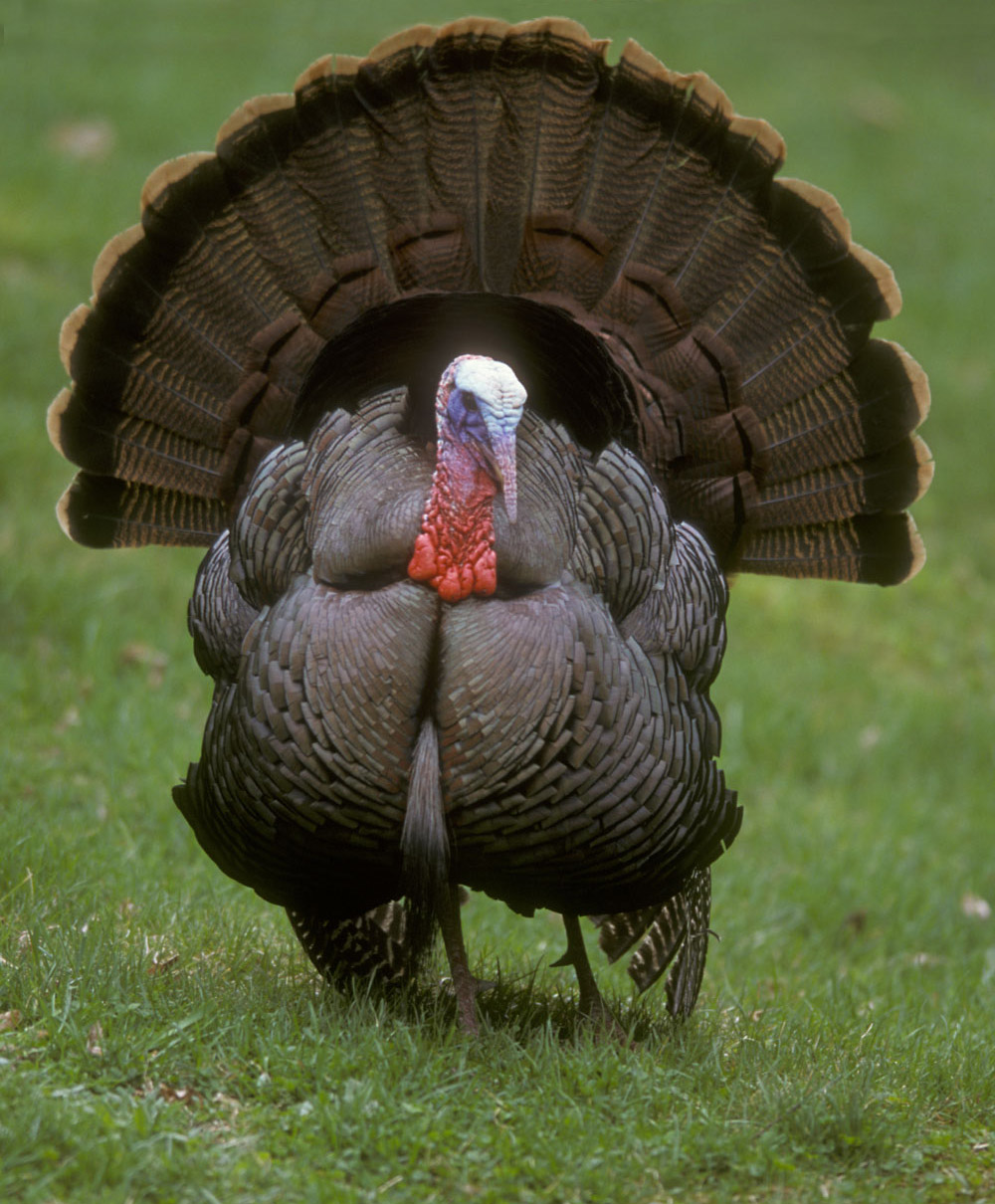
Wild turkey can be found throughout the state

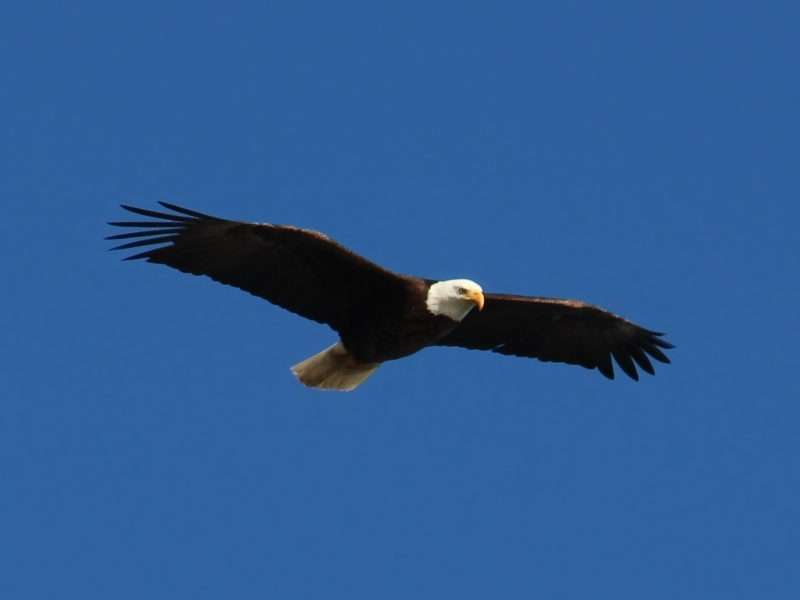
Bald eagle in flight

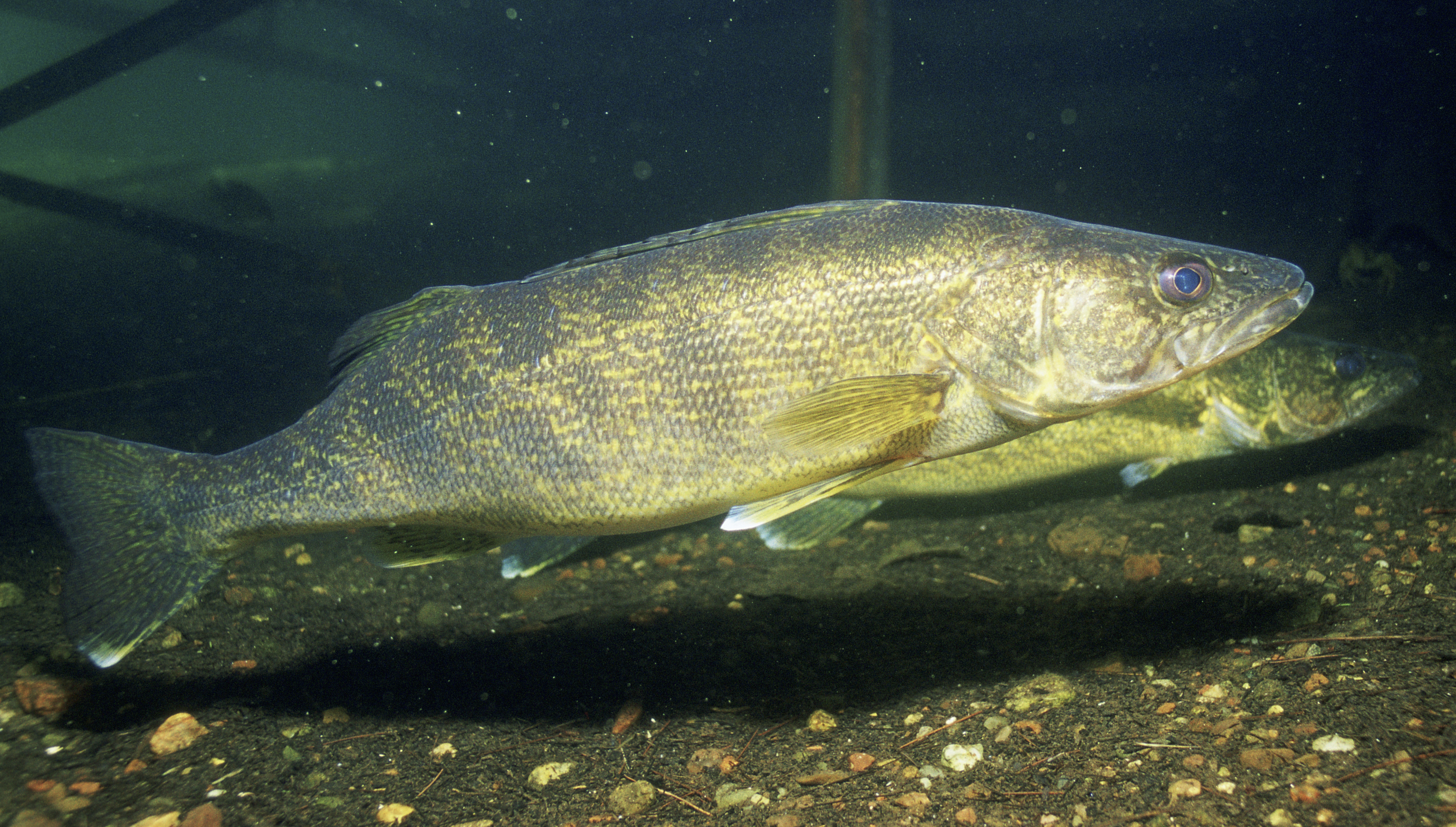
Walleye, the state fish is popular with anglers

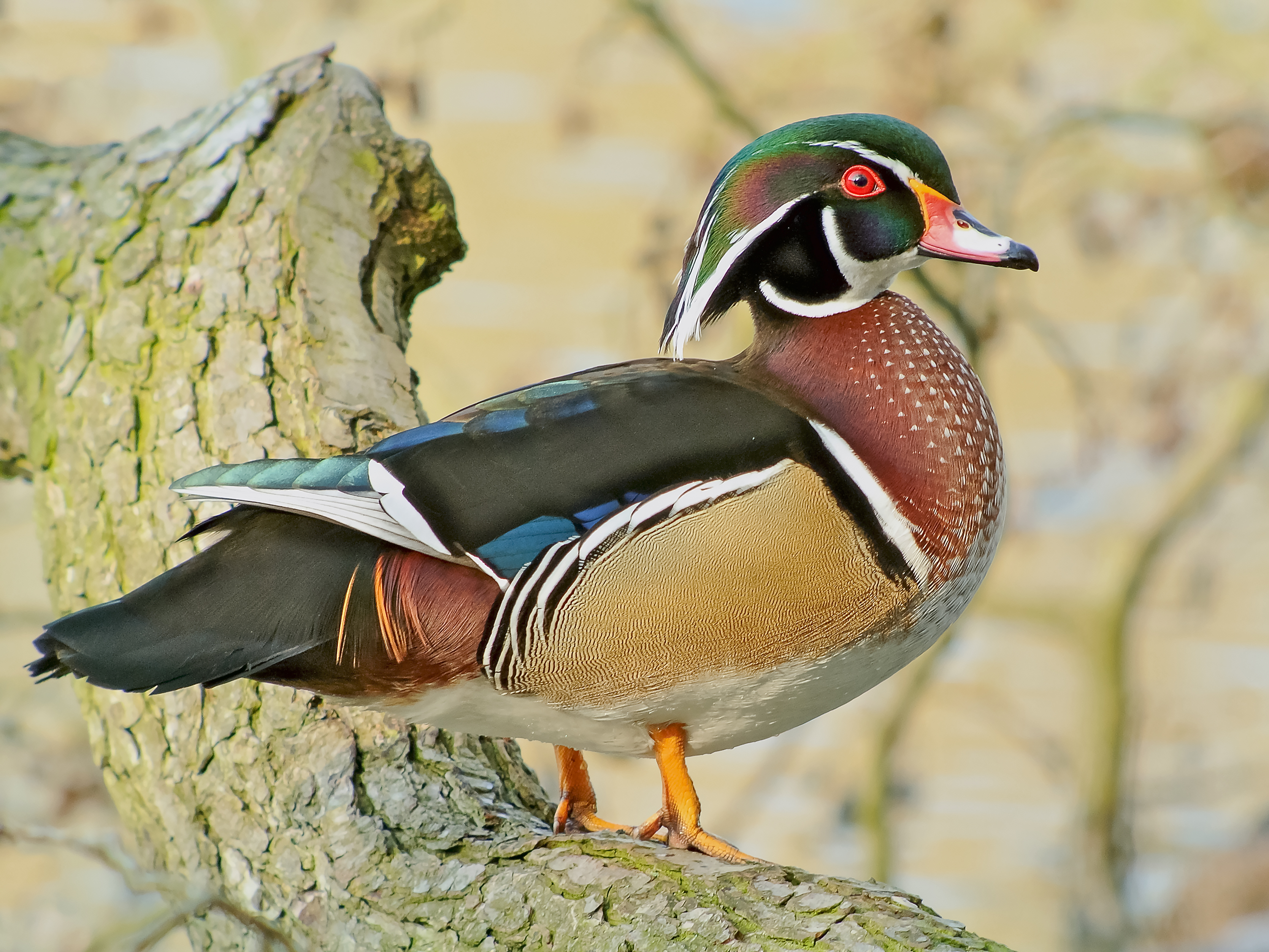
Wood duck can be found in many woods and wetlands across the state

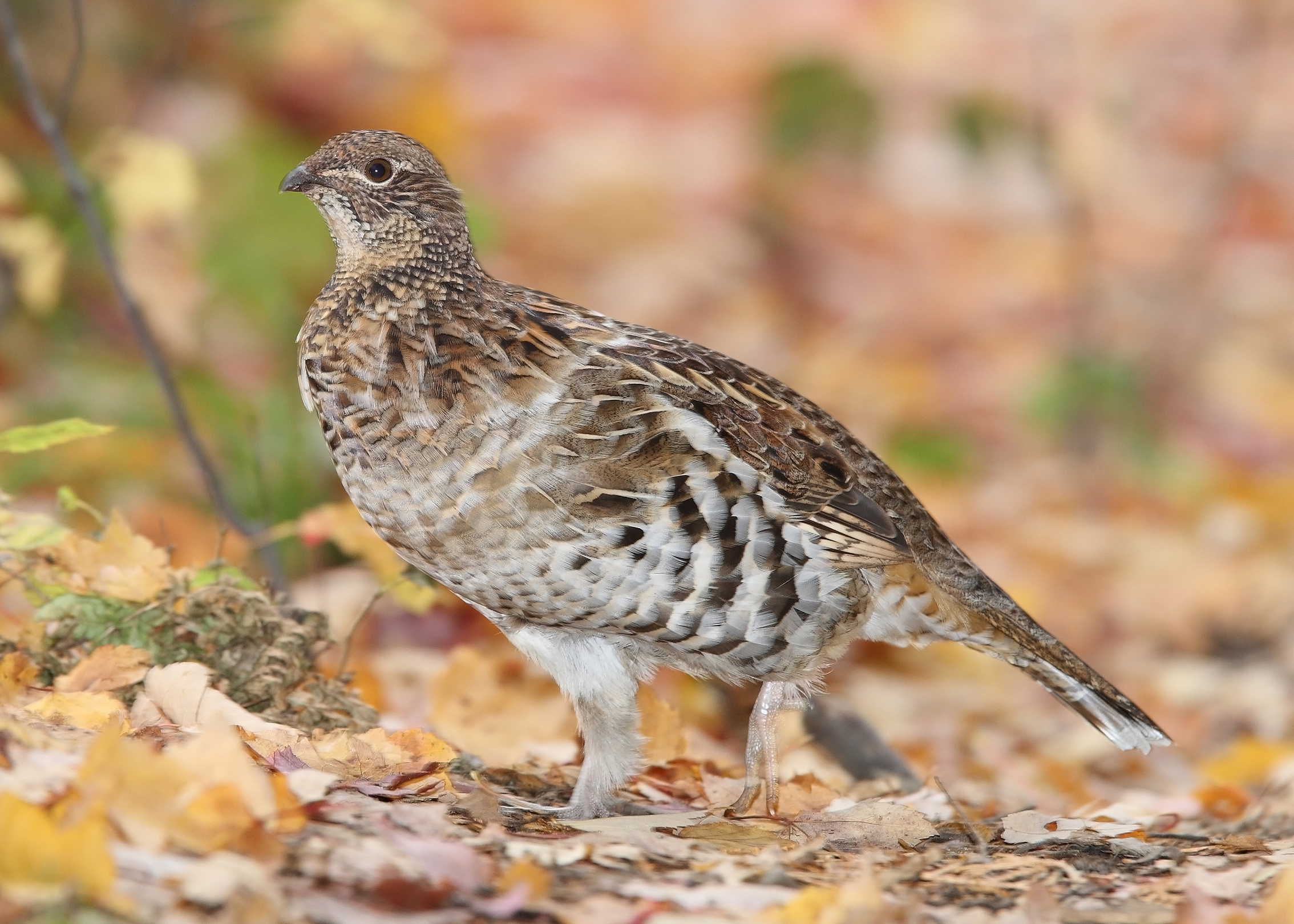
Ruffed grouse, found in northeastern Minnesota

=== Forestry ===
The Division of Forestry was founded in 1911 as the Minnesota Forest Service, predating the Department of Natural Resources and its predecessor Department of Conservation. The mission of the Division of Forestry is to maintain healthy forests. This is done through cooperative forest management, fire management, and state land management. Cooperative management with private land owners vary and are carried out by the Forest Stewardship Program.

Woodland Stewardship Plans

=== Parks and Trails ===
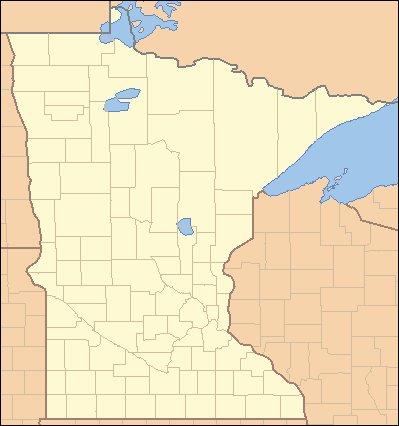
Map of State Parks of Minnesota
Hold cursor over locations to display park name;
click to go to park article.

The Parks and Trails Division was part of the Minnesota Forestry Service until it was given its own division in the Department of Conservation in 1935. The Division of Parks and Trails has three major goals. The first being to preserve both natural and cultural resources in Minnesota. The second comes in educating visitors. The third goal is to support opportunities for visitors to enjoy recreational activities in the parks, without causing damage to the wildlife, so people will be able to appreciate the resources for generations. The division takes part in publishing individual water access maps by county, individual state trail maps, snowmobile trail maps, off-highway vehicle trail maps, Lake Superior kayak trail maps as well as maps of rivers within Minnesota for boaters and canoeists.

The Parks and Trails Division manages 76 state park and recreation areas, 56 primitive campgrounds within Minnesota State Forests, 35 designated state water trails (totalling over 4,500 miles), over 3,000 public water accesses, over 1,300 miles of state trails (600 miles of paved trails), and over 300 fishing piers throughout the state. Itasca State Park is the second-oldest state park in the U.S., established in 1891 and contains the headwaters of the Mississippi River. The largest state park in size is the 33,895 acre (13,717 ha) Saint Croix State Park.

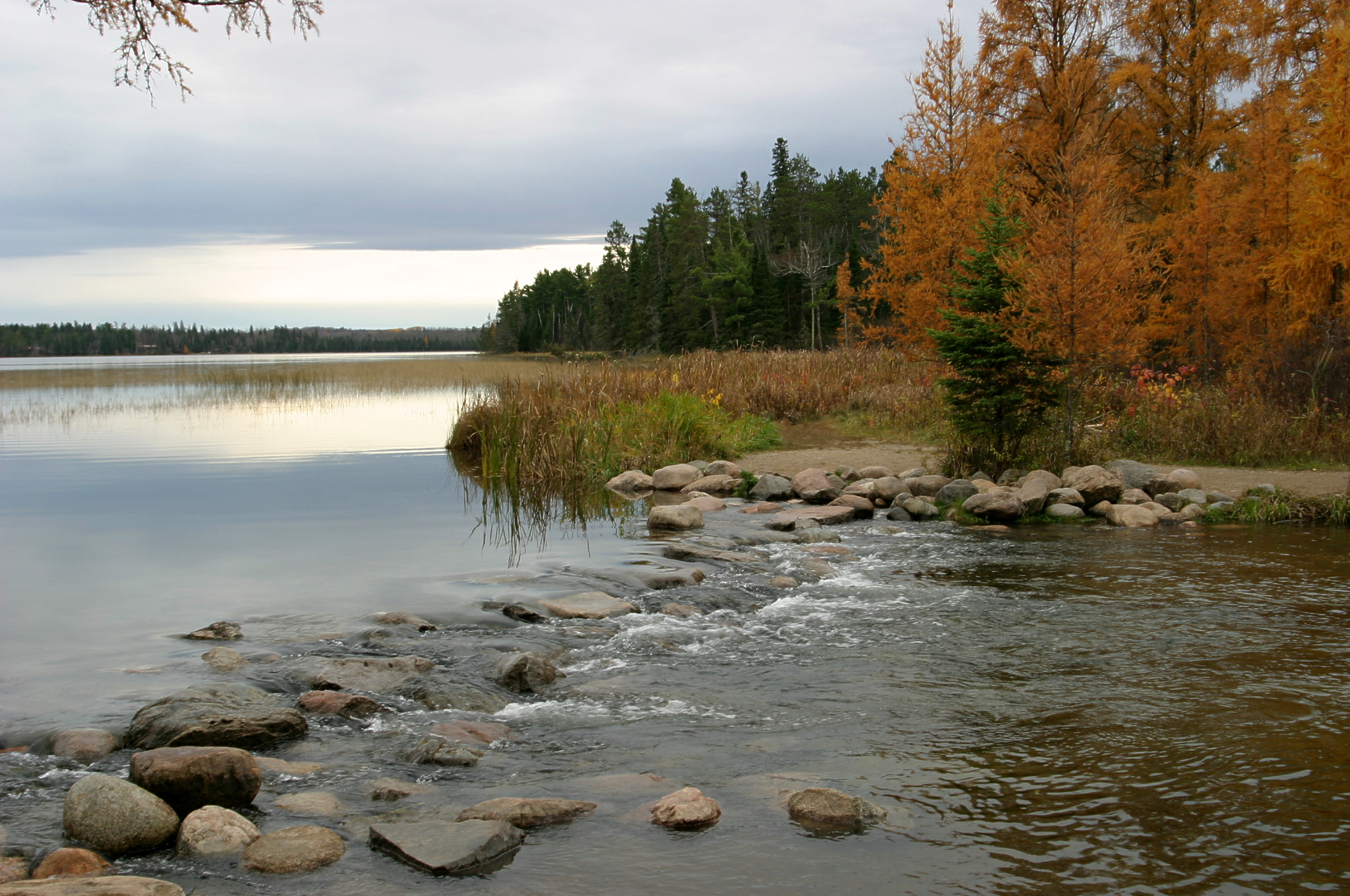
Headwaters of the Mississippi River at Itasca State Park.

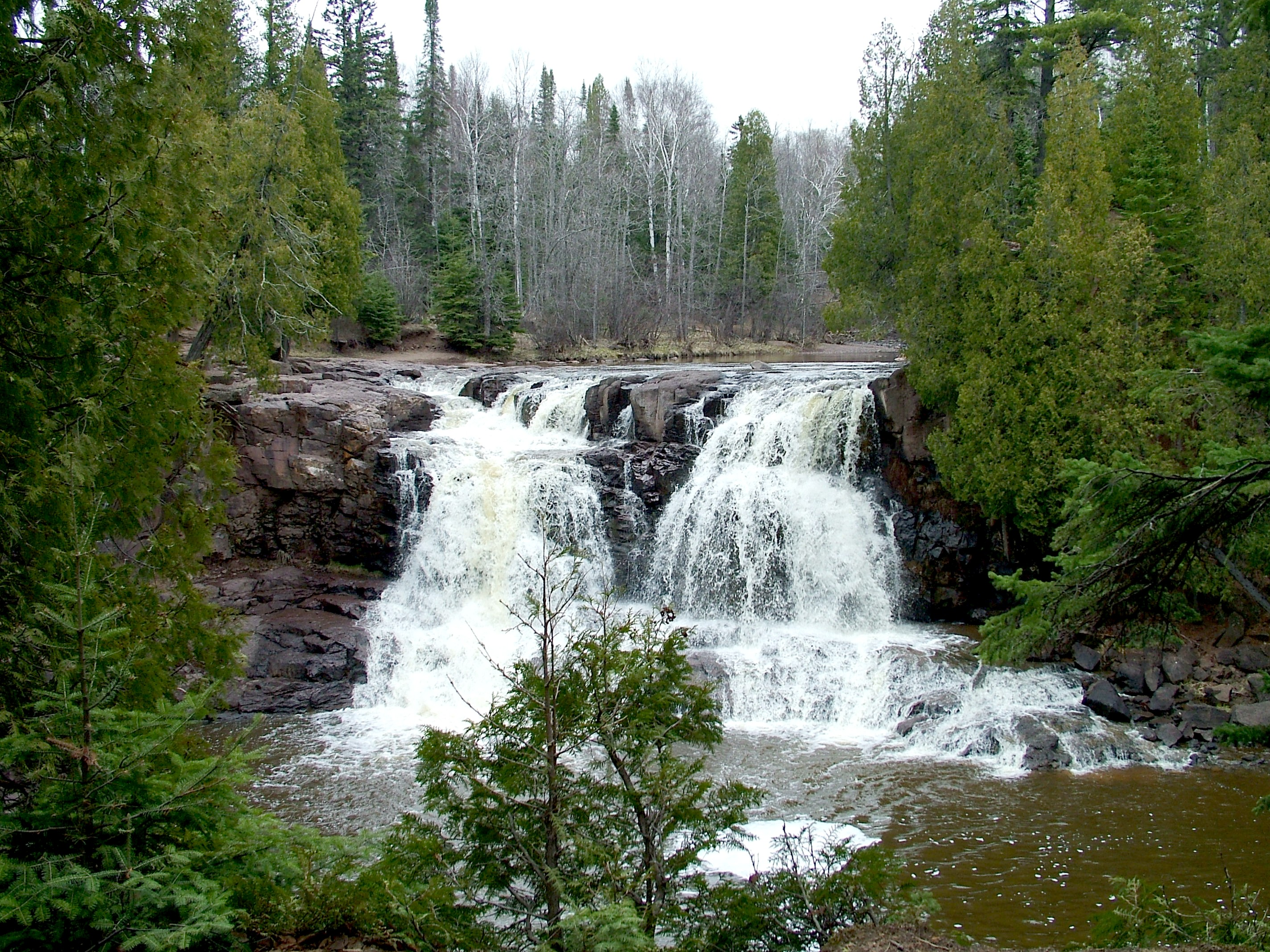
Gooseberry Falls State Park

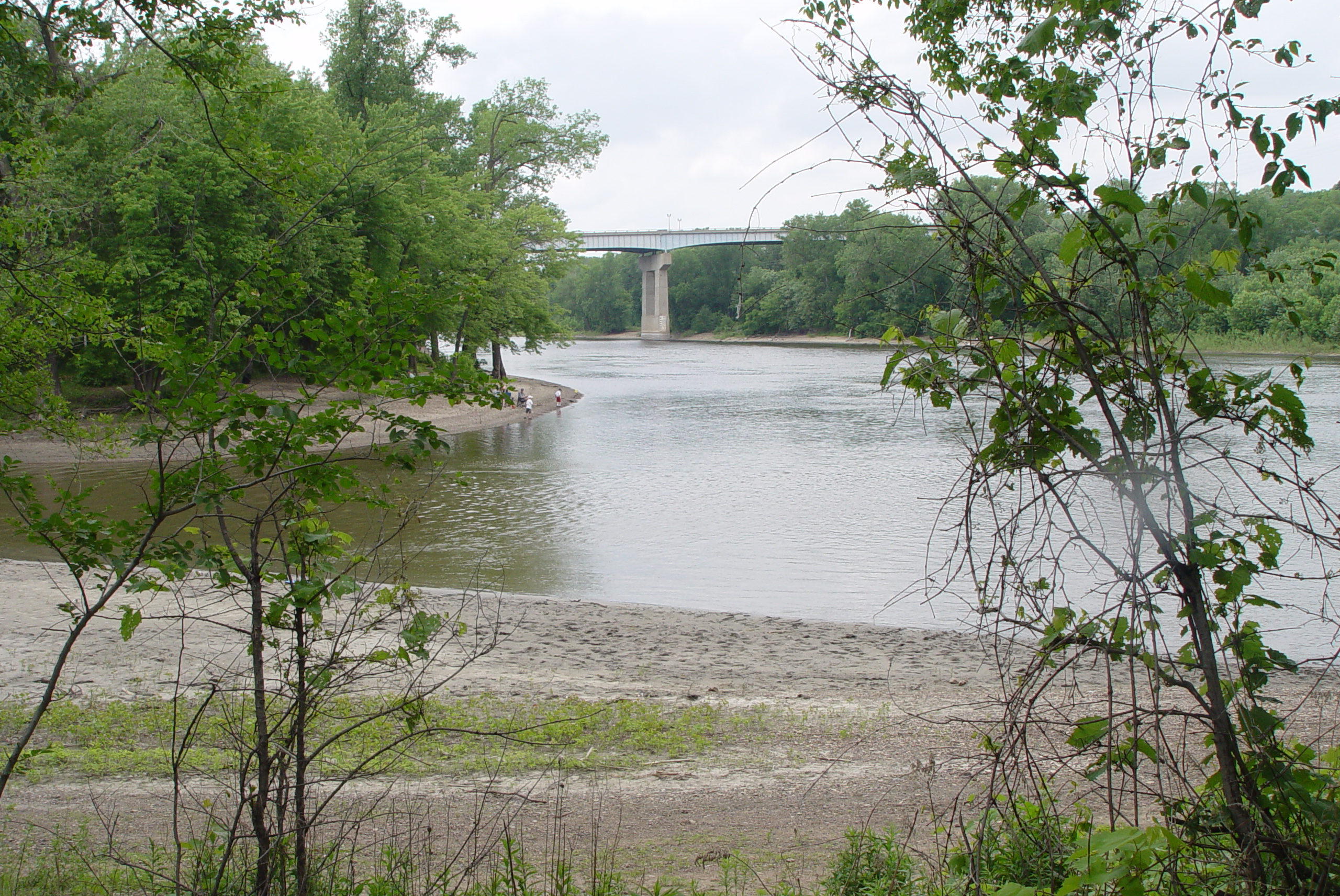
Confluence of the Minnesota River and Mississippi River, in Fort Snelling State Park.

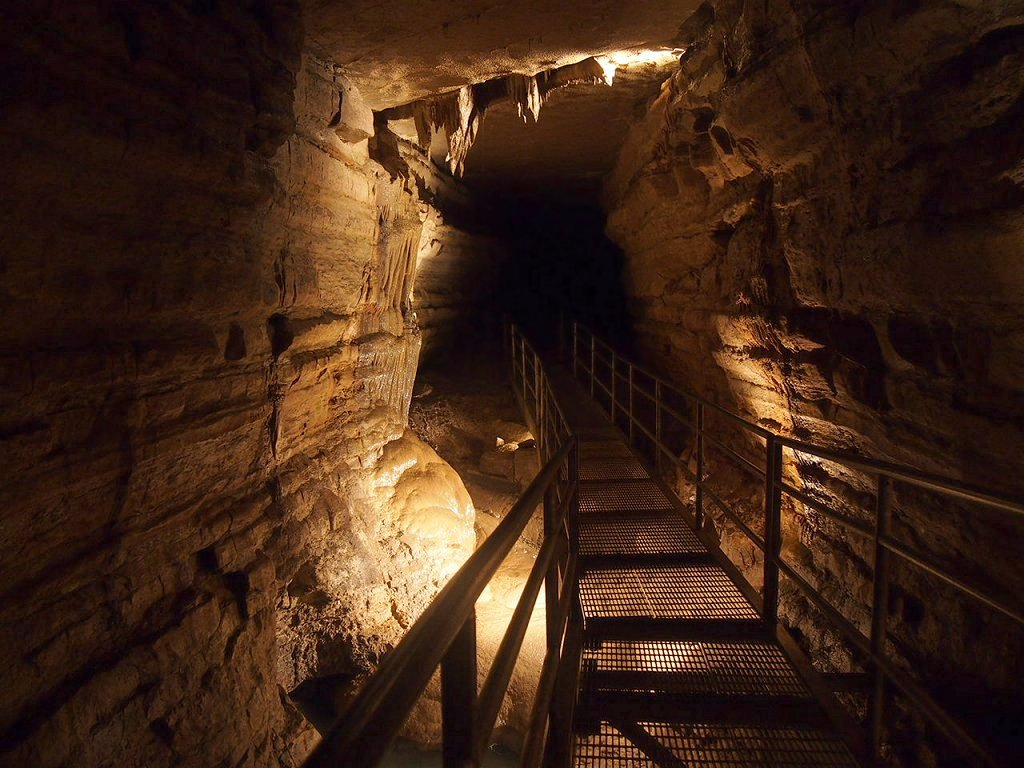
Mystery Cave in Forestville Mystery Cave State Park

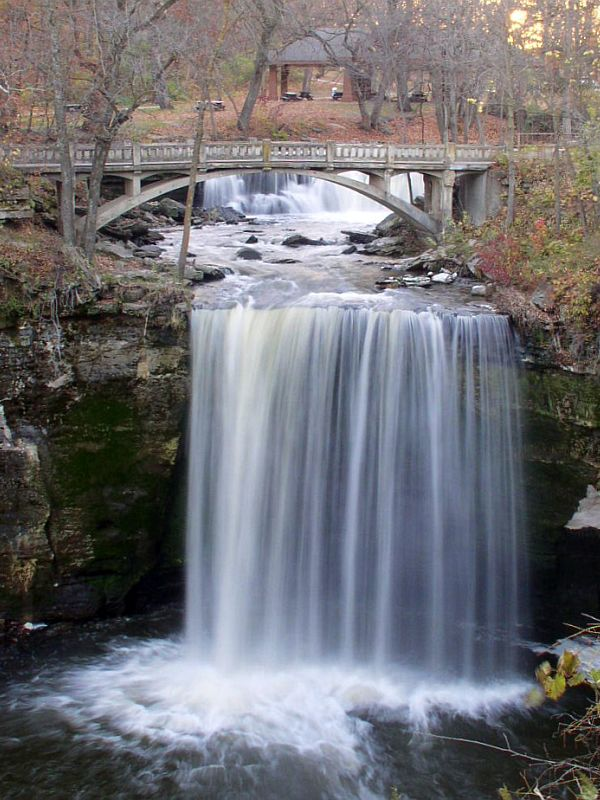
Upper and Lower falls of Minneopa State Park

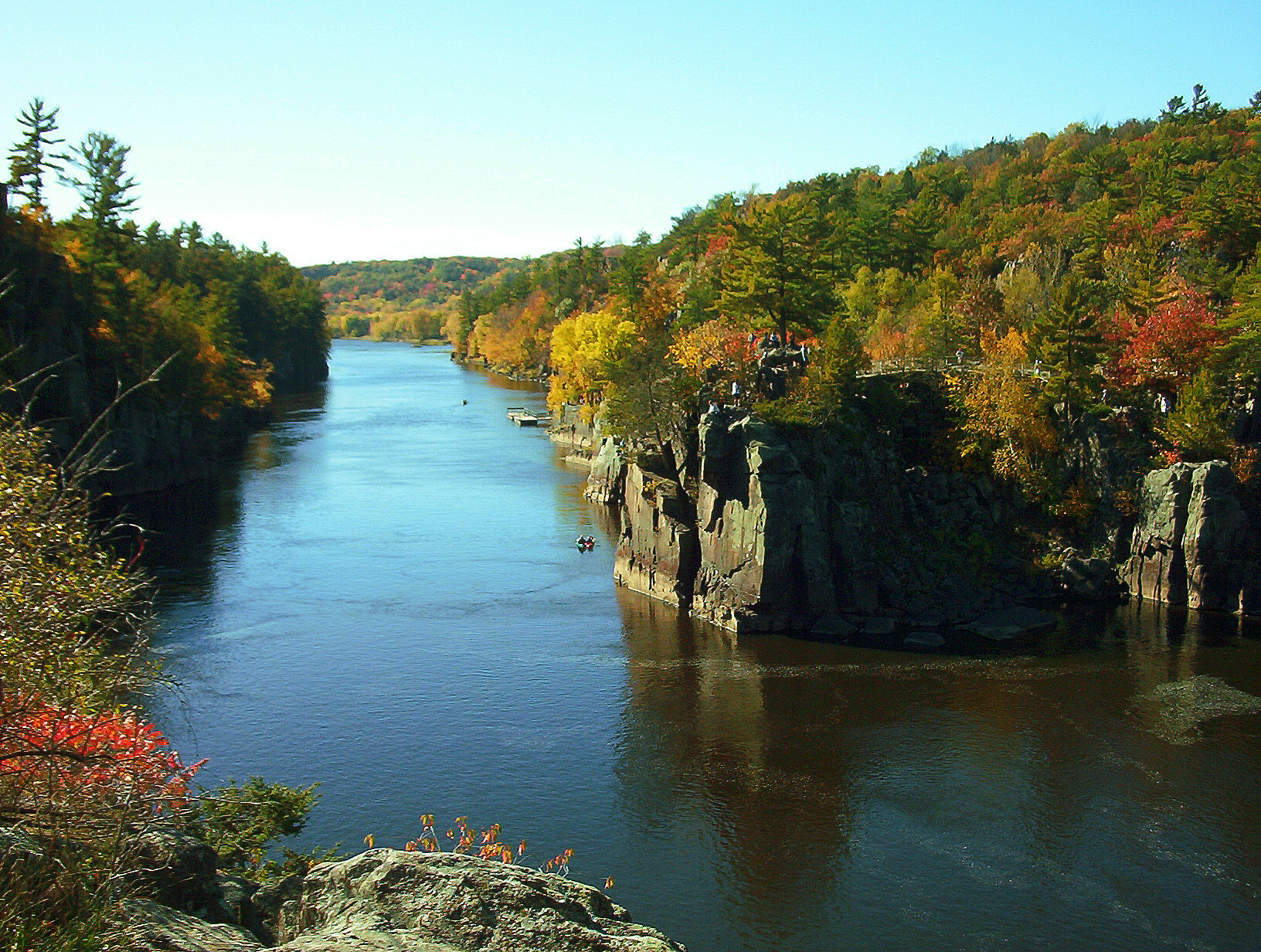
Dalles of the St. Croix River in Interstate State Park

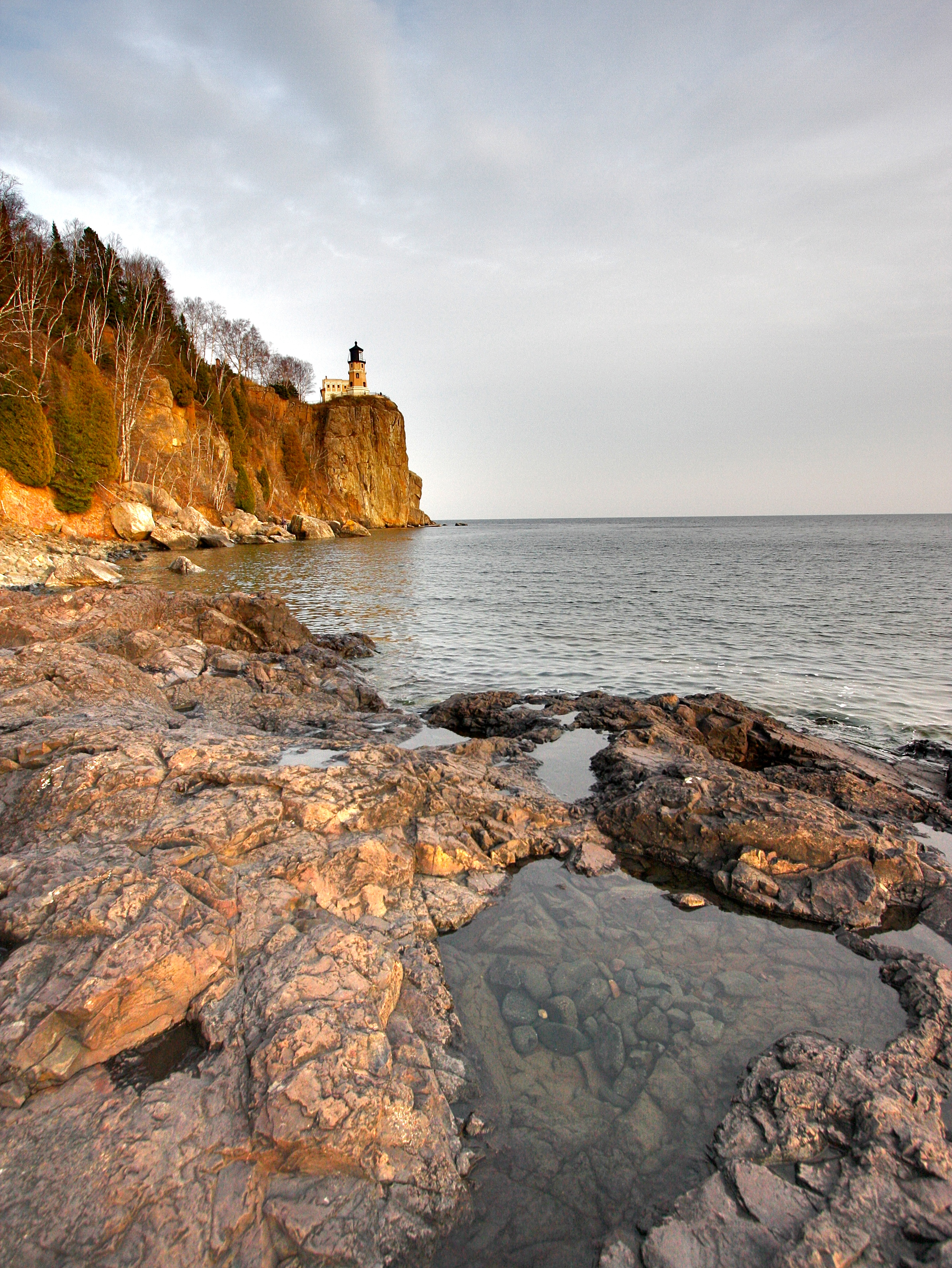
Split Rock Lighthouse State Park

== Lawsuit ==
On November 27, 2012, the White Bear Lake Restoration Association filed a lawsuit against the Minnesota DNR for what the group alleges is the agency's role in the city's disappearing lake. This resulted in the DNR getting 13 communities to adopt water conservation tactics to reduce water consumption.

== Publications ==
The Minnesota Department of Natural Resources publishes a magazine called the Minnesota Conservation Volunteer. It is distributed bimonthly, mailed to subscribers the first weeks of January, March, May, July, September, and November. Minnesota Conservation Volunteer is a "donor-supported magazine advocating conservation and careful use of Minnesota's natural resources." Most of the articles are also made available on the official DNR website.

== Volunteering ==
Many of the services provided by the Minnesota DNR are actually done by the more than 33,000 volunteers that actively contribute. The department has volunteer positions ranging from jobs that require little to no prior experience, to jobs that require specialists with varying skills and a great amount of experience. There are over a dozen specific volunteer programs offered through the DNR that aim to preserve the state's natural beauty. In addition, the DNR works with Minnesotans through external advisory groups and task forces, through which residents can give their ideas and perspectives.

== Education and outreach ==
The DNR offers a variety of educational resources including curriculum supplements (Project Learning Tree, Project WET, Project WILD, MinnAqua), outdoor skills and safety training, education materials (field guides, learning kits), volunteer training (Master Naturalist, hunter education), and a variety of other resources (DNR for kids, grants). For a comprehensive list visit http://www.dnr.state.mn.us/education/index.html.

== Commissioners ==
Commissioners of the DNR since its formation in 1931:

- William T. Cox August 20, 1931 - February 1933
- E.V. Willard (acting) February 1933 - September 1933
- E.V. Willard September 1933 - July 1937
- Herman C. Wenzel July 1, 1937 – April 26, 1939
- Lester R. Badger (acting) April 26, 1939 - July 1939
- Lewis H. Merrill (acting) July 14, 1939 – 1939
- William L. Strunk February 1, 1940 - February 1, 1943
- E.V. Willard February 1, 1943 - March 16, 1943
- Chester S. Wilson March 16, 1943 – March 15, 1955
- Clarence Prout (acting) March 15, 1955 – May 1, 1955
- George A. Selke May 1, 1955 – 1960
- Clarence Prout January 4, 1961 - July 1, 1963
- Wayne H. Olson July 1, 1963 – July 16, 1966
- Robert L. Herbst (acting) July 16, 1966 - February 14, 1967
- Jarle B. Leirfallom January 20, 1967 - January 1971
- Robert L. Herbst January 4, 1971 - February 16, 1977
- Michael C. O'Donnell (acting) February 1977 - June 30, 1977
- William B. Nye July 5, 1977 – June 30, 1978
- Joseph N. Alexander July 1, 1978 - January 4, 1991
- Rodney W. Sando January 3, 1991 - January 4, 1999
- Ronald Nargang (acting) January 4, 1999 - January 13, 1999
- Alan Horner January 13, 1999 - January 19, 1999
- Raymond B. Hitchcock (acting) January 20, 1999 - February 14, 1999
- Allen Garber February 15, 1999 - January 3, 2003
- Brad Moore (acting) January 6, 2003 - January 20, 2003
- Eugene R. Merriam January 27, 2003 - January 2, 2007
- Mark Holsten January 3, 2007 – January 3, 2011
- Laurie Martinson (acting) January 4, 2011 - January 5, 2011
- Tom Landwehr January 6, 2011 - January 5, 2019
- Dave Schad (acting) January 5, 2019 - January 7, 2019
- Sarah Strommen January 7, 2019 – present

== See also ==
- List of Minnesota state parks
- List of Minnesota state forests
- List of state and territorial fish and wildlife management agencies in the United States
- Natural history of Minnesota
- Geology of Minnesota
- List of ecoregions in Minnesota
- List of lakes of Minnesota
- List of rivers of Minnesota
