= District No. 28 School =

- U.S. National Register of Historic Places
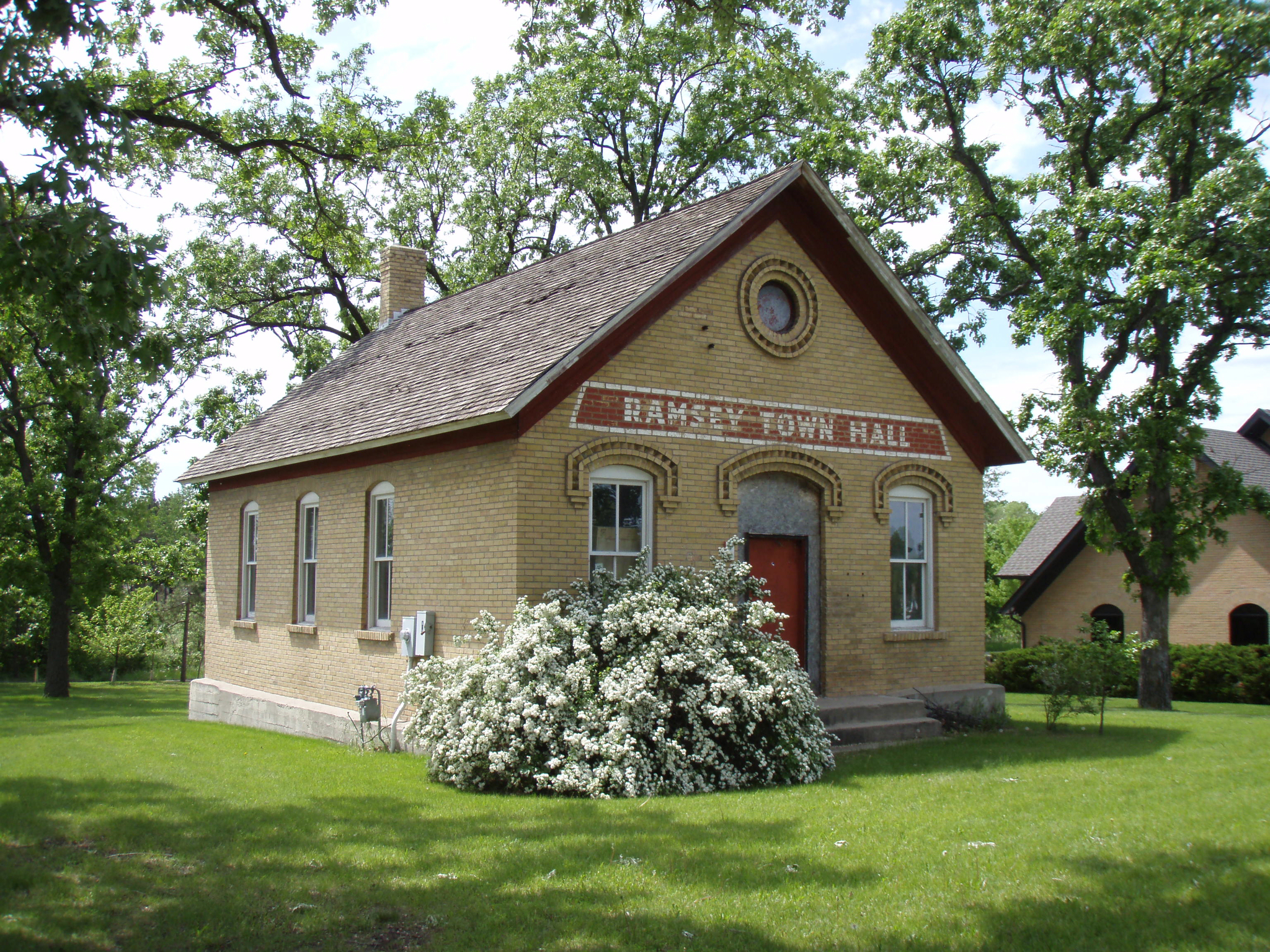

- Location within Minnesota Location within the United States
- Nearest city: Ramsey, Minnesota
- Coordinates: 45°13′37″N 93°23′55″W
- Built: 1892
- NRHP reference No.: 79001188
- Added to NRHP: December 27, 1979

District No. 28 School is a school building in the city of Ramsey, Minnesota, United States, just north of Anoka. The school is listed on the National Register of Historic Places. It was originally a school house, but later became the town hall. The building is one of only a few structures remaining from the beginnings of the township.

The comprehensive plan for Ramsey's development, developed in late 2008, views the old town hall as a metaphor for the community: "A small, aging brick building stands like a question mark between a day-care center and a bank. A weathered sign identifies it as the Ramsey Town Hall. Although no longer used, this structure personifies Ramsey today. It asserts the key issue is not if Ramsey should grow, but how it will it develop."

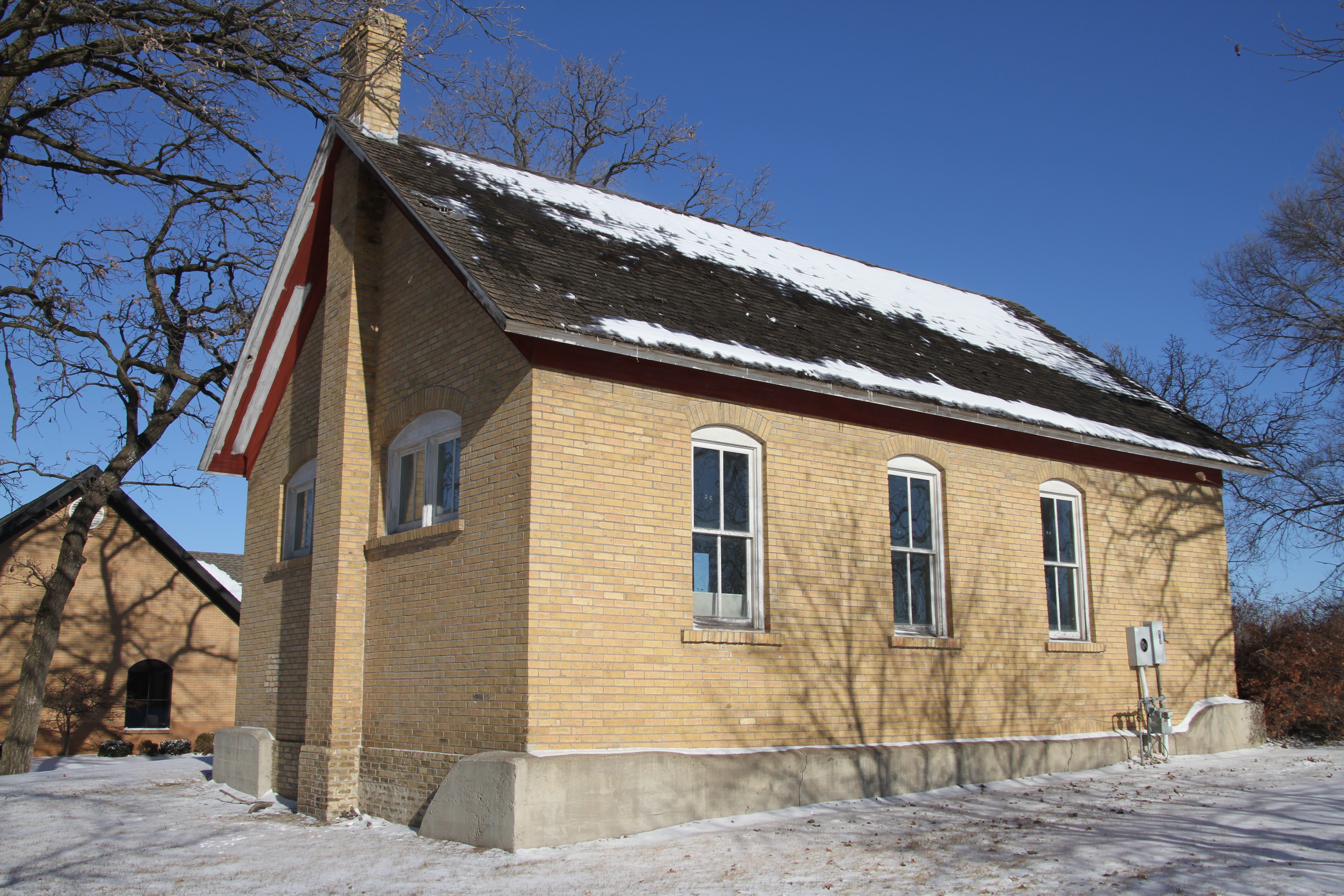
The building from the back in 2018

The city of Ramsey has been exploring options for the old town hall. One option would be to use it as community space and/or a historical center. Another option would be to lease out the space to a nearby business as additional office or meeting space. The third option would be to move the building from its current location to a new location in a city park and to use it as community space or a historical center. Under all three options under discussion, the renovation would be completed. However, moving the building would most likely cause it to lose its status as a historical site.
