= Eugene R. Merriam =

American politician

Eugene R. "Gene" Merriam
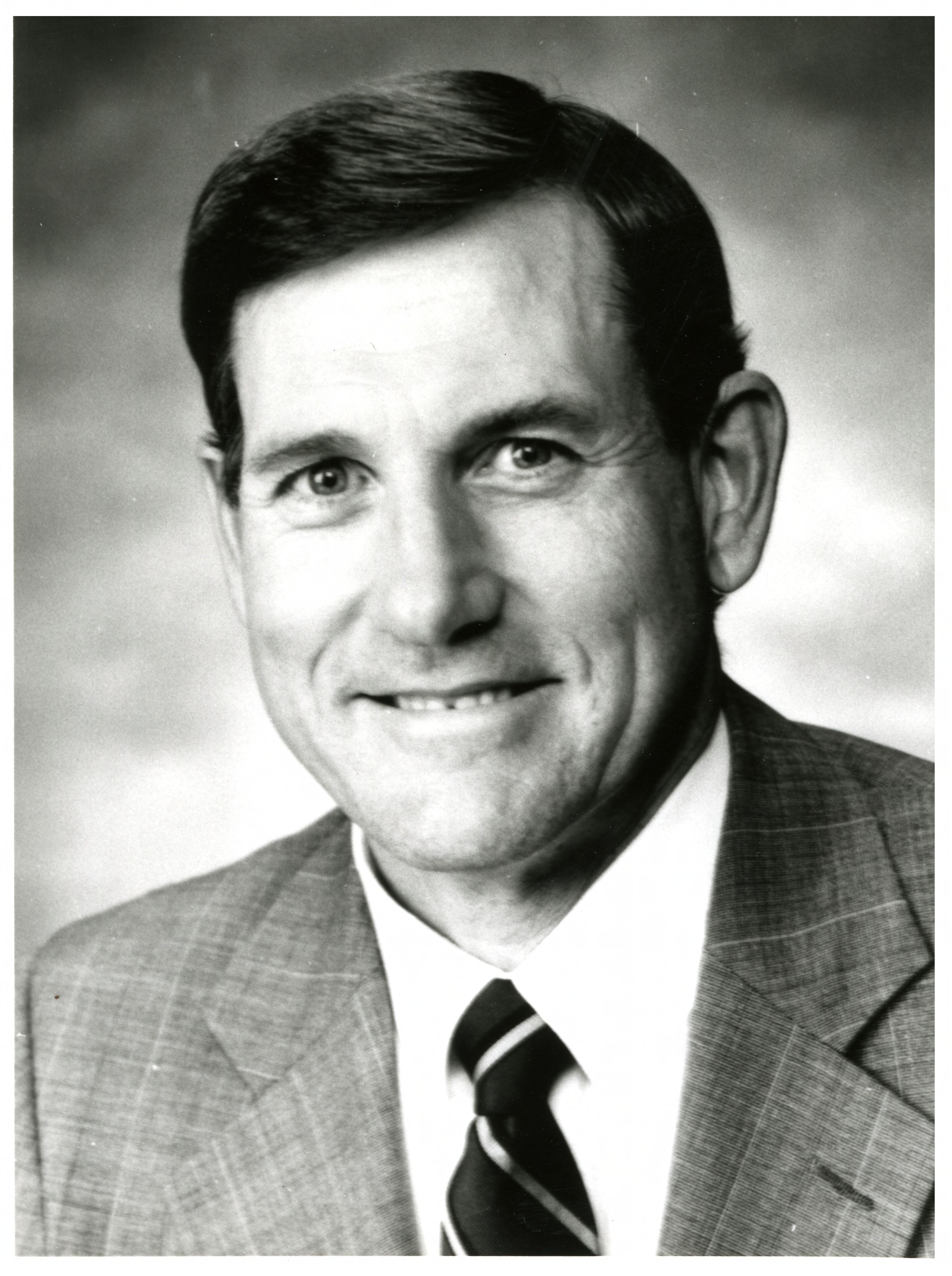
- Portrait of Gene Merriam from the 1991-1992 legislative session.
- Born: November 1, 1944 (age 81); Minneapolis, Minnesota, United States
- Education: University of Minnesota
- Occupations: Businessman, politician
- Known for: Serving in the Minnesota State Senate and as Commissioner of the Minnesota Department of Natural Resources
- Political party: Democratic

Eugene R. "Gene" Merriam (born November 1, 1944) was an American businessman and politician.

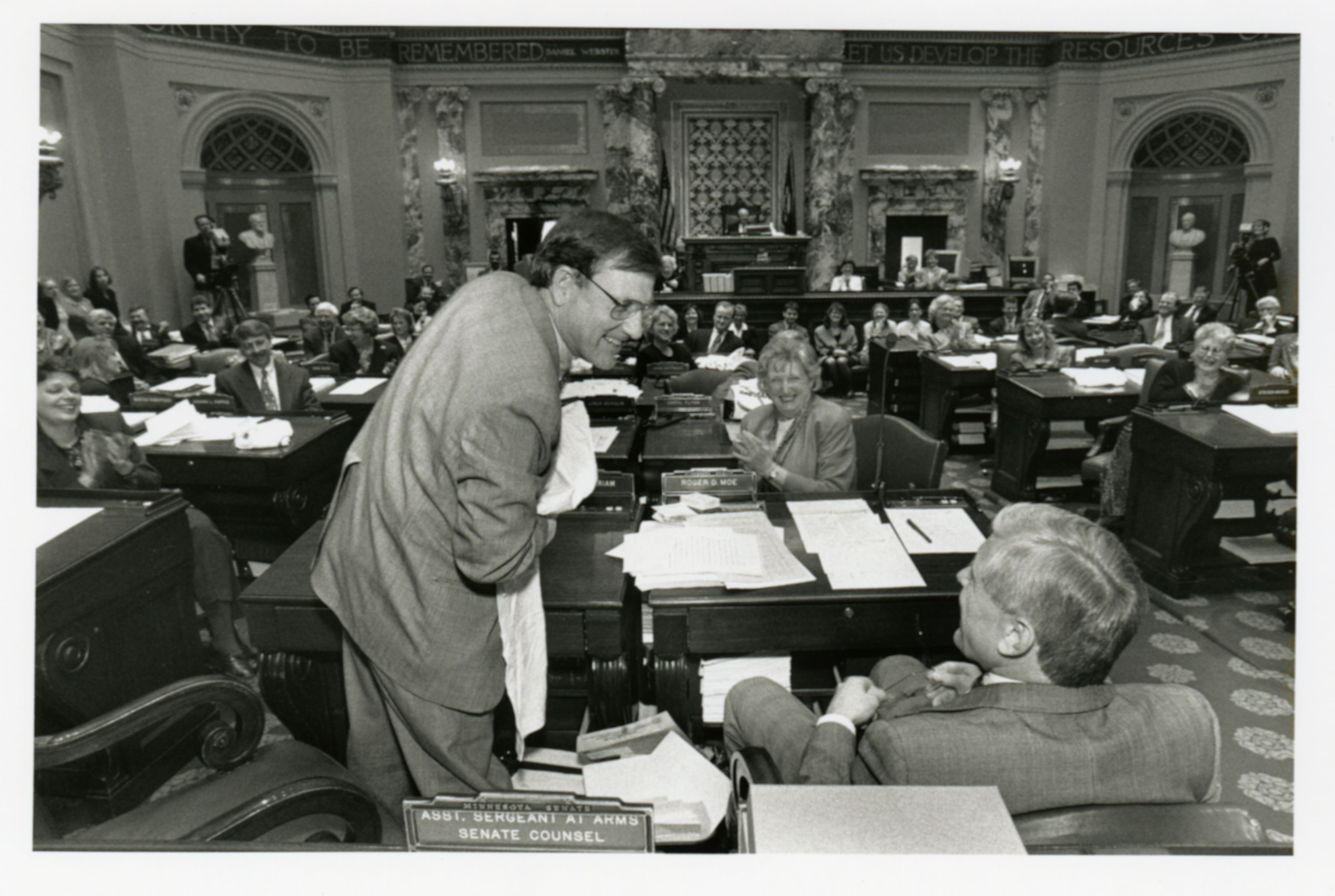
Sen. Gene Merriam on the Senate floor during his final session.

Born in Minneapolis, Minnesota, Merriam graduated from Benilde-St. Margaret's High School in 1962. Merriam served in the United States Marine Corps. In 1967, Merriam graduated from University of Minnesota and was a certified public accountant. He lived in Coon Rapids, Minnesota. He served on the Coon Rapids City Council in 1973 and 1974 and was a Democrat. From 1975 until 1997, Merriam served in the Minnesota State Senate. From 2003 to 2007, Merriam served as commissioner of the Minnesota Department of Natural Resources.
