= James Beatty (Minnesota pioneer) =

Minnesota Territory pioneer and politician

Member of the Minnesota Territorial House of Representatives
- In office January 3, 1855 – January 1, 1856
- In office January 7, 1852 – January 4, 1853

Personal details
- Born: April 27, 1816 Fairfield County, Ohio, U.S.
- Died: January 3, 1892 (aged 75) Sauk Rapids, Minnesota, U.S.
- Party: Democratic
- Children: 3
- Occupation: Merchant; farmer; trader; hotel owner

James B. Beatty (April 27, 1816 – January 3, 1892) was an American merchant, pioneer, farmer, trader, hotel owner, and territorial legislator. Originally from Ohio, Beatty arrived in Minnesota in 1848 and was a leading figure in the state's early days. He served two non-consecutive terms in the Minnesota Territorial Legislature in 1852 and 1855.

== Early life ==
James B. Beatty was born on April 27, 1816, in Fairfield County, Ohio. At the age of fourteen, he relocated to Cass County, Michigan, before becoming a government farmer for the Ho-Chunk near Fort Atkinson, Iowa. Beatty came to Minnesota, at the time part of Wisconsin Territory, in 1848 and led trading posts in Sauk Rapids and the counties of Blue Earth and Anoka. Beatty was connected with the fur trade in Minnesota, and was described by The St. Paul Globe as "interested at (Itasca, Minnesota)."

== Political career ==
Beatty was a member of the Democratic Party. He was elected as the messenger for the second session of the Minnesota Territorial House of Representatives in 1851, though resigned his position soon after. Beatty was a representative for the fifth district of the Minnesota Territorial House of Representatives, representing Benton and Cass counties, in 1852 and again in 1855.

== Post-legislative career and death ==
In 1855, Beatty was a builder of the military road from Big Lake to Crow Wing. Beatty was engaged as a merchant in Hennepin County from 1860 to 1869. He resided in Sauk Rapids beginning around 1866, keeping a hotel there until failing health forced him to retire. He died at his home in Sauk Rapids on January 3, 1892, at the age of 76.

== Personal life ==
Beatty was an Episcopalian and was survived by his wife and three children: one son and two daughters.
