= Itasca, Minnesota =

Abandoned village in Minnesota, US

Coordinates: 45°14′46″N 93°30′15″W

Itasca is an abandoned settlement in what is now the city of Ramsey, in Anoka County, in the U.S. state of Minnesota.

== History ==
Thomas A. Holmes and James Beatty built the Old Log Trading Post in 1849 at the townsite location. Governor Alexander Ramsey suggested the site be named "Itasca (Itaska)" in honor of Lake Itasca. The village was officially named Itasca with the building of the Northern Pacific Railway through the site. Thomas Holmes and James Beatty owned the only two homes at the site in 1851.

The platting of the village and the building of a hotel with John Culberson Bowers as the landlord occurred in 1852. Many other buildings, including the Stage Coach Barn and the first post office in Anoka County, continued to be added. John C. Bowers was the first postmaster, a position he held for twenty-five years. There were unsuccessful attempts to make it the territorial capital.

The Itasca Village was near a heavily traveled Red River Oxcart Trail that brought goods and money to the town. Many people also visited the village while traveling the Mississippi River to Ramsey, Minnesota, on the Governor Ramsey steamboat.

The village's prosperity declined when the removal of the Winnebago Tribe reduced trade in the region. The post office remained until 1879 and was the first mailing address of the National Grange of the Order of Patrons of Husbandry.

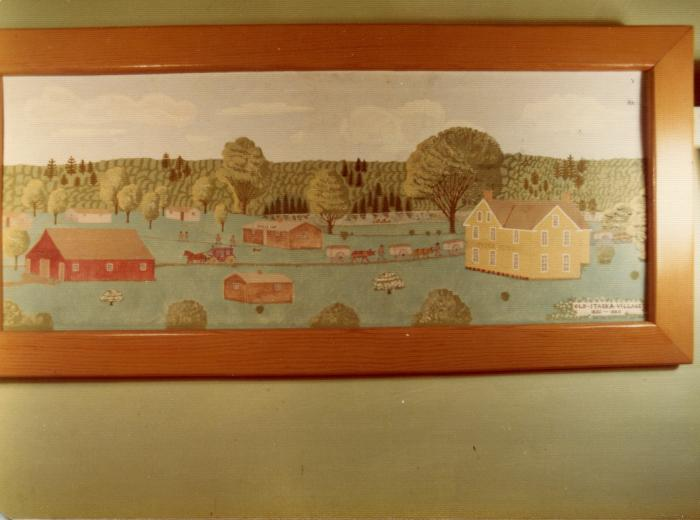
Painting of Itasca Village

== Present day ==
Today the Itasca Village site serves as a highway rest stop along the U.S. 10 Route. The rest stop is known as the Dayton port rest area. There is a historical marker at the location.

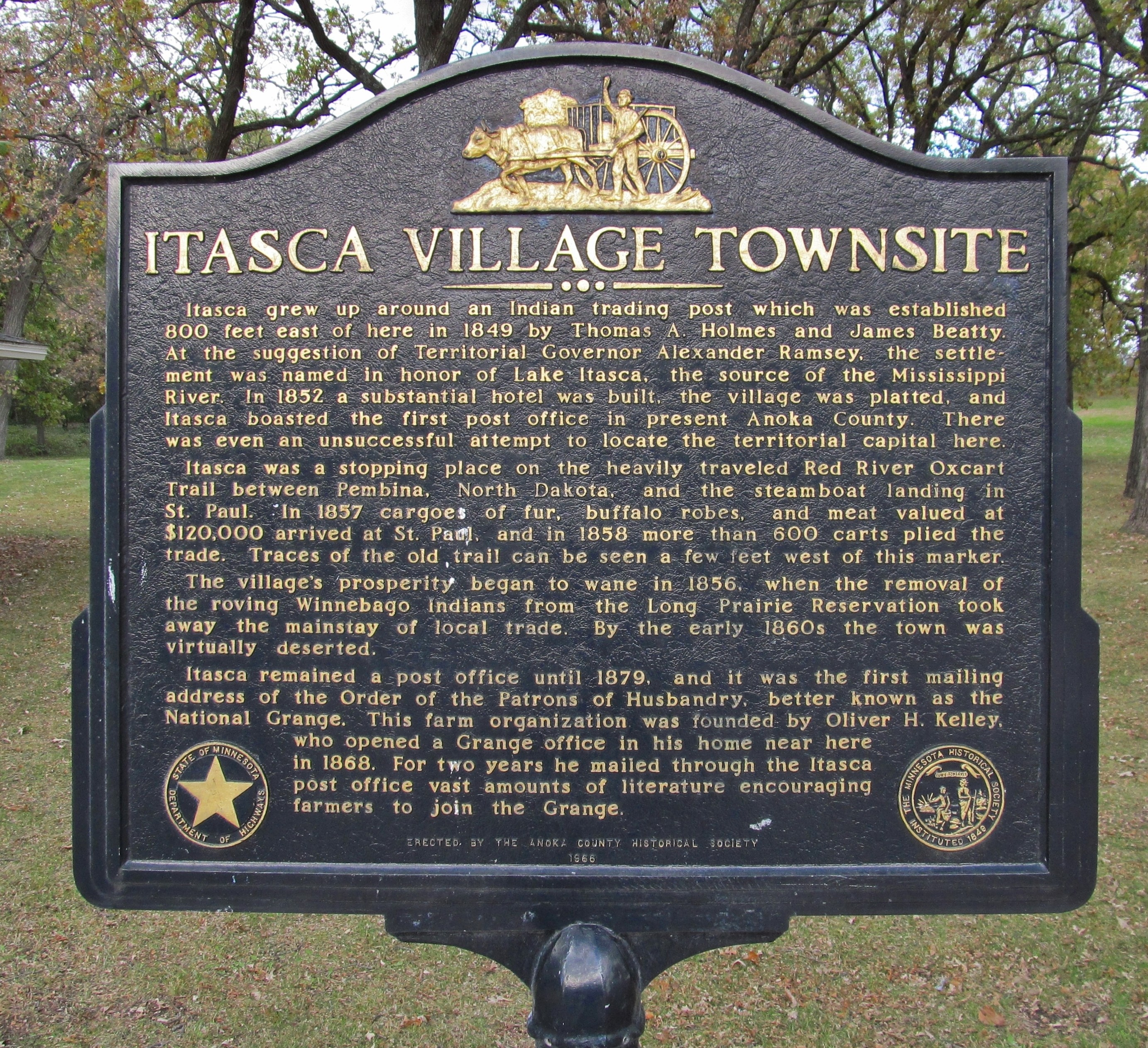
