= Imitation of War =

Studio album by Itasca
- Released: February 9, 2024
- Genre: Folk rock; post-punk
- Length: 40:32
- Label: Paradise of Bachelors
- Producer: Kayla Cohen; Robbie Cody

Itasca chronology
Spring (2019)	Imitation of War (2024)

Imitation of War is the fifth studio album by American musician Kayla Cohen under the pseudonym Itasca, released on February 9, 2024, through Paradise of Bachelors. Cohen produced the album with Robbie Cody. It received positive reviews from critics.

== Critical reception ==
Professional ratings
Aggregate scores
Source	Rating
Metacritic	78/100
Review scores
Source	Rating
AllMusic	3.5/5 stars
Clash	8/10
Pitchfork	7.4/10
Uncut	8/10

Imitation of War received a score of 78 out of 100 on review aggregator Metacritic based on four critics' reviews, indicating "generally favorable" reception. Uncut felt that "switching guitars opens her songs up considerably, but Cohen maintains the intimacy and intelligence that have always been her signature". Reviewing the album for Pitchfork, Mitch Therieau called it "conversant in a certain language of post-punk, dual-guitar rock—that of, say, Television or Pavement—but whose animating spirit lies somewhere else entirely. Over a suite of patient songs that don't so much stretch out as tunnel inward, Cohen and her band render richly textured guitar-rock dreamscapes that nonetheless feel grounded and immediate."

Marcy Donelson of AllMusic wrote that Imitation of War "finds Itasca taking the band's sound a step further by plugging in and dipping a toe into rock territory for the first time, if a particularly hazy, heavy-lidded, and still folk-style variety of rock". Clash's Robin Murray described it as "a wonderful record – hugely atmospheric, it transcends her freak folk past, taking on a life and colour of its own".

== Track listing ==
Imitation of War track listing
No.	Title	Length
1.	"Milk"	4:48
2.	"Imitation of War"	4:14
3.	"Under Gates of Cobalt Blue"	4:15
4.	"Interlude"	1:01
5.	"Tears on Sky Mountain"	4:28
6.	"Dancing Woman"	3:20
7.	"El Dorado"	3:34
8.	"Easy Spirit"	9:28
9.	"Molière's Reprise"	4:00
10.	"Olympia"	1:24
Total length:		40:32

== Personnel ==
- Kayla Cohen – vocals, guitar and producer
- Evan Backer – bass guitar
- Daniel Swire – drums
- Evan Burrows – drums
- Robbie Cody – producer, mixing and engineering
- Sarah Register – mastering
- Tessa Binder – cover art
- Blake Brent – back cover art
