= Riverside =

Riverside may refer to:

== Places ==
- Riverside (geography), terrain alongside a body of water best known as river bank

=== Australia ===
- Riverside, Tasmania, a suburb of Launceston, Tasmania

=== Canada ===
- Riverside (electoral district), in the Yukon
- Riverside, Calgary, a neighbourhood in Alberta
- Riverside, Manitoba, a former rural municipality
- Riverside, Middlesex County, Ontario, a community in the municipality of Southwest Middlesex
- Rural Municipality of Riverside No. 168, Saskatchewan
- Riverside, Ontario, a neighbourhood of Windsor
- Riverside, Simcoe County, Ontario, a community in the township of Tay
- Riverside, Toronto, a neighbourhood in Riverdale, Toronto, Ontario
- Riverside Ward, former name of River Ward in Ottawa, Ontario

=== New Zealand ===
- Riverside, New Zealand, a locality in Ashburton District, near Wheatstone, New Zealand
- Riverside, Whangārei, a suburb of Whangārei

=== South Africa ===
- Riverside, Mbombela, a suburb of Mbombela, Mpumalanga

=== United Kingdom ===
- Riverside, Cardiff, an inner-city area and community in South Wales
- Riverside (Cardiff electoral ward)
- Riverside (Liverpool ward), a city council ward in England
- Riverside, Newport, a residential area in South Wales
- Riverside (Norwich), a city neighborhood in Norfolk, England
- Riverside (Southwark ward), a ward for Southwark London Borough Council, Greater London
- Riverside, Stirling, a district of the Stirling council area, Scotland
- Riverside, Worcestershire, a district of Redditch, England
- Riverside (music venue), in Newcastle upon Tyne, England, 1985–1999
- Riverside Stadium, in Middlesbrough, England
- Barking Riverside, a town in London, England

=== United States ===
- Riverside, Alabama, a town in St. Clair County
- Riverside, Arizona, an unincorporated area in Arizona
- Riverside, California, a city
  - Riverside City College
  - University of California, Riverside
- Riverside County, California, in Southern California
- Riverside, Connecticut, a neighborhood in Fairfield County
- Riverside, Delaware, an unincorporated community in New Castle County
- Riverside–11th Street Bridge, a district in Wilmington, Delaware
- Riverside, Jacksonville, Florida, a neighborhood
- Riverside (Miami), a neighborhood in Miami-Dade County, Florida
- Riverside, Georgia (disambiguation), several places
- Riverside, Idaho (disambiguation), several communities
- Riverside, Illinois, a suburban village in Cook County
- Riverside, Indiana (disambiguation), several places
- Riverside, Iowa, a city in Washington County
- Riverside, Wichita, Kansas, a neighborhood Wichita
- Riverside, Kentucky, an unincorporated community in Warren County
- Riverside, The Farnsley-Moremen Landing, a historic farm and mansion in Louisville, Kentucky
- Riverside, Maryland (disambiguation), several communities
- Riverside, Cambridge, a neighborhood in Massachusetts
- Riverside, Michigan, an unincorporated community in Hagar Township, Berrien County
- Riverside, part of Depot Town in Ypsilanti, Michigan
- Riverside (Duluth), a neighborhood in Duluth, Minnesota
- Riverside, Forrest County, Mississippi, a ghost town
- Riverside, Lafayette County, Mississippi, a ghost town
- Riverside, Missouri, a city in Platte County
- Riverside, Jefferson County, Missouri, an unincorporated community
- Riverside, Reynolds County, Missouri, a ghost town
- Riverside, Montana, an unincorporated community in Ravalli County
- Riverside (Hamilton, Montana), an historic house in Ravalli County
- Riverside, Nebraska, a ghost town in Burt County
- Riverside, Nevada, an unincorporated community in Clark County
- Riverside, New Jersey (disambiguation), several places
- Riverside, New Mexico (disambiguation), several communities
- Riverside, New York (disambiguation), several communities
- Riverside (house), a mansion on the Upper West Side of New York City, New York
- Riverside (Grandin, North Carolina), a historic home in Caldwell County
- Riverside (New England, North Dakota), a historic hotel
- Riverside, Ohio, a city in Montgomery County
- Riverside, Cincinnati, a former village in Hamilton County, Ohio; now a neighborhood in Cincinnati, Ohio
- Riverside, Oklahoma City, a neighborhood in Oklahoma City
- Riverside, Oregon (disambiguation), several communities
- Riverside, Cambria County, Pennsylvania, an unincorporated community and census-designated place
- Riverside, Pennsylvania, a borough in Northumberland County
- Riverside, Rhode Island, a neighborhood in East Providence
- Riverside, South Dakota, an unincorporated community in Hanson County
- Riverside, Houston, a neighborhood in Houston, Texas
- Riverside, Texas, a city in Walker County
- Riverside, South Memphis, a neighborhood in South Memphis, Tennessee
- Riverside, Utah, a census-designated place in Box Elder County
- Riverside (Lyndonville, Vermont), an historic house in Caledonia County
- Riverside, Virginia, an unincorporated community in Roanoke County
- Riverside (Front Royal, Virginia), an historic home in Warren County
- Riverside, Spokane, a neighborhood in Spokane, Washington
- Riverside, Washington, a town in Okanogan County
- Riverside, West Virginia (disambiguation), several communities
- Riverside, Burnett County, Wisconsin, an unincorporated community in the town of Blaine
- Riverside, Lafayette County, Wisconsin, an unincorporated community in the town of Gratiot
- Riverside, Wyoming, a town in Carbon County

==== Multiple states ====
- Riverside Township (disambiguation), many places in many states

== Music ==
- Riverside (band), a Polish progressive metal/rock band
- Riverside (album), by Dave Douglas, 2014
- "Riverside" (song), released by Dutch DJ Sidney Samson in 2009
- "Riverside", a song by Agnes Obel
- "Riverside", a song by America on the 1971 album America
- "Riverside", a song by Moka Only on the 2009 album Lowdown Suite 2… The Box
- "Riverside", a song by Status Quo on the 1981 album Never Too Late

== Motor racing ==
- Riverside International Raceway, Riverside County, California (1957–1989)
- Riverside International Speedway, James River, Nova Scotia, Canada
- Riverside International Speedway (West Memphis, Arkansas)

== Other uses ==
- 4871 Riverside, an asteroid
- Beverly Toon House, a house in Franklin, Tennessee, also called Riverside
- Riverside series, a series of fantasy novels by Ellen Kushner
- Riverside (software), an Israeli online software for audio editing
- The Riverside, English name for the defunct Filipino TV series Tabing Ilog
- Riverside (brand), a store brand of motorcycles, mopeds and scooters sold by Montgomery Ward
- Riverside Christian College, school in Maryborough West, Queensland, Australia
- Riverside College (Philippines)
- Riverside Insights, an American book and test publisher

== See also ==
- Riverside Cemetery (disambiguation)
- Riverside Garden (disambiguation)
- Riverside High School (disambiguation)
- Riverside Hotel (disambiguation)
- Riverside Mall (disambiguation)
- Riverside Park (disambiguation)
- Riverside Stadium (disambiguation)
- Riverside Station (disambiguation)
- Riverside Theatre (disambiguation)
- Creekside (disambiguation)
- Riverbank (disambiguation)
- River (disambiguation)
- Side (disambiguation)
