= Riverside, West Virginia =

Riverside is the name of several communities in the U.S. state of West Virginia.

- Riverside, Jefferson County, West Virginia, an unincorporated community
- Riverside, Kanawha County, West Virginia, an unincorporated community
- Riverside, Ritchie County, West Virginia, an unincorporated community
- Riverside, Wood County, West Virginia, an unincorporated community
