= Riverside Junior/Senior High School =

Riverside Junior/Senior High School may refer to:

- Riverside Junior/Senior High School (Boardman, Oregon)
- Riverside Junior/Senior High School (Taylor, Pennsylvania)

== See also ==
- Riverside High School (disambiguation)
