= Riverbank (disambiguation) =

A riverbank is terrain alongside a body of water.

Riverbank may also refer to:

== Places ==
- Riverbank, California, a city in Stanislaus County
- Riverbank, former name of Bryte, California, a ghost town in Yolo County

== Enterprises and organizations ==
- Riverbank Academy, a special school in Coventry, England
- Riverbank Arts Centre, Newbridge, County Kildare, Ireland
- Riverbank West, luxury high-rise apartment building at 560 West 43rd Street in Hell's Kitchen, Manhattan
- Riverbanks Zoo, a zoo in South Carolina
- The RiverBank, 1920–2011, a Wisconsin bank offering banking, insurance and investment services

== Entertainment ==
- "River Bank" (Jamaican song), a 1964 song by Byron Lee and the Dragonaires (adapted as a 1978 single by Headley Bennett)
- "River Bank" (Brad Paisley song), a 2014 single by Brad Paisley
- "Riverbank" a 2016 song by Bolier feat. Mingue
- "The Riverbank", a song by Paul Simon from his album Stranger to Stranger
- The Riverbank, 2012 Canadian film directed by John L'Ecuyer.
- River Bank (film), 2020 French film directed by Étienne Faure.

== See also ==
- Creekside (disambiguation)
- Riverside (disambiguation)
- River (disambiguation)
- Bank (disambiguation)
