= 石浦 =

石浦, meaning "stone, riverbank", may refer to:

- Battle of Shipu, French naval victory during the Sino-French War
- Ishiura, Japanese surname
- Seokpo station (석포역), station on the Yeongdong Line of Korail
- Shipu (石浦镇), town in Xiangshan County, Zhejiang, China

== See also ==
- Riverbank (disambiguation)
- Stone (disambiguation)
