= Lenny Brown =

American basketball player (born 1975)

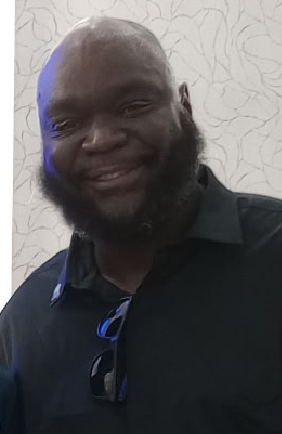
- Brown in 2025

Personal information
- Born: April 29, 1975 (age 50)
- Listed height: 6 ft 2 in (1.88 m)
- Listed weight: 185 lb (84 kg)

Career information
- High school: William Penn (New Castle, Delaware); Maine Central Institute (Pittsfield, Maine)
- College: Xavier (1995–1999)
- Playing career: 1999–2002
- Position: Guard

Career history
- 1999–2000: Cincinnati Stuff
- 2000–2001: Spirou Charleroi
- 2002: St. Louis SkyHawks

Career highlights
- First-team All-Atlantic 10 (1997, 1999); Second-team All-Atlantic 10 (1998); Delaware Sports Museum and Hall of Fame (2025)

Leonard Lamont Brown (born April 29, 1975) is an American former basketball player. From Wilmington, Delaware, Brown grew up in the Riverside housing project, one of the poorest areas in the state. He sold drugs to support his family and was expelled from William Penn High School as a freshman. After a few months, he decided to try to return to school after realizing that "basketball at William Penn was his only chance for a better future". He became a top basketball player at William Penn, helping them to their first state championship while being named the state player of the year.

Ineligible as a senior at William Penn, Brown spent a year at Maine Central Institute (MCI) before enrolling at Xavier University in 1995. He played basketball for the Xavier Musketeers, leading the team in scoring in three years while setting multiple school records. At Xavier, he made one of the most famous plays in school history by scoring a game-winning buzzer beater to defeat number one-ranked Cincinnati in the Crosstown Shootout. He later played professional basketball in the International Basketball League (IBL), for a team in Belgium, and in the United States Basketball League (USBL). He was inducted into the Xavier Athletic Hall of Fame in 2004 and into the Delaware Sports Museum and Hall of Fame in 2025.

== Early life ==
Brown is from Wilmington, Delaware. His mother, Jerina, had him at age 13, and was left to raise him and later his siblings at age 17 when her mother died. Brown grew up in a four-bedroom house in the Riverside federal housing project. Riverside was among the poorest areas in Delaware and near the state prison; one of Brown's cousins was killed in the neighborhood and another survived being shot on two occasions. The area was known as "The Bucket" and The Cincinnati Enquirer described it as follows:

Two-story town-houses of squat brick, no grass in the front yards, windows boarded up, 5-year-olds on the corner in the middle of the day, doing the devil's business. A place just mean enough to keep your heart broken.

Living with his mother, siblings, and several cousins, Brown "became the man of the house at a young age". His mother struggled with addiction at times and by age 12, Brown "was raising himself", according to the Enquirer. To support the family, Brown sold drugs nearby his home. He attended William Penn High School in New Castle, but was expelled for excessive truancy as a freshman after missing close to 80 days of school in his first semester. His expulsion was made on his 16th birthday, the first day he was eligible for it.

== High school career ==
Afterwards, Brown played basketball at local playgrounds and sold drugs. After a few months out of school, his best friend was imprisoned for selling drugs, and the friend called him from prison, telling Brown: "You don't want to be here, man". Per the Enquirer, Brown "decided basketball at William Penn was his only chance for a better future". He tried to re-enter the school and after his aunt argued his case to the school's principal, he was allowed to return. He had to repeat a grade, but attended school enough to be eligible to play basketball. He became a starter on the school's varsity team as a freshman. However, he gave "his coaches headaches" according to The News Journal, and came close to transferring to Howard High School of Technology for his sophomore year. He ended up staying and matured in his next season, attending class more often and being named second-team all-state in basketball while contributing to William Penn's Blue Hen Conference title.

During the 1993–94 season, Brown's junior year, he led them to the championship of the Slam Dunk at the Beach competition, which featured some of the top high school basketball teams in the country. It was the first title for a Delaware team at the event and Brown was named the tournament's most valuable player. He helped William Penn finish with a record of 23–4 and averaged a team-leading 20.8 points, 2.4 steals and 1.6 blocks per game, while also being second on the team in rebounds (6.5 per game) and assists (3.1). Brown led William Penn to the state championship, where he scored 28 points in a win over Caesar Rodney High School for the school's first boys' basketball state title. He was named the Delaware boys basketball player of the year for the 1993–94 season by the Delaware Sportswriters and Broadcasters Association. As he had attended William Penn for four years, he was ineligible to compete as a senior in the 1994–95 season. He finished his stint at William Penn having scored 1,242 points.

Brown wanted to attend a preparatory school so he could continue to play basketball and improve his grades for college, but his future initially seemed uncertain at the conclusion of his junior basketball season. However, after the championship game, he was approached by Nicole Brown, a counselor who started a program to help "give high school students some direction". Described by William Penn's head coach as "sent from heaven", Nicole Brown guided Lenny Brown for the rest of his junior year and went with him searching for prep schools he could attend. They decided on Maine Central Institute (MCI), but they were faced with the challenge of tuition costs – it cost $17,000 to attend and Brown received "the maximum in need-based financial aid", but had to provide the rest, $8,000, himself. Paul Daugherty in The Cincinnati Enquirer wrote,

Eight thousand dollars? That was like asking an elephant to fly. Nicole Brown raised the money. She begged it from Wilmington businessmen. When they came up $1,900 short after the first semester, she called [William Penn coach] Jim Phillips, in tears. MCI wasn't going to let Lenny come back. Phillips had his brother, a successful attorney, write the check for the rest of the year. "You're not going to MCI just for you," Nicole told Lenny. "You're going for me, and for everybody that's coming up the same way you came up."

Brown enrolled at MCI in September 1994 and played one season of basketball there. Around Christmas, his 14-year-old cousin, Howard, was murdered in Wilmington after an argument with a 21-year-old. After learning of his cousin's death, Brown initially decided to quit basketball, but later decided to return to playing at MCI at the urging of his coach and family members, telling The Cincinnati Post that "my family said to [return to MCI] and that I had made it this far, why stop. Plus, I think he would've wanted me to go back." At MCI, he helped the basketball team compile a record of 34–6 while appearing in the New England championship game. He averaged 13.6 points per game and also scored 25 points in the team's three-point championship loss. Additionally, he performed well academically, recording only "B" and "A" grades in his classes. After his season at MCI, he committed to play college basketball for the Xavier Musketeers, where he was joined by Gary Lumpkin, a former teammate from William Penn. He was later selected the co-Delaware High School Basketball Player of the Decade as chosen by Delaware's Finest Inc. in 2000.

== College career ==
Brown, a guard, entered his freshman season as a starter in 1995–96. However, after two games at Xavier, Brown, feeling like he did not fit in, decided to leave the school. He packed his belongings and traveled to the bus station, being noticed by Lumpkin along the way, who notified team officials. As he was boarding the bus, Xavier athletic director Jeff Fogelson attempted to talk him into returning, without success. Fogelson found the bus's route and had the team trainer and an assistant coach drive 80 miles an hour to the next station, "where they found Brown ... playing video games and crying." They were able to convince him to return to Xavier. He appeared in 27 games across the 1995–96 season, being a three-time Atlantic 10 Conference Rookie of the Week while averaging 12.5 points per game. He was selected to the Atlantic 10 All-Rookie team and was Xavier's scoring leader, the first freshman to accomplish the feat since Byron Larkin.

Brown battled injuries as a sophomore in 1996–97 but appeared in 29 games, averaging 15.6 points per game while helping Xavier to the Atlantic 10 regular season title. That season, against number one-ranked Cincinnati, he had one of the most famous plays in the history of the Crosstown Shootout – the annual rivalry game between the two schools. Cincinnati entered the game heavily favored, and Xavier was 17 1/2-point underdogs. With 5.4 seconds left and the score tied, 69–69, Brown received the ball on an inbounds pass. He recalled that "I dribbled to my left maybe two or three times, thinking 'What the heck am I going to do?' Then I realized the time was getting short. I just made a crossover and I pulled up." According to the Enquirer, Brown "eluded defender Darnell Burton and delivered the shot over the outstretched hands of Rodrick Monroe. The ball sailed through the net, beat the clock and ensured Xavier's 71–69 victory." Announcer Andy MacWilliams's call became a "signature part" of the game; after Brown's game-winning shot, he declared that "The UC Bearcats are No. 1 in the country, No. 2 in their own city!" That year, he helped them reach the NCAA Tournament while Xavier compiled a record of 23–6. He was named a Basketball Weekly honorable mention All-American for his performance.

After attending summer school to raise his grades to maintain eligibility, Brown returned to Xavier as a junior in 1997–98. He averaged 14.7 points per game as the Musketeers won the Atlantic 10 regular season title and their first Atlantic 10 tournament title. He posted 81 steals on the season, setting an Xavier record. He averaged 18.1 points as a senior in 1998–99, leading Xavier in scoring for the third time in his career. He was a nominee for the John R. Wooden Award and set a school single-season record with 104 three-pointers. He helped Xavier to the National Invitation Tournament (NIT) and was named to the NIT All-Tournament team; in his final career game, he scored a career-high 34 points. He started the final 112 games of his collegiate career and set Xavier career records for three-point shots made (236) and steals (242), while placing third in school history with 1,885 points. During his time at Xavier, he was named first-team All-Atlantic 10 twice (1997 and 1999) and second-team All-Atlantic 10 once (1998). He appeared in a total of 122 games and overall averaged 15.5 points per game, while Xavier compiled a record of 70–25 in his last three seasons. Brown graduated from Xavier in May 1999 with a Bachelor of Science degree.

== Professional career and later life ==
Considered small for a shooting guard, the position Brown played at Xavier, he switched to point guard in workouts prior to the 1999 NBA draft. He attended multiple pre-draft camps and worked out with the Orlando Magic and Chicago Bulls prior to the draft. He was not selected in the NBA draft, but later that year was chosen in the third round of the Continental Basketball Association draft by the Idaho Stampede. Instead of joining the Stampede, he signed with the Cincinnati Stuff of the International Basketball League in November 1999. In his first game, he helped the Stuff to a win by scoring 18 points in the second half. He ended up appearing in 62 games for the Stuff during the 1999–2000 season, starting nine while averaging 9.8 points. Afterwards, he played in Belgium for the 2000–01 season with Spirou Charleroi, averaging 12.4 points in seven games. He concluded his career in 2002 by playing one game with the St. Louis SkyHawks of the United States Basketball League (USBL).

After his basketball career, Brown worked at an alternative school in Wilmington until 2004. He was inducted into the Xavier Athletic Hall of Fame as part of the class of 2004. He later worked as a youth counselor, and as of 2015, Brown has nine children. In 2025, he was inducted into the Delaware Sports Museum and Hall of Fame.
