= Riverside, Missouri (disambiguation) =

Riverside, Missouri is a city in Platte County.

Riverside, Missouri may also refer to:

- Riverside, Jefferson County, Missouri, an unincorporated community
- Riverside, Reynolds County, Missouri, a ghost town
