= Riverside Cemetery =

Riverside Cemetery may refer to:

== United States ==
- Riverside Cemetery (Riverside, California), the original name of the Evergreen Cemetery in Riverside, California
- Riverside Cemetery (Denver, Colorado), listed on the National Register of Historic Places (NRHP) in Denver County
- Riverside Cemetery (Waterbury, Connecticut), listed on the NRHP in New Haven County
- Riverside Cemetery (Macon, Georgia), listed on the NRHP in Bibb County
- Riverside Cemetery (Moline, Illinois)
- Riverside Cemetery (Hopkinsville, Kentucky), home of Edgar Cayce's grave site
- Riverside Cemetery (Lewiston, Maine)
- Riverside Cemetery (Fort Fairfield, Maine)
- Riverside Cemetery (Yarmouth, Maine)
- Riverside Cemetery (Fairhaven, Massachusetts)
- Riverside Cemetery (Saddle Brook, New Jersey)
- Riverside Cemetery (Toms River, New Jersey)
- Riverside Cemetery (Apalachin, New York), listed on the NRHP in Tioga County
- Riverside Cemetery (Endicott, New York), listed on the NRHP in Broome County
- Riverside Cemetery (Lowman, New York), listed on the NRHP in Chemung County
- Riverside Cemetery (Long Eddy, New York), listed on the NRHP in Sullivan County
- Riverside Cemetery (Oswego, New York), listed on the NRHP in Oswego County
- Riverside Cemetery (Rochester, New York)
- Riverside Cemetery (Asheville, North Carolina)
- Riverside Cemetery (West Norriton Township, Pennsylvania), near Norristown, Pennsylvania
- Riverside Cemetery (Pawtucket, Rhode Island), listed on the NRHP in Providence County
- Riverside Cemetery (Jackson, Tennessee), listed on the NRHP in Madison County
- Riverside Cemetery (Oshkosh, Wisconsin), listed on the NRHP in Winnebago County
- Riverside Cemetery (Withee, Wisconsin)

== Canada ==
- Riverside Cemetery (Toronto) - part of Park Lawn Cemetery group

== See also ==
- Riverside Cemetery Chapel, Cleveland, Ohio, listed on the NRHP in Cuyahoga County
- Riverside Cemetery Gatehouse, Cleveland, Ohio, listed on the NRHP in Cuyahoga County
