= Spring Grove Cemetery Chapel =

Historic building in Hamilton County, Ohio

- U.S. National Register of Historic Places
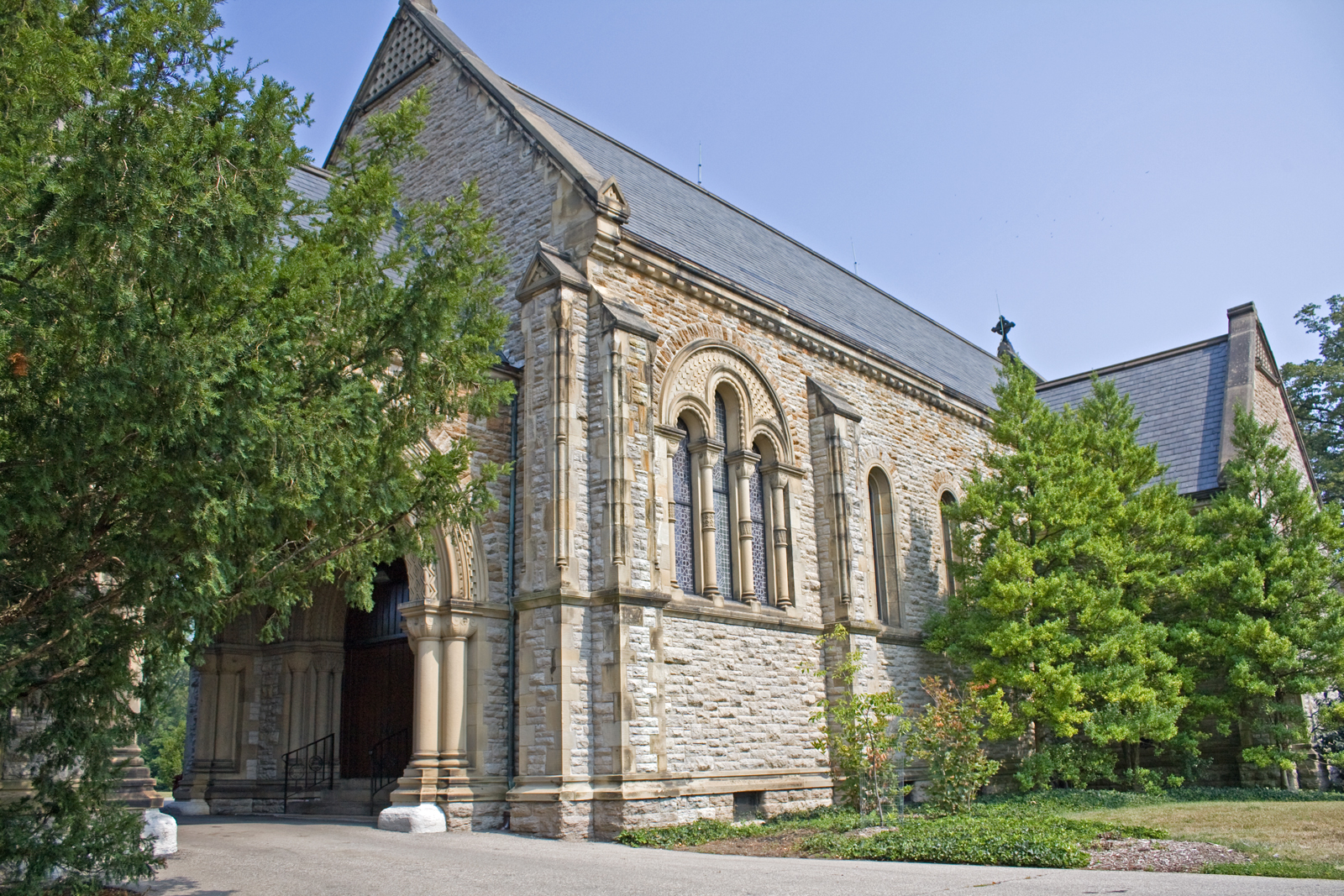
- Location: 4521 Spring Grove Avenue, Cincinnati, Ohio
- Coordinates: 39°9′49.98″N 84°31′25.00″W
- Architect: Samuel Hannaford
- Architectural style: Romanesque and Other
- MPS: Samuel Hannaford and Sons TR in Hamilton County
- NRHP reference No.: 80003086
- Added to NRHP: March 3, 1980

Spring Grove Cemetery Chapel is a registered historic building at Spring Grove Cemetery in Cincinnati, Ohio, listed in the National Register on March 3, 1980. It was designed by Samuel Hannaford and Sons.

== See also ==
- Oakwood Cemetery Chapel: Cuyahoga Falls
- Riverside Cemetery Chapel: Cleveland
- Wade Memorial Chapel: Cleveland
- National Register of Historic Places listings in western Cincinnati
