= Wade Memorial Chapel =

- U.S. National Register of Historic Places
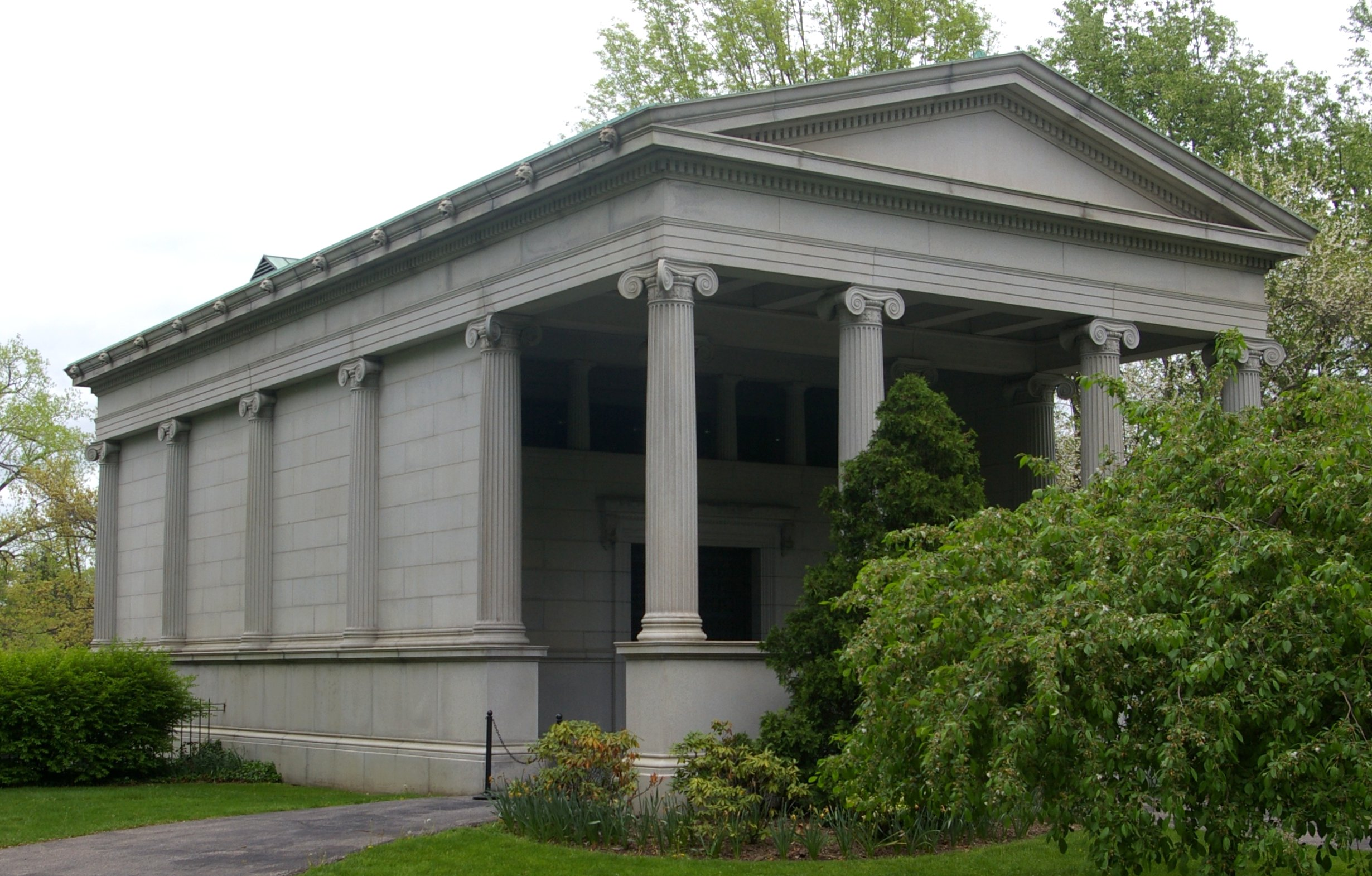

- Location within Cleveland Location within Ohio Location within the United States
- Location: 12316 Euclid Ave., inside Lakeview Cemetery, Cleveland, Ohio, U.S.
- Coordinates: 41°30′49″N 81°35′42″W
- Area: 0.3 acres (0.12 ha)
- Built: 1901
- Architect: Hubbell & Benes
- Architectural style: Neoclassical
- NRHP reference No.: 73001422
- Added to NRHP: June 18, 1973

Wade Memorial Chapel is a Neoclassical chapel and receiving vault located at Lake View Cemetery in Cleveland, Ohio, in the United States. It was donated to the cemetery by Jeptha Wade II in memory of his grandfather, cemetery and Western Union co-founder Jeptha Wade. The overall design was by the newly founded Cleveland area architectural firm of Hubbell & Benes, and was their first commission. The interior's overall design is by Louis Comfort Tiffany and was the only order of its kind which Mr. Tiffany had ever solicited. He said the designs would be "the effort of my life."

Wade Memorial Chapel includes a stained glass window of the Resurrection of Christ, along with mosaics of Old Testament prophets and Christian saints, in addition to several verses from the Bible. The mosaics include engravings of the works of mercy given by Jesus in Matthew 25. It is one of the very few surviving fully integrated Tiffany‑designed chapels, among a small number of complete ecclesiastical interiors created by Tiffany Studios that still exist today.

Wade Memorial Chapel was added to the National Register of Historic Places on June 18, 1973.

== Conception and siting of the chapel ==
In 1896, Jeptha H. Wade II decided to fund the construction of a new receiving vault and chapel, dedicated to the memory of his grandfather, at Lake View Cemetery. Wade asked the newly founded Cleveland architectural firm of Hubbell & Benes to create a preliminary design. He was so happy with their work that he did not ask any other firm for a design. He chose their concept as the final design for the chapel and told Hubbell & Benes to finalize it and create blueprints.

The Lake View Cemetery Association, which owned the cemetery, did not formally accept the new chapel until these plans were done.

The site selected for the chapel was between two existing lakes, diagonally across a road from the existing public receiving vault. There was a slight hill here, and the structure was designed so that the crypt level could not be seen from the driveway that led to the front of the chapel.

== Construction and cost ==
Ground for the new chapel was broken on February 19, 1898. The hillside was excavated 25 feet (7.6 m) down to bedrock, and the foundations and crypt level finished in late December 1898. Completing the interior took much longer than expected, and the chapel was not finished until 1901.

Jeptha Wade II placed no limit on the cost of construction. The cost was variously reported to be $350,000 ($13.5 million in 2025 dollars), $150,000 ($5.81 million in 2025 dollars), $140,000 ($5.42 million in 2025 dollars), and "more than $100,000" ($3.87 million in 2025 dollars). The cost of the window was not known, but was estimated at several tens of thousands of dollars.

Wade gave Joseph Carabelli, owner of a prominent local funerary monument firm, a $1,000 ($38,700 in 2025 dollars) gift in appreciation of his excellent work in executing the marble work in the chapel's interior.

== About the chapel ==
The modified Neoclassical building was T-shaped, with the rectangular chapel perpendicular to the rectangular crypt below. The exterior dimensions of the chapel are 33 feet (10 m) from side to side and 63 feet (19 m) from the front of the portico to the rear wall.

=== Exterior ===
The front of the chapel features a portico that extends somewhat further than usual from the chapel proper. The portico is supported by fluted columns with Ionic capitals. A low gable roof covers the chapel and portico, and features a pediment with an unadorned tympanum in front. The entablature has an featureless frieze, although the cornice is carved with dentils.

The exterior walls are clad in near-white Barre granite from Barre, Vermont. Jeptha Wade II wanted white terra cotta for the exterior, but this idea was abandoned when the architects pointed out that the surface of terra cotta could not be made completely smooth. The architects preferred white marble, both for its suitability for sculpture and because its white color more easily reflected the effects of light and shadow. Mr. Tiffany suggested using Georgia, Lee, Rutland, South Dover, and Tuckahoe marbles, but all of them had discoloration problems or chemical properties which led to discoloration, easy erosion, or pock-marking.

Wade asked for a longer-lasting stone, and the architects chose granite. Because granite could not be carved in fine lines, the architects abandoned most of the decorative scheme they had proposed for the exterior and increased the size of the blocks used in the exterior walls. A variety of granites were considered, including Concord, Hallowell, North Jay, Troy, Westerly, and Barre. Once more, color and chemical issues led to the rejection of most types of granites. (Hallowell granite was acceptable, but rejected as too expensive.) The final choice came down to Troy and Barre. The granite used is known as "light Barre" and as "standard Barre". It is a biotite granite with a very light bluish-gray color. It is very even-grained, with the texture ranging from fine to medium.

The granite came from the Standard Granite Quarries Co. quarry near Barre, Vermont, and was cut by Barclay Bros. Forty railroad cars were required to haul it to Cleveland. The order was so large and important to the Barre granite industry that quarry owner William Barclay traveled to Cleveland in late 1898 to consult with the architects.

Three engaged columns of Barre granite are half-embedded in the side walls, while partially embedded columns support each corner of the building. Two granite columns stand at the rear, and two on either side of the main entry door. The side and rear corner columns support 13-foot (4.0 m) long granite cross beams, which in turn support the ceiling.

=== Portico and vestibule ===
The portico is supported by four columns of Barre granite, standing on Barre granite pedestals. The granite stones of the portico floor weigh a combined 10 short tons (9.1 t), and the three steps leading from the carriageway to the portico are carved from a single stone.

Bronze doors lead from the portico to the vestibule, which was lined with white marble from Georgia. Countersunk in an architrave over the chapel doors are the words "Erected in Memory of Jeptha H. Wade by his Grandson, A.D. MDCCCC".

=== Chapel ===
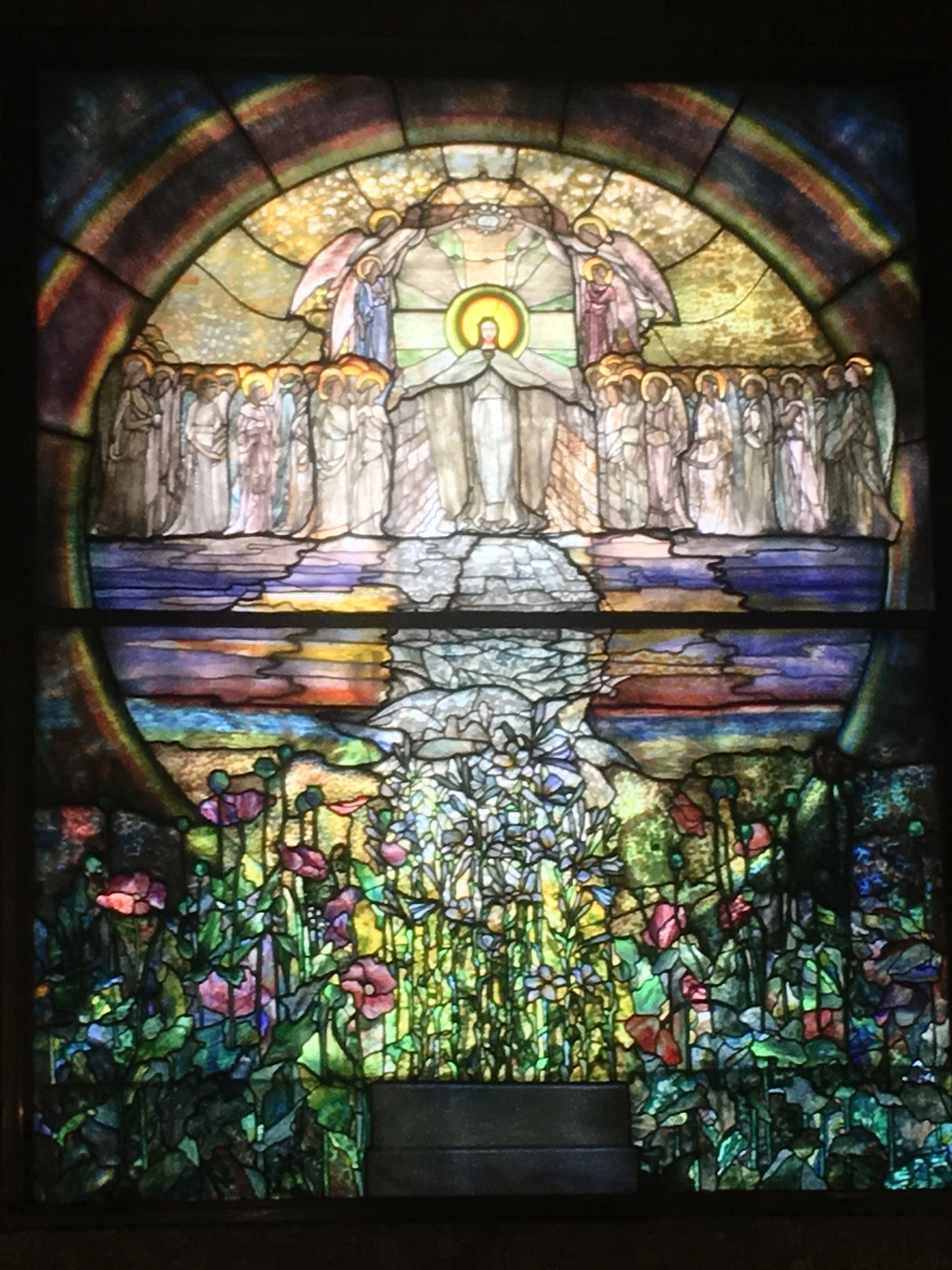
The Resurrection of Christ stained glass window

The chapel's interior measures 26 by 32 feet (7.9 by 9.8 m). The interior decor was designed and manufactured by Tiffany Glass & Decorating Company, and Louis Comfort Tiffany personally sought out the commission. After winning the project, Tiffany traveled to Cleveland to consult with Hubbell & Benes about the decor design. Art historian Hugh F. McKean concludes that Tiffany probably designed the interior himself, as many elements of the chapel reflect those used in Tiffany's chapel for the World's Columbian Exposition in Chicago in 1893.

The wainscoting and ceiling are both made of white marble from Georgia. The chapel features a massive stained glass window at the rear and mosaics on each side wall.

Portraying the resurrection of Jesus, the stained glass window, titled Resurrection of Christ, was designed by Tiffany artisan Agnes Northrop. It was exhibited at the Paris Exposition of 1900 before being installed at the chapel.

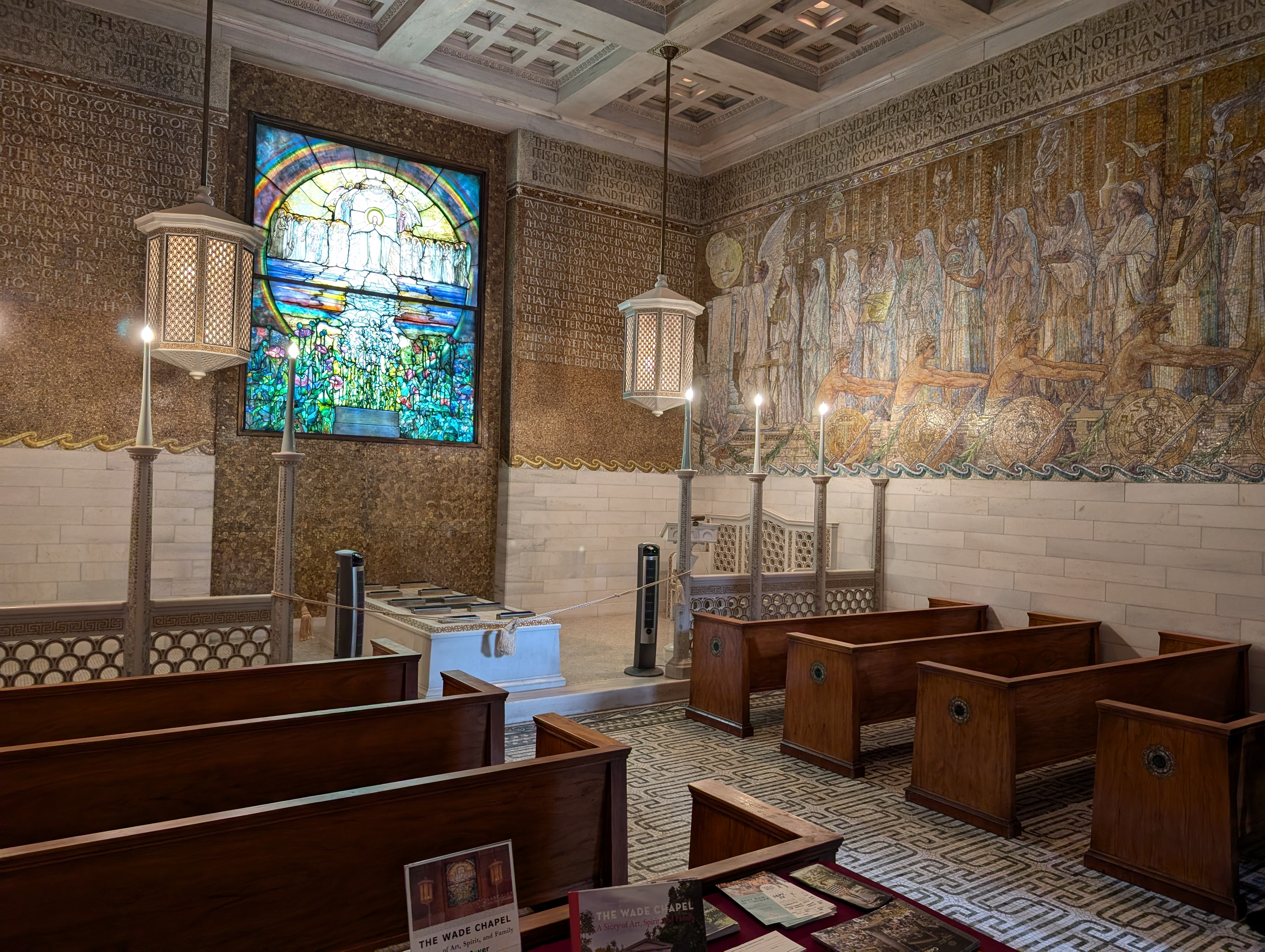
The interior of the chapel

Tiffany artist Frederick Wilson designed the wall mosaics, which were manufactured and installed by Tiffany & Co. Each mosaic is about 25 feet (7.6 m) long. Known under various titles, including An Allegory of the Christian Religion and The Voyage of Life, the Favrile glass and gold tile mosaics depicted the passage of life to death. The left side mosaic became known as "The River of Life", while the other had the title "The River of Death".

Other elements of the chapel include a white Carrara marble lectern, white marble candlesticks atop the chancel rail, and white mahogany pews. The sedilia, ceiling lamps, altar rail, candlesticks atop the altar rail, lectern, and casket pedestal are all made of white Carrara marble, often cut and carved with great delicacy and inlaid with colored glass, gold, and mother of pearl. Smaller clerestory windows of white frosted glass set in a heavy bronze grille are positioned above the chapel doors.

The chapel also features a casket pedestal behind the altar rail, in place of an altar. This pedestal can be lowered mechanically through the floor into crypt, where the receiving vault is located.

=== Crypts and receiving vault ===
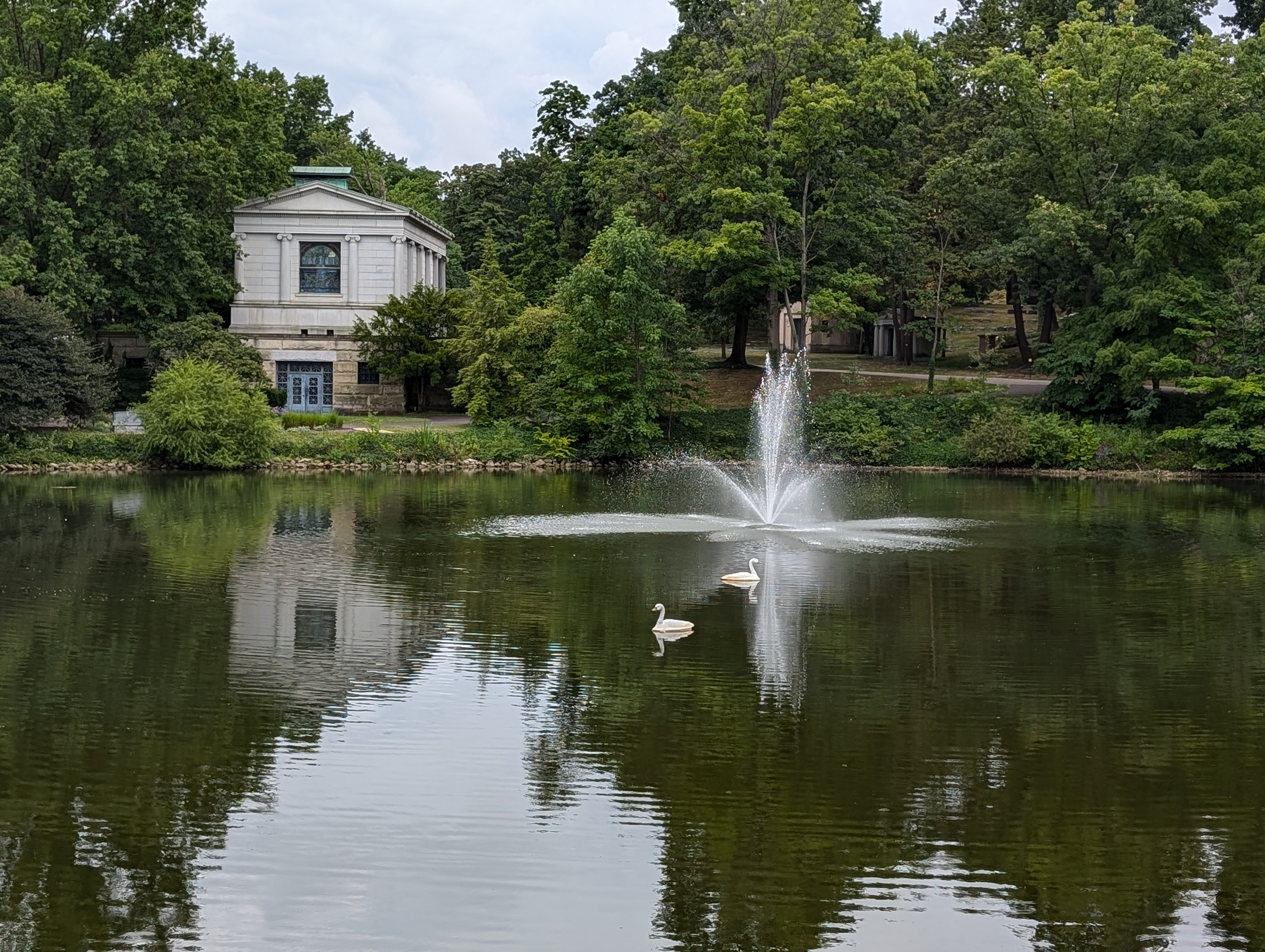
The chapel from the north, showing the lower level receiving vault

The rectangular crypt rests on a specially designed platform made of sandstone. The crypt is 63 feet (19 m) long.

The main facade of the crypt level features doors of bronze and windows barred with bronze grilles. Inside the crypt doors is an anteroom, from which a short corridor leads to the vaults. The "public" portion of the crypt can hold as many as 96 coffins. Two private receiving vaults also exist on the crypt level, closed off by marble doors. Each crypt is lined with Euclid bluestone (a bluish-colored sandstone quarried locally), while the cover of each crypt and all the interior walls of the crypt level are of white marble. Two small bronze grilles are set in each crypt cover, to ensure adequate ventilation. A ribbon of "subdued" colored stone, set at the height of a dado rail, provides the only color on the crypt level.

A short driveway gives access to the crypt entrance for the removal of caskets for burial.

== Critical assessment ==
An anonymous writer for American Stone Trade praised Wade Memorial Chapel in 1916 as an "exquisite Greek temple". The industry journal focused particularly on the chapel's construction, noting, "In every detail it is perfectly finished, permanently bedded and jointed and of material in every way suitable for the purpose for which it is used." Alice Gould Pattinson of the American Federation of Arts called Wade Chapel one of the most notable monuments at Lake View.

== See also ==
- Oakwood Cemetery Chapel: Cuyahoga Falls
- Riverside Cemetery Chapel: Cleveland
- Spring Grove Cemetery Chapel: Cincinnati
- National Register of Historic Places listings in Cleveland

== Bibliography ==
- Armstrong, Foster; Klein, Richard; Armstrong, Cara (1992). A Guide to Cleveland's Sacred Landmarks. Kent, Ohio: Kent State University Press. ISBN 9780873384544.
- Bolton, C.E. (1901). The Mayor's Message and Sixth Annual Reports of East Cleveland, Ohio. Cleveland: Imperial Press.
- Campen, Richard N. (1971). Architecture of the Western Reserve, 1800-1900. Cleveland: Press of Case Western Reserve University. ISBN 9780829501964.
- Dale, T. Nelson (1923). The Commercial Granites of New England. Bulletin 738. Washington, D.C.: U.S. Geological Survey, Department of the Interior.
- Eidelberg, Martin P.; Gray, Nina; Hofer, Margaret K. (2007). A New Light on Tiffany: Clara Driscoll and the Tiffany Girls. London: New York Historical Society. ISBN 9781904832355.
- Ellis, Lloyd H. Jr. (2012). A Guide to Greater Cleveland's Sacred Landmarks. Kent, Ohio: Kent State University Press. ISBN 9781606351215.
- Gilman, Daniel Coit; Peck, Harry Thurston; Colby, Frank Moore, eds. (1905). The New International Encyclopaedia. Volume 5. New York: Dodd, Mead & Co.
- Hubbell, Benjamin S. (September 1898). "Marble vs. Granite". Stone.
- McKean, Hugh F. (1980). The "Lost" Treasures of Louis Comfort Tiffany. New York: Doubleday. ISBN 9780385095853.
- Owen, Lorrie K., ed. (2008). Ohio Historic Places Dictionary. Volume 1. Hamburg, Mich.: State History Publications. ISBN 9781878592705.
- Rose, William Ganson (1990). Cleveland: The Making of a City. Kent, Ohio: Kent State University Press. ISBN 9780873384285.
