= St. Francis, Minnesota =

City in Minnesota, United States

St. Francis
- City
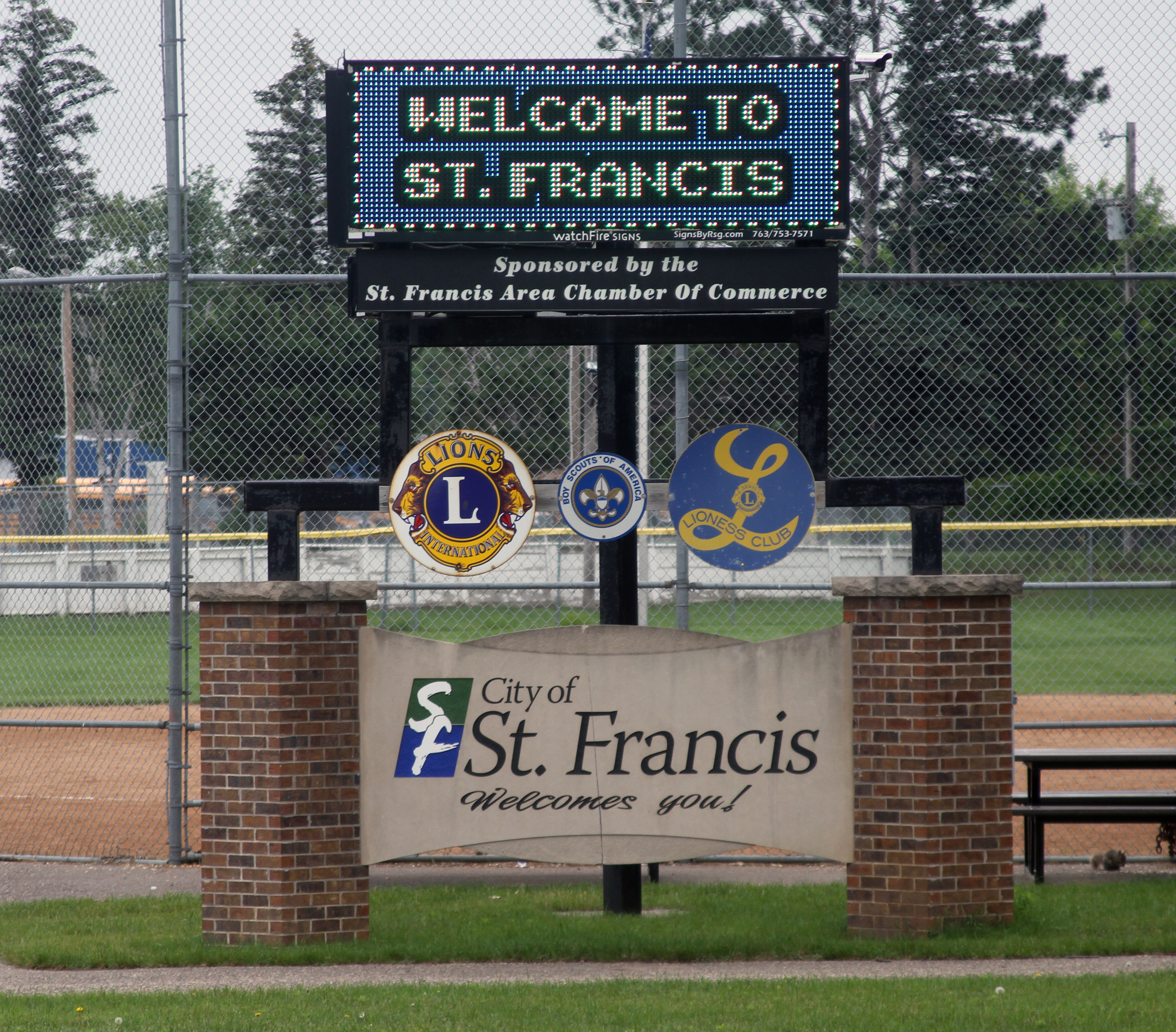
- Welcome sign at city border
- Coordinates: 45°23′44″N 93°23′12″W
- Country: United States
- State: Minnesota
- Counties: Anoka, Isanti

Government
  - Mayor: Mark Vogel

Area
  - Total: 23.75 sq mi (61.50 km^{2})
  - Land: 23.31 sq mi (60.38 km^{2})
  - Water: 0.43 sq mi (1.11 km^{2})
- Elevation: 922 ft (281 m)

Population (2020)
  - Total: 8,142
  - Density: 349.2/sq mi (134.83/km^{2})
- Time zone: UTC-6 (Central (CST))
  - Summer (DST): UTC-5 (CDT)
- ZIP code: 55070
- Area code: 763
- FIPS code: 27-56950
- GNIS feature ID: 2396487
- Website: https://www.stfrancismn.gov/

St. Francis is a city in Anoka and Isanti counties, Minnesota, United States. The population was 8,142 at the 2020 census.

Minnesota State Highway 47 serves as a main route in the city. Other routes include Ambassador Boulevard.

== History ==
St. Francis was named after Francis of Assisi.

In 1855 Dwight Woodbury built a dam, grist and saw mill, and the first house, which later became the Riverside Hotel. George Armsby and E. Fowler are considered the first settlers in the area.

St. Francis Township was settled in 1855 and organized in 1857. The name St. Francis comes from Louis Hennepin, who named the Rum River after Francis of Assisi in 1680.

The first doctor to practice in St. Francis arrived in 1857 and was known as Dr. Marshall. In the same year, school was started at the home of M. Fowler, and Hattie Waterhouse became the first teacher.

In 1869, Burns Township (Nowthen) broke off from St. Francis Township.

In 1879, a general store was started by Pelutiar McClure. In 1888, Dwight Woodbury built a large mill called St. Francis Milling Co. A starch and canning factory was built in 1893. In the early 1890s, Blanchette's Sample Room Beer Parlour opened, and was turned into an ice cream parlor when the school was consolidated. The ice cream parlor was run until the owner died in 1933. On July 18, 1933, the mill burned down and the dam was destroyed. By this time, there was also a blacksmith shop, drugstore, and a meat market that was later turned into a livery stable.

Pioneer Days started in 1964.

St. Francis was incorporated on May 16, 1962, and became a statutory city in 1974 when villages were removed as a subdivision in Minnesota.

== Geography ==
According to the United States Census Bureau, the city has an area of 23.97 square miles (62.08 km^{2}), of which 23.53 square miles (60.94 km^{2}) is land and 0.44 square miles (1.14 km^{2}) is water. St. Francis is in northwestern Anoka County.

Nearby places include Bethel, East Bethel, Oak Grove, Nowthen, Elk River, Zimmerman, Crown, and Isanti.

St. Francis is 16 miles (26 km) north of the city of Anoka. Lake George is nearby. St. Francis is just north of the Minneapolis–Saint Paul metropolitan area.

== Demographics ==
Historical population
Census	Pop.	Note	%±
1860	153		—
1870	166		8.5%
1880	270		62.7%
1890	324		20.0%
1900	483		49.1%
1910	519		7.5%
1920	589		13.5%
1930	510		−13.4%
1940	510		0.0%
1950	447		−12.4%
1960	525		17.4%
1970	897		70.9%
1980	1,184		32.0%
1990	2,538		114.4%
2000	4,910		93.5%
2010	7,218		47.0%
2020	8,142		12.8%
U.S. Decennial Census; 2012 Estimate

=== 2020 census ===
As of the 2020 census, St. Francis had a population of 8,142. The median age was 35.2 years. 28.1% of residents were under the age of 18 and 9.7% of residents were 65 years of age or older. For every 100 females there were 102.4 males, and for every 100 females age 18 and over there were 100.2 males age 18 and over.

60.8% of residents lived in urban areas, while 39.2% lived in rural areas.

There were 2,877 households in St. Francis, of which 40.7% had children under the age of 18 living in them. Of all households, 54.8% were married-couple households, 15.6% were households with a male householder and no spouse or partner present, and 19.0% were households with a female householder and no spouse or partner present. About 18.6% of all households were made up of individuals and 5.9% had someone living alone who was 65 years of age or older.

There were 2,963 housing units, of which 2.9% were vacant. The homeowner vacancy rate was 1.5% and the rental vacancy rate was 1.9%.

Racial composition as of the 2020 census
Race	Number	Percent
White	7,226	88.7%
Black or African American	102	1.3%
American Indian and Alaska Native	48	0.6%
Asian	120	1.5%
Native Hawaiian and Other Pacific Islander	0	0.0%
Some other race	120	1.5%
Two or more races	526	6.5%
Hispanic or Latino (of any race)	254	3.1%

=== 2010 census ===
As of the census of 2010, there were 7,218 people, 2,520 households, and 1,913 families residing in the city. The population density was 306.8 inhabitants per square mile (118.5/km^{2}). There were 2,650 housing units at an average density of 112.6 units per square mile (43.5 units/km^{2}). The racial makeup of the city was 95.9% White, 0.6% African American, 0.4% Native American, 0.8% Asian, 0.2% from other races, and 2.0% from two or more races. Hispanic or Latino of any race were 1.4% of the population.

There were 2,520 households, of which 46.7% had children under the age of 18 living with them, 55.6% were married couples living together, 13.8% had a female householder with no husband present, 6.5% had a male householder with no wife present, and 24.1% were non-families. 17.8% of all households were made up of individuals, and 4% had someone living alone who was 65 years of age or older. The average household size was 2.86 and the average family size was 3.22.

The median age in the city was 31.5 years. 31.7% of residents were under the age of 18; 8.1% were between the ages of 18 and 24; 32.8% were from 25 to 44; 20.8% were from 45 to 64; and 6.5% were 65 years of age or older. The gender makeup of the city was 49.5% male and 50.5% female.

=== 2000 census ===
As of 2000 the median income for a household in the city was $51,982, and the median income for a family was $52,193. Males had a median income of $40,585 versus $28,112 for females. The per capita income for the city was $19,957. About 3.0% of families and 4.8% of the population were below the poverty line, including 4.4% of those under age 18 and 5.0% of those age 65 or over.

== Organizations ==
- St. Francis is the current home of the Land of Lakes Choirboys.

== Notable people ==
- Kiana Eide, rhythmic gymnast
- Dakotah Lindwurm, long distance runner and Olympian
- Sean Sherk, mixed martial artist

== See also ==
- H. G. Leathers House
- Riverside Hotel (St. Francis, Minnesota)
