= Riverfront Stadium (disambiguation) =

Riverfront Stadium was a multi-purpose stadium in Cincinnati, Ohio, U.S. (demolished in 2002)

Riverfront Stadium may also refer to:

- Bears & Eagles Riverfront Stadium, Newark, New Jersey (demolished in 2019)
- Riverfront Stadium (Waterloo), Waterloo, Iowa
- Riverfront Stadium (Tampa), Tampa, Florida

== See also ==
- Riverside Stadium (disambiguation)
