= Oakwood Cemetery Chapel (Cuyahoga Falls, Ohio) =

Historic site in Summit County, Ohio, US

- U.S. National Register of Historic Places
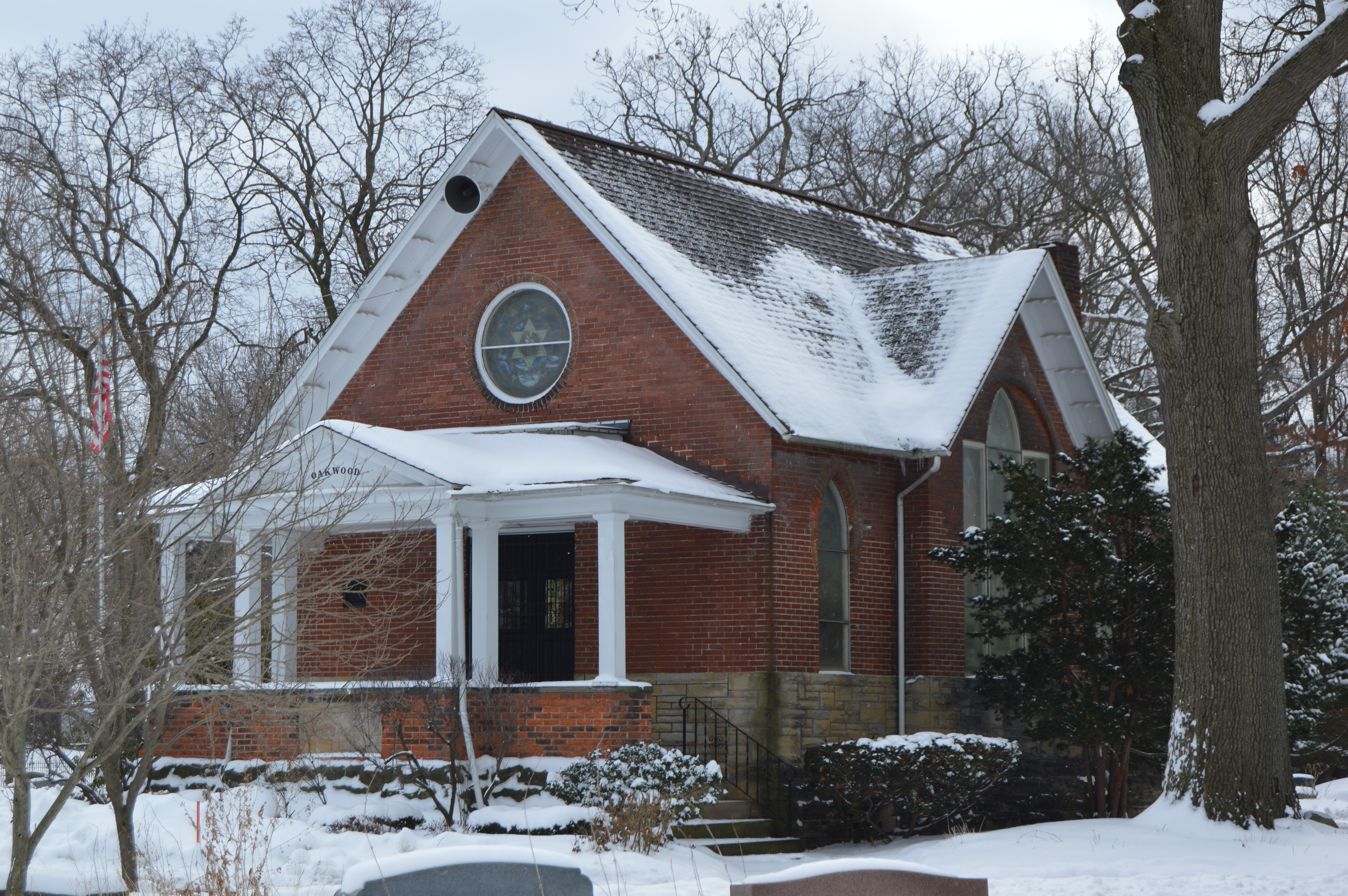

- Location within Ohio Location within the United States
- Location: 2420 Oakwood Dr., Cuyahoga Falls, Ohio
- Coordinates: 41°08′35″N 81°29′17″W
- Area: less than one acre
- Built: 1898
- Built by: Reed Deeds, Reed
- Architect: Leroy C. Herrick
- Architectural style: Gothic, Colonial Revival
- NRHP reference No.: 99001334
- Added to NRHP: November 12, 1999

Oakwood Cemetery Chapel is a historic chapel at 2420 Oakwood Drive in Cuyahoga Falls, Ohio.

It was built in 1898 and added to the National Register in 1999.

== See also ==
- Riverside Cemetery Chapel: Cleveland
- Spring Grove Cemetery Chapel: Cincinnati
- Wade Memorial Chapel: Cleveland
- National Register of Historic Places listings in Summit County, Ohio
