= Riverside Hotel =

Riverside Hotel may refer to:

- Riverside Hotel (Clarksdale, Mississippi)
- Riverside Hotel (St. Francis, Minnesota), listed on the NRHP in Minnesota
- Riverside Hotel (Reno), listed on the NRHP in Nevada
- "Riverside Hotel", a 1984 song by S. Kiyotaka & Omega Tribe

== See also ==
- Riverside Inn (disambiguation)
