= Land of Lakes Choirboys =

Nonprofit boys choir organization based in Elk River, Minnesota, U.S.

The Land of Lakes Choirboys logo.

The Land of Lakes Choirboys was a nonprofit boys choir organization based in Elk River, Minnesota. Consisting of four individual choir ensembles, the organization performed in local, national, and international locations. Known for singing works of various musicians such as Bach and Antonio Vivaldi, the choristers sang both religious and secular music.

== History ==
Land of Lakes Choirboys was founded by Craig Carmody-Anderson in 1976. It consisted of a single choir and depended on the community and a school building to support choir events. It started with eighteen members and was conducted by Anderson. The choir bought several acres of land and an old schoolhouse building near Elk River, Minnesota in 1991. This is where the organization functioned, holding its choir rehearsals and activities.

Francis Stockwell was hired as conductor. Stockwell was a music director at a school in Switzerland and had experience working with the Vienna Boys' Choir. The Choir then established a second ensemble that was used to train choristers until they were invited into the touring choir. Anderson directed the training choir while Stockwell directed the touring choir.

In 2002, the State of Minnesota ordered the condemnation of the choir's land to construct a highway overpass. Rehearsals and activities were temporarily held inside a local church building until the choir purchased a facility near St. Francis, Minnesota. Through time, the choir grew large enough for the organization to hire Aaron Carpenter. Carpenter took the direction of two new training choirs and later the national touring choir.

In February 2010, one of their former choirboys took over as executive director. P.J. Fanberg was a choirboy from 1994 to 1997. In the winter of 2011, Stockwell and Anderson left the group. After the departure of Stockwell, associate director Aaron Carpenter was promoted to the position of artistic director. Carpenter then brought on two associate directors, Corinne Anderson and Taylor Quinn. In 2013, the choir sold its property in St. Francis and moved back into the heart of Elk River, MN now sharing a rehearsal and office space with Elk River Lutheran Church on Main Street. Carpenter also was appointed executive director to replace the outgoing Fanberg. In 2018, Quinn left.

In 2020 the choir was greatly impacted by the COVID-19 pandemic. The Elk River Lutheran Church was closed during the early months of the pandemic which forced the choir to rehearse online. In July 2021 Aaron Carpenter accepted a position with the St. John's Boys’ Choir based in Collegeville, Minnesota. Nathan Herfindahl was named as the artistic director for the choir in August 2021. He served in this position for the 46th season of the choir.

In July 2022, the choir board of directors informed the families and staff that the 46th season would be the final season for the choir. The August 2022 Timber Bay camp was canceled and refunds were issued. The choir was formally dissolved over several months.

== Ensembles ==
=== Training choirs ===
- The Prep Choir (Cantare) was the first, but optional stage in vocal training. This choir was for boys aged five, six, and seven.
- The Training Choir (Cantanti) is for boys aged 8–12.

=== Touring Choirs ===
- The Concert Choir (Concertare) is for boys aged 8–18.

=== For the Man's Voice ===
- Land of Lakes Men's Chorus (Cambiata), was for boys from previous choirs whose voices have changed, as well as their fathers and men from the community.

== Awards ==
- The only boys’ choir outside of Germany to have received the honor of opening the International Bach Festival in Ratingen, Germany, in June 1999, with a full concert.
- Winner of the 2004 International Trebby Award for 'Best Boys’ Choir Album” with its CD Steal Away.
- 2006 Grand Champion of Cruise Festivals Music Festivals.
- Winner of the Gold diploma in the qualifying around in Category 1 (Children's choirs) at the 5th World Choir Games in Graz, Austria; July, 2008
- Winner of the Gold diploma in the qualifying around in Category 17 (Sacred Music) at the 5th World Choir Games in Graz, Austria; July, 2008
- Winner of the silver medal in the competition round in Category 1 (Children's choirs) at the 5th World Choir Games in Graz, Austria; July, 2008
- Winner of the silver medal in the competition round in Category 17 (Sacred Music) at the 5th World Choir Games in Graz, Austria; July, 2008
- Inducted into the Minnesota Music Hall of Fame, the only Minnesota Children's Choir with such an honor; November, 2009
- 2010 Grand Champion of Cruise Festivals Music Festivals.
