= Creekside Village =

Creekside Village could refer to:

- Whistler Blackcomb
- W.G. Brown Building/Astro Hill Complex

== See also ==
- Creekside (disambiguation)
- Village (disambiguation)
