= Riverside, New York =

Riverside is the name of several places in the U.S. state of New York:

- Riverside, Buffalo, a neighborhood in Buffalo, New York
- Riverside, Steuben County, New York, a village
- Riverside, Suffolk County, New York, a hamlet and census-designated place
- Riverside, a hamlet in the Town of Unadilla, New York

== See also ==
- Riverside (house), a mansion on the Upper West Side of New York City
- Riverside Drive, a scenic north-south road on the Upper West Side of New York City
- Riverside (disambiguation)
