= Riverside Inn =

Riverside Inn may refer to:

- Riverside Inn (Cambridge Springs, Pennsylvania), hotel/dinner theater and listed on the National Register of Historic Places in Crawford County, Pennsylvania
- The Riverside Inn (Cranford, New Jersey)
- Riverside Inn (Lava Hot Springs, Idaho), listed on the National Register of Historic Places in Bannock County, Idaho
- Riverside Inn (Leland, Michigan), listed on the National Register of Historic Places in Leelanau County, Michigan
- Riverside Inn (Oderberg, Germany), historic guest house in Barnim county, north east of Berlin

== See also ==
- Riverside Hotel (disambiguation)
