= Riverside, New Jersey =

Riverside, New Jersey may refer to:

- Riverside Township, New Jersey, a township in Burlington County
- Riverside station (River Line), a light-rail station in Riverside Township
- Riverside, Hunterdon County, New Jersey, an unincorporated community in Readington Township
- Riverside, Paterson, New Jersey, a neighborhood in Passaic County

== See also ==
- Riverside (disambiguation)
