= Riverside Garden =

Riverside Garden(s) may refer to:

- Yanlord Riverside Garden in Changning District, Shanghai, China
- Riverside Gardens, Louisville in United States
- Fellows Riverside Gardens, public botanical gardens, Mill Creek Metro Parks system, Youngstown, Ohio
- University of California, Riverside Botanic Gardens in United States

or gardens in

- Riverside, California
- Riverside County, California
- Riverside Park (Manhattan), a waterfront public park on Upper West Side of the borough of Manhattan
- Riverside, Illinois

or as an alternate name of

- Greenfields, Western Australia
