= Riverside, New Mexico =

Riverside, New Mexico may refer to:

- Riverside, Eddy County, New Mexico, an unincorporated community on the Pecos River
- Riverside, Grant County, New Mexico, an unincorporated community on the Gila River
- Riverside, Lincoln County, New Mexico, an unincorporated community on the Rio Hondo
- Riverside, Rio Arriba County, New Mexico, a former village on the Rio Grande
- Riverside, San Juan County, New Mexico, an unincorporated community on the Animas River
