= Riverside, Indiana =

Riverside, Indiana may refer to:

- Riverside, Fountain County, Indiana, an unincorporated community
- Riverside, Indianapolis, a historical neighborhood
- Riverside, LaPorte County, Indiana, an unincorporated community in Dewey Township
- Riverside, Wells County, Indiana, an unincorporated community in Harrison Township

== See also ==
- Riverside Amusement Park (Indianapolis)
- Riverside Park (Indianapolis)
