= Riverside Mall =

Riverside Mall may refer to these shopping malls:

- Main Street Pedestrian Mall (Riverside, California)
- Riverside Mall (Mbombela), in Mpumalanga, South Africa
- Riverside Mall (Rondebosch), in Cape Metropole, South Africa
- Riverside Mall (Utica, New York), formerly operated by The Pyramid Companies

== See also ==
- Riverside Square Mall, in Hackensack, New Jersey
- North Riverside Park Mall, in North Riverside, Illinois
