= Riverside, Idaho =

Riverside, Idaho may refer to:

- Riverside, Bingham County, Idaho, a census-designated place in Bingham County
- Riverside, Bonner County, Idaho, a former settlement in Bonner County
- Riverside, Clearwater County, Idaho, an unincorporated community in Clearwater County
