= Riverside Cemetery Chapel =

Historic site in Cleveland, Ohio

- U.S. National Register of Historic Places
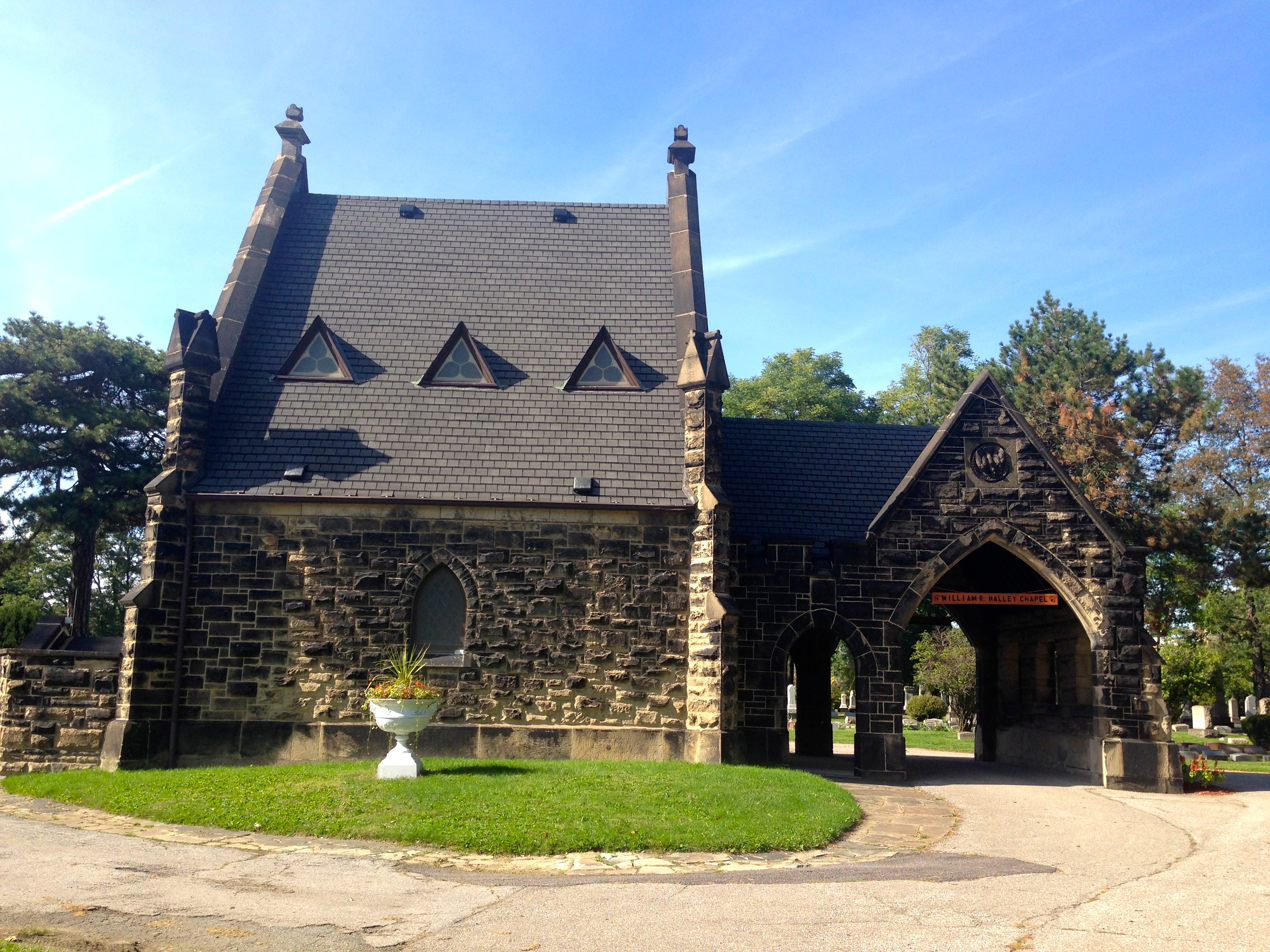

- Location within Cleveland Location within Ohio Location within the United States
- Location: 3607 Pearl Rd., Cleveland, Ohio
- Coordinates: 41°27′25″N 81°41′55″W
- Area: less than one acre
- Built: 1876
- Architect: Bruch & Monks
- Architectural style: Gothic Revival
- MPS: Brooklyn Centre MRA
- NRHP reference No.: 87000446
- Added to NRHP: March 19, 1987

Riverside Cemetery Chapel is a historic chapel located in Riverside Cemetery at 3607 Pearl Road in Cleveland, Ohio. It was built in 1876, received an addition in 1897, and closed due to disrepair in 1953. It was added to the National Register of Historic Places in 1987. It underwent a major renovation beginning in 1995, and reopened in 1998.

== Constructing the chapel ==
The Riverside Cemetery Association was formed on November 15, 1875. About April 1876, the association's trustees hired the Cleveland architectural firm of Bruch & Monks to design a chapel for the cemetery.

The chapel was to be erected at the center of the northern upper plateau of the cemetery, (Note: Riverside Cemetery consists of an expanse of ground atop a bluff overlooking the west bank of the Cuyahoga River. A steep ravine separated this into two plateaus. The larger of these was the northern plateau, which was the first area of the cemetery to be developed. The ravine led to a narrow valley which occupied the east-central and southeast areas of the cemetery.) which was the first area to be developed for burials. A 1,000-foot (300 m) long road, called Chapel Avenue, led east from the chapel to the cemetery's eastern boundary. A fountain (never built) was to anchor the eastern end of the road. The chapel itself was a Gothic Revival-style structure constructed of sandstone, with an interior measuring just 26 by 26 feet (7.9 by 7.9 m) square. Simple wooden pews faced forward, providing seating for between 80 and 90 persons. The chapel had a single above-ground story, with a full basement which served as a receiving vault. Coffins placed on the dais could be lowered into the receiving vault below mechanically. Narrow bunk-like racks provided space for the storage of coffins and human remains until the spring thaw. Up to 30 coffins could be stored in the receiving vault. Four narrow metal tubes rose from the basement through the north and south roofs to provide ventilation. (Note: The ventilation was needed to disperse the smell of decomposing bodies.) The building was unheated, and the only light was provided by small dormer windows set high in the roof.

Riverside Cemetery was opened on July 8, 1876, on a bluff overlooking the west bank of the Cuyahoga River in the unincorporated village of Brooklyn Centre (now a neighborhood which is part of Cleveland, but then an independent settlement). It was a garden-style cemetery, and at the time of its dedication the largest cemetery on Cleveland's west side.

Plans for the chapel were approved by the trustees on August 4, 1876, and construction proceeded immediately and swiftly. The chapel was dedicated on November 9, 1876. The cost of construction was $3,855 ($116,554 in 2025 dollars). A formal dedication of the cemetery took place on November 17, 1876. Ohio Governor (and President-elect) Rutherford B. Hayes attended the ceremony, planting a tree on Chapel Avenue.

== History of the chapel ==
On December 13, 1897, the cemetery trustees voted to approve the addition of a porte-cochère to the east side of the chapel. The Cleveland architectural firm of Steffens, Searles & Hirsh was hired to design the alterations, which also included adding a coal-fired furnace and coal room in the basement, a covered rear stairway at the rear of the building to give access to the basement, a dropped ceiling in the interior, (Note: The dropped ceiling covered over the dormer windows in the roof, rendering them useless.) and Gothic Revival lead glass windows in the north, south, and west walls. The porte-cochère was made of sandstone and designed to be almost stylistically identical to the existing chapel. Medallions were installed over the arches in the porte-cochère. The southern medallion depicted a descending dove with an olive branch in its beak, symbolic of peace and the Holy Spirit. The northern medallion depicted a hooded representation of Death, finger to the lips, urging all to be silent. (Note: The medallion is a near-replica of a work by a sculptor identified as "Brevet" at Père Lachaise Cemetery in Paris, France.) Construction began on July 7, 1898, and was complete on November 3 at a cost of about $2,700 ($104,490 in 2025 dollars).

In serious need of repair, upgrades, and restorations, the chapel was closed in 1953.

The chapel was added to the National Register of Historic Places in 1987.

In 1988, several stone roof caps were dislodged and fell to the ground just hours after the funeral of a cemetery trustee was held in the chapel. In 1992, realizing that the chapel was in danger of collapse, the cemetery began a $250,000 fundraising campaign to restore it to full use. A charitable foundation was established to receive monies. Although costs had risen to $285,000, by 1995 the cemetery had $105,000 in hand and decided to proceed with the renovation. The renovation was designed by the Cleveland architectural firm of Steven McQuillin & Associates. The restoration included restoring the building to use, removing a brick chimney on the building's west facade (added to vent smoke from the now-disused coal furnace), and removing the ventilation tubes from the roof (since the receiving vault was no longer used). Construction, overseen by Platt Construction Co. of Cleveland, began in the summer of 1995. William Halley, the cemetery's superintendent from 1971 to 2010, oversaw the fundraising and renovation. With the existing pews no longer serviceable, Halley obtained century-old pews for the chapel from Trinity Cathedral, a church also listed on the National Register of Historic Places which was renovating its nave. The renovation was completed in August 1998, and the chapel rededicated in June 1999. At that time, was named the William Halley Chapel in honor of superintendent William Halley.

== See also ==
- Riverside Cemetery Gatehouse
- Oakwood Cemetery Chapel: Cuyahoga Falls
- Spring Grove Cemetery Chapel: Cincinnati
- Wade Memorial Chapel: Cleveland
- National Register of Historic Places listings in Cleveland

== Bibliography ==
- Vigil, Vicki Blum (2007). Cemeteries of Northeast Ohio: Stones, Symbols and Stories. Cleveland: Gray & Co. ISBN 9781598510256.
