= River Bank (Jamaican song) =

Song
- Genre: Mento

"River Bank", also "River bank Coverly" and "River Bank Coberley", is a traditional Jamaican song. The song is an old Jamaican mento standard. It has been adapted both by Reggae musicians, and also by jazz musicians, such as trumpeter Baba Brooks who reworked "River Bank" into "Bank to Bank".

== Versions ==
- "River Bank Covalley", Louise Bennett, on Folkways Records, US 1957
- "River Bank", Baba Brooks, on Dutchess, Jamaica (released as "Bank to Bank" on Island, UK 1963)
- "River Bank Jump Up", Byron Lee and the Dragonaires, on Kentone Jamaica 1964 (released as "River Bank" on Parlophone, UK 1964)
- "River Bank Coberley Again" The Four Aces (Jamaican group), on Island, UK 1965
- "River to the Bank", Derrick Morgan, on Crab, UK 1968
- "River Bank", adapted by Headley Bennett, on Roots From The Yard, Jamaica 1978
- "River Bank", adapted by L. Carter, recorded by Prince Jazzbo, on Wild Flower, Jamaica 1975
- "River Bank", Randy's All Stars on Musicland, Jamaica 1970
