= Riverside, Ritchie County, West Virginia =

Riverside, West Virginia
- Unincorporated community
- Location within West Virginia Location within the United States
- Coordinates: 39°10′22″N 81°10′36″W
- Country: United States
- State: West Virginia
- County: Ritchie
- Elevation: 650 ft (200 m)
- Time zone: UTC-5 (Eastern (EST))
  - Summer (DST): UTC-4 (EDT)
- Area codes: 304 & 681
- GNIS feature ID: 1555486

Riverside is an unincorporated community in Ritchie County, West Virginia, United States. Riverside is located on the Hughes River, 2.5 miles (4.0 km) south-southwest of Cairo.
