= Riverside, Nebraska =

Coordinates: 41°05′58″N 96°21′20″W

Riverside is a ghost town in Burt County, Nebraska, United States.

== History ==
A post office was established at Riverside in 1870, and remained in operation until it was discontinued in 1875.
