= Riverside (album) =

Studio album by Dave Douglas, Chet Doxas, Steve Swallow and Jim Doxas
- Released: April 15, 2014
- Recorded: August 12 & 13, 2012; Humber College Recording Studios, Toronto, ON
- Genre: Jazz
- Length: 62:24
- Label: Greenleaf GRE-1036
- Producer: Dave Douglas and Chet Doxas

Dave Douglas chronology
Time Travel (2013)	Riverside (2014)	Present Joys (2014)

Riverside is an album by trumpeter Dave Douglas, saxophonist Chet Doxas, bassist Steve Swallow and drummer Jim Doxas which was released in April 2014 on Douglas' Greenleaf Music label. The group is inspired by the works of Jimmy Giuffre.

== Reception ==
Professional ratings
Review scores
Source	Rating
All About Jazz	4.5/5 stars

JazzTimes said "the most satisfying moments generally occur when Douglas is flexing his brawny tone and agile ideas to seize the spotlight or support his fellow horn player". On All About Jazz Troy Collins stated "Riverside pays homage to Giuffre's progressive concepts through the creation of new works that draw inspiration from his oeuvre, rather than merely rehashing it. The deceptive simplicity of folk-based themes, rich harmonic counterpoint and subtle rhythmic interplay are the basic foundations of Giuffre's aesthetic—aspects Riverside makes its own on this vibrant premiere".

== Track listing ==
All compositions by Dave Douglas except as indicated

1. "Thrush" - 6:41
2. "The Train and the River" (Jimmy Giuffre) - 2:27
3. "Old Church, New Paint (Intro)" (Chet Doxas) - 2:08
4. "Old Church, New Paint" (Doxas) - 4:29
5. "Handwritten Letter" - 6:07
6. "Big Shorty" (Doxas) - 6:48
7. "Front Yard" - 3:59
8. "Backyard" - 7:18
9. "No Good Without You" - 6:07
10. "Travelin' Light" (Trummy Young, Jimmy Mundy, Johnny Mercer) - 4:24
11. "Sing on the Mountain High/Northern Miner" (Doxas) - 11:56

== Personnel ==
- Dave Douglas - trumpet
- Chet Doxas - clarinet, saxophone
- Steve Swallow - electric bass
- Jim Doxas - drums
