= The RiverBank =

Former bank in America

- Company type: Public
- Industry: Financial services
- Founded: 1920 in Osceola, Wisconsin
- Defunct: October 7, 2011
- Fate: Receivership
- Successor: Central Bank, Stillwater
- Headquarters: Osceola, Wisconsin, United States
- Area served: Wisconsin and Minnesota
- Key people: Craig C. Danielson, CEO
- Products: Banking services, Insurance and Investments
- Number of employees: 179 (2008)
- Website: www.theriverbank.com

The RiverBank was an American bank offering banking, insurance and investment services in Wisconsin and Minnesota. On October 7, 2011 the Minnesota Department of Commerce shut down The RiverBank and subsequently the Federal Deposit Insurance Corporation (FDIC) was named Receiver. To protect depositors, the FDIC entered into a purchase and assumption agreement with Central Bank, Stillwater, Minnesota, to assume all of the deposits of The RiverBank.

== History ==
The RiverBank Osceola branch.

In 1894, Charles Oakey made a decision that Osceola needed to have a bank. Mr. Oakey planned the organization of a private bank and opened for business in the "Filzen Building," now known as "P.Y.'s." Charles' nephew, Harry Harding, joined him as a cashier and they managed The Bank of Osceola for the next four decades. In 1903, the bank became a state bank and corporation.

The demand for financial services increased to the point where another bank appeared practical, so Jean A. Sleeper seized the opportunity, organized a new bank and built a brick building for it across the street from The Bank of Osceola. The new Osceola State Bank opened to the public on October 21, 1916. Both banks prospered for several years, then came the Stock Market Crash, the Great Depression and the bank holiday. When order had been restored in late 1932, the two banks had merged. The bank was now under the leadership of Mr. B. J. Zimmerman, who had been with the Osceola State Bank since 1923.

In 1996, the bank, in response to industry changes, looked to expand its market area and purchased property in both St. Croix Falls, Wisconsin and North Hudson, Wisconsin. The bank looked to change its name to more closely align with its planned expansion in the St. Croix Valley. In August 1995, the Bank of Osceola became known as The RiverBank. The bank opened its first branch in St. Croix Falls in December 1995. The second branch facility was opened in North Hudson, Wisconsin in May 1998. Locations were then added in MarketPlace Foods and Somerset, Wisconsin and in Chisago City and Wyoming, Minnesota.

On October 7, 2011 the Minnesota Department of Commerce shut down The RiverBank after years of losses and concerns from the regulator of high concentration of land and land-development loans the bank had made in outlying areas of the Twin Cities. Subsequently the Federal Deposit Insurance Corporation (FDIC) was named Receiver. All deposits were moved to Central Bank, Stillwater, Minnesota.

== Locations ==
The RiverBank had locations in:

- Osceola, Wisconsin
- St. Croix Falls, Wisconsin
- MarketPlace Foods, located in St. Croix Falls, Wisconsin
- North Hudson, Wisconsin
- Somerset, Wisconsin
- Chisago Lakes, Minnesota
- Wyoming, Minnesota
