= Creekside =

Creekside may refer:

- The bank (geography) of a creek.

In Antigua and Barbuda:

- Creekside, Antigua and Barbuda, a village in Saint John

In the United States:

- Creekside, Kentucky, a city in Jefferson County
- Creekside, Pennsylvania, a borough in Indiana County
- Creekside (Morganton, North Carolina), an NRHP-listed house

In the United Kingdom:

- Creekside Discovery Centre, a regeneration area beside Deptford Creek in London, that is used for educational and artistic purposes

In Canada:

- a region of the Whistler Blackcomb ski resort, which was used for the 2010 Winter Olympics alpine events.
- Creekside Village (disambiguation), multiple uses

== See also ==
- Riverside (disambiguation)
- Creek (disambiguation)
- Side (disambiguation)
