= Riverside, Georgia =

Riverside, Georgia may refer to:

- Riverside, Colquitt County, Georgia, a former town
- Riverside, Atlanta, a neighborhood
- Riverside (Fort Benning, Georgia), a historic house
- Riverside (Toccoa, Georgia), a registered historic place in Stephens County
