= Ishiura =

Ishiura (written: 石浦) is a Japanese surname. Notable people with the surname include:

- Hiroaki Ishiura (石浦 宏明; born 1981), Japanese racing driver
- Ishiura Shikanosuke (石浦 鹿介; born 1990), retired Japanese sumo wrestler
- Taiga Ishiura (石浦 大雅; born 2001), Japanese footballer
- Tomomi Ishiura (born 1988), Japanese para-swimmer
