= Riverside Theatre =

Riverside Theatre or Riverside Theater may refer to:

== United States ==
- FIVE (music venue), formerly known as Riverside Theater, Jacksonville, Florida
- Fox Performing Arts Center, formerly known as Fox Riverside Theater, Riverside, California
- Riverside Theater (Milwaukee), Wisconsin
- Riverside Theatre (Iowa), Iowa
- Riverside Theatre (Vero Beach), see Interstate 95 in Florida

== Other countries ==
- Riverside Theatre, Coleraine, Northern Ireland
- Riverside Theatres Parramatta, Australia
