= Riverside, Maryland =

There are two locations with the name Riverside, Maryland:

- Riverside, Charles County, Maryland, an unincorporated community
- Riverside, Harford County, Maryland, a census-designated place
