= Riverside Stadium (disambiguation) =

Riverside Stadium is an association football venue in Middlesbrough, England.

Riverside Stadium may also refer to:

- Riverside Stadium, Drumahoe, an association football venue in Northern Ireland
- Riverside Stadium (Victoria), a baseball venue in Victoria, Texas, United States
- Riverside Stadium (Washington, D.C.), a demolished multi-purpose sports arena with a roller rink in Washington, D.C.
- FNB Field, formerly Riverside Stadium, a baseball venue in Harrisburg, Pennsylvania, United States

== See also ==
- Riverside Ground, a cricket venue in Chester-le-Street, England
- Riverfront Stadium (disambiguation)
