= Riverside, Kanawha County, West Virginia =

Riverside, West Virginia
- Unincorporated community
- Location within West Virginia Location within the United States
- Coordinates: 38°12′25″N 81°24′19″W
- Country: United States
- State: West Virginia
- County: Kanawha
- Elevation: 636 ft (194 m)
- Time zone: UTC-5 (Eastern (EST))
  - Summer (DST): UTC-4 (EDT)
- Area codes: 304 & 681
- GNIS feature ID: 1555489

Riverside is an unincorporated community in Kanawha County, West Virginia, United States. Riverside is located on the north bank of the Kanawha River and U.S. Route 60, 1 mile (1.6 km) southeast of Glasgow.

The community most likely was named in reference to the nearby Kanawha River.
