= Riverside High School =

Riverside High School may refer to:

== United States (by state) ==
- Riverside High School in Decatur, Alabama
- Riverside High School (Lake City, Arkansas)
- Riverside Polytechnic High School, Riverside, California
- Riverside High School (Florida), Jacksonville, Florida
- Riverside Brookfield High School, Riverside, Illinois
- Riverside High School, in Oakland, Iowa
- Riverside High School (Mississippi), Avon, Mississippi
- Riverside High School (New Jersey), Riverside, New Jersey
- Riverside High School (Buffalo, New York)
- Riverside High School (Durham, North Carolina)
- Riverside High School (Williamston, North Carolina)
- Riverside High School (De Graff, Ohio)
- Riverside High School (Painesville, Ohio)
- Riverside High School (Albany, Oregon)
- Riverside Junior/Senior High School (Boardman, Oregon)
- Riverside High School (Tualatin, Oregon)
- Riverside High School, in Riverside Beaver County School District, Ellwood City, Pennsylvania
- Riverside Junior/Senior High School (Taylor, Pennsylvania)
- Riverside High School (South Carolina), Greer, South Carolina
- Riverside High School, in Decaturville, Tennessee
- Amon Carter Riverside High School, Fort Worth, Texas
- Riverside High School (El Paso, Texas)
- Riverside High School (Loudoun County, Virginia), Lansdowne, Virginia; postal address Leesburg, Virginia
- Auburn Riverside High School, Auburn, Washington
- Riverside High School, in Chattaroy, Washington
- Riverside High School (West Virginia), Quincy, West Virginia; postal address Belle, West Virginia
- Riverside University High School, Milwaukee, Wisconsin
- Riverside High School (Wyoming), Basin, Wyoming

== Other (by country) ==
- Riverside Girls High School, Sydney, New South Wales, Australia
- Riverside High School (Launceston), Launceston, Tasmania, Australia
- Riverside Secondary School (Windsor, Ontario), Windsor, Ontario, Canada
- Riverside High School, Vereeniging, Gauteng, South Africa
