= Riverside Cemetery Gatehouse =

Historic place in Cuyahoga County, Ohio

- Riverside Cemetery Building
- U.S. National Register of Historic Places
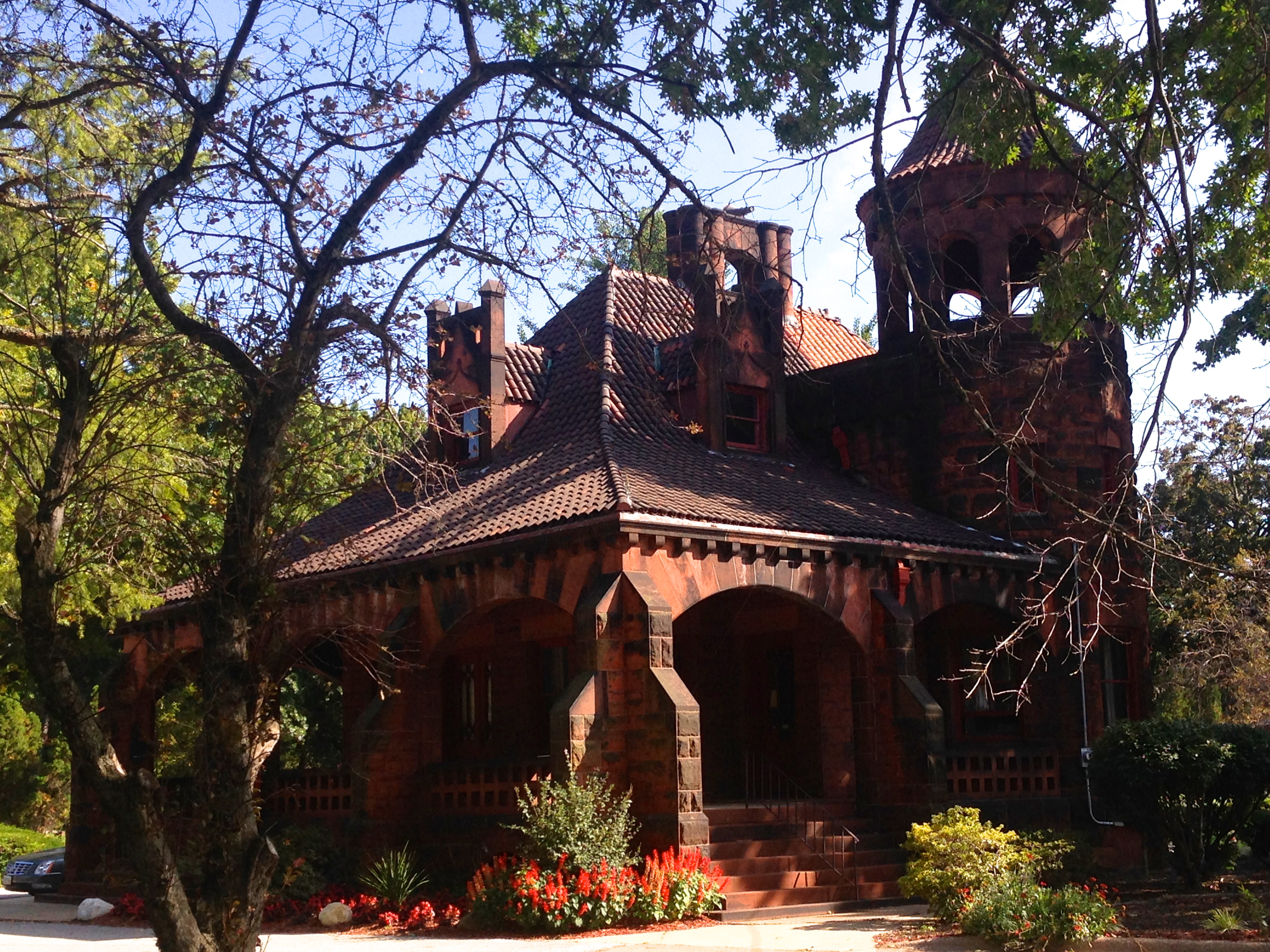
- Riverside Cemetery Gatehouse in 2014

- Location within Cleveland Location within Ohio Location within the United States
- Location: 3607 Pearl Rd., Cleveland, Ohio
- Coordinates: 41°27′25″N 81°41′55″W
- Area: less than one acre
- Built: 1897
- Architect: Charles W. Hopkinson
- Architectural style: Gothic Revival and Romanesque Revival
- MPS: Brooklyn Centre MRA
- NRHP reference No.: 87000445
- Added to NRHP: March 19, 1987

Riverside Cemetery Gatehouse is a historic office building located in Riverside Cemetery at 3607 Pearl Road in Cleveland, Ohio. It was completed in 1897, and added to the National Register of Historic Places in 1987. A significant interior renovation occurred about 1991 to 1992.

== Constructing the gatehouse ==
The Riverside Cemetery Association was formed on November 15, 1875. Riverside Cemetery opened on July 8, 1876, on a bluff overlooking the west bank of the Cuyahoga River in the unincorporated village of Brooklyn Centre (now a neighborhood which is part of Cleveland, but then an independent settlement). It was a garden-style cemetery, and at the time of its dedication the largest cemetery on Cleveland's west side.

As the cemetery was being laid out in 1875, the cemetery association constructed a wooden office building in the southwest corner of the property near the corner of Pearl Road and Willowdale Avenue. But as the cemetery grew, this structure proved too small for administrative needs. The cemetery's trustees approved construction of a new building at their annual meeting on December 9, 1895.

Noted local architect Charles W. Hopkinson was hired to develop the plans for the new building. The date on which Hopkinson was hired is not known, but he submitted plans to the cemetery trustees probably in April 1896. The trustees approved his plans on May 4. Hopkinson recommended that the building be constructed of granite. But granite was expensive, and the trustees asked the architect to re-estimate the cost using red brownstone (a building material popular at the time) instead. The difference was significant, and the trustees chose brownstone.

Construction contracts were let on June 30, 1896, and construction began on July 9, 1896.

The architectural style of the building has been variously described as "French château", Gothic Revival, and Romanesque Revival. One source called it a combination of Gothic Revival and Romanesque Revival. The structure consists of a steel beam frame with red-colored brownstone walls. The stone was quarried near Longmeadow, Massachusetts, and mortared with Portland cement. The base of the veranda which wraps around the building is poured-in-place cement. The building features a turret on the southwest corner that reaches beyond the roof, dormer windows on the second floor, and buttresses on all sides.

Construction was largely complete by the end of 1896, although interior work continued into early 1897.

The final cost of the building was variously reported as $18,000 ($696,600 in 2025 dollars), $19,000 ($735,300 in 2025 dollars), and $20,000 ($774,000 in 2025 dollars). (Note: Cemetery records show that the construction bids totaled $17,360, with another $868 going to Hopkinson for his work. The estimated total cost was, therefore, $18,228 ($705,424 in 2025 dollars).)

== About the building ==
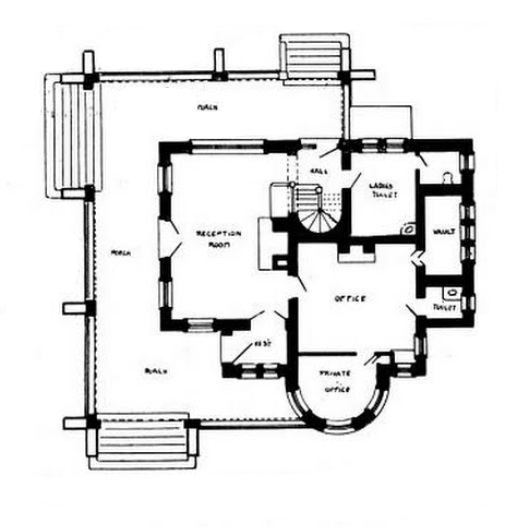
The original 1897 first floor plan for the gatehouse.

The Riverside Cemetery Gatehouse has two above-ground stories and a basement. As originally constructed, the first floor contained a reception room, office, fireproof vault, and a women's bathroom. The floors on the first floor reception room and women's bathroom were covered with mosaic tile. The reception room was the largest space on the first floor. It was roughly 16 by 22 feet (4.9 by 6.7 m) in size, with an arched, coffered, Tudor-style, 16-foot (4.9 m) high oak ceiling. The walls of the reception room were lined with 1.5-inch (3.8 cm) thick enameled brick in a warm yellow color. The reception room also featured a gas-fired fireplace with a wide mantel, and an "art window" made of 2,955 pieces of clear and stained glass. The office measured 18 by 25 feet (5.5 by 7.6 m). Its walls were tinted plaster, it had a ceiling panelled in oak, and it had oak flooring.

A narrow, winding staircase led to the second floor. Two meeting rooms existed on the second floor for the use of the trustees. With the exception of the first floor reception room and office, each of the rooms on the first and second floor were panelled with quarter-sawn oak. Chandeliers of Flemish brass lit the reception room, office, and both second floor rooms.

The basement consisted of closets and storage space, and contained a furnace room.

A 10-foot (3.0 m) wide veranda with a coffered roof supported by arches wrapped around the building on its north, west, and south sides. The roof was made of red Spanish-made terracotta tile, with copper flashing. A turret jutted 25 feet (7.6 m) above the second floor.

== History of the building ==
The building was originally lit by natural gas, but this was converted to electricity in the early 20th century. At some point, the ladies' bathroom was divided, so that a men's bathroom could be added.

Shortly prior to 1992, the gatehouse underwent a significant renovation. The ceiling in the office was covered by a dropped ceiling of sound-dampening tiles, and the north and east entrances to the building were closed off.

== See also ==
- Riverside Cemetery Chapel

== Bibliography ==
- Armstrong, Foster; Klein, Richard; Armstrong, Cara (1992). A Guide to Cleveland's Sacred Landmarks. Kent, Ohio: Kent State University Press. ISBN 9780873384544.
- Gregor, Sharon E. (2010). Rockefeller's Cleveland. Charleston, S.C.: Arcadia Publishing. ISBN 9780738577111.
