= Riverside, Delaware =

Unincorporated community in Delaware, United States

- Unincorporated community
- Location within Delaware Location within the United States
- Coordinates: 39°47′45″N 75°27′59″W
- Country: United States
- State: Delaware
- County: New Castle
- Elevation: 62 ft (19 m)
- Time zone: UTC-5 (Eastern (EST))
  - Summer (DST): UTC-4 (EDT)
- Area code: 302
- GNIS feature ID: 216858

Riverside is an unincorporated community in New Castle County, Delaware, United States. Riverside is located at the intersection of U.S. Route 13 Business and Harvey Road, southwest of Claymont.
