= Riverside, Reynolds County, Missouri =

Extinct hamlet in Missouri, U.S.

Coordinates: 37.238382°N 90.770398°W

Riverside is a ghost town in Reynolds County, in the U.S. state of Missouri.

Riverside was named for its location near the Black River.
