= Riverside Junior/Senior High School (Boardman, Oregon) =

Location
- 210 NE Boardman Avenue; Boardman, (Morrow County), Oregon 97818; United States
- Coordinates: 45.841341°N 119.697901°W

Information
- Type: Public
- School district: Morrow County School District
- Principal: John Christy
- Grades: 7-12
- Enrollment: 427 (2016-17)
- Colors: Columbia blue and black
- Athletics conference: OSAA Eastern Oregon League 3A-5
- Mascot: Pirate
- Rival: Umatilla
- Website: rhs.morrow.k12.or.us
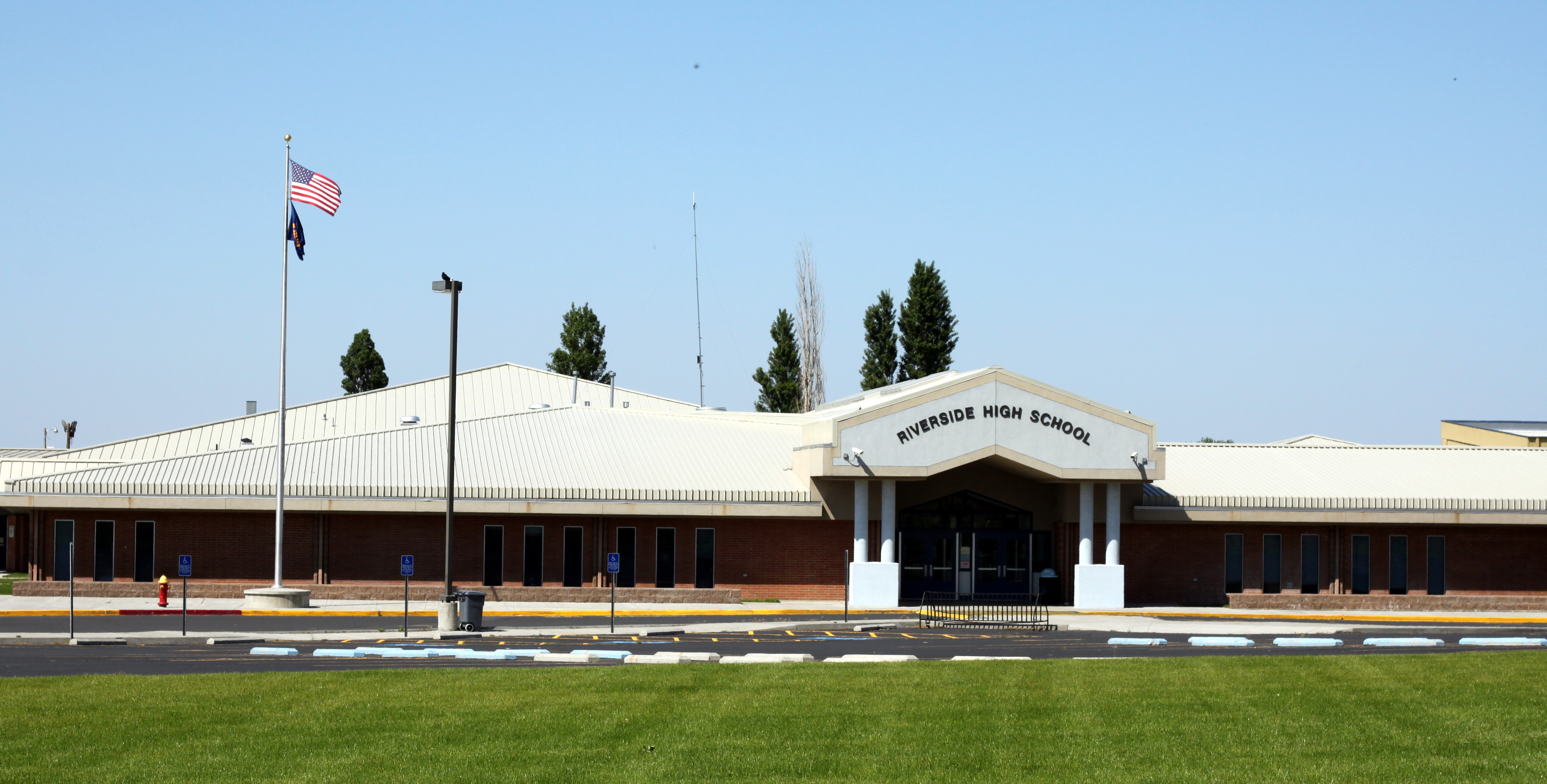

Riverside Junior/Senior High School is a public high school in Boardman, Oregon, United States.

== Academics ==
In 2008, 87% of the school's seniors received a high school diploma. Of 76 students, 66 graduated, two dropped out, and eight were still in high school the following year.

== Athletics ==
Riverside athletic teams compete in Oregon School Activities Association 3A-1 Lewis and Clark League.

=== State championships ===
- Boys Soccer: 2017
