= List of high schools in Minnesota =

This is a list of high schools in the state of Minnesota.

== Aitkin County ==
- Aitkin High School, Aitkin
- Hill City High School, Hill City
- McGregor High School, McGregor

== Anoka County ==
- Andover High School, Andover
- Anoka High School, Anoka
- Blaine High School, Blaine
- Bridges School, Andover
- Centennial High School, Circle Pines
- Columbia Heights High School, Columbia Heights
- Coon Rapids High School, Coon Rapids
- Fridley High School, Fridley
- Legacy Christian Academy, Andover
- PACT Charter School, Ramsey
- Paladin Career and Technical High School, Blaine
- Saint Francis Christian School, St. Francis
- Saint Francis High School, St. Francis
- Spring Lake Park High School, Spring Lake Park
- Totino-Grace High School, Fridley
- Woodcrest Baptist Academy, Fridley

== Becker County ==
- Detroit Lakes High School, Detroit Lakes
- Frazee High School, Frazee
- Lake Park Audubon Secondary School, Lake Park

== Beltrami County ==
- Bemidji High School, Bemidji
- Blackduck High School, Blackduck
- Red Lake High School, Red Lake

== Benton County ==
- Foley High School, Foley
- Sauk Rapids-Rice High School, Sauk Rapids

== Big Stone County ==
- Clinton-Graceville-Beardsley High School, Graceville
- Ortonville High School, Ortonville

== Blue Earth County ==
- Immanuel Lutheran School, Mankato
- Lake Crystal Wellcome Memorial Secondary School, Lake Crystal
- Loyola Catholic School, Mankato
- Mankato East High School, Mankato
- Mankato West High School, Mankato
- Maple River High School, Mapleton
- RiverBend Academy Charter School, Mankato
- St. Clair High School, St. Clair

== Brown County ==
- Cathedral High School, New Ulm
- Comfrey Public School, Comfrey
- New Ulm High School, New Ulm
- St. Mary's High School, Sleepy Eye
- Sleepy Eye High School, Sleepy Eye
- Springfield High School, Springfield

== Carlton County ==
- Barnum High School, Barnum
- Carlton High School, Carlton
- Cloquet High School, Cloquet
- Cromwell-Wright High School, Cromwell
- Lincoln High School, Esko
- Moose Lake High School, Moose Lake
- Wrenshall High School, Wrenshall

== Carver County ==
- Central High School, Norwood
- Chanhassen High School, Chanhassen
- Chaska High School, Chaska
- Holy Family Catholic High School, Victoria
- Integrated Arts Academy, Chaska
- Lutheran High School, Mayer
- Southwest Christian High School, Chaska
- Waconia High School, Waconia
- Watertown-Mayer High School, Watertown

== Cass County ==
- Cass Lake-Bena Secondary School, Cass Lake
- Northland Secondary School, Remer
- Pillager Area Charter School, Pillager
- Pillager Secondary School, Pillager
- Pine River-Backus Secondary School, Pine River
- Walker-Hackensack-Akeley Secondary School, Walker

== Chippewa County ==
- MACCRAY High School, Clara City
- Montevideo Senior High School, Montevideo

== Chisago County ==
- Chisago Lakes Baptist School, Chisago City
- Chisago Lakes High School, Lindstrom
- North Branch Area High School, North Branch
- Rush City Secondary School, Rush City

== Clay County ==
- Barnesville Secondary School, Barnesville
- Dilworth-Glyndon-Felton Senior School, Glyndon
- Hawley Secondary School, Hawley
- Moorhead High School, Moorhead
- Park Christian School, Moorhead
- Ulen-Hitterdal Secondary School, Ulen

== Clearwater County ==
- Bagley High School, Bagley
- Clearbrook-Gonvick Secondary School, Clearbrook

== Cook County ==
- Cook County Senior School, Grand Marais

== Cottonwood County ==
- Mountain Lake Christian School, Mountain Lake
- Red Rock Central Elementary ISD 2884, Jeffers
- Mountain Lake Public School, Mountain Lake
- Westbrook-Walnut Grove Senior School, Westbrook
- Windom Senior School, Windom

== Crow Wing County ==
- Brainerd High School, Brainerd
- Crosby-Ironton Secondary School, Crosby
- Lake Region Christian School, Baxter
- Pequot Lakes High School, Pequot Lakes

== Dakota County ==
- Apple Valley High School, Apple Valley
- Burnsville High School, Burnsville
- Christian Life School, Farmington
- Convent of the Visitation, Mendota Heights
- Eagan High School, Eagan
- Eastview High School, Apple Valley
- Farmington High School, Farmington
- First Baptist School, Rosemount
- Hastings High School, Hastings
- Two Rivers High School, Mendota Heights
- Lakeville North High School, Lakeville
- Lakeville South High School, Lakeville
- Randolph Secondary School, Randolph
- Rosemount High School, Rosemount
- School of Environmental Studies, Apple Valley
- St. Croix Lutheran High School, West St. Paul
- Saint Thomas Academy, Mendota Heights
- Simley High School, Inver Grove Heights
- South Saint Paul High School, South St. Paul
- Trinity School at River Ridge, Eagan

== Dodge County ==
- Hayfield High School, Hayfield
- Kasson-Mantorville High School, Kasson
- Triton Senior High School, Dodge Center

== Douglas County ==
- Brandon High School, Brandon
- Evansville High School, Evansville
- Jefferson High School, Alexandria
- Osakis Secondary School, Osakis

== Faribault County ==
- Blue Earth Area High School, Blue Earth
- Elmore Academy, Elmore
- United South Central Senior School, Wells

== Fillmore County ==
- Fillmore Central High School, Harmony
- Kingsland Senior School, Spring Valley
- Lanesboro Secondary School, Lanesboro
- Mabel-Canton Secondary School, Mabel
- Rushford-Peterson Senior School, Rushford

== Freeborn County ==
- Albert Lea High School, Albert Lea
- Alden-Conger High School, Alden
- Glenville-Emmons Senior School, Glenville

== Goodhue County ==
- Cannon Falls Area Schools, Cannon Falls
- Goodhue Secondary School, Goodhue
- Kenyon-Wanamingo High School, Kenyon
- Pine Island High School, Pine Island
- Red Wing High School, Red Wing
- Zumbrota-Mazeppa Senior School, Zumbrota

== Grant County ==
- Ashby High School, Ashby
- Herman Secondary School, Herman
- West Central Area Secondary School, Barrett

== Hennepin County ==
- Camden High School, Minneapolis
- Calvin Christian High School, Crystal
- Champlin Park High School, Champlin
- Edina High School, Edina
- Excel High School, online school with headquarters in Minnetonka
- Mound-Westonka Secondary School, Minnetrista
- Orono High School, Long Lake
- Osseo Senior High School, Osseo
- Robbinsdale Cooper High School, New Hope
- Rockford High School, Rockford
- Rogers High School, Rogers
- St. Anthony Village High School, St. Anthony
- Watershed High School, Richfield

=== Bloomington ===
- John F. Kennedy High School
- United Christian Academy
- Thomas Jefferson High School

=== Brooklyn Center ===
- Brooklyn Center High School
- SAGE Academy Charter School

=== Brooklyn Park ===
- Maranatha Christian Academy
- Park Center Senior High School

=== Eden Prairie ===
- Eagle Ridge Academy
- Eden Prairie High School
- The International School of Minnesota
- Mainstreet School of Performing Arts

=== Golden Valley ===
- Arts High School
- Breck School

=== Maple Grove ===
- Heritage Christian Academy
- Maple Grove Senior High School

=== Minnetonka ===
- Hopkins High School
- Minnetonka Christian Academy
- Minnetonka High School

=== Plymouth ===
- Fourth Baptist Christian School
- Northgate Academy
- Providence Academy
- Robbinsdale Armstrong High School
- Wayzata High School
- West Lutheran High School

=== Richfield ===
- Academy of Holy Angels
- Richfield High School

=== St. Louis Park ===
- Benilde-St. Margaret's School
- Groves Academy
- Saint Louis Park High School

== Houston County ==
- Caledonia High School, Caledonia
- Houston High School, Houston
- La Crescent Senior High School, La Crescent
- Spring Grove Secondary School, Spring Grove

== Hubbard County ==
- Laporte Secondary School, Laporte
- Nevis Secondary School, Nevis
- Park Rapids Senior School, Park Rapids

== Isanti County ==
- Braham Area High School, Braham
- Cambridge Christian School, Cambridge
- Cambridge-Isanti High School, Cambridge

== Itasca County ==
- Bigfork High School, Bigfork
- Deer River Secondary School, Deer River
- Grand Rapids High School, Grand Rapids
- Greenway High School, Coleraine
- Nashwauk Secondary School, Nashwauk
- Thistledew School, Togo

== Jackson County ==
- Heron Lake-Okabena High School, Okabena
- Jackson County Central Senior School, Jackson

== Kanabec County ==
- Mora Secondary School, Mora
- Ogilvie High School, Ogilvie

== Kandiyohi County ==
- New London-Spicer Senior School, New London
- Willmar High School, Willmar
- Central Minnesota Christian School, Prinsburg
- Community Christian School, Willmar

== Kittson County ==
- Kittson Central Secondary School, Hallock
- Lancaster High School, Lancaster
- Tri-County Secondary School, Karlstad

== Koochiching County ==
- Falls High School, International Falls
- Indus Secondary School, Birchdale
- Littlefork-Big Falls Secondary School, Littlefork
- Northome Secondary School, Northome

== Lac qui Parle County ==
- Dawson-Boyd Secondary School, Dawson
- Lac qui Parle Valley Secondary School, Madison

== Lake County ==
- Kelley Secondary School, Silver Bay
- Two Harbors Secondary School, Two Harbors

== Lake of the Woods County ==
- Lake of the Woods School, Baudette

== Le Sueur County ==
- Cleveland High School, Cleveland
- Le Sueur-Henderson Secondary School, Le Sueur
- Tri-City United High School, Montgomery
- Waterville-Elysian-Morristown High School, Waterville

== Lincoln County ==
- RTR High School, Tyler
- Hendricks Public High School, Hendricks

== Lyon County ==
- Lakeview Secondary School, Cottonwood
- Marshall Senior High School, Marshall
- Minneota Secondary School, Minneota
- Tracy High School, Tracy

== Mahnomen County ==
- Mahnomen Secondary School, Mahnomen
- Waubun Secondary School, Waubun

== Marshall County ==
- Grygla Secondary School, Grygla
- Marshall County Central High School, Newfolden
- Stephen-Argyle Central High School, Stephen
- Warren-Alvarado-Oslo Secondary School, Warren

== Martin County ==
- Fairmont Area High School, Fairmont
- Granada-Huntley-East Chain Middle/High School, Granada
- Martin County West Jr/Sr High School, Sherburn
- Martin Luther High School, Northrop
- Truman High School, Truman

== McLeod County ==
- Glencoe-Silver Lake Senior School, Glencoe
- Holy Trinity High School, Winsted
- Hutchinson High School, Hutchinson
- Lester Prairie Secondary School, Lester Prairie
- Maplewood Academy, Hutchinson

== Meeker County ==
- A.C.G.C. Secondary School, Grove City
- Eden Valley Secondary School, Eden Valley
- Litchfield Senior High School, Litchfield

== Mille Lacs County ==
- Faith Christian School, Foreston
- Isle High School, Isle
- Milaca Secondary School, Milaca
- Onamia Secondary School, Onamia
- Princeton High School, Princeton

== Morrison County ==
- Healy Secondary School, Pierz
- Little Falls Community High School, Little Falls
- Royalton Secondary School, Royalton
- Swanville Secondary School, Swanville
- Upsala Secondary School, Upsala

== Mower County ==
- Austin High School, Austin
- Grand Meadow Secondary School, Grand Meadow
- Leroy-Ostrander High School, Leroy
- Lyle Secondary School, Lyle
- Pacelli High School, Austin
- Southland High School, Adams

== Murray County ==
- Fulda High School, Fulda
- Murray County Central High School, Slayton

== Nicollet County ==
- Minnesota Valley Lutheran High School, New Ulm
- Nicollet Secondary School, Nicollet
- St. Peter High School, St. Peter

== Nobles County ==
- Adrian Secondary School, Adrian
- Ellsworth Secondary School, Ellsworth
- Worthington Senior High School, Worthington

== Norman County ==
- Ada-Borup Secondary School, Ada
- Norman County East High School, Twin Valley
- Norman County West Secondary School, Halstad

== Olmsted County ==
- Byron High School, Byron
- Century High School, Rochester
- Chosen Valley High School, Chatfield
- Dover-Eyota Secondary School, Eyota
- Faith Christian School, Rochester
- John Marshall High School, Rochester
- Lourdes High School, Rochester
- Mayo High School, Rochester
- Schaeffer Academy, Rochester
- Stewartville Senior School, Stewartville
- Studio Academy Charter, Rochester

== Otter Tail County ==
- Battle Lake High School, Battle Lake
- Fergus Falls Senior High School, Fergus Falls
- Henning Secondary School, Henning
- Hillcrest Lutheran Academy, Fergus Falls
- New York Mills Secondary School, New York Mills
- Parkers Prairie Secondary School, Parkers Prairie
- Pelican Rapids Secondary School, Pelican Rapids
- Perham High School, Perham
- Underwood Secondary School, Underwood

== Pennington County ==
- Goodridge Secondary School, Goodridge
- Lincoln Senior School, Thief River Falls

== Pine County ==
- East Central High School, Finlayson
- Hinckley-Finlayson High School, Hinckley
- Pine City High School, Pine City
- Willow River High School, Willow River

== Pipestone County ==
- Edgerton Secondary School, Edgerton
- Pipestone Area High School, Pipestone
- Southwest Minnesota Christian High School, Edgerton

== Polk County ==
- Climax Secondary School, Climax
- Crookston High School, Crookston
- East Grand Forks Senior High School, East Grand Forks
- Fertile-Beltrami Secondary School, Fertile
- Fosston Secondary School, Fosston
- Sacred Heart High School, East Grand Forks
- Win-E-Mac Secondary School, Erskine

== Pope County ==
- Minnewaska Area High School, Glenwood

== Ramsey County ==
- Academy for Sciences and Agriculture High School, Vadnais Heights
- Calvin Christian High School, Fridley
- Irondale High School, New Brighton
- Mounds View High School, Arden Hills
- North High School, North St. Paul
- St. Odilia School, Shoreview
- White Bear Lake Area High School, White Bear Lake

=== Maplewood ===
- Hill-Murray School
- Liberty Classical Academy
- Mounds Park Academy

=== Roseville ===
- Concordia Academy
- Fairview Alternative High School
- Roseville Area High School

=== St. Paul ===
==== Public Schools ====
- Como Park Senior High School
- Gordon Parks High School
- Harding Senior High School
- Highland Park High School
- Humboldt Senior High School
- Johnson Senior High School
- Saint Paul Central High School

==== Charter Schools ====
- Avalon School
- City Academy High School
- Community of Peace Academy
- Great River Charter Montessori School
- High School for Recording Arts
- Hmong College Prep Academy
- Jennings Experiential High School
- Nova Classical Academy

==== Private Schools ====
- Cretin-Derham Hall High School
- Saint Agnes High School
- Saint Bernard's High School
- St. Paul Academy and Summit School

=== Defunct schools ===
- Calvin Academy, Mounds View (closed)

== Red Lake County ==
- Lafayette High School, Red Lake Falls
- Oklee Secondary School, Oklee

== Redwood County ==
- Cedar Mountain Secondary School, Morgan
- Redwood Valley High School, Redwood Falls
- Red Rock Central ISD 2884, Lamberton
- Wabasso Secondary School, Wabasso

== Renville County ==
- BOLD Senior School, Olivia
- Renville County West Senior School, Renville
- Buffalo Lake-Hector-Stewart Renville

== Rice County ==
- Arcadia Charter School, Northfield
- Bethlehem Academy, Faribault
- Faribault High School, Faribault
- Minnesota State Academy for the Blind, Faribault
- Minnesota State Academy for the Deaf, Faribault
- Shattuck-Saint Mary's, Faribault
- Northfield High School, Northfield

== Rock County ==
- Hills-Beaver Creek Secondary School, Hills
- Luverne Senior High School, Luverne

== Roseau County ==
- Badger Community School, Badger
- Greenbush-Middle River High School, Greenbush
- Roseau Secondary School, Roseau
- Warroad Senior School, Warroad

== St. Louis County ==
- Babbitt Secondary School, Babbitt
- Cherry Secondary School, Iron
- Chisholm High School, Chisholm
- Cook Secondary School, Cook
- Floodwood Secondary School, Floodwood
- Hermantown Senior School, Hermantown
- Hibbing High School, Hibbing
- South Ridge High School, Culver
- Memorial High School, Ely
- Mesabi East High School, Aurora
- Mountain Iron-Buhl Secondary School, Mountain Iron
- Orr Secondary School, Orr
- Proctor High School, Proctor
- Virginia High School, Virginia

=== Duluth ===
- Denfeld High School
- East High School
- Harbor City International School
- Lake Superior High School
- Lakeview Christian Academy
- The Marshall School

=== Eveleth ===
- East Range Academy of Technology and Science
- Eveleth-Gilbert High School

=== Tower ===
- Tower-Soudan Secondary School
- Vermilion Country School

=== Defunct schools ===
- Albrook Secondary School, Saginaw
- Cotton Secondary School, Cotton
- Central High School, Duluth

== Scott County ==
- Belle Plaine High School, Belle Plaine
- Jordan High School, Jordan
- New Prague High School, New Prague
- Prior Lake Senior School, Prior Lake
- Shakopee High School, Shakopee

== Sherburne County ==
- Becker High School, Becker
- Big Lake High School, Big Lake
- Elk River High School, Elk River
- Ivan Sand Community School, Elk River
- Rivers Christian Academy, Elk River
- Spectrum High School, Elk River
- Zimmerman High School, Zimmerman

== Sibley County ==
- G.F.W. Senior School, Winthrop
- Minnesota New Country School, Henderson
- Sibley East High School, Arlington

== Stearns County ==
- Albany Senior School, Albany
- Apollo High School, St. Cloud
- Belgrade-Brooten-Elrosa High School, Belgrade
- Cathedral High School/John XXIII, St. Cloud
- Holdingford Secondary School, Holdingford
- Kimball High School, Kimball
- Melrose High School, Melrose
- Paynesville Senior School, Paynesville
- Rocori High School, Cold Spring
- St. John's Preparatory School, Collegeville
- Sartell High School, Sartell
- Sauk Centre Secondary School, Sauk Centre
- Technical High School, St. Cloud

== Steele County ==
- Blooming Prairie High School, Blooming Prairie
- Medford Secondary School, Medford
- Owatonna Senior High School, Owatonna

== Stevens County ==
- Chokio-Alberta High School, Alberta
- Hancock Secondary School, Hancock
- Morris Area Secondary School, Morris

== Swift County ==
- Benson High School, Benson
- Kerkhoven-Murdock-Sunburg Secondary School, Kerkhoven
- Lac Qui Parle Valley Middle/High School, Madison

== Todd County ==
- Bertha-Hewitt High School, Bertha
- Browerville High School, Browerville
- Eagle Valley Secondary School, Eagle Bend
- Long Prairie-Grey Senior School, Long Prairie
- Osakis High School, Osakis
- Staples-Motley High School, Staples

== Traverse County ==
- Wheaton High School, Wheaton

== Wabasha County ==
- Lincoln Secondary School, Lake City
- Plainview/Elgin/Millville, Plainview, Elgin
- River Valley Academy, Kellogg
- Wabasha-Kellogg Secondary School, Wabasha

== Wadena County ==
- Menahga Secondary School, Menahga
- Sebeka Secondary School, Sebeka
- Verndale Secondary School, Verndale
- Wadena-Deer Creek Senior High School, Wadena

== Waseca County ==
- Janesville-Waldorf-Pemberton High School, Janesville
- NRHEG High School, New Richland
- Waseca Senior High School, Waseca

== Washington County ==
- East Ridge High School, Woodbury
- Forest Lake Area High School, Forest Lake
- Hope Christian Academy, St. Paul Park
- Mahtomedi High School, Mahtomedi
- Math and Science Academy
- New Life Academy, Woodbury
- North Lakes Academy, Forest Lake
- Park High School, Cottage Grove
- St. Croix Preparatory Academy, Stillwater
- Southwest Junior High School, Forest Lake
- Stillwater Area High School, Stillwater
- Tartan Senior High School, Oakdale
- Woodbury Senior High School, Woodbury

== Watonwan County ==
- Butterfield-Odin Schools, Butterfield
- Madelia Secondary School, Madelia
- St. James High School, St. James

== Wilkin County ==
- Breckenridge Senior School, Breckenridge
- Campbell-Tintah Secondary School, Campbell
- Rothsay Secondary School, Rothsay

== Winona County ==
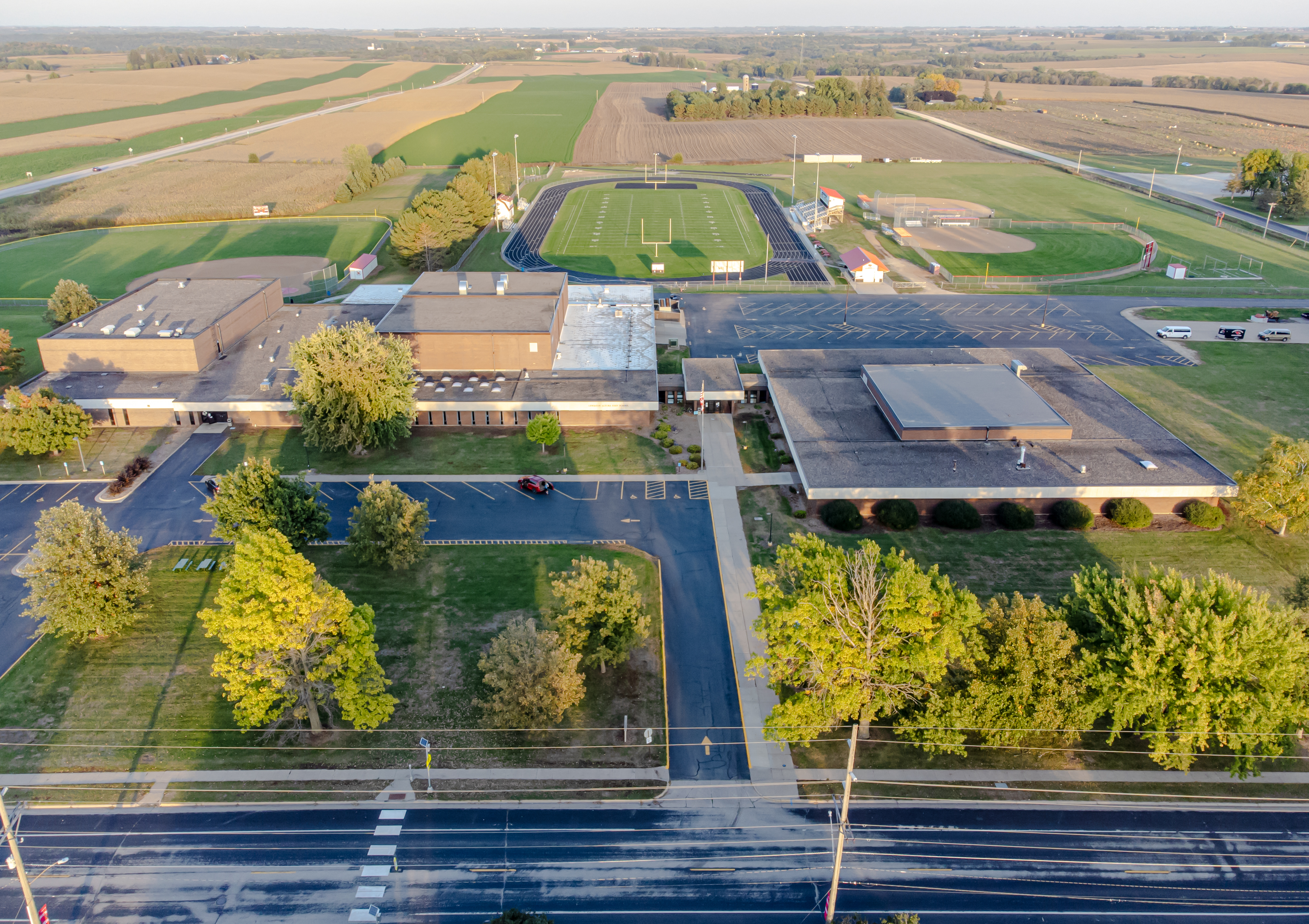
Lewiston-Altura High School in Lewiston, Minnesota

- Cotter High School, Winona
- Hope Lutheran High School, Winona
- Lewiston-Altura Secondary School, Lewiston
- Riverway Secondary School, Minnesota City
- St. Charles High School, St. Charles
- Winona Senior High School, Winona

== Wright County ==
- Annandale High School, Annandale
- Buffalo High School, Buffalo
- Dassel-Cokato Senior School, Cokato
- Delano High School, Delano
- Howard Lake-Waverly-Winsted Secondary School, Howard Lake
- Maple Lake Secondary School, Maple Lake
- Monticello High School, Monticello
- St. Michael-Albertville High School, Albertville

== Yellow Medicine County ==
- Canby High School, Canby
- ECHO Charter School, Echo
- Yellow Medicine East High School, Granite Falls

== Online schools ==
- Minnesota Online High School, statewide
- T4N Pinnacle Academy

== See also ==
- List of school districts in Minnesota
