= List of schools in Duluth, Minnesota =

This is a list of colleges, universities and K–12 schools in Duluth, Minnesota.

== Colleges and universities ==
- The College of St. Scholastica
- Duluth Business University
- Itasca Community College
- Lake Superior College
- University of Minnesota Duluth

== K–12 education ==
=== Public schools ===
Most public schools are administered by Duluth Public Schools. There are several independent public charter schools in the Duluth area not administered by District 709 with open enrollment.

==== Public elementary schools ====
- Congdon Park (K–5)
- Homecroft (K–5)
- Lakewood (K–5)
- Laura MacArthur (K–5)
- Lester Park (K–5)
- Lowell (K–5)
- Myers–Wilkins (K–5)
- Piedmont (K–5)
- Stowe (K–5)

==== Public middle schools ====
- Lincoln Park Middle School (6–8)
- Ordean East Middle School (6–8)

==== Public high schools ====
- Duluth Denfeld High School (9–12)
- Duluth East High School (9–12)

==== Charter schools ====
- Harbor City International School (9–12)
- North Shore Community School (PreK–6)
- North Star Academy, Edison Charter School (K–8)
- Raleigh Academy, Edison Charter School (K–5)

==== Alternative public schools ====
- Adult Learning Center
- Chester Creek Academy
- Merritt Creek Academy
- Secondary Technical Center
- Unity High School (located at the Historic Old Central High School)
- Woodland Hills Academy

=== Non-public schools ===
==== Independent schools ====
Independent schools are governed by an independent board of trustees and do not have any affiliation with, or oversight from, religious or government organizations. They are often accredited by a regional agency that is associated with the National Association of Independent Schools.

- Many Rivers Montessori (toddler to 8, independent, AMI-accredited)
- Marshall School (4–12, independent, ISACS-accredited)
- Montessori School of Duluth (preschool / elementary, independent, AMI-certified teachers)

==== Catholic schools ====
Catholic elementary schools in Duluth were unified in April 2017 as one school with three locations. They are under the administration of the Roman Catholic Diocese of Duluth.

- Stella Maris Academy
  - Holy Rosary Campus (PreK-4)
  - St. John the Evangelist Campus (5-8)
  - St. James Campus (preK-8)
- St. Michael's Lakeside Early Learning (toddlers, half-day preschool, full-day preschool, elementary after-school care)

==== Private schools (non-Catholic) ====
- Lakeview Christian Academy (preK–12)
- Stone Ridge Christian School
- Summit School
