= Sibley County ICTV System =

1980s interactive television education system

The Sibley County Interactive Cable TV (ICTV) System was a groundbreaking form of distance education using interactive television that drew national media attention.

== Overview ==
Launched in 1985, the ICTV system connected classrooms in four Sibley County, Minnesota, schools together by using four unused channels on Triax Cablevision's cable TV lines that already served the communities (installed a few years prior). The system was designed to address the problem of falling enrollments that the four schools were facing (and thus falling funding for teachers), by allowing the schools to share teachers.

- The schools on the system were Gibbon, Winthrop, Arlington, and Gaylord.
- The total cost of the system was $150,000.

The system allowed a teacher to teach a class to students at any or all of the schools. The teacher could physically be located at any of the schools. The teacher and students at all of the schools could see and to talk to each other, although assignments and tests had to be sent by courier (later fax) between the schools. Additionally, in the evenings professors from nearby Mankato State University traveled to a school of their choice and taught introductory classes on the system, allowing high school students at the schools to receive post-secondary education (i.e., college) credits at no cost and without having to travel to the university.

In 1989, the National School Boards Association launched school-site visits to several areas, including Sibley County, to show off distance learning systems.

== Operation ==
At each school, the system consisted of a classroom wired with the following equipment:

- 8 Televisions.
  - 4 facing the teacher, showing each of the four classrooms.
  - 4 facing the students, showing each of the four classrooms.
- 3 Cameras. Only one could be active at a time, select-able via push-buttons on the teacher's podium.
  - 1 facing the teacher.
  - 1 facing down at the teacher's podium (mounted on the ceiling).
  - 1 facing the students.
- 2 Microphones.
  - 1 to pick up the teacher's sounds (clip-on).
  - 1 to pick up the student's sounds (mounted on the ceiling).
- 1 Computer running a slide show program (optional).
- 1 Push-button switchbox (as previously mentioned).
- 1 Cable TV Modulator.

At the teacher's school, the teacher typically alternated between selecting the podium's camera and the teacher's camera. At the remote students' schools, the students' camera was typically always selected.

To transport the TV signals generated by each school to all of the other schools, they were broadcast over the local cable television system that already connected the four communities, on four unused channels:

- Channel 32: Gibbon
- Channel 33: Gaylord
- Channel 34: Winthrop
- Channel 35: Arlington

Because the cable TV system was used, people at home in the communities could also watch classes being taught, although they could not interact with them. Taking advantage of this "feature", each school also connected a computer running a slide-show program to the system that broadcast school-related news and information (announcements, calendars, lunch menus, etc.) to their respective communities when classes weren't being taught. The computer was select-able from the push-button switchbox.

== Shutdown ==
The system was shut down around 1990. By this time, Gibbon, Fairfax, and Winthrop had consolidated to form GFW Schools, and Arlington and Gaylord had consolidated to form Sibley East Schools.

The larger class sizes as a result of these consolidations meant the system was no longer necessary.
