= Granite High School =

Granite High School may refer to:

- Granite High School (Montana), Philipsburg, Montana
- Granite High School (Oklahoma), Granite, Oklahoma
- Granite High School (Utah), South Salt Lake, Utah
- Granite Bay High School, Granite Bay, California
- Granite City High School, Granite City, Illinois
- Yellow Medicine East High School, Granite Falls, Minnesota
- Granite Falls High School, Granite Falls, Washington
- Granite Hills High School (Porterville, California), Porterville, California
- Granite Hills High School (Apple Valley, California), Apple Valley, California
- Granite Hills High School (El Cajon, California), El Cajon, California
- Raymond Granite High School, Raymond, California
