= Tomahawk Conference =

- Classification: MSHSL 1A-2A
- Sports fielded: 7
- No. of teams: 10
- Region: Minnesota

The Tomahawk Conference is a Minnesota State High School League sanctioned athletic conference comprising schools located in the south central region of Minnesota.

== Offerings ==
=== Sports ===
The conference offers the following:

| Fall | Winter | Spring |
|---|---|---|
| Volleyball | Basketball (b/g) | Baseball |
| Cross Country (b/g) | Wrestling | Softball |
| Tennis | Gymnastics | Track (b/g) |
| | Dance Team | Golf (b/g) |

The conference schools football teams play in either the Southern Minnesota Conference or Gopher Conference. Teams in the Tomahawk Conference compete in competitive classes of A and AA for section and state tournaments.

=== Activities ===
The conference offers the following:

| Fall | Winter | Spring |
|---|---|---|
| | Speech | Speech |
| | Knowledge Bowl | |
| | Math Team | |
| | One Act Play | |

== Current members ==
The conference consists of 9 competing sports teams. Enrollments are reflective of 2023-2024 and 2024-2025 totals used for classification by the Minnesota State High School League.

| Institution | Location (Population) | Founded | Affiliation | Enrollment | Nickname |
|---|---|---|---|---|---|
| Buffalo Lake-Hector-Stewart High School | Hector, Minnesota (1,012) | 1987 | Public | 127 | Mustangs |
| Cedar Mountain High School | Morgan, Minnesota (888) | 1983 | Public | 128 | Cougars |
| Gibbon-Fairfax-Winthrop High School | Winthrop, Minnesota (1,332) | 1987 | Public | 177 | Thunderbirds |
| Lester Prairie High School | Lester Prairie, Minnesota (1,894) | 1901 | Public | 139 | Bulldogs |
| New Ulm Cathedral High School | New Ulm, Minnesota (14,120) | 1919 | Private | 111 | Greyhounds |
| Sleepy Eye High School | Sleepy Eye, Minnesota (3,452) | 1890 | Public | 137 | Indians |
| Sleepy Eye St. Mary's High School | Sleepy Eye, Minnesota (3,452) | 1884 | Private | 76 | Knights |
| Springfield High School | Springfield, Minnesota (2,027) | 1889 | Public | 148 | Tigers |
| Wabasso High School | Wabasso, Minnesota (739) | 1893 | Public | 130 | Rabbits |

== Former members ==
- McLeod West High School - closed spring 2009.
- Minnesota Valley Lutheran - joined the South Central Conference for the 2024-2025 academic year.
