= Arcadia Charter School =

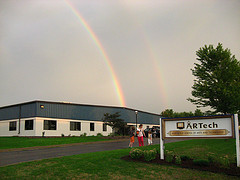
- Arcadia Charter School

Location
- Northfield, Minnesota; United States; 44°26′22.5″N 93°11′6″W

Information
- Type: Public Charter
- Established: 2001
- Director: Laura Stelter
- Teaching staff: 9.72 (FTE)
- Grades: 6–12
- Enrollment: 116 (2024–2025)
- Student to teacher ratio: 11.93
- Website: https://www.arcadiacharterschool.org/

Arcadia Charter School (formally referred to as ARTech Charter School) is a project-based 6–12th grade charter school located in Northfield, Minnesota, United States. The school has previously been known as South-Eastern Minnesota School of Arts and Technology prior to 2003, and Northfield School of Arts and Technology from 2003 to 2012.

== History ==
A community group that included Jim Blaha, Winona Estes, Maryrose Gondeck, Keith Johnson, Leisa Irwin, Paula Manor, Anne Mikkelson and Griff Wigley founded Northfield School of Arts and Technology in 2001, with the purpose of creating a project-based learning environment similar to New Country School in Henderson.

In July 2012 ARTech Charter School changed its name to Arcadia Charter School to emphasize its focus on all project learning not just project learning in the arts and sciences.

During 2010-2011 the school expanded off its south side adding a science room (the Goodall Room) and an art room (the Tesla Room). A student-lead project installed solar panels on the building helping to reduce Arcadia's energy bill. In 2018 a student lead Eagle Scout Service Project built a picnic shelter in Arcadia's backyard which is now used for lunch and as a studying area. In 2019 the school completed a large renovation expanding off the south side of the building and renovating the old building to create three new classrooms.

== Curriculum ==
Today, Arcadia has 4 advisories. The high school advisories, Blue Advisory and Red Advisory, and the middle school advisories, Purple Advisory and Green Advisory. These act as a "homeroom" for students. High school students receive a desk in their advisory that they may decorate and use as their personal space to work on homework and projects.

Middle school students receive a locker that they may decorate. They share tables with their fellow middle school students to work on projects and homework.

Middle School students are required to take "CORE" classes that include

• Art

• Social studies

• Math

• Language

• Science.

High school students are required to have 23 credits in order to graduate. Students must do at least 1 credit of projects to graduate as well. Required credits include

• 2 credits of literature

• 2 credits of writing

• 3 credits of Math

• 1 credit of US History

• .75 credit of World History

• .5 credit of Economics

• .5 credit of Government

• .5 credit of Civics

• .25 credit of Geography

• 2 credits of Art

• .25 credit of Arts Analysis

• 7.25 credits of Elective

Students can get these credits through required classes, elective classes (non-required classes) or independent projects.

Some required high school classes at Arcadia include

• Geometry

• Algebra 2

• Basic Composition

• Intro to Literature

• U.S. History

• World History

• Intro to Art

In 11th Grade, students must complete a Junior Project, where they will learn how to look for a residence, how to create a budget, and how credit and a credit score works. This is Arcadia's solution to the lack of necessary life skills taught in school.

In 12th grade, students are required to complete a large project. This is called the Senior Project. It may be on any subject. This project is completed by the Senior Appreciation Day.

Arcadia has a 6-day schedule, with 6 periods every day. Breakfast and Lunch is offered.

== Governance ==
=== School board ===
The school is an independent school district, governed by a board of 9.

The first school board meeting occurred on October 25, 2001.

=== Directorship ===
Arcadia Charter School is currently directed (a "director" is similar to a traditional principal) by Laura Stelter.

- Leisa Irwin (2003 – 2004)
- Timothy Goodwin (2004 – 2008)
- Simon Tyler (2008 – 2011)
- Ryan Krominga (2011 – 2015)
- Patrick Exner (2015 – 2016)
- Barb Wornson (2016 - 2019)
- Laura Stelter (2019–present)

== Renewable energy ==
Artech is on a team called Minnesota Schools Cutting Carbon, which is a team of 100 different schools in Minnesota reducing as much energy as possible in 3 years.

=== Solar panels ===
During the summer of 2008, Artech installed a 2.8 Kilowatt solar panel system, and has since seen a decrease in electrical bills.

=== Greenhouse ===
The greenhouse has been operating for 10 years and began as student led project. It is run through a 3 quarter long seminar that includes growing seedlings, writing a newsletter, and operating the greenhouse. During the expansion of the school in 2019, the Arcadia greenhouse was temporarily removed. In 2023, the greenhouse was relocated to the north side of the property.

=== Sustainable energy ("green") team ===
Indeed, Artech also has a team focused solely on reducing the school's impact on the environment, lowering energy bills, and reducing the trash coming from the school. Some ideas they have for accomplishing these tasks are installing a Wind turbine, taking out light fixtures, and collecting runoff water.

== Student population ==
Arcadia Charter School currently holds roughly 120 students and 93.3% of whom are white. 22% of students are on a special education program.
