= Catholic High School =

Catholic High School may refer to:

== Asia ==
- Catholic High School, Singapore
- Catholic High School, Melaka, Malaysia
- Catholic High School, Petaling Jaya, Selangor, Malaysia

== Australia ==
- Catholic High School, Griffith, New South Wales

== United States ==
- Pope John Paul II Catholic High School (Huntsville, Alabama)
- Catholic High School for Boys (Little Rock, Arkansas)
- Catholic High School (Baton Rouge, Louisiana)
- Catholic High School (New Iberia, Louisiana)
- Catholic High School (New Ulm, Minnesota)
- Catholic High School (Virginia), Virginia Beach, Virginia; formerly Bishop Sullivan Catholic High School
- Allentown Central Catholic High School, Allentown, Pennsylvania
- Roman Catholic High School, Philadelphia, Pennsylvania

== See also ==
- Catholic school
