= Willie Townes =

American football player (1943–2017)

No. 71
- Positions: Defensive end, Defensive tackle

Personal information
- Born: July 21, 1943; Hattiesburg, Mississippi, U.S.
- Died: July 22, 2017 (aged 74); Dallas, Texas, U.S.
- Listed height: 6 ft 4 in (1.93 m)
- Listed weight: 260 lb (118 kg)

Career information
- High school: Rowan (MS)
- College: Indiana (1962); Tulsa (1964-1965)
- NFL draft: 1966: 2nd round, 22nd overall pick
- AFL draft: 1966: Red Shirt 1st round, 2nd overall pick

Career history
- Dallas Cowboys (1966–1969); New Orleans Saints (1970); New York Giants (1971)*
- * Offseason or practice squad member only

Awards and highlights
- 2× All-MVC (1964, 1965); MVC sophomore of the year (1964)

Career NFL statistics
- Fumble recoveries: 5
- Safety: 1
- Touchdowns: 1
- Stats at Pro Football Reference

Willie Carroll Townes (July 21, 1943 – July 22, 2017) was an American professional football defensive end in the National Football League (NFL). He played college football for the Tulsa Golden Hurricane and was selected in the second round of the 1966 NFL draft by the Dallas Cowboys. He later played for the New Orleans Saints.

== Early life ==
Townes was born on July 21, 1943, in Hattiesburg, Mississippi, and played high school football at Rowan High School. In football he played end, tackle and fullback, at 6 feet 3 inches tall and weighing 220 pounds. He also ran track and practiced basketball (averaged 14 points per game).

He accepted a football scholarship from Indiana University, but ended up transferring after his freshman year to Coffeyville Junior College. In 1964, he transferred to the University of Tulsa, where he along with Charlie Brown, Randy Phillips, Richard Tyson and Jim Brown, were the first athletes to break the school's color barrier.

Townes would become one of the best defensive linemen in school's history. He was a two-time All-Missouri Valley Conference selection at defensive tackle in 1964 and 1965. The 1964 team beat Mississippi 14–7 in the Bluebonnet Bowl, where he received the game's outstanding lineman trophy. He also was an honorable-mention All-American selection. In 1965, he was an All-American candidate, but ankle and knee injuries limited him that year.

He passed up his senior year in 1966 to sign with an NFL team, when he became eligible because he was a redshirt player whose class had graduated.

In 1986, he was inducted into the University of Tulsa Athletic Hall of Fame.

== Professional career ==
=== Dallas Cowboys ===
Townes was selected by the Dallas Cowboys in the second round (22nd overall) of the 1966 NFL draft and also in the first round of the 1966 AFL Redshirt Draft by the Boston Patriots of the American Football League. He was selected with a future draft pick, which allowed the team to draft him before his college eligibility was over, but Townes instead elected to leave college and sign with the team.

He started his professional career as a defensive tackle, but in the middle of his rookie season, he was moved to left defensive end, replacing Larry Stephens in the starting lineup after the seventh game. At the end of the year, he was considered one of the top rookies in the league and a rising star.

He is perhaps best known for causing Bart Starr to fumble in the 1967 NFL Championship Game, commonly known as the Ice Bowl. The fumble was picked up and returned for a touchdown by defensive end George Andrie, scoring six of the Cowboys' seventeen points in the loss.

Townes played in only five games during the 1968 season, after suffering a serious hamstring injury and was replaced in the starting lineup by rookie Larry Cole, who would not relinquish the position back. Cole moved to tackle in 1975 following the retirement of Bob Lilly, allowing Ed "Too Tall" Jones, the number one overall pick in the 1974 NFL draft, to start at left end.

He missed the entire 1969 season due to the same injury. Citing health and weight problems as a major reason for their decision, the Cowboys traded him to the New Orleans Saints in exchange for a fourth round draft choice (#80-Joe Carter) on September 9, 1970.

The NFL didn't start recognizing quarterback sacks as an official stat until 1982; however the Cowboys have their own records, dating back before the 1982 season. According to the Cowboys' stats, Townes is unofficially credited with a total of nine sacks during his 1966 season, tying him with Harvey Martin for the most by a Cowboys rookie in franchise history. With fifteen sacks, he is also tied with Larry Cole for the third most sacks (behind DeMarcus Ware and Harvey Martin) recorded by a Cowboys player in his first two years in the NFL.

=== New Orleans Saints ===
Townes was released on January 25, 1971, after appearing in just six games with the New Orleans Saints. Townes fell out of favor when coach Tom Fears was fired midway through the 1970 season and replaced by J.D. Roberts, who disdained the aging, mostly over-the-hill players stockpiled by Fears.

=== New York Giants ===
He finished his NFL career after he was released by the New York Giants on August 24, 1971. During his short career he played in 38 games, recorded one safety and one touchdown.

== Personal life ==
In 1982, he filed a malpractice lawsuit against the Dallas Cowboys. After football he had 2 knee replacements and a shoulder replacement. He died from a heart attack on July 22, 2017, in Dallas, one day after his 74th birthday. It was later discovered that he also had pancreatic cancer.
