= Larry Cole =

American football player (born 1946)

No. 63
- Positions: Defensive end, Defensive tackle

Personal information
- Born: November 15, 1946 (age 79); Clarkfield, Minnesota, U.S.
- Listed height: 6 ft 5 in (1.96 m)
- Listed weight: 252 lb (114 kg)

Career information
- High school: Granite Falls (Granite Falls, Minnesota)
- College: Hawaii
- NFL draft: 1968: 16th round, 428th overall pick

Career history
- Dallas Cowboys (1968–1980)

Awards and highlights
- 2× Super Bowl champion (VI, XII)

Career NFL statistics
- Fumble recoveries: 14
- Interceptions: 4
- Touchdowns: 4
- Sacks: 59
- Stats at Pro Football Reference

Lawrence Rudolph Cole (born November 15, 1946) is an American former professional football player who was a defensive lineman in the National Football League (NFL) for the Dallas Cowboys. He played in five Super Bowls, winning Super Bowl VI and XII. He played college football for the Air Force Falcons and Hawaii Warriors.

== Early life ==
Cole attended Granite Falls High School in Minnesota, where he was a starter at defensive tackle. Granite Falls eventually merged with other schools, creating a new one called Yellow Medicine East High School.

He accepted a football scholarship from the United States Air Force Academy. He was named a starter at defensive end as a sophomore. In 1965, the Air Force Academy was rocked by a cheating scandal in which over 100 cadets resigned or were expelled, including many of its top athletes. Though not personally implicated himself, Cole decided to resign from the school as well.

He tried the University of Houston but was unhappy about not being in the starting lineup. He followed seven other former teammates from the academy and transferred to the University of Hawaiʻi to play his senior season in 1967. He was named a starter at defensive tackle, one of the team's co-captains and helped the school achieve its first winning season in nearly half a century.

== Professional career ==
Cole was selected in the sixteenth round (428th overall) of the 1968 NFL/AFL draft by the Dallas Cowboys, becoming the first player from Hawaii to be drafted by a National Football League team. He was chosen as an offensive tackle, but was switched to the defensive line one week into training camp.

Dave Edwards nicknamed him "Bubber Frank", which later evolved into "Bubba". Cole made an immediate impact as a rookie, appearing in all 14 games, with 10 starts at left defensive end (replacing an injured Willie Townes) and scoring 2 defensive touchdowns.

In 1972, he suffered a knee injury in the fourth game against the Pittsburgh Steelers and didn't return to the starting lineup until the twelfth contest. In 1975, because of Bob Lilly's retirement, he was moved from defensive end to right defensive tackle. In 1976, he had 57 tackles, 5 unofficial sacks and one fumble recovery. He shared the starting job with Bill Gregory for 2 seasons (1975 and 1976).

In 1977, he became a backup player after Randy White took over the right defensive tackle position. He was relegated to a reserve role in the Cowboys' 27-10 Super Bowl XII victory over the Denver Broncos.

In 1978, he started 3 games in place of the injured Harvey Martin and Jethro Pugh. He made 3 key plays in the NFC championship game against the Los Angeles Rams, forcing a fumble from running back John Cappelletti, stopped Pat Haden's quarterback draw short of a first down, which contributed to a missed field goal and pressured Haden into an interception. Cole also started in Super Bowl XIII in place of injured Pugh, tying a record with 5 Super Bowl appearances.

In 1979, he was set to replace retired Pugh at left defensive tackle, but opened the season at left defensive end in place of Ed "Too Tall" Jones, who unexpectedly retired to pursue boxing. When John Dutton became the regular left defensive end for the last four games. Cole switched back to left defensive tackle. During his career, he made some of the biggest defensive plays in the history of the Cowboys franchise. Probably his most famous play, was the tackle of hall of famer-to-be John Riggins for a two-yard loss on third-and-two late in the game, that set up one of the most dramatic wins in Cowboys history on December 16. As it turned out, it was the last of Roger Staubach's comebacks. In that game he also had 10 tackles and 2 unofficial sacks.

In 1980, he started 16 games at left defensive tackle ahead of Dutton. On March 26, 1981, he announced his retirement, becoming along with D.D. Lewis, the first three-decade Cowboys in franchise history. He is one of only eight NFL players that appeared in five Super Bowls: (V, VI, X, XII and XIII). Cole helped the Cowboys win 2 Super Bowls and 5 NFC Championships. He played in 26 total playoff games, a record when he retired.

As an athlete, he was said to be very smart and versatile, playing different positions along the defensive line during his career. He was a member of the "Zero Club" which prided itself on performing behind the scenes. Their first rule, "Thou Shalt Not Seek Publicity", kept their members (Cole, Blaine Nye and Pat Toomay) out of the limelight.

Cole was overshadowed as a defensive lineman by not one, but two generations of great players: first Lilly, Pugh and George Andrie; then White, Martin and Jones. Cole started at left end for the Cowboys in their first two Super Bowls, Super Bowl V (a loss to the Baltimore Colts) and Super Bowl VI (a 24–3 victory over the Miami Dolphins). In Super Bowl X vs. the Pittsburgh Steelers, Cole moved to right tackle to replace the retired Lilly and allow youngsters Martin and Jones to start at end.

The NFL didn't start recognizing quarterback sacks as an official stat until 1982, however, the Cowboys have their own records, dating back before the 1982 season. Although he was known as a run specialist, he had the athletic ability to be unofficially credited with a career total of 60 sacks. With 15 sacks, he is also tied with Willie Townes for the third most sacks (behind DeMarcus Ware and Harvey Martin) recorded by a Cowboys player in his first two years in the NFL.

Cole scored 4 touchdowns during his career (3 interception returns and 1 fumble return), all coming against the rival Washington Redskins. His 3 interceptions returns for touchdowns, is tied for second in Cowboys history. During his last season, he returned an interception for a touchdown against the Redskins on November 23, 1980. When he retired after playing 13 seasons, asked about the 11-year hiatus between his third and fourth NFL touchdowns, he replied: "Anyone can have an off decade".

== Personal life ==
After his football career he became a real estate developer. In 2012, he joined other retired players to file a concussion-related lawsuit against the NFL.
