= Nova Classical Academy =

Charter school in St. Paul, Minnesota, U.S.

Coordinates: 44.9178°N 93.1375°W

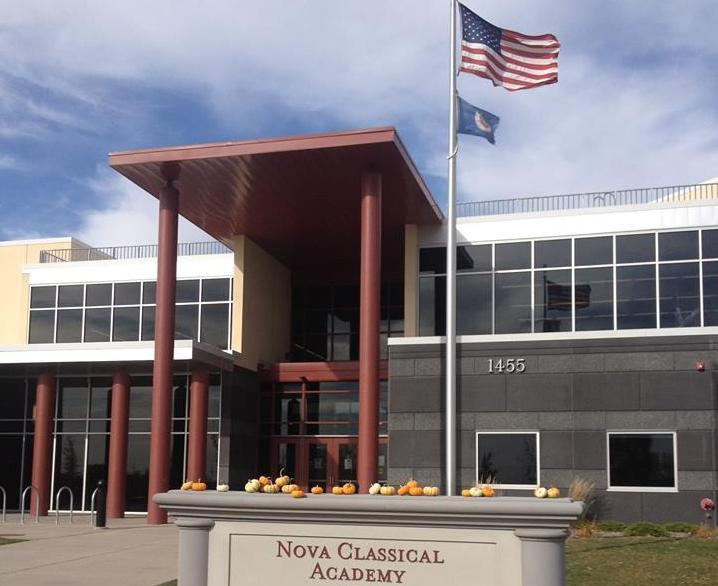
Nova Classical Academy is a charter school in St. Paul, Minnesota.

Nova Classical Academy is a K–12 charter school in St. Paul, Minnesota, that follows the classical model for education. Its executive director is Dr. Brett Wedlund, and it has a student enrollment of 990.

== History ==
Nova opened its doors in 2003 as a K–6 school. Over the years, it has grown from K–6 to K–8 to a K–12 school, graduating its first class of seniors in 2013. When it first opened, the school was based in St. Paul's Highland Park neighborhood, with K-6 students housed in a church building. When the 7th and 8th grades were added, grades 6–8 were moved to an adjoining modular building. In 2010 the school began renting space from a different church for students in grades 6–8, called the Upper Campus. The rented building was at 426 Osceola Ave S. In 2012 all grades moved to a permanent location in Victoria Park, near the Mississippi River.

== Classical trivium ==
Nova follows the classical trivium of grammar, logic, and rhetoric. The school is subdivided into two sections: the Lower School, also called the School of Grammar, which contains grades K–5, and the Upper School, containing grades 6–12. The Upper School is further subdivided into the School of Logic, grades 6–8, and the School of Rhetoric, grades 9–12.

== Lower & Upper School ==
Nova's Lower School has a student population of 470, with 80 students in kindergarten and 78 students in 1st–5th grade. Lower school students wear white or maroon shirts and maroon plaid jumpers or navy pants. The Upper School has a student population of 528, with 372 students in the high school. Middle school students wear maroon plaid skirts instead of jumpers, and high school students wear black pants or skirts.

Nova has received several academic awards. It was a 2016–17 Minnesota Department of Education Reward School and in 2017 was ranked as the #1 high school in Minnesota by U.S. News & World Report.

== Extracurriculars ==
Nova's extracurricular programs include varsity sports, forensics (including mock trial, debate and model UN), robotics, art, theater, yoga, yearbook, newspaper, student senate, fencing, choir, chess, movie club, game coding, GSA and philosophy club. The drama department has participated in the MSHSL One Act Competition several times, and starred at state in 2014, 2019, and 2020.

== Mock trial ==
Nova's mock trial teams have competed in the international Empire Invitational four times in New York City, and once at the international Empire Invitational in San Francisco, California. The teams received awards at three of these tournaments, placing 8th in New York 2013 and 2014 and 3rd in 2017 at the California competition. They received an honorable mention by placing 16th in 2016 at the New York competition, and placed 17th in 2019.

Nova has advanced to the Minnesota High School Mock Trial State Tournament every year from 2012 to 2026, winning the MSBA State Championship and advancing to the National High School Mock Trial Championship (NHSMTC) in 2013, 2015, 2016, 2018, 2020, 2023, and 2026. In 2018, Nova finished second out of 46 teams, the highest ranking in school history. Nova also placed 3rd in 2016, 4th in 2015 and 11th in 2013 at the National High School Mock Trial Championship. It was the State Runner-Up Team in 2012, and placed in the top 8 teams in 2014, 2017, 2021, 2022, 2024, and 2025.

== Varsity sports ==
Nova's varsity sports include boys and girls soccer, boys and girls cross-country running, volleyball, boys and girls basketball, boys and girls ice hockey, baseball, girls lacrosse, boys and girls track and boys tennis. Between 2012 and 2019 Nova won 28 conference championships in six sports (baseball, volleyball, basketball, cross-country, track, and soccer).

Nova is a member of the Skyline Conference, the largest athletic conference in Minnesota. Many Nova students have been sent to the state meets in cross-country and track and field since 2015. Eleven Nova graduates play Division 3 NCAA sports throughout the country in baseball, soccer, lacrosse, track, and cross-country.

== Lawsuits ==
In 2013, Nicholas Zinos sued Nova for violating his sixth-grade daughter's right to freedom of speech after she was stopped from distributing anti-abortion materials at school. The flyers included phrases such as "save the baby humans STOP abortion," and were distributed during lunch. The lawsuit was successful, and Nova was required to pay $8,000 in legal fees and allow Zinos's daughter to continue distributing the materials.

On March 24, 2016, David and Hannah Edwards filed a charge of discrimination with the City of St. Paul Department of Human Rights alleging that Nova failed to provide an environment for their daughter to "undergo a gender transition... in a safe and timely way." The Edwardses served the school with a two-count, civil discrimination lawsuit that demanded policy and training changes. The school denied the allegations. On August 8, 2017, the parties announced that they had settled the case through mediation. The settlement included ongoing staff training and updates to Nova's Gender Inclusion Policy, as well as a $120,000 financial settlement. Ultimately, the school adopted a gender inclusion policy that the Edwardses said they were pleased with.
