= GFW Schools =

School district in Minnesota, United States

Location
- Gibbon, Minnesota (district office) Sibley County, 55335; United States
- Coordinates: 44°32′4″N 94°31′19″W

District information
- Type: Public
- Motto: Fostering Lifelong Learners in a Caring Environment
- Grades: PK – 12
- Established: 1987
- Superintendent: Jeff Horton
- Schools: Elementary (1), High (1)
- NCES District ID: 2712580

Students and staff
- Students: 788
- Teachers: 58.56
- Staff: 49.23
- Student–teacher ratio: 13.46
- Athletic conference: Tomahawk (most sports), Gopher Valley AA (football)
- District mascot: Thunderbirds
- Colors: Red, black, and gold

Other information
- District Song: Notre Dame Victory March
- MDE ID: 2365
- MSHSL ID: 520
- Website: http://www.gfw.k12.mn.us

GFW Schools is an independent public school district in south central Minnesota. Originally formed to serve the communities of Gibbon, Fairfax and Winthrop, the district has expanded over time to encompasses large portions of other surrounding communities, including:

- Lafayette: GFW sponsors the Lafayette Charter School.
- Brownton and Stewart: GFW absorbed much of the former McLeod County West school district.

== Schools ==
The district consists of two schools (before 2020, one was in each of the original three communities):

- GFW Elementary School (also the district office) - K-5
- GFW High School - 6–12

The middle school in Fairfax, Minnesota was closed following the 2019-2020 school year where the 6-8th grades were brought to Winthrop.

== School Board ==
The district's school board consists of six members (two from each of the three communities). The term of office is four years.

== Technology Initiatives ==
=== Interactive Cable TV (ICTV) System ===
Launched in 1985, the Sibley County Interactive Cable TV System was a groundbreaking form of distance education using interactive television that drew national media attention.

=== iPad Initiative ===
Launched in 2010, the iPad Initiative made GFW one of the first schools in the nation to provide all of its high school students with iPads. Because of this, it became known as a pioneer in making the switch from physical textbooks to electronic textbooks, and consequently gained local and national press coverage.

For its trailblazing efforts, GFW was awarded the Apple Distinguished School award by Apple for the 2010-2011 school year.
