= Eagle Ridge Academy =

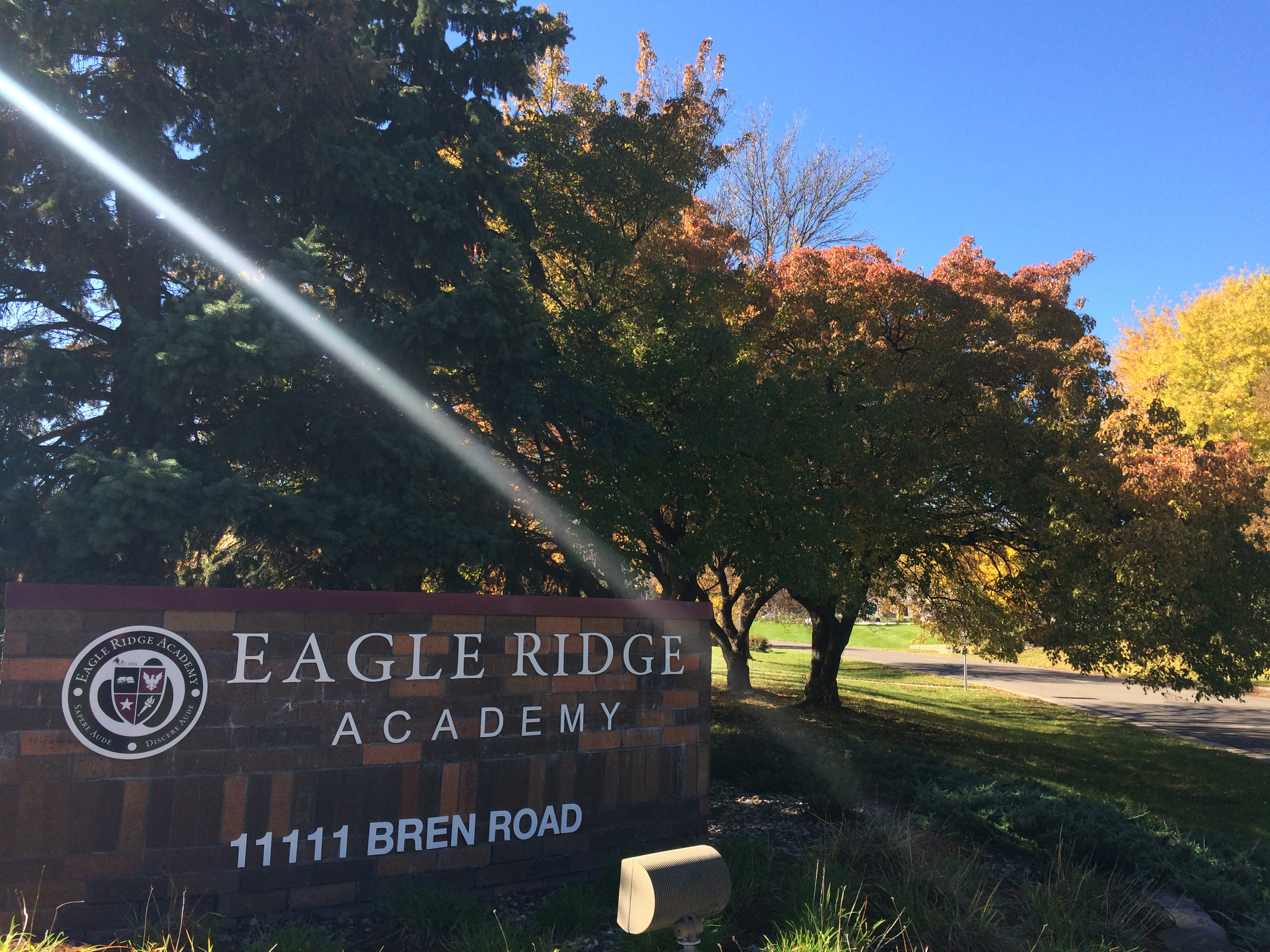

Location
- 11111 Bren Road W. Minnetonka, Minnesota 55343; United States
- 44.9005°N 93.4188°W

Information
- Type: Charter school
- Authority: Friends of Education
- Faculty: 100
- Grades: K to 12
- Enrollment: 714 (2023-2024)
- Colors: Burgundy and Gray
- Mascot: Gryphons
- Website: www.eagleridgeacademy.org

Eagle Ridge Academy is a charter school with a philosophical emphasis on the classical education movement that serves grades Kindergarten through twelve. It is located in the southern part of Minnetonka, MN (close to Eden Prairie, Minnesota) having moved from another location in 2016. The Kindergarten through eighth grade curriculum follows the Core Knowledge Sequence published by the Core Knowledge Foundation and the high school follows a "Classical framework" to structure its humane letters program.

== History ==
Eagle Ridge opened in 2004 with 107 students in grades 6, 7, and 9. Today, Eagle Ridge Academy serves 1,240 students from 29 school districts in kindergarten through grade 12. The Eagle Ridge Academy Schools of Grammar and Logic have rigorous curricula to ensure high achievement: Core Knowledge Sequence, Saxon Math, Shurley English, Pearson History and Geography, Saxon Phonics, and leveled guided reading. The School of Rhetoric offers a wide variety of classes in Music, Arts, World Languages, Advanced Placement, College in the Schools, and the Humanities.

The Academy has had five school directors, Dr. Ken Greener (2004), Mrs. Judi Ingison (2004-2008), Mr. John Howitz (2008-2011), Ms. Mari Bergerson (2011), and Mr. Jason Ulbrich (2011–present).

On January 12, 2005 the Minnesota Department of Education issued its annual report to the Minnesota Legislature that found Eagle Ridge Academy to be in statutory operating debt. The Academy received the School Finance Award from the Minnesota Department of Education for fiscal years 2007, 2008, 2009, 2010 and 2011.

Eagle Ridge Academy had its first high school graduation in June 2008. On July 22, 2008, the Minnesota Department of Education released the results of a transportation audit of the 2006-2007 fiscal year.

MCA-II test scores declined in 2008-2009 and again in 2009-2010. The Academy received the Achievement Award for performance during the 2007-2008 school year from its sponsor, Friends of Education, on August 6, 2009.

U.S. News & World Report ranked Eagle Ridge Academy as a "bronze medal" high school based on academic performance in 2007-2008 in the magazine's 2010 "America's Best High Schools" issue.

In July 2016, the school moved to a new building that they completely renovated to house grades K-12. The new building includes a gymnasium, a solarium in the cafeteria, and a human chess board embedded in the floor tiles of the forum. Updates will continue through 2017 to build the second story and auditorium.

The graduating class of 2016 had 47 students. U.S News has given Eagle Ridge Academy a college readiness score of 56.15/100 by US News.

A fire which erupted in the school set off sprinklers on Friday October 27, 2017. This fire shut down school for the day, and caused cosmetic damage throughout the building. The fire originated from the kiln room.

Past graduates have attended colleges including Hope College, Iowa State University, Princeton University, United States Air Force, United States Marine Corps, United States Navy, Yale University, and others.

== Controversy ==
A number of controversies (under previous Executive Directors) occurred at Eagle Ridge in the late 2000s.

On October 11, 2007, Eagle Ridge Academy was evacuated due to a mercury spill. At least four people were exposed to the toxic chemicals, but no injuries were reported.

On February 5, 2008, former teacher, Josh Garvin, filed a lawsuit with the United States District Court, District of Minnesota, Fourth Division, against Eagle Ridge Academy. The suit claimed school officials violated federal law by opening Garvin's private e-mail account and reading messages he had written to the chemistry teacher in which they discussed ways to report potential improprieties to the school's board of directors. On January 6, 2009, former teacher, Susan Reid, also filed a lawsuit in the same court against Eagle Ridge Academy.

In November 2008, KSTP-TV, 5 Eyewitness News, aired a report regarding unlicensed teachers in state charter schools. Eagle Ridge Academy was not named in the television report but was cited in KSTP's 2008 online reporting.

== Extracurriculars ==
Eagle Ridge Academy offers middle school and Minnesota State High School League sports – baseball, basketball, cross country, golf, soccer, tennis, track & field, ultimate Frisbee, and volleyball. Eagle Ridge Academy also offers other extra-curricular activities (i.e., chess, mock trial, drama).

The Academy has a student senate, mock trial team, The Citizen school paper, robotics, and chapters of the National Junior Classical League and National Honor Society.

=== Mock trial ===
The Academy founded its mock trial program in the 2018-19 school year, under the guidance of an alumna and a Humanities teacher.

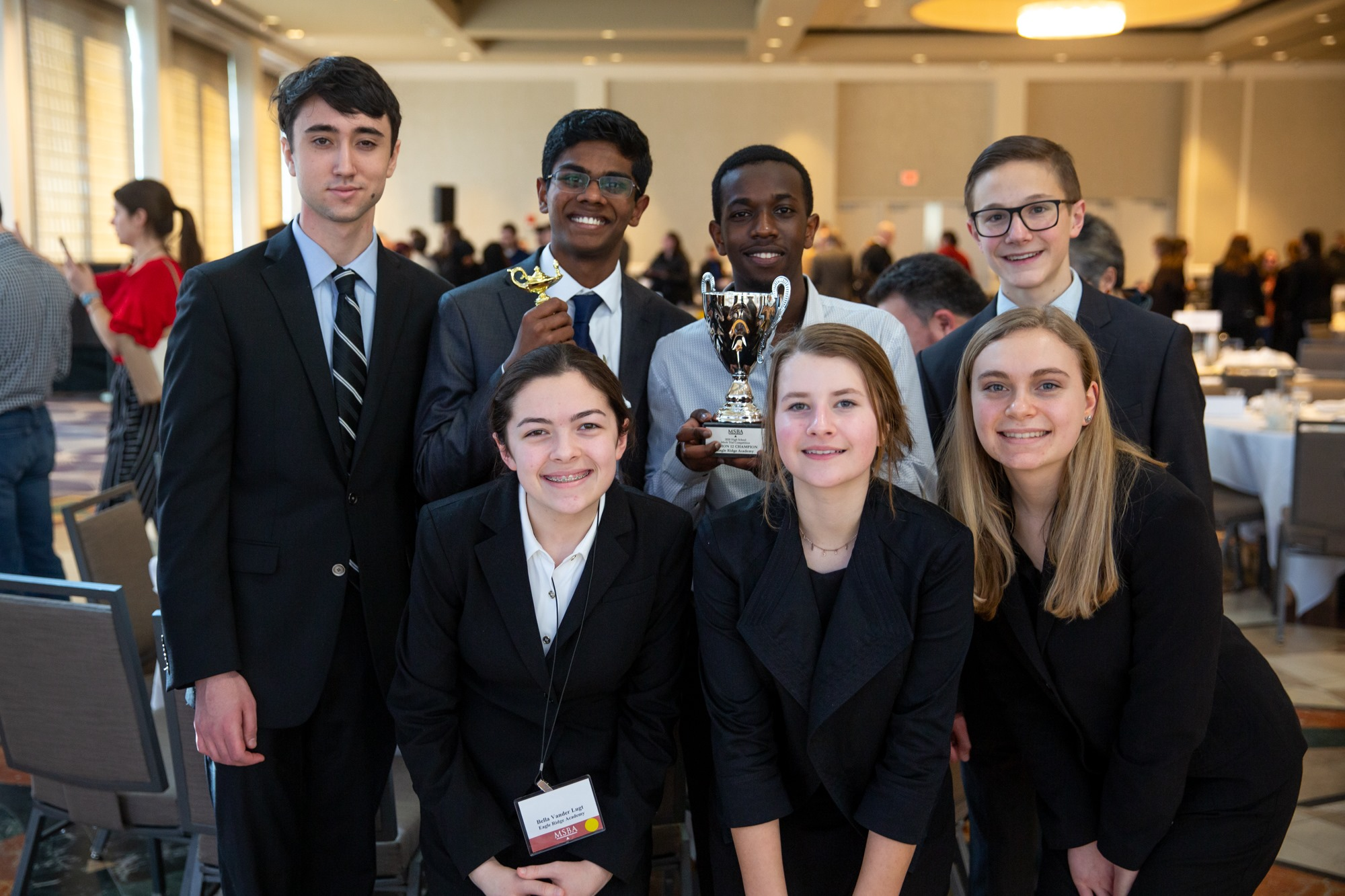
Eagle Ridge Academy's mock trial team took third place at the Minnesota High School Mock Trial State Tournament in 2020.

In only its second year (2020) with a mock trial program, Eagle Ridge advanced to the Minnesota High School Mock Trial State Tournament and took third place. In the program’s third year, 2021, with virtual competitions, Eagle Ridge beat Apple Valley High School and won the Minnesota State Championship, advancing to the National High School Mock Trial Competition in May 2021.

=== Theatre ===
The Academy has also competed in the Minnesota State High School League One-Act Play Competition since 2020. In 2021, Eagle Ridge won its subsection with Carry On, an original play written by student Ro Feitl and directed by theatre director Gabriel Berg.

=== School newspaper ===
The Academy's official student-run publication, The Citizen, was founded by then-freshmen Erik Teder and Muthu Meenakshisundaram. It was originally an all-print publication, moving online in response to COVID-19.

== School board ==
The Eagle Ridge Academy School Board has seven seats. The Executive Director is a non-voting ex-officio member. Of the seven members, at least one must be a parent, one must be a teacher, and one must be a community member, but Eagle Ridge's updated bylaws specify that no group may hold a clear majority. In practice, three parents, three teachers, and one community member have been elected, but other configurations are possible. Each person is elected to a two-year term, but elections are held every year so the Board is a continuous body.
