= Every Child Has Opportunities Charter School =

Location
- 101 Rocket Avenue; Echo, Minnesota; United States; 44.6173°N 95.4101°W

Information
- Type: Charter school
- Established: 1997
- Faculty: 11.41 (on FTE basis)
- Grades: PreK to 12
- Enrollment: 60 (2019–20)
- Student to teacher ratio: 5.26:1
- Mascot: Rockets
- Website: www.echo.charter.k12.mn.us

Every Child Has Opportunities (ECHO) Charter School is a charter school located in Echo, Minnesota, United States. The school serves about 60 students in pre-kindergarten through twelfth grade.

== Geography ==
According to the United States Census Bureau, the city of Echo Minnesota has a total area of 1.0 square miles (2.6 km²), all of it is land and none of it is covered in water.

== History ==
Echo became a charter school in the fall of 1997.

== Extracurricular activities ==
Dinner Theater is an extracurricular activity at Echo Charter School.

Other extracurricular activities include Choir, Band, Football, Volleyball, Basketball, Knowledge Bowl, and Track. Choir and Band are classes that consists of music. The ECHO music program is mandatory for elementary and underclassmen. For High School it is just a credit class that is an option for them. The football team is called the Rockets. This team was formed in the 2008–2009 school year. Volleyball is also new to ECHO they also formed the same year as the Football team. Knowledge Bowl is an extra class that tests your knowledge in all sorts of subjects. They compete in tournaments against other schools around the region. Basketball is a sport that has been at Echo for a while. ECHO Charter School has built a gym that hosts basketball and volleyball games. Track is a new sport at ECHO this school year 2010–2011.
