= GFW High School =

Location
- 1001 Cottonwood St; Winthrop, Minnesota; United States; 44.5438°N 94.3675°W

Information
- Type: Public
- Motto: Fostering Lifelong Learners in a Caring Environment
- Established: 1987
- School district: GFW Schools
- Superintendent: Tami Martin
- Principal: Bernie Sauter
- Staff: 17.32 (FTE)
- Grades: 9 - 12
- Enrollment: 214 (2022–2023)
- Student to teacher ratio: 12.36
- Campus type: Rural
- Colors: Red, black, and gold
- Team name: Thunderbirds
- Website: https://www.gfw.k12.mn.us/page/high-school

GFW High School is a secondary school located in Winthrop, Minnesota, United States. It is part of the GFW Schools school district.

== Academics ==
Four Advanced Placement courses are offered (Government, Calculus, Literature, and Biology). At the end of these courses students take an exam, and depending on their score they may earn college credits.

== Athletics ==
The school offers the following sports:

=== Fall ===
- Football
- Volleyball
- Cross Country

=== Winter ===
- Basketball (boys/girls)
- Wrestling (paired with Nicollet)
- Dance Team

=== Spring ===
- Baseball
- Softball
- Track (boys/girls)
- Golf (boys/girls)

GFW is a member of the Tomahawk conference for all sports except football (which the conference doesn't offer). For football, GFW is a member of the Gopher Valley AA conference.
