= Kato Public Charter School =

Coordinates: 44.164567°N 93.996186°W

Location
- 110 North 6th Street; Mankato, Minnesota 56001; United States

Information
- Teaching staff: 7.34 (FTE) (as of 2012–13)
- Grades: 6–12
- Enrollment: 67 (2012–13)
- Student to teacher ratio: 9.13 (as of 2012–13)
- Colors: Turquoise, Black, and White
- Nickname: Kodiaks
- Website: www.katopcs.org

Kato Public Charter School was a charter school in Mankato, Minnesota, United States. The school opened as RiverBend Academy in September 2000 and rebranded as Kato Public Charter School in 2014. Kato Public is part of the EdVisions Schools co-op and is in its own independent school district, ISD #4066.

== Structure ==
The school has around 70 students from grades 6–12 and five general education teachers (called advisors), plus art and a special education department, Title I staff, and other educational and support staff.

Education at Kato Public centers on project-based learning. With the help of their advisors, students create projects that cover the Minnesota Graduation Standards. There are also regular field trips to organizations around the community and experts are brought in to teach students about particular topics.

== History ==
In 1995, the Mankato Area Public Schools (ISD #77) formed a group to look at alternatives for public education in the area. Two years of discussion resulted in the founding of Bridges Community School, which was run by ISD #77 and initially served children in grades 5-6 (and later expanded to cover grades K-6). Recognizing the need for alternative educational opportunities for older students, work continued and a model was developed for a secondary-level charter school. In September 2000, the charter school opened its doors (as RiverBend Academy) to more than 150 students.

As of the 2009–10 school year (the most recent year for which data is available as of August 2011), Kato Public served 69 students in grades 6–12. The majority of students (60) were in grades 9–12, with just 9 students in grades 6–8, according to the National Center for Education Statistics.

In 2010, Kato Public celebrated its tenth anniversary, succeeding in a state where 37 of 200 charter schools have closed their doors since Minnesota first allowed charter schools in 1992.

The charter school rebranded itself as Kato Public Charter School for the 2014 school year.

== Closing ==
In April 2025, it was revealed that Kato Public Charter School would not be opening for the 2025–2026 school year, and instead would be closing permanently due to test scores under state standards.
