= SouthWest Metro Intermediate District =

SouthWest Metro Intermediate District 288

Location
- 4601 Dean Lakes Blvd. Shakopee, Minnesota 55379; United States
- Coordinates: 44.781°N 93.460°W

Information
- Type: Public Intermediate
- Opened: 2016
- Administrator: Dr. Jeff Horton
- Grades: K-12
- Gender: Coed
- Campus: Suburban
- Colour: Purple
- Website: http://www.swmetro288.org

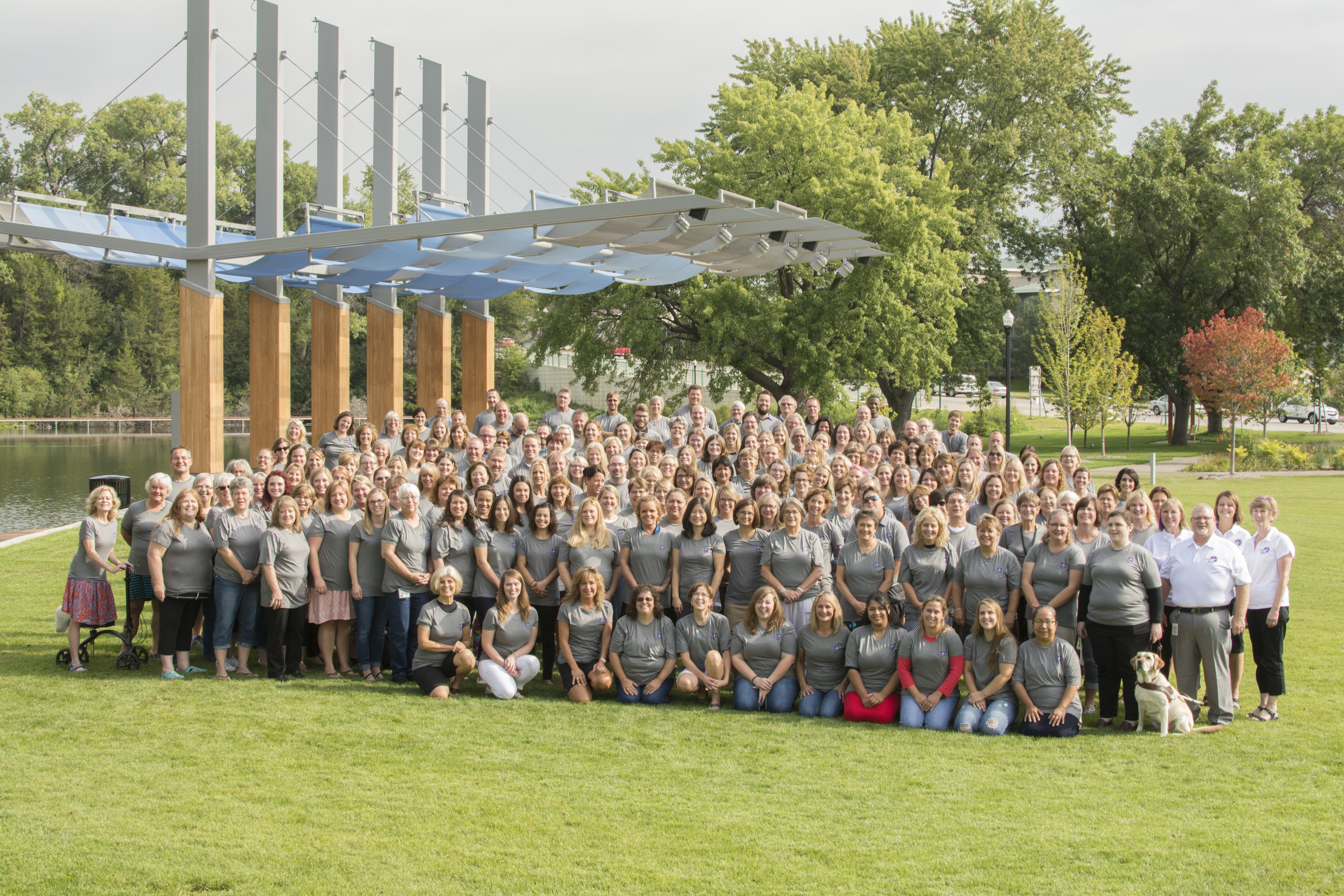
SouthWest Metro staff at the start of the 2016–2017 school year.

The SouthWest Metro Intermediate District #288 is a merged school district in Minnesota, United States. SouthWest Metro is the fourth Intermediate District in the State of Minnesota.

== Composition ==
The district was formed on July 1, 2016 by member public school districts:

SouthWest Metro was given the required statutory authorization during a Special Session of the Minnesota Legislature in 2015. Following the authorization, the member districts of the SouthWest Metro Educational Cooperative voted to dissolve the Educational Cooperative and reorganize as an Intermediate School District. Buffalo-Hanover-Montrose Independent School District #877 was not a member of the Educational Cooperative, but became a founding member of the Intermediate District by unanimous approval of the ten Educational Cooperative member school districts.

=== SouthWest Metro Educational Cooperative ===
The SouthWest Metro Educational Cooperative #6088 was the precursor to the SouthWest Metro Intermediate District #288. The Cooperative was formed on July 1, 2013, as a joint powers cooperative school district. The Educational Cooperative resulted from the blending of The Minnesota River Valley Special Educational Cooperative (MRVSEC) which was formed in 1968 and the Carver-Scott Educational Cooperative (CSEC) which was formed in 1976. MRVSEC provided special education services to public school districts in and around Scott County Minnesota during its 45-year existence. CSEC was originally formed as a vocational cooperative by three public school districts: Eastern Carver County Schools (known as Chaska Public Schools at that time), Shakopee Public Schools, and Waconia Public Schools.

During the early 1980s, CSEC merged with the Minnesota River Valley Special Education Cooperative (MRVSEC), which had provided special education services to the public school districts in the greater Carver County Minnesota area since its formation in 1969.

CSEC provided Career and Technical Education, Alternative Education, Adult Basic Education, and Special Education prior to its merger with MRVSEC and the formation of the SouthWest Metro Educational Cooperative in 2013. Darren Kermes was the Executive Director of both MRVSEC and CSEC at the time of their merger and subsequently served as the Executive Director of SouthWest Metro Educational Cooperative.

== Programs ==
The SouthWest Metro Intermediate District provides services to learners of all ages in five primary areas:

- Adult Basic Education,
- Alternative Education,
- Career and Technical Education,
- Care & Treatment
- and Special Education.

SouthWest Metro programs are located in Jordan, Shakopee, Chaska, and St. Bonifacius, Minnesota.
