= Minnesota New Country School =

Coordinates: 44.529°N 93.903°W

- Henderson, Minnesota; Minnesota; United States

Information
- Type: Public
- Motto: Exploring the World Through Project Based Learning
- Established: 1993
- Staff: 37
- Grades: K-12
- Enrollment: 218
- Website: www.newcountryschool.com

Minnesota New Country School (MNCS) is a Charter school in Henderson, Minnesota, United States, established in 1993.

== History ==
The school's first year was 1994-1995 originally in Le Sueur, Minnesota.

In 1995 students discovered deformed frogs at a pond at the Ney Nature Center. The frogs were researched by scientists to discover the reason for the deformity. It was never decided was caused the frogs to be deformed.

MNCS was moved to Henderson in 1998 with a brand new building.

MNCS expanded from 6–12 to k-12 in 2013.
