= Community of Peace Academy =

Coordinates: 44°58′27″N 93°4′50″W

- Minnesota; United States

Information
- Type: Chartered public school l
- Established: 1995
- Website: https://www.cpapk12.org/

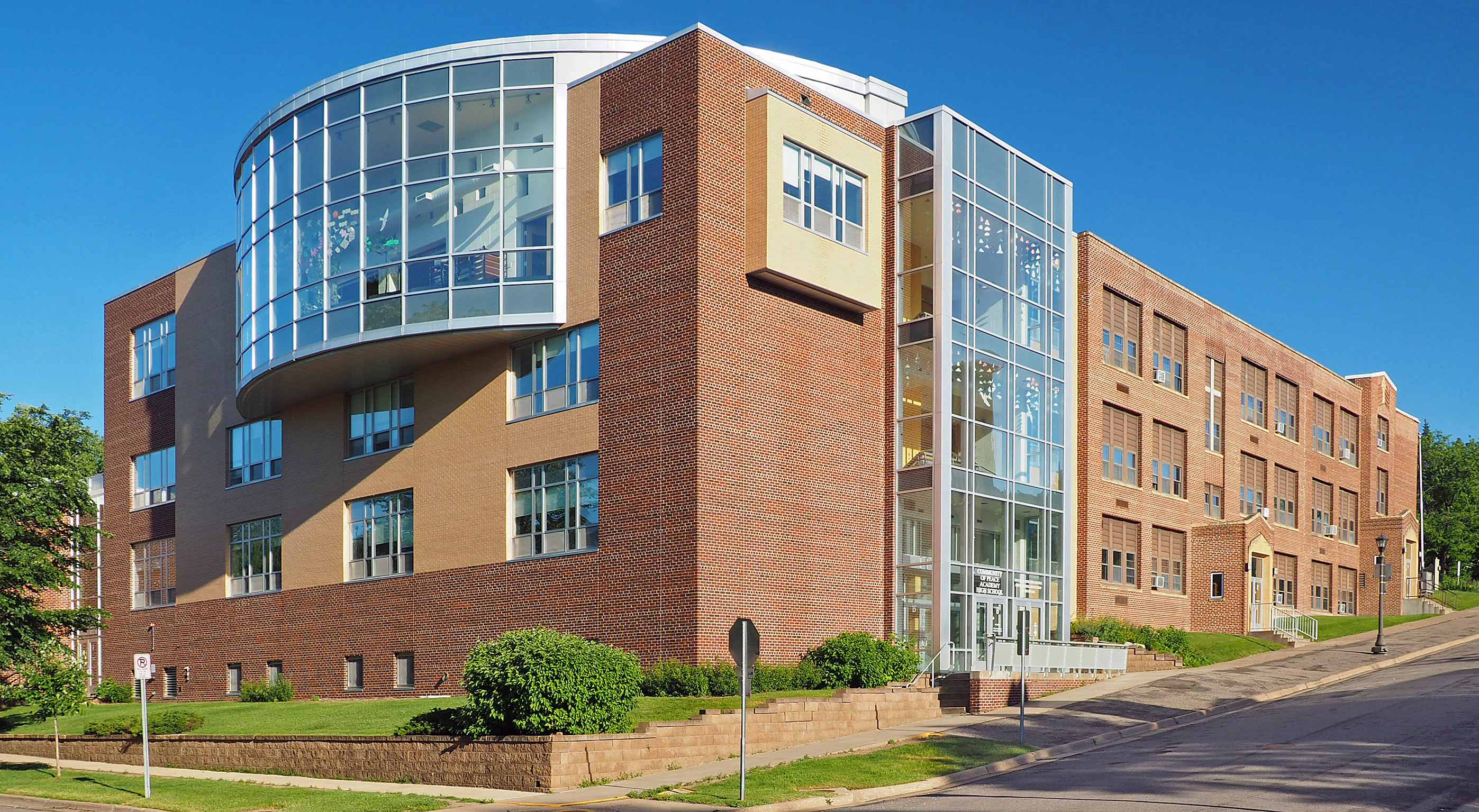
Community of Peace Academy from the northwest

Community of Peace Academy (CPA) is a chartered public school located in the East Side of Saint Paul, Minnesota, United States. Founded in 1995 by Dr. Karen Rusthoven, this former K-5 school has now grown to be a PreK-12 school with around 800 students. The school participates in the University of Minnesota's College in the Schools program.

== Student demographics ==
Community of Peace Academy serves a diverse population of around 800 students. According to the 2018 Minnesota Report Card published by the Minnesota Department of Education, 41.8% of the students at CPA are Asian, 24.7% are Hispanic or Latino, 23.5% are Black or African American, and 8.3% are White. 86.5% of students qualify for free or reduced-cost meals, and 25.3% are English Language Learners.
