= Alden-Conger High School =

Coordinates: 43°40′21″N 93°34′28″W

Location
- 215 N Broadway; Alden, Minnesota 56009; United States

Information
- Type: Public
- School district: ISD 242
- Principal: Jenny Hanson
- Teaching staff: 16.87 (FTE)
- Grades: 7–12
- Enrollment: 215 (2024-2025)
- Student to teacher ratio: 12.74
- Colors: Black, Silver and Red
- Athletics: Golf, football, baseball, volleyball, softball and basketball
- Mascot: (Formerly Blackhawks) Knights
- Song: Across The Field
- Website: www.alden-conger.org/apps/pages/index.jsp?uREC_ID=590237&type=d&pREC_ID=1077548

Alden-Conger High School is a public high school located in Alden, Minnesota, United States.

The first school district in Alden was formed in 1870.

Open Enrollment began at Alden-Conger during the 1990–1991 school year. Roughly half of the students that attend are open-enrolled students from other districts. Bus routes bring in students from Albert Lea, Kiester, New Richland, and Freeborn.

== Renovations ==
The initial school was a three-story building. The area where the football field, playgrounds, and baseball field are now used to be a cow pasture owned by a farmhouse located down the street from the school. There were also a fifth grade classroom and a sixth grade classroom located across the street from the school. Most of the second floor of the old school housed a home economics classroom. The workshop on the first floor was later replaced by the library/media center.

The Alden United Methodist Church, which was once located next to the school, was removed in order to create a staff parking lot.

In 1939, the school put together a fundraiser in order to add floodlights to the football field. The fundraiser was a success, and the lights were added.

July 2009 saw the addition of the LeVerne Carlson Fitness Center, which is still in use today.

In 2016, an addition was added to the north end of the building with a new elementary entrance, office, and classrooms.

== Sports history ==
In 1939 Alden-Conger had its first year of baseball. During the same year, the football team didn't lose a single home game, leaving them with five wins and three losses.

In 1940 track started with the first coach, Mr. H. Johnson.

The previous school mascot, the Blackhawks, changed in 1987 and became the Knights when the teams paired up with Freeborn High School. The elementary gymnasium/cafeteria is still called the "Blackhawks Gym".

Some of Alden-Conger's teams are combined with nearby schools. Their wrestling team is combined with Albert Lea High School; cheerleading, softball, baseball, and football teams are combined with Glenville-Emmons High School; and their cross country and track teams are combined with United South Central High School. Albert Lea High School also allows students from nearby districts join their other teams.

== Football ==
In 1946, the football team were undefeated during the Gopher Conference. They also were the Border League Champions in 1963. Then, in 1978, the Alden-Conger Blackhawks brought home a Class C State Championship. Later, they were Section 1 Champions of 1986. The next year, they made it one game away from state.

On September 13, 2014, Alden-Conger broke a 25-game losing streak against Heron Lake Okabena. The last win before that was in 2011.

Alden-Conger combined with Glenville Emmons High School during the 2018–2019 school year. The next year, ACGE went 0–9 in scoring. 2019-2020 also saw the addition of Casey Soost as the head football coach. The team switched from a 9-man team to an 11-man team.

At the beginning of the 2020–2021 school year, the first game was cancelled due to the COVID-19 Coronavirus.

== Basketball ==
Alden-Conger Freeborn lost in the section finals vs. Rushford Peterson in 1988.

The last time that the girls' basketball team went to state was in 1996–1997.

The Alden-Conger team has been combined with the Glenville Emmons team since 2018.

As of 2020, Chris Johansen is the men's Leading Scorer for Alden-Conger. His career point record is 1564 total points.

During the 2020–2021 season, the MSHSL board approved the Maximized Winter Season with 30% reduction in contests (with a maximum of two per week), allowing three contests in the last two weeks for Covid-related rescheduling.

== Trap shooting ==
Alden-Conger joined the Minnesota State High School Clay Target League in 2012. Before that, FFA members had been competing in fall invitationals hosted by other FFA chapters across southern Minnesota. The Clay Target League in Alden-Conger is unique in that students from 6-12 grades are allowed to join, as opposed to just the high school students.

The Alden-Conger team has had 7 students named to the MSHSCTL All-State Team.

In 2019, the team placed 3rd at the National High School Clay Target Championship in Mason, MI.

== Supermileage ==
The Supermileage program began in 1992. Students in grades 7-12 can join.

The Alden-Conger team has taken part in several national competitions. They have been to London three times (2016, 2017, 2019), Italy once (2017), Sonoma, CA twice, Detroit, MI three times, and Houston, TX three times.

In 2016, the Alden-Conger team finished in first place in the Urban Concept Diesel category at the Shell Eco-Marathon in Detroit. This earned the team their first trip to London to compete in the first-ever Drivers World Championship. Driver Isaac Sorensen made a last-second pass of American rival Mater Dei to earn 3rd place in the world. The team has also achieved several first-place finishes in the State Supermileage competition at Brainerd, MN.
