= Glenville-Emmons School District =

Public school district in Minnesota, United States

Glenville-Emmons Public Schools, Independent School District 2886, is a comprehensive community public school district headquartered in Glenville, Minnesota, United States.

The district serves Glenville and Emmons areas in Freeborn County.

The district was established in 1991 by the consolidation of two previously separate school districts in Glenville and Emmons.

The current Superintendent of Schools is Brian Shanks, who is also the Superintendent for a neighboring school district, Alden-Conger. Glenville-Emmons' football, cheerleading, softball, and baseball teams are combined with that district. Students can also join Albert Lea High School's sports, mock trial, and robotics team.

== Schools ==
Schools in the district (with 2012–13 enrollment data) are:

Elementary School

- Glenville-Emmons Elementary

in Glenville, Minnesota.
Grades PK-6.
100+ students.
Jeff Tietje, principal

High school

- Glenville-Emmons High School

Grades 7–12.
100+ students.
Jeff Tietje, principal
