= Lowell Music Magnet School =

Lowell Elementary School

Location
- Duluth, Minnesota; USA
- Coordinates: 46°48′50″N 92°7′19″W

Information
- Type: Public Elementary School
- Principal: Eve Hessler
- Colors: Red and White
- Mascot: Lion
- Website: Lowell Music Magnet

Lowell Music Magnet School, which is now known as Lowell Elementary School is an elementary school in Duluth, Minnesota, United States. It serves students in grades K-5. It is a public school that also hosts two immersion programs, the Nueva Visión Spanish Immersion program and the Misabeekong Ojibwe Immersion program. Lowell Elementary School serves 694 students in grades KG-5.
