= German School of Oslo =

Coordinates: 59.9250°N 10.7258°E

Deutsch-Norwegische Schule Oslo (DSO)
- Den tysk-norske skolen i Oslo
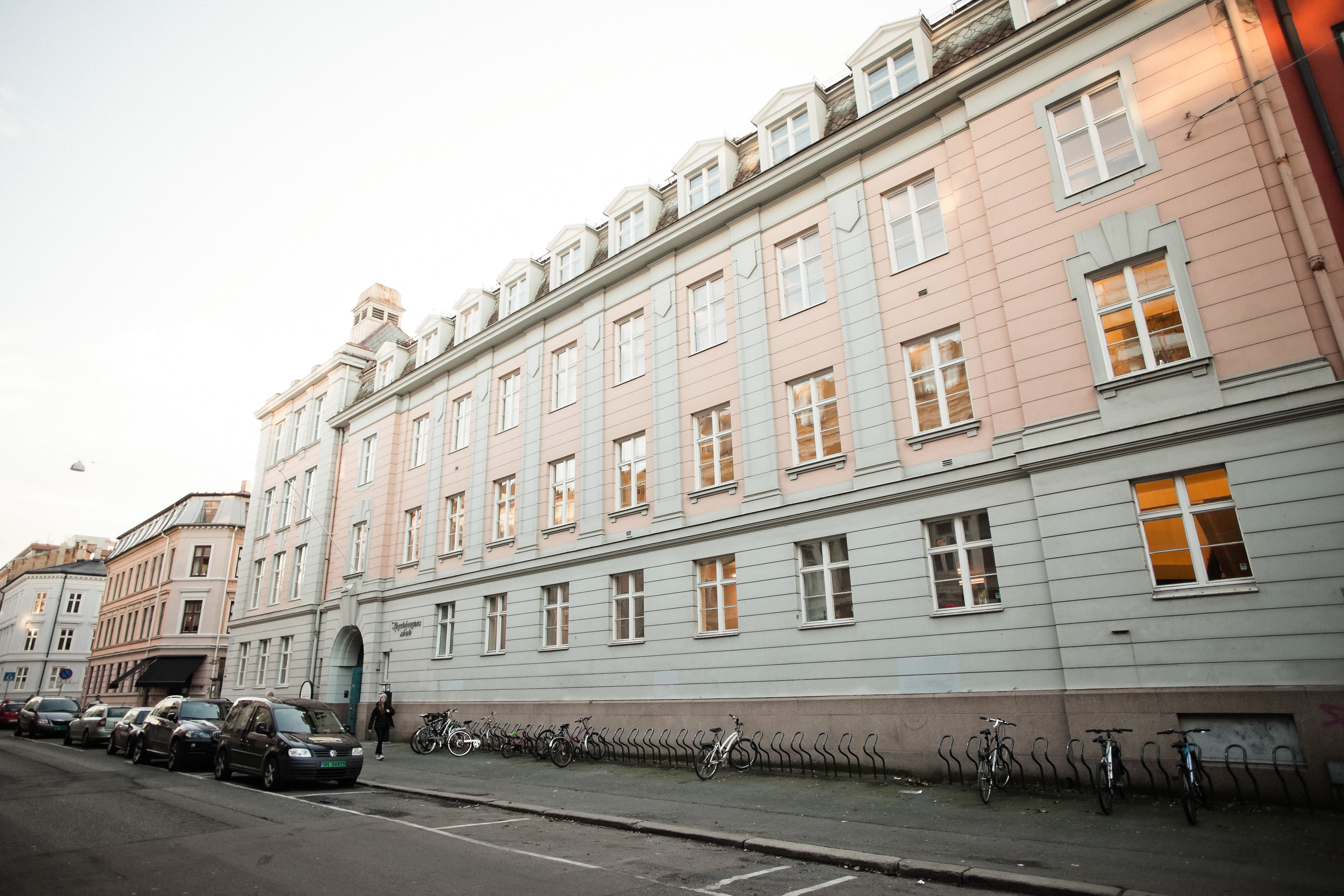
- Facade of the school in Sporveisgata

Location
- Sporveisgata 20; Oslo, Oslo Kommune; Norway

Information
- Type: Private
- Established: 1980
- Principal: Oliver Schaefer
- Grades: 1–12
- Enrollment: approx 320
- Website: www.deutscheschule.no

The German School of Oslo (German: Deutsch-Norwegische Schule Oslo, Norwegian: Den tysk-norske skolen i Oslo, often abbreviated DSO) is a German-language school in Oslo, Norway, and is led by Oliver Schaefer. It is located in Sporveisgata 20 at Bislett, and was opened in 1980. In the beginning, the school was located in the basement of the German Protestant Community of Oslo (German: Deutsche evangelische Gemeinde) in Eilert Sundts gate 37, before it moved to Majorstuen School. In 1998, the DSO moved from Majorstuen to the disused Hegdehaugen Upper Secondary School, where it has been ever since.

The school is divided in 2 builds and comprises a kindergarten, a primary and upper secondary school. It is a private school, but it receives financial support from the Norwegian and German states. As of 2010, there were 320 students and 82 kindergarten children at the school.
