= Harbor City International School =

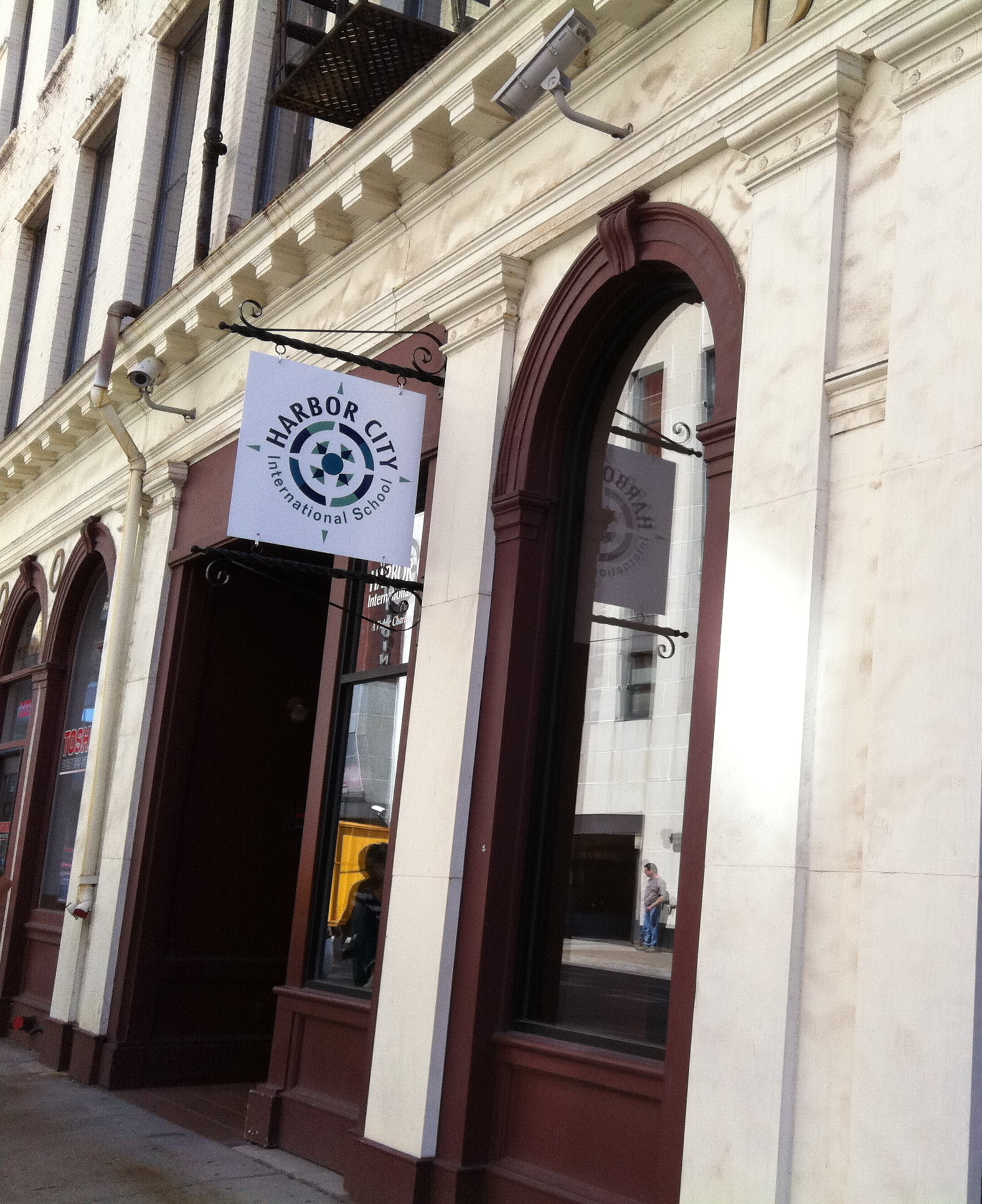
- Michigan Street Entrance

Location
- 332 West Michigan Street; Duluth, Minnesota 55802; United States; 46°47′00″N 92°06′05″W

Information
- Type: Charter
- Motto: Reach, Respect, Relationship and Responsibility
- Established: 2002
- Director: Paul McGlynn
- Teaching staff: 21.19 (on an FTE basis)
- Grades: 9–12
- Enrollment: 231 (2017–18)
- Student to teacher ratio: 10.90
- Colors: Blue and Black
- Website: harborcityschool.org

Harbor City International School, also known as Harbor City or HCIS, is a charter secondary school in Duluth, Minnesota, United States, that opened in fall 2002. It serves students in grades nine through twelve. The school is governed by an eight-member board of directors.

== History ==
The school opened in 2002 on the third floor of a 19th-century plumbing supply warehouse in downtown Duluth, which was renovated to provide expandable instructional spaces, "cave" and "get away" spaces, and support for project-based learning. The adaptation received a 2002 DesignShare Award. Two years later the school expanded onto the fourth floor and doubled its enrollment to about 200, and in 2008, with the assistance of a grant, added performance space on the second floor.

== Demographics ==
The demographic breakdown of the 231 students enrolled in 2017–18 was:

- Male - 47.2%
- Female - 52.8%
- Native American/Alaskan - 3.9%
- Asian - 3.5%
- Black - 3.9%
- Hispanic - 2.6%
- White - 82.2%
- Multiracial - 3.9%

34.2% of the students were eligible for free or reduced-cost lunch. For 2017–18, this was a Title I school.
