= Yellow Medicine East High School =

Location
- 450 9th Ave; Granite Falls, Minnesota 56241; United States
- 44°48′38″N 95°32′43″W

Information
- Other name: Yellow Medicine East Secondary
- NCES District ID: 2700099
- NCES School ID: 270009903539
- Principal: Stacy Hinz
- Teaching staff: 25.89 (on an FTE basis)
- Grades: 6–12
- Enrollment: 321 (2024–25)
- Student to teacher ratio: 12.40
- Color
- Athletics conference: Camden Conference
- Mascot: Sting
- Nickname: YME Sting
- Website: mshs.isd2190.org

Yellow Medicine East Middle School High School is a small town high school (grades 6–12) located at 450 9th Avenue, Granite Falls, Yellow Medicine County, Minnesota, United States. The school mascot is the "Sting," which resembles the Georgia Tech Yellow Jacket. The Yellow Medicine East school district is the result of the merger of neighboring communities' schools. The majority of students from Granite Falls, Clarkfield, Hazel Run, Hanley Falls, Echo attend Yellow Medicine East Schools.

== Notable alumni ==
- Larry Cole, a former American football defensive lineman in the National Football League for the Dallas Cowboys.

== See also ==
- List of high schools in Minnesota
