= Performing Institute of Minnesota Arts High School =

Coordinates: 44.871832°N 93.410940°W

- 7255 Flying Cloud Drive; Eden Prairie, Minnesota 55344; United States

Information
- Website: www.pimartshs.org

Founded in 2002 by Stages Theatre Company and the Hopkins School District, the Performing Institute of Minnesota Arts High School (PiM Arts High School), formerly Main Street School of Performing Arts, is a tuition free public charter school for grades 9 through 12, sponsored by the University of St. Thomas, and located in Eden Prairie, Minnesota, United States.

PiM Arts High School is open to all high school students throughout the metro area and meets all graduation requirements of the State of Minnesota. The school offers Advanced Placement classes in all academic areas, as well as beginning through advanced level classes in 7 different fields; Media Arts, Visual Arts, Vocal Music, Instrumental Music, Theatre, Musical Theatre, and Dance. A placement audition is required for the students who focus on performance, while students who focus on visual arts need to show off some of their work in a portfolio.

PiM was a silver award winner in U.S. News & World Report's Best High School Rankings for 2012 and also received a Reward School 2012 recognition from the Minnesota Department of Education.

== Location ==
PiM Arts High School is located on Flying Cloud Drive in Eden Prairie, Minnesota. The building consists of a bottom level (the main bulk of the building) and a small trapezoid of second level (for math and science classes). The bottom level consists of a large wing for English and History classes as well as the studios for visual arts and a large theater for those who focus on theater performance. There is also a large wing dedicated to the rest of the performance arts (vocal music, instrumental music, dance, and musical theater).

== Activities ==
At PiM Arts High School there are many opportunities for new students including art showcases, quarterly shows that allow students to perform and display artwork called "No Shames", plays, dances, musicals, and galleries. There have also been several outreach opportunities such as painting murals after the murder of George Floyd and subsequent protests.

== Students ==
PiM Arts High School enrolls approximately 300 students annually. Class size averages 10 to 30 students.
