= Cathedral High School (New Ulm, Minnesota) =

Private high school in New Ulm, Minnesota, United States

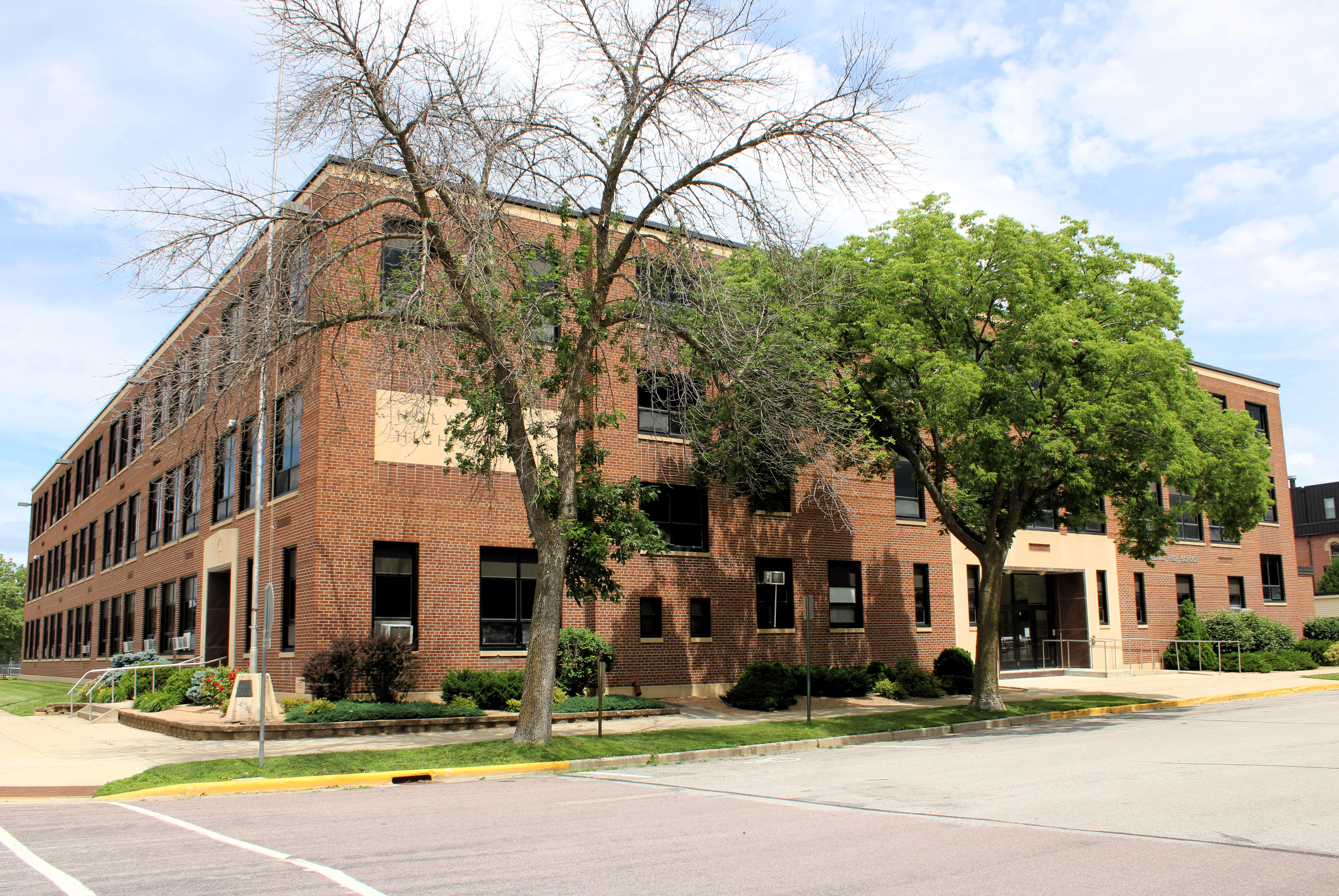
- Cathedral High School in 2024

Location
- 600 North Washington Street; New Ulm, Minnesota 56073-1896; United States; 44°19′2″N 94°28′7″W

Information
- Type: Private high school
- Motto: Sit laus Deo
- Religious affiliation: Roman Catholic
- Established: 1919; 107 years ago
- Oversight: Diocese of New Ulm
- Teaching staff: 47.8 (on an FTE basis) (2017–18)
- Grades: 7–12
- Enrollment: Approximately 200 (2023–24)
- Student to teacher ratio: 13.9 (2017–18)
- Colors: Burgundy and white
- Athletics conference: Tomahawk Conference
- Nickname: Greyhounds
- Alumni: Gary Schultz, Anton Pyan
- Website: www.nuacs.com/cathedral-high-school

Cathedral High School is a private, Roman Catholic high school in New Ulm, Minnesota, United States. It is located in the Diocese of New Ulm.

== History ==
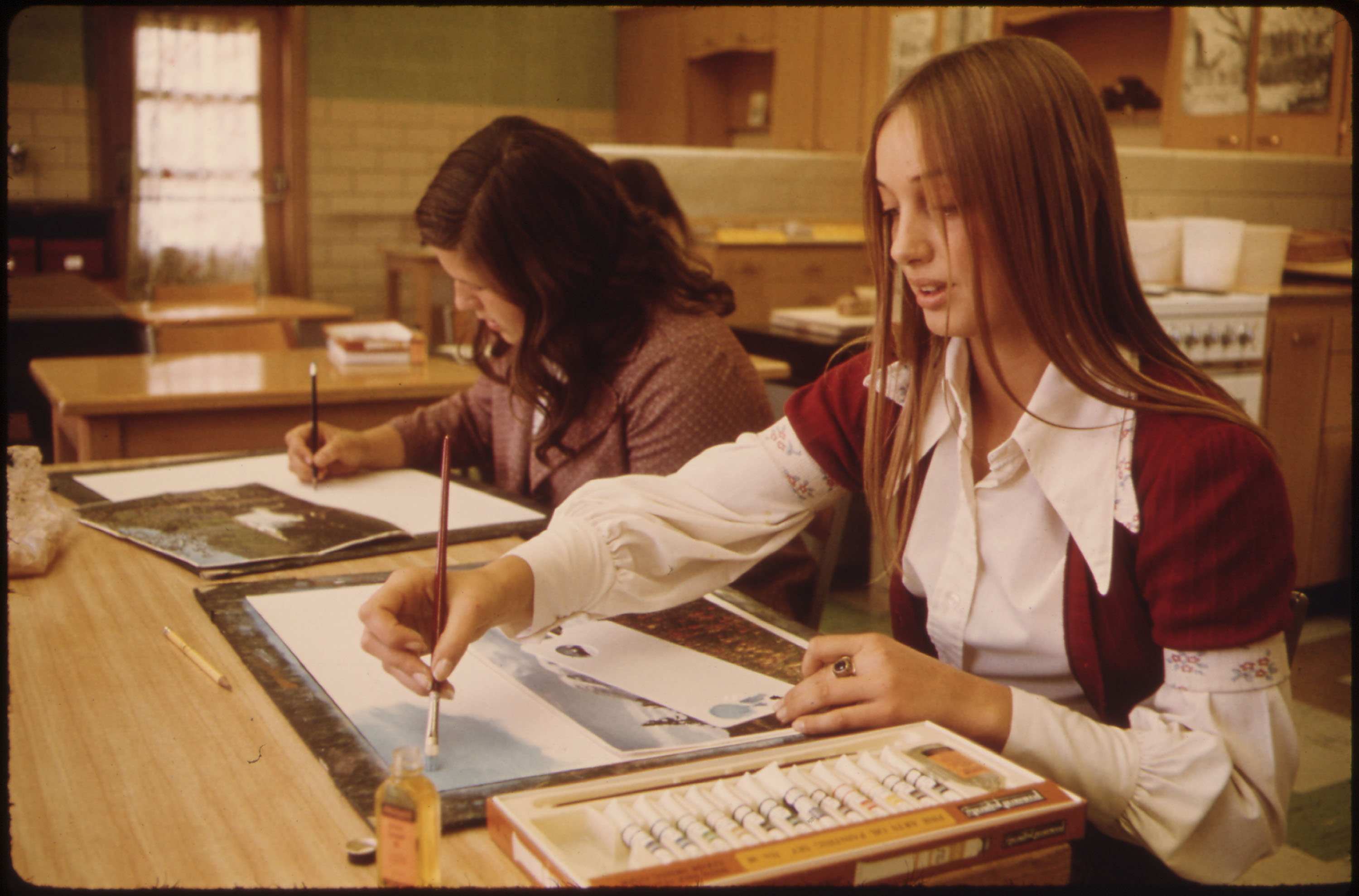
Art students in the 1970s

Cathedral High School is part of New Ulm Area Catholic Schools and traces its roots back to 1872, and opened in 1919 after the local parochial school added a secondary school class. A new school building was constructed in 1920.

Throughout its history, the school has undergone three name changes; Catholic High School of New Ulm in 1919, Holy Trinity High School in 1937, and renamed Cathedral High School in 1963.

In the 1960s, the school had about 400 students. The school worked with the local school district to have students take some courses in the New Ulm public school system.

== Athletics ==
The school baseball team is known for winning the 1951 Catholic state championship. They also earned a trip to the Minnesota State Tournament in 2021, and winning 3rd place at state in 2022. The school Robotics program has managed to send teams the world championship three times.

== Notable alumni ==
- David Rysdahl, actor.
