= Winthrop, Minnesota =

City in Minnesota, United States

Winthrop
- City
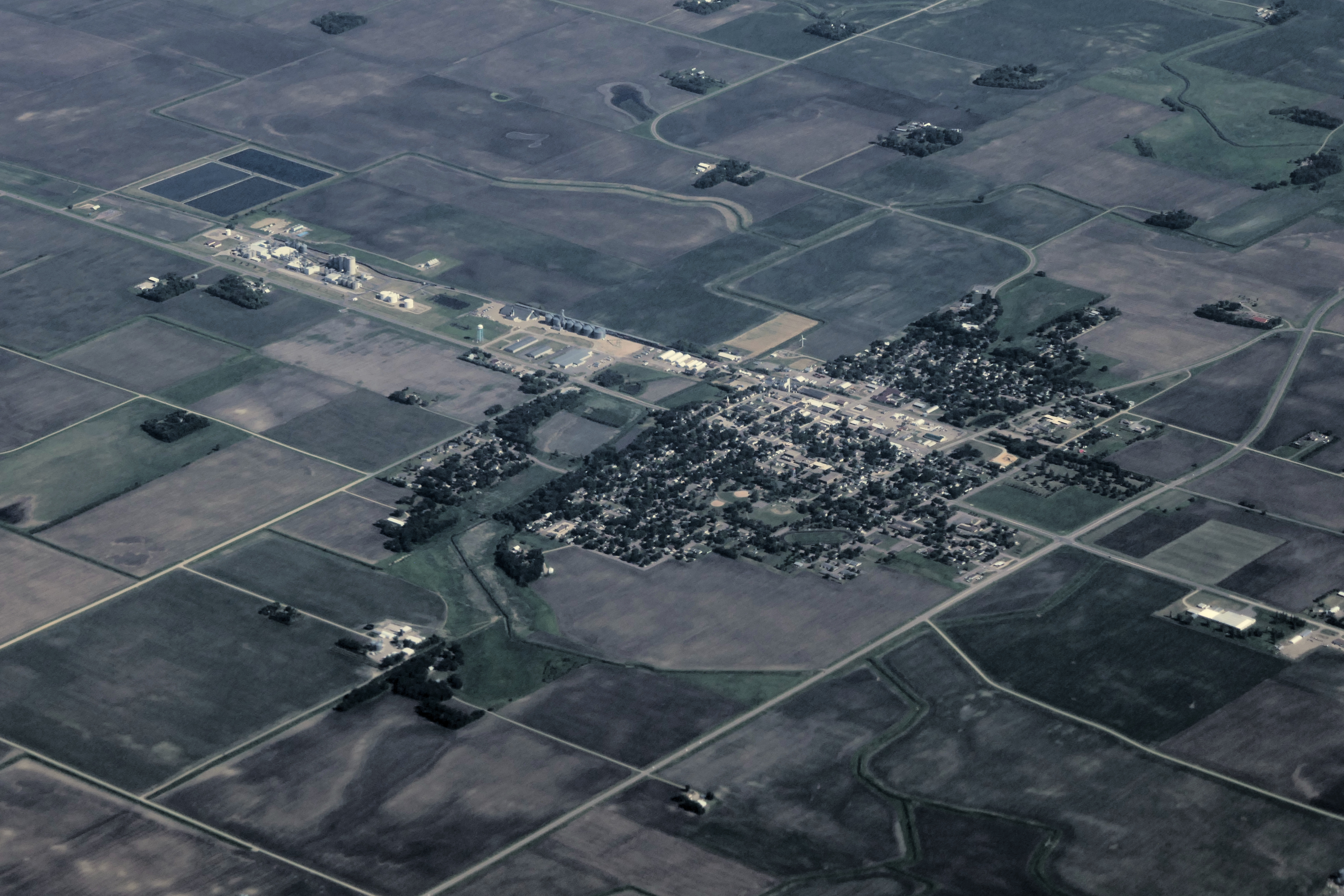
- Motto: "Preserving The Past, Creating The Future"
- Location of Winthrop within Sibley County, Minnesota
- Coordinates: 44°32′32″N 94°21′36″W
- Country: United States
- State: Minnesota
- County: Sibley

Government
  - Type: Mayor – Council
  - Mayor: Robert Edwards

Area
  - Total: 1.27 sq mi (3.30 km^{2})
  - Land: 1.27 sq mi (3.30 km^{2})
  - Water: 0 sq mi (0.00 km^{2})
- Elevation: 1,007 ft (307 m)

Population (2020)
  - Total: 1,332
  - Density: 1,044.4/sq mi (403.24/km^{2})
- Time zone: UTC-6 (Central (CST))
  - Summer (DST): UTC-5 (CDT)
- ZIP code: 55396
- Area code: 507
- FIPS code: 27-71122
- GNIS feature ID: 2397352
- Website: https://winthropmn.gov/

Winthrop is a city in Sibley County, Minnesota, United States. The population was 1,332 at the 2020 census.

== History ==
A post office called Winthrop has been in operation since 1882. Winthrop was incorporated as a city in 1910.

== Geography ==
According to the United States Census Bureau, the city has a total area of 1.06 square miles (2.75 km^{2}), all land. The South Branch of the Rush River starts near Winthrop.

Minnesota State Highways 15 and 19 are two of the main routes in the city.

== Demographics ==
Historical population
| Census | Pop. | Note | %± |
|---|---|---|---|
| 1890 | 488 | | — |
| 1900 | 813 | | 66.6% |
| 1910 | 1,048 | | 28.9% |
| 1920 | 1,147 | | 9.4% |
| 1930 | 1,037 | | −9.6% |
| 1940 | 1,195 | | 15.2% |
| 1950 | 1,251 | | 4.7% |
| 1960 | 1,381 | | 10.4% |
| 1970 | 1,391 | | 0.7% |
| 1980 | 1,376 | | −1.1% |
| 1990 | 1,279 | | −7.0% |
| 2000 | 1,367 | | 6.9% |
| 2010 | 1,399 | | 2.3% |
| 2020 | 1,332 | | −4.8% |
U.S. Decennial Census

=== 2010 census ===
At the 2010 census, there were 1,399 people, 574 households and 355 families living in the city. The population density was 1,319.8 per square mile (509.6/km^{2}). There were 640 housing units at an average density of 603.8 per square mile (233.1/km^{2}). The racial make-up was 93.4% White, 0.5% African American, 0.7% Native American, 0.5% Asian, 3.9% from other races, and 1.1% from two or more races. Hispanic or Latino of any race were 7.4% of the population.

There were 574 households, of which 28.0% had children under the age of 18 living with them, 48.6% were married couples living together, 8.7% had a female householder with no husband present, 4.5% had a male householder with no wife present and 38.2% were non-families. 33.8% of all households were made up of individuals, and 18.8% had someone living alone who was 65 years of age or older. The average household size was 2.36 and the average family size was 2.97.

The median age was 41.7 years. 25.9% of residents were under the age of 18; 5.1% were between the ages of 18 and 24; 21.7% were from 25 to 44; 25.3% were from 45 to 64; and 22% were 65 years of age or older. The gender make-up was 47.7% male and 52.3% female.

=== 2000 census ===
At the 2000 census, there were 1,367 people, 591 households and 346 families living in the city. The population density was 1,303.8 per square mile (503.4/km^{2}). There were 632 housing units at an average density of 602.8 per square mile (232.7/km^{2}). The racial make-up was 93.71% White, 0.07% African American, 0.29% Native American, 0.15% Asian, 4.54% from other races and 1.24% from two or more races. Hispanic or Latino of any race were 6.95% of the population.

There were 591 households, of which 26.1% had children under the age of 18 living with them, 48.7% were married couples living together, 6.8% had a female householder with no husband present, and 41.3% were non-families. 38.7% of all households were made up of individuals, and 21.5% had someone living alone who was 65 years of age or older. The average household size was 2.22 and the average family size was 2.96.

23.7% of the population were under the age of 18, 6.1% from 18 to 24, 23.3% from 25 to 44, 21.2% from 45 to 64, and 25.6% were 65 years of age or older. The median age was 43 years. For every 100 females, there were 88.3 males. For every 100 females age 18 and over, there were 83.6 males.

The median household income was $34,813 and the median family income was $47,159. Males had a median income of $31,149 and females $20,573. The per capita income was $18,188. About 3.5% of families and 6.1% of the population were below the poverty line, including 5.7% of those under age 18 and 8.2% of those age 65 or over.

== Education ==
Winthrop is the site of ISD #2365's high school.
