= Charter school =

Type of school that operates independently of the local public school system

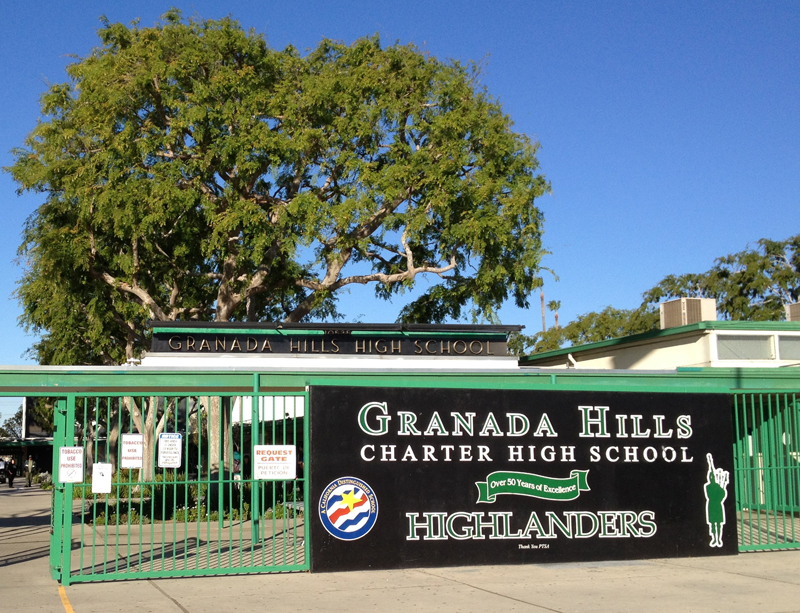
In 2003, Granada Hills Charter High School in Los Angeles became the largest charter school in the United States.

A charter school is a type of publicly-funded school that receives government funding but operates independently of the established state school system in which it is located.

== Nature ==
Charter schools are publicly-funded schools that operate independently from their local district. Charter schools are often operated and maintained by a charter management organization (CMO). CMOs are typically non-profit organizations and provide centralized services for a group of charter schools. There are some for-profit education management organizations. Charter schools are held accountable by their authorizer. There is debate on whether charter schools should be described as private schools or state schools. Advocates of the charter model argue that they are public schools because they do not charge for tuition. Critics of charter schools assert that charter schools' private operation with a lack of public accountability makes them more like private institutions subsidized by the public.

== By country ==
=== Australia ===
All Australian private schools have received some federal government funding since the 1970s. Since then they have educated approximately 30% of high school students. None of them are charter schools, as all charge tuition fees.

Since 2009, the Government of Western Australia has been trialling the Independent Public School (IPS) Initiative. These public schools have greater autonomy and could be regarded as akin to 'charter' schools (but the term is not used in Australia).

=== Bulgaria ===
The first charter school in Bulgaria, 151 General Education School with Interest-Based Profiles, was established in 1990 in Sofia, Bulgaria.

=== Canada ===
The Canadian province of Alberta enacted legislation in 1994 allowing charter schools. The first charter schools under the new legislation were established in 1995: New Horizons Charter School, Suzuki Charter School, and the Centre for Academic and Personal Excellence. As of 2015, Alberta remains the only Canadian province that has enabled charter schools.

There are 23 charter school campuses operated by 13 Alberta charter schools. The number of charter schools was limited to a maximum of 15, but the Provincial government eliminated this cap effective September 2020.

=== Chile ===
Chile has a very long history of private subsidized schooling, akin to charter schooling in the United States. Before the 1980s, most private subsidized schools were religious and owned by churches or other private parties, but they received support from the central government. In the 1980s, the dictatorship of Augusto Pinochet promoted neoliberal reforms in the country. In 1981 a competitive voucher system in education was adopted. These vouchers could be used in public schools or private subsidized schools (which can be run for profit). After this reform, the share of private subsidized schools, many of them secular, grew from 18.5% of schools in 1980 to 32.7% of schools in 2001. As of 2012, nearly 60% of Chilean students study in charter schools.

=== Denmark ===
Free primary schools have long existed in Denmark, often with roots in Grundtvig's folk high school movement. Many other independent schools have a religious focus or cater for the German-speaking minority in Schleswig. Danish private schools have often been set up on the initiative of a group of parents. Around 75% of pupils' costs are covered by the public purse, with the remainder paid by parents. A supervisor, appointed by the parents, checks that teaching of core subjects meets the standards of the elementary school. Some 90 000 pupils (15% of schoolchildren) attend Danish private schools. Profits in Danish private schools stay in the business.

=== England and Wales ===
The United Kingdom established grant-maintained schools in England and Wales in 1988. They allowed individual schools that were independent of the local school authority. When they were abolished in 1998, most turned into foundation schools, which are really under their local district authority but still have a high degree of autonomy.

Prior to the 2010 general election, there were about 200 academies (publicly funded schools with a significant degree of autonomy) in England.

=== Finland ===
In 2007, there were 75 private general education schools in Finland. Of these, 47 were members of the Association of Private Schools. In addition to special education schools, 13% of the pupils in its member schools were in adult secondary schools, 8% in language schools, 8% in special education schools (Steiner schools and Freinet schools) and 5% in Christian schools. According to the Finnish Broadcasting Corporation, twenty of the private schools were Christian in 2011.

Private schools started to be established in Finland in the mid-19th century, reaching a peak of 346 schools between 1965 and 1966, before their number started to decline in the late 1960s and 1970s due to municipalisations, nationalisations and closures. More than 80% of Finnish upper secondary schools were originally founded and run by a private association or limited company. Private primary schools need a licence from the Government and other educational institutions from the Ministry of Education to operate. Most private schools follow the national curriculum. Exceptions to this are international and foreign language schools (such as International Baccalaureate schools). Tuition fees may not be charged in Finnish private schools (with the exception of some foreign language schools), but the schools are financed by per pupil grants from the state and municipalities. The operator of a private school must be a non-profit-making organisation.

=== Germany ===
The operation of private preschools, primary and secondary schools is permitted in accordance with Art. 7 of the Grundgesetz (German constitution). They are regulated by the laws applying the federal state in which they are based and must not be "inferior to the state schools in terms of their educational aims, their facilities nor the professional training of their teaching staff". Furthermore "segregation of pupils according to the means of their parents" may not be encouraged. In return all private schools are supported financially by government bodies, comparable with charter schools. The amount of control over school organization, curriculum etc. by the state differs from state to state and from school to school. Average financial support given by government bodies was 85% of total costs in 2009.

=== Hong Kong ===
Some private schools in Hong Kong receive government subsidy under the Direct Subsidy Scheme (DSS). DSS schools are free to design their curriculum, select their own students, and charge for tuition. A number of DSS schools were formerly state schools prior to joining the scheme.

=== Ireland ===
Irish Charter Schools were set up mostly in the 1700s by the Church of Ireland to educate the poor. They were state or charity sponsored, but run by the church. The model to copy was Kilkenny College, but critics like Bernard Mandeville felt that educating too many poor children would lead them to have unrealistic expectations. Notable examples are the Collegiate School Celbridge, Midleton College, Wilson's Hospital School and The King's Hospital.

=== New Zealand ===
Charter schools in New Zealand, labelled as Partnership schools | kura hourua, were allowed for after an agreement between the National Party and the ACT Party following the 2011 general election. The controversial legislation passed with a five-vote majority. A small number of charter schools started in 2013 and 2014. All cater for students who have struggled in the normal state school system. Most of the students have issues with drugs, alcohol, poor attendance and achievement. Most of the students are Maori or Pacific Islander. One of the schools is set up as a military academy. One of the schools ran into major difficulties within weeks of starting. It is now being run by an executive manager from Child, Youth and Family, a government social welfare organization, together with a commissioner appointed by the Ministry of Education. 36 organizations have applied to start charter schools.

=== Norway ===
As in Sweden, the publicly funded but privately run charter schools in Norway are named friskoler and was formally instituted in 2003, but dismissed in 2007. Private schools have since medieval times been a part of the education system, and is today consisting of 63 Montessori and 32 Steiner (Waldorf) charter schools, some religious schools and 11 non-governmental funded schools like the Oslo International School, the German School Max Tau and the French School Lycée Français, a total of 195 schools.

All charter schools can have a list of admission priorities, but only the non-governmental funded schools are allowed to select their students and to make a profit. The charter schools cannot have entrance exams, and supplemental fees are very restricted. In 2013, a total of 19,105 children were enrolled in privately run schools.

=== Spain ===
In Spain charter schools are called escuela concertada. They are educational centers for compulsory education (second cycle of kindergarten, primary and secondary education) that receive government funding and follow the official curriculum, but are privately owned. This model was established following the approval of the Organic Law on the Right to Education (LODE) approved by the Spanish Parliament in 1985, which aimed to ensure universal access to compulsory education, at a time when the public administration did not have enough of its own schools to meet educational demand, especially in rapidly growing neighborhoods. It is estimated that around 27% of students in Spain are enrolled in a charter school. Data for the 2024-2025 academic year indicate an approximate total of 1,262,492 students in the general system, with 901,267 in public schools (71%), 339,423 in charter schools (27%) and 21,802 in private schools (2%), although these figures are aggregated and not broken down by compulsory phase. According to the educational think-tank Fundació Bofill, Spain is among the 8 OECD countries with the greatest weight of charter-school education.

=== Sweden ===
The Swedish system of friskolor ("free schools") was instituted in 1992. These are publicly funded by school vouchers and can be run by not-for-profits as well as for-profit companies. The schools are restricted: for example, they are prohibited from supplementing the public funds with tuition or other fees; pupils must be admitted on a first-come, first-served basis; and entrance exams are not permitted. There are about 900 charter schools throughout the country.

=== United States ===
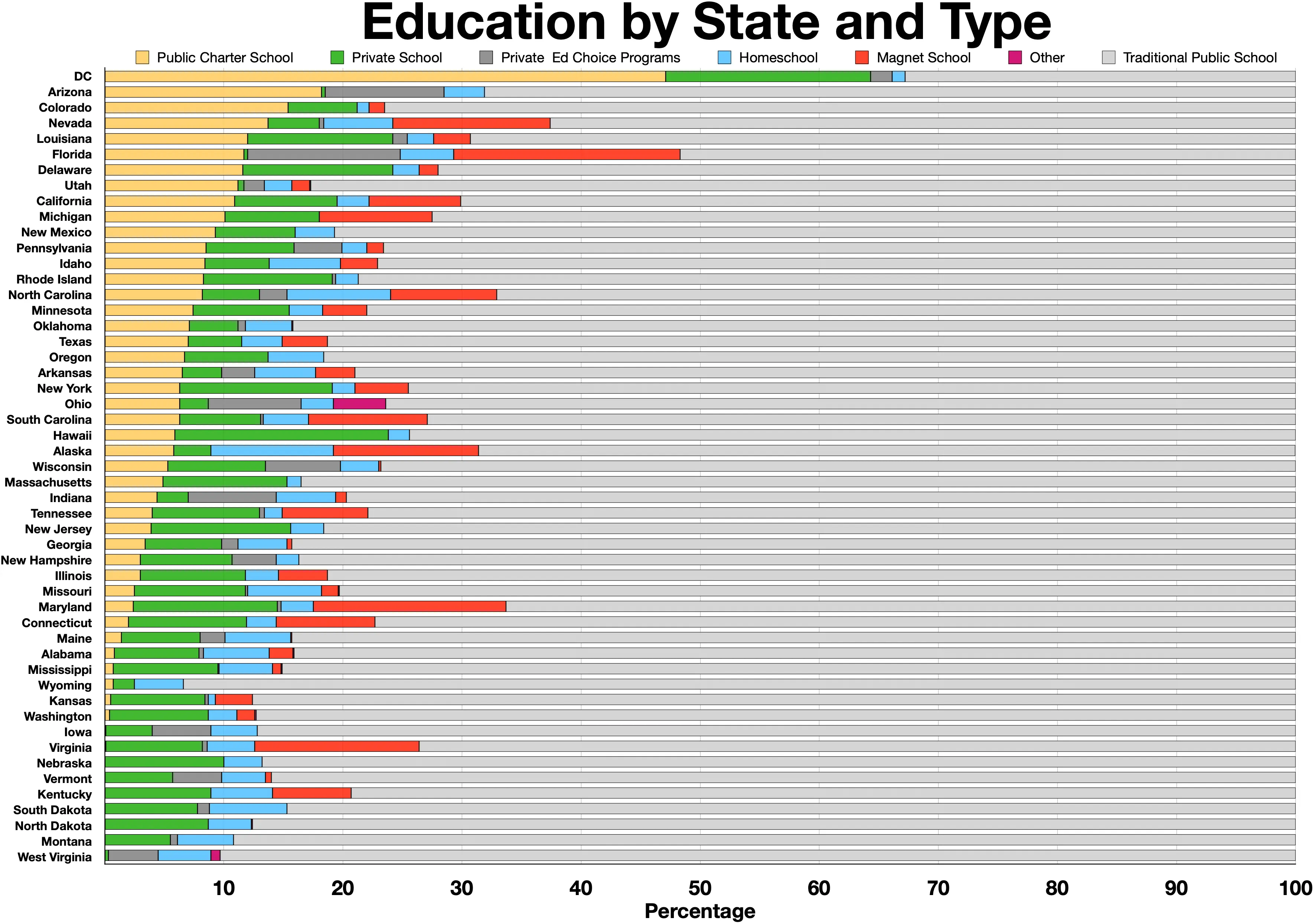
Charter school share in the United States by state Public charter school Private school Private EdChoice Homeschool Magnet school Public school

According to the Education Commission of the States, "charter schools are semi-autonomous public schools that receive public funds. They operate under a written contract with a state, district or other entity (referred to as an authorizer or sponsor). This contract – or charter – details how the school will be organized and managed, what students will be expected to achieve, and how success will be measured. Many charters are exempt from a variety of laws and regulations affecting other public schools if they continue to meet the terms of their charters." These schools, however, need to follow state-mandated curricula and are subject to the same rules and regulations that cover them, although there is flexibility in the way this is realized.

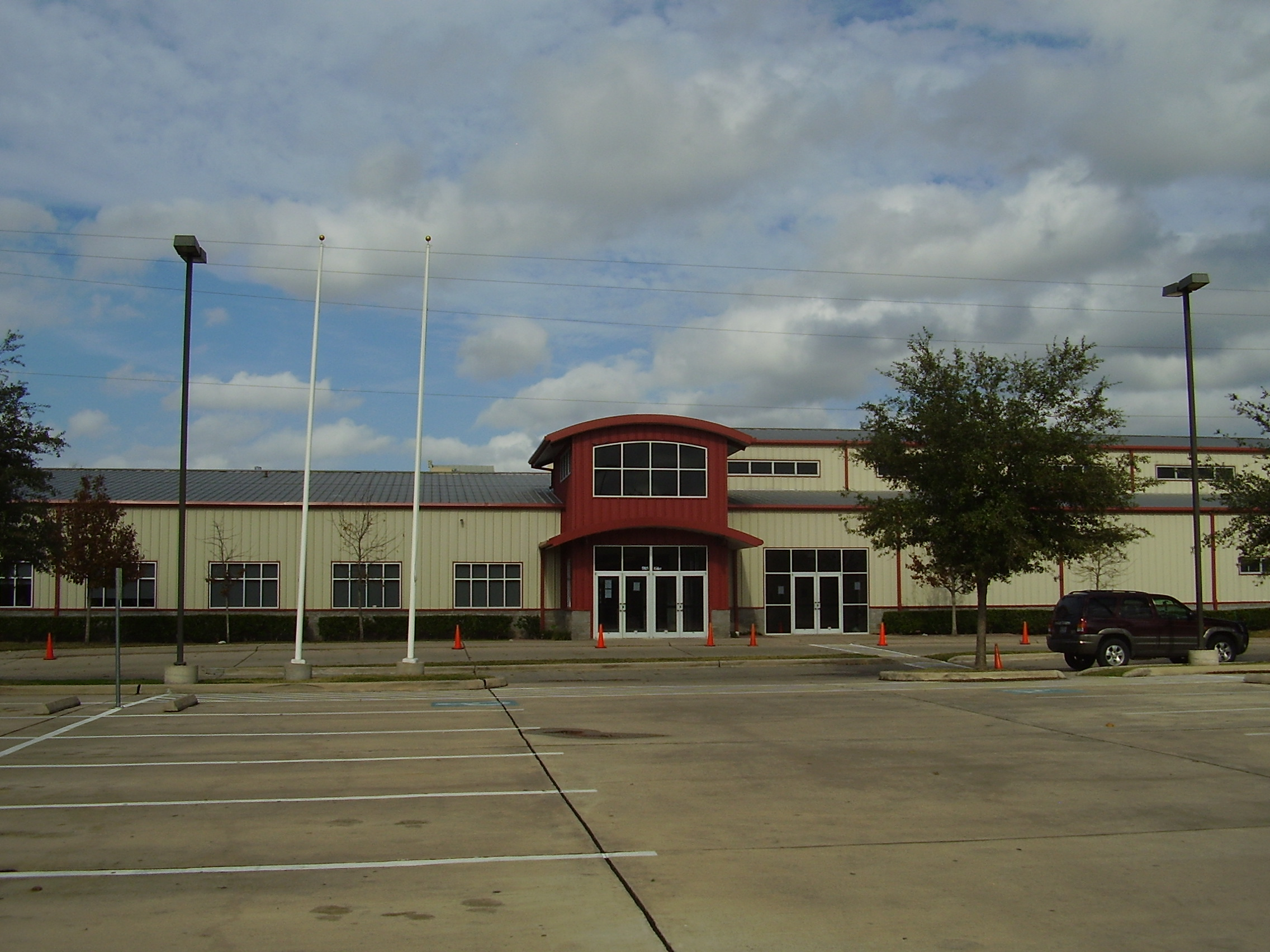
SER-Niños Charter School, a charter school in the Gulfton area of Houston, Texas

Minnesota passed the first charter school law in the United States in 1991. As of 2015, Minnesota had 165 registered charter schools, with over 41,000 students attending. The first of these to be approved, Bluffview Montessori School in Winona, Minnesota, opened in 1992. The first charter to operate was City Academy in St. Paul. Some specialized Minnesota charter schools include the Metro Deaf School (1993), Community of Peace Academy (1995), and the Mainstreet School of Performing Arts (2004).

As of December 2021 approximately 8,000 charter schools enrolled an estimated total of 3.7 million students nationwide. The numbers equate to 7.4% of total public school students. 291 new charter schools opened their doors in the 2021–22 school year, however the charter sector lost 15,047 students that year. 2020–21 marked one of the largest single-year increase ever recorded in terms of the number of additional students attending charter schools, but 2021–22 marked the first ever decline in enrollment.

The most radical experimentation with charter schools in the United States possibly occurred in New Orleans, Louisiana, in the wake of Hurricane Katrina (2005). As of 2009 the New Orleans Public Schools system was engaged in reforms aimed at decentralizing power away from the pre-Katrina public school board to individual charter school principals and boards, monitoring charter school performance by granting renewable, five-year operating contracts permitting the closure of those not succeeding, and parents the choice to enroll their children in almost any school in the district. New Orleans is one of two cities in the United States of America where the majority of school students attend charter schools. 78% of all New Orleans schoolchildren studied in charter schools during the 2011–12 school year. By May 2014 all but five of New Orleans' public schools were charter schools.

Unlike their public counterparts, laws governing charter schools vary greatly. The three states with the highest number of students enrolled in charter schools are California, Arizona, and Michigan. These differences largely relate to what types of public agencies are permitted to authorize the creation of charter schools, whether or not and through what processes private schools can convert to charter schools, and what certification, if any, charter school teachers require.

In California, local school districts are the most frequent granters of school charters. If a local school district denies a charter application, or if the proposed charter school provides services not provided by the local school districts, a county board consisting of superintendents from state schools or the state board of education can grant a charter. The Arizona State Board for Charter Schools grants charters in Arizona. Local school districts and the state board of education can also grant charters. In contrast, the creation of charter schools in Michigan can be authorized only by local school boards or by the governing school boards of state colleges and universities.

Different states with charter school legislation have adopted widely different positions in regard to the conversion of private schools to charter schools. California, for example, does not allow the conversion of private schools into charter schools. Both Arizona and Michigan allow such conversions, but with different requirements. A private school wishing to convert to a charter school in Michigan, for example, must show that at least 25% of its student population is made up of new students. Legislation in Arizona stipulates that private schools that wish to become charter schools within that state must have admission policies that are fair and non-discriminatory. Also, while Michigan and California require teachers at charter schools to hold state certification, those in Arizona do not.

Charter schools were targeted as a major component of the No Child Left Behind Act of 2002. Specifically, the act specifies that students attending schools labeled as under-performing by state standards now have the option to transfer to a different school in the district, whether it is a state, private, or charter school. The act also suggested that if a failing school cannot show adequate yearly progress, it will be designated a charter school.

As of 2005 there were almost 100 charter schools in North Carolina, the limit passed by legislation in 1996. The 1996 legislation dictates that there will be no more than five charter schools operating within one school district at any given time. It was passed in order to offer parents options in regard to their children and the school they attend, with most of the cost being covered by tax revenue. After the first several years of permitting charter schools in North Carolina, the authority to grant charters shifted from local boards of education to the State Board of Education. This can also be compared with several other states that have various powers that accept charter school applications.

A recent study found that more than a quarter of new charter schools had closed after 5 years, and after just 15 years of operation, about half had closed. As of 2015, 6,700 charter schools enroll approximately 2.9 million students in the United States.

==== Performance ====
There is dispute on whether charter schools are more effective than public schools. Several studies find that charter school students are generally more advanced in their education compared to their public school counterparts, and that disadvantaged children tend to perform better. For example, charter school students gain 16 days' learning in reading and six in math over their traditional public school peers, reversing previous trends where public school students performed equally or slightly better.

==== Cyber schools ====
Charter cyber schools operate like typical charter schools in that they are independently organized schools, but are conducted partly or entirely over the Internet. Proponents say this allows for much more flexibility compared with traditional schools.

For 2000–2001, studies estimated that there are about 45,000 online K–12 students nationally. Six years later, a study by Picciano and Seamon (2006) found that over 1 million students were involved. A study by Watson, Murin, Vashaw, Gemin, and Rapp found that cyber charter schools are currently (as of 2014) operating in all 50 states and the District of Columbia.

The increase of these online campuses has aroused controversy. In November, 2015, researchers at the University of Washington, Stanford University, and the Mathematica Policy Research group published the first major study of online charter schools in the United States, the "National Study of Online Charter Schools". It found "significantly weaker academic performance" in mathematics and reading in such schools when compared to conventional ones. The study resulted from research carried out in 17 US states which had online charter schools. It concluded that keeping online pupils focused on their work was the biggest problem faced by online charter schools and that in mathematics the difference in attainment between online pupils and their conventionally-educated peers equated to the cyber pupils missing a whole academic year in school.

Four states have adopted specific legislation tailored to cyber charter schools. One example is Arizona, which has about 3,500 students in cyber schools, about half of them cyber charter schools and the other half governed by traditional, brick-and-mortar public school districts. The cyber schools teach students from kindergarten to 12th grade, and the setting varies from being entirely online in one's home to spending all of the class time in a formal school building while learning over the Internet.

Cyber charter school diplomas have been unevenly valued by post-secondary institutions. Universities sometimes apply additional requirements or have cyber-charter quotas limiting the number of applicants. The US military also classifies non-traditional diplomas at a lower tier, although as of 2012 this could be bypassed by high ASVAB test scores.

==== Charter schools and public schools ====
In 2014, New Orleans became the first place in the United States to establish an all-charter school district, called the Recovery School District.

A 2017 policy statement from the National Education Association expressed its strong commitment to public schools. Charter schools are funded by taxpayers so there must be the same liability, transparency, safeguards, and impartiality as public schools. Forty-four American states along with the District of Columbia implement legislation on state charter schools. However, many states do not compel charters to abide by open meeting statutes as well as prerequisites on conflict of interest that pertain to school districts, boards, and employees.

The first Trump administration's Education Secretary Betsy DeVos, was a major proponent of school choice and charter schools.

== See also ==
- Bradley Foundation
- Charter School Growth Fund
- DreamBox (company)
- Broad Foundation
- Private school franchises
- Koch Family Foundations
- Walton Foundation
