= Tri-Metro Conference (Minnesota) =

- Classification: MSHSL 2A-4A
- Founded: 1975
- No. of teams: 9
- Region: Minnesota

The Tri-Metro Conference is a MSHSL-sanctioned athletic conference composed of schools found in the Twin Cities metro area. The conference competes in the majority of sports offered in the MSHSL. Most teams in the Tri-Metro compete in basketball and football tournaments at the AA or AAA level. While for the past twenty years a majority of schools in the conference had been private, the conference make up has changed in the past decade, with Brooklyn Center and St. Anthony, Columbia Heights and Fridley being public schools.

Conference membership has changed several times in recent years. Richfield High School joined the conference in 2019. The Academy of Holy Angels, Fridley High School, and Columbia Heights High School joined the conference in 2014, the latter two forced by the disbanding of the North Suburban Conference. These additions were coupled with the withdrawal of six of the traditional private school members at the same time, following the 2013–14 school year, citing differences in enrollment size between the newer members and the smaller private schools. Before these shifts, Brooklyn Center and St. Anthony rejoined the conference in the 2006–07 school year. The Tri-Metro initially rejected the applications of St. Anthony and Brooklyn Center for membership before the MSHSL placed the schools in the conference. Previously, the conference underwent a major team shift in the late 1990s. For the 1997–98 school year, St. Anthony and Brooklyn Center, which had been members, left the conference for the Metro Alliance Conference, along with Mahtomedi High School, Mound Westonka High School, and Orono High School; Farmington High School, which joined the Missota Conference, also departed at the same time. For the 1998–99 school year, St. Paul Academy, Visitation, and Mounds Park Academy left the Tri-Valley Conference to join the Tri-Metro, giving it the predominantly private school line-up had for years.

Tri-Metro teams compete in the following sports: tennis (girls and boys), soccer (girls and boys), football, cross country (girls and boys), basketball (girls and boys), volleyball (girls), track and field (girls and boys), softball, and baseball . They have had recent success at the state-level in competition. The Blake School won the MSHSL Challenge Cup in 2005, 2007, and 2009 as the most successful school in Minnesota at the Class A level. Since joining the Tri-Metro, DeLaSalle has won nine state championships in boys' basketball 1998, 1999, 2006, 2012, 2013, 2014, 2015, 2016, 2017), three in girls' basketball (2011, 2012, and 2013) and one in football (1999). In 2007, 2008, and 2009, the St. Croix Lutheran High School boys track & field team won the Minnesota True Team State Track and Field championship. St. Anthony won the 2006 and 2008 2A baseball state championships. Also in 2008, The Blake School won the Class A state title in boys Cross Country.

== Members ==
- Academy of Holy Angels
- Bloomington Kennedy High School
- Brooklyn Center High School
- Columbia Heights High School
- Convent of the Visitation School
- DeLaSalle High School
- Fridley High School
- Richfield High School
- Robbinsdale Cooper High School
- St. Anthony Village High School

=== Former members ===
- The Blake School
- Breck School
- Golden Valley
- Marshall-University High School
- Minnehaha Academy
- Mahtomedi
- Mounds Park Academy
- Orono High School (Long Lake, MN)
- Providence Academy
- St. Croix Lutheran High School
- St. Francis
- St. Paul Academy & Summit School
- Concordia Academy
- Saint Agnes High School
- St. Bernard’s High School
