= Metro Alliance =

- Classification: MSHSL
- Founded: 1997
- Ceased: 2005
- No. of teams: 8
- Region: Minnesota

The Metro Alliance was a Minnesota State High School League-sanctioned athletics conference that existed from 1997 to 2005. The conference was formed for the 1997-98 school year by seven schools. The majority of the schools came from the Tri-Metro Conference and included Brooklyn Center High School, Mahtomedi High School, Mound Westonka High School, Orono High School, and St. Anthony Village High School. Columbia Heights High School and Fridley High School, the other two founding members of the conference, left the North Suburban Conference to join. Farmington High School declined an invitation to be an eighth founding member; however, Benilde-St. Margaret's ultimately joined the conference as final school.

The break-up of the short-lived conference began soon after it formed. Mahtomedi left the Metro Alliance to join the new Classic Suburban Conference at the end of the 2000-01 school year. When the conference broke up in 2005, Fridley and Benilde-St. Margaret's joined the North Suburban Conference. St. Anthony and Brooklyn Center returned to the Tri-Metro after being placed by the Minnesota State High School League.

== Membership history ==
- Benilde-St. Margaret's - 1997-2005
- Brooklyn Center - 1997-2005
- Columbia Heights - 1997-2005
- Fridley - 1997-2005
- Mahtomedi - 1997-2001
- Mound Westonka - 1997-2005
- Orono - 1997-2005
- St. Anthony - 1997-2005

== Rivalries ==
- Columbia Heights vs. St. Anthony

== Notable athletes ==
- Devean George
