= Krumpelmann =

Krumpelmann is a surname. Notable people with the surname include:

- Edward Leo Krumpelmann (1909–1975), American priest, missionary, relief worker, medical aid worker, and educator
- Lydeke von Dülmen Krumpelmann (born 1952), Dutch sculptor and ceramist
