= Wilshire Park Elementary =

Wilshire Park Elementary may refer to:

- Wilshire Park Elementary, in the St. Anthony-New Brighton School District Minnesota
- Wilshire Park Elementary, on List of Los Angeles Unified School District schools, California
