= Silver Lake (St. Anthony, Minnesota) =

- Location within Minnesota
- Location: Minnesota
- Coordinates: 45°02′40″N 93°13′23″W
- Type: lake
- Max. width: 1.54 miles (2.48 km)
- Surface area: 73.2 acres (0.296 km^{2})

Silver Lake is a small lake primarily located in St. Anthony, Minnesota with a small portion in Columbia Heights, Minnesota.

== Geography ==
Silver Lake is about 73.2 acres (0.296 km^{2}) in size and 1.54 miles (2.48 km) in diameter.

There are two islands on this lake. One is part of Silverwood Park, and the other is uninhabited.

Silver Lake is surrounded by St. Anthony to the north, east, and south, and by Columbia Heights to the west.

The northern shore of Silver Lake is home to Silverwood Park and Silver Beach. The west and south shores are surrounded by upper-class houses. Not too far from the houses on the south shore is Silver Lake Village, a major commercial hub. The east shore is parallel to Silver Lake Road.

== Recreation ==
There are two parks along this lake. Silverwood Park is nestled on the north shore of the lake and is the larger and more popular of the two. West of Silverwood is Silver Beach, which is owned and operated by the Columbia Heights Recreation Department. Unlike Silverwood, it features a playground and a beach. A trail connects the two parks together.

The lake is popular for fishing, both from the boat access on the west end of the lake and for shore anglers. Population of the most prominent fish, including Walleye and Northern Pike, are below average in abundance. This is due to occasional winterkills.
