= Joseph Richard Pawlik =

American marine biologist

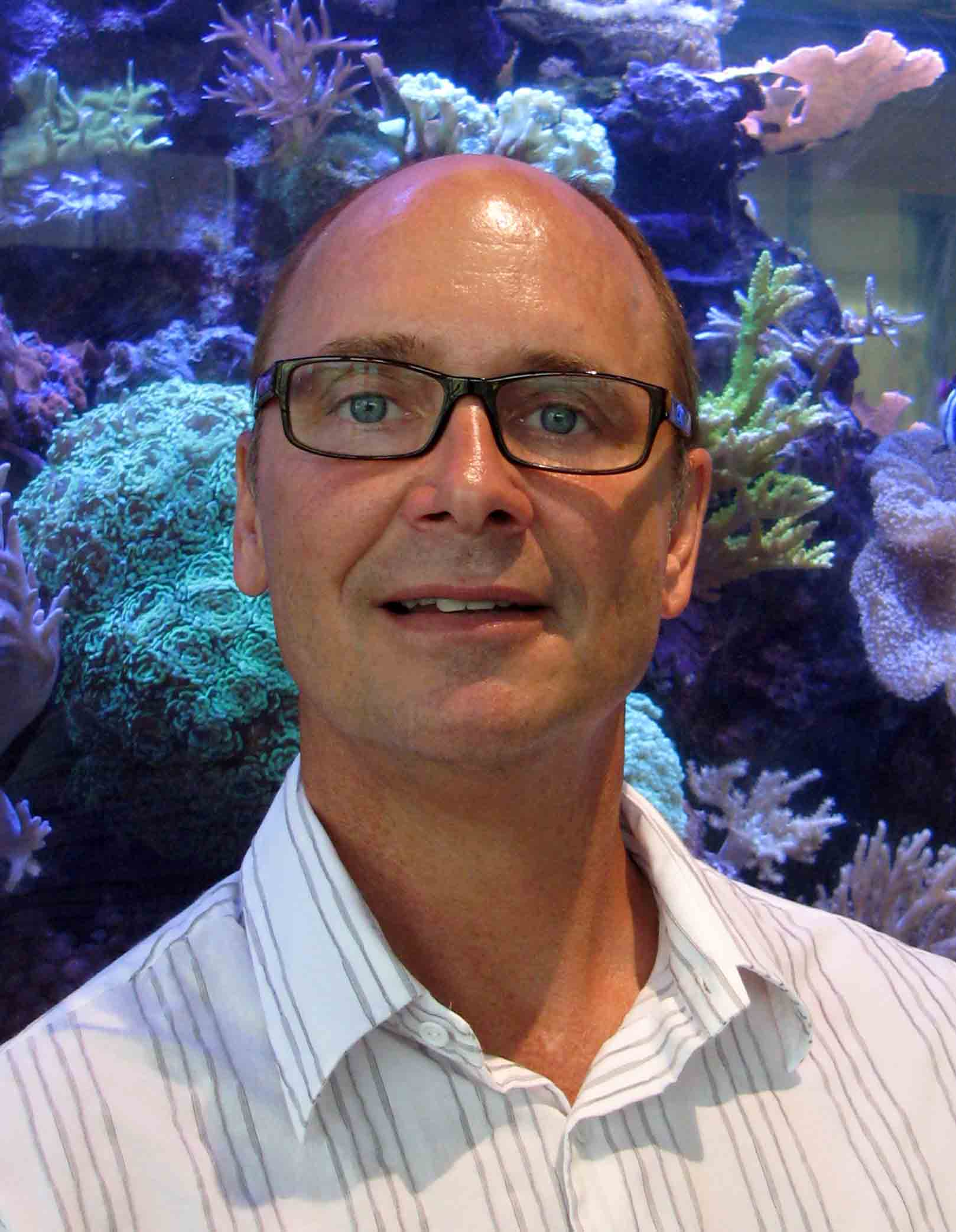
- Born: Minneapolis, Minnesota, United States
- Education: University of Minnesota; Scripps Institution of Oceanography; University of California, San Diego
- Known for: Ecology of sponges on Caribbean reefs
- Scientific career
- Fields: Zoology; Marine Biology; Chemical Ecology
- Workplaces: University of North Carolina Wilmington
- Doctoral advisor: D. John Faulkner; Nicholas D. Holland

Joseph Richard Pawlik is a marine biologist. He is the Frank Hawkins Kenan Distinguished Professor of Marine Biology in the Department of Biology and Marine Biology at the University of North Carolina Wilmington. He is best known for studies of sponges on Caribbean coral reefs that reveal ecological principles such as resource trade-offs, trophic cascades and indirect effects.

== Early life and education ==
Pawlik was born in Minneapolis, Minnesota to Richard Joseph Pawlik and Shirley Joyce (Reed) Pawlik as the third of 4 children. He credits his early childhood interest in marine biology to watching public television broadcasts of The Undersea World of Jacques Cousteau. He was raised in the City of St. Anthony Village, a suburb northeast of Minneapolis and graduated in 1978 from St. Anthony Village High School. In 1982, he graduated with a BS degree in Biological Sciences from the University of Minnesota, Twin Cities after taking summer courses his sophomore and junior years at the Bermuda Biological Station for Research, now BIOS.

== Work ==
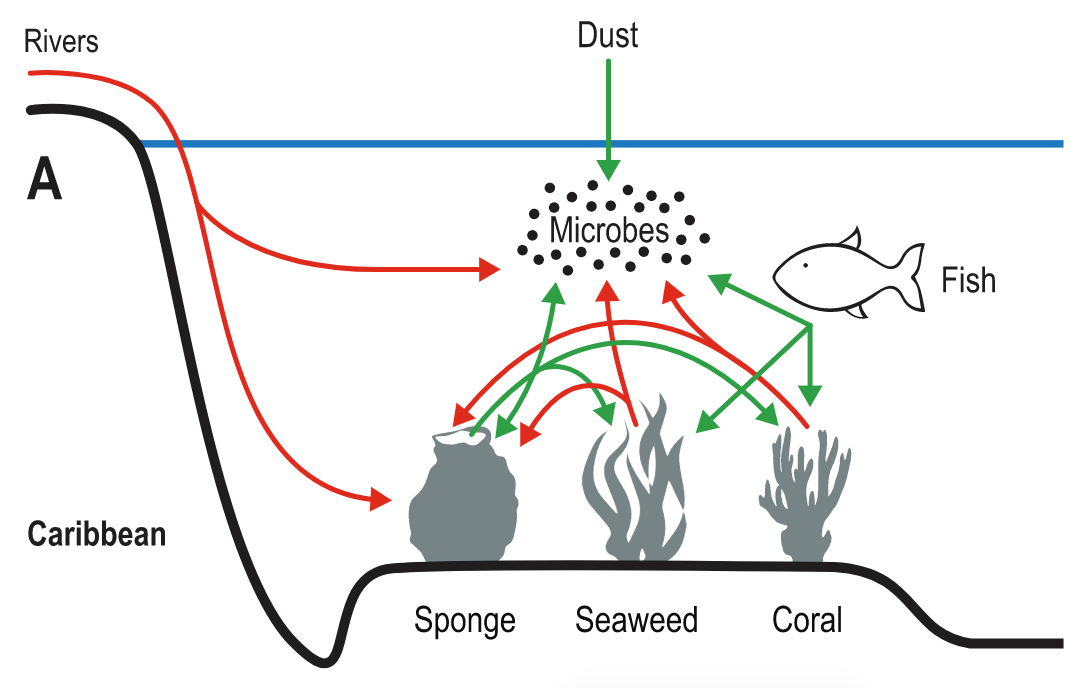
The vicious circle hypothesis for the lack of recovery of Caribbean coral reefs. The major component of the hypothesis is a feedback loop between sponges, which consume dissolved organic carbon and release plant nutrients, and seaweeds, which consume nutrients and release dissolved organic carbon.

Pawlik did his graduate research on the chemical cues that cause the planktonic larvae of marine invertebrates to metamorphose into sessile adults, focusing on sandcastle worms, a group of annelid worms that build tubes of sand that can form reefs. In collaboration with the natural products chemists in the laboratories of his mentors, D. John Faulkner and William Fenical, he began working on the chemical defenses of marine invertebrates, including limpets, gorgonian corals, and sea slugs. At UNCW, Pawlik began working on the chemical defenses of sponges on Caribbean reefs, a project that was funded by the National Science Foundation for over 23 years. With his students and collaborators, Pawlik characterized the chemical defenses of over 100 species of sponges across the Caribbean, and discovered a resource trade-off between the production of defensive secondary metabolites versus growth or reproduction among sponge species. Originally demonstrated with manipulative experiments, the resource-trade off was subsequently validated in surveys across the Caribbean by targeting reefs that were intensively overfished versus those that had been protected from fishing. On overfished Caribbean reefs, the absence of sponge predators resulted in the overgrowth of reef-building corals by fast growing, chemically undefended sponge species, providing unambiguous evidence to support fishing restrictions to protect coral reefs.

Most recently, Pawlik and colleagues have integrated the chemical defense-based ecosystem model with evidence of increasing sponge abundance and new data on carbon and nutrient cycling by sponges to propose the "vicious circle hypothesis" to explain the lack of resilience of Caribbean coral reefs relative to reefs in the Indo-Pacific. Sponge chemical defense data have also been used to suggest that much larger populations of hawksbill turtles once kept sponge growth in check on Caribbean reefs before turtles and turtle eggs were overharvested after European discovery and exploitation since the 1500s. This concept has been supported by analyses of sponge spicules from reef cores off Panama.

== Honors ==
- Frank Hawkins Kenan Distinguished Professor of Marine Biology, UNCW – 2017
- Honorary naming of Elysia pawliki by Dr. Patrick Krug – 2017
- Chief Scientist on 13 UNOLS research vessel cruises – 1998-2013
- Associate Program Director, Biological Oceanography, NSF – 2003-2005
- National Science Foundation Presidential Young Investigator Award – 1991

== Scientific debates ==
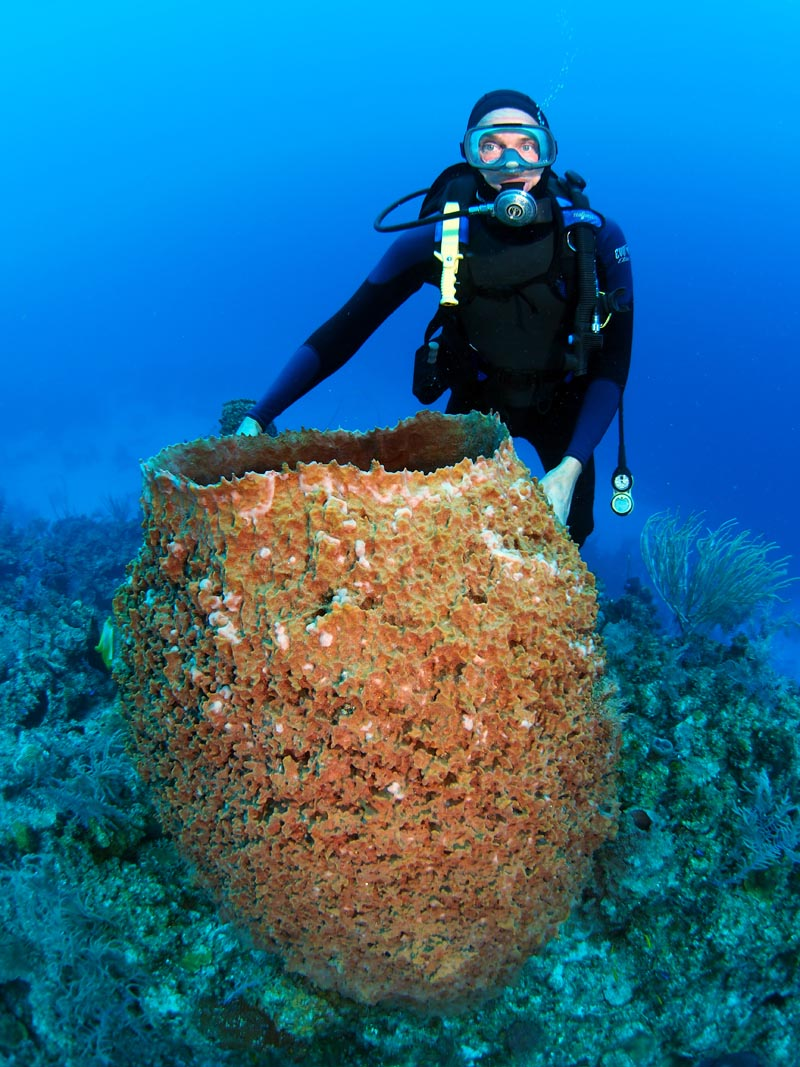
Pawlik behind a Caribbean giant barrel sponge, Xestospongia muta, on which his research group has published extensively.

Pawlik is a proponent of critical rationalism for the advancement of science; he discusses the concept in the courses he teaches and has openly challenged the conclusions of other studies throughout his career.

As a graduate student he contested the claim that neurotransmitters were related to the natural inducers of marine invertebrate larval settlement, arguing that the results of still-water, laboratory experiments with bioactive compounds were artifacts and not ecologically relevant.

Along with collaborators, he has challenged the idea that sponges of the genus Aplysina protect themselves with "activated" chemical defenses.

Among marine invertebrates, such as nudibranch molluscs, he has found little evidence for optimized chemical defense strategies, warning coloration, or mimicry.

More recently, Pawlik and colleagues have challenged the claim that sponge communities on Caribbean reefs are primarily controlled by bottom-up factors (food availability), instead asserting that community structure is primarily a product of top-down control (due to predation).

Related to food availability, he has also contested the "sponge increase hypothesis" (SIH) which contends that sponge abundance increases with depth through the mesophotic zone on tropical reefs. Pawlik and colleagues used photographs from ROV surveys of 3 Caribbean reefs to show the opposite trend in sponge abundance. Proponents of the SIH responded by dismissing all benthic abundance data derived from photographs on the grounds that they were affected by optical distortion, but this criticism was strongly refuted.

Pawlik and colleagues have found no evidence for an important component of the "sponge-loop hypothesis;" specifically, that large, emergent sponges on coral reefs produce large quantities of detritus that becomes food for particle-feeding invertebrates. They have also found no evidence that sponges with low microbial biomass consume dissolved organic material (DOM) from seawater.

== Videography ==
Pawlik has been an amateur underwater photographer since the 1980s, but recently turned to video to capture the current state of coral reef environments and to provide outreach related to his scientific publications. His videos are posted on YouTube at the channel "Pawlik Lab." Two short videos, "Sponges of the Caribbean" and "The maid did it!" were finalists in the Ocean 180 video challenge, a science video outreach competition sponsored by the National Science Foundation, in 2015 and 2016, respectively.

In a 2020 video, "Requiem for a Caribbean Reef", he captured the state of the coral reef off the West coast of the Turks and Caicos Islands after a 6 month period of bleaching and disease that had killed most of the living corals on the fore-reef between 5 and 30 m depth.

His YouTube channel also hosts archival underwater cinematography of coral reefs off the coasts of Cuba and the Florida Keys from the 1970s and 1980s before the widespread loss of coral cover.

== See also ==
- Chemical ecology
- Trophic cascade
