= Mahtomedi High School =

Coordinates: 45.0586444°N 92.9432152°W

Mahtomedi Senior High School
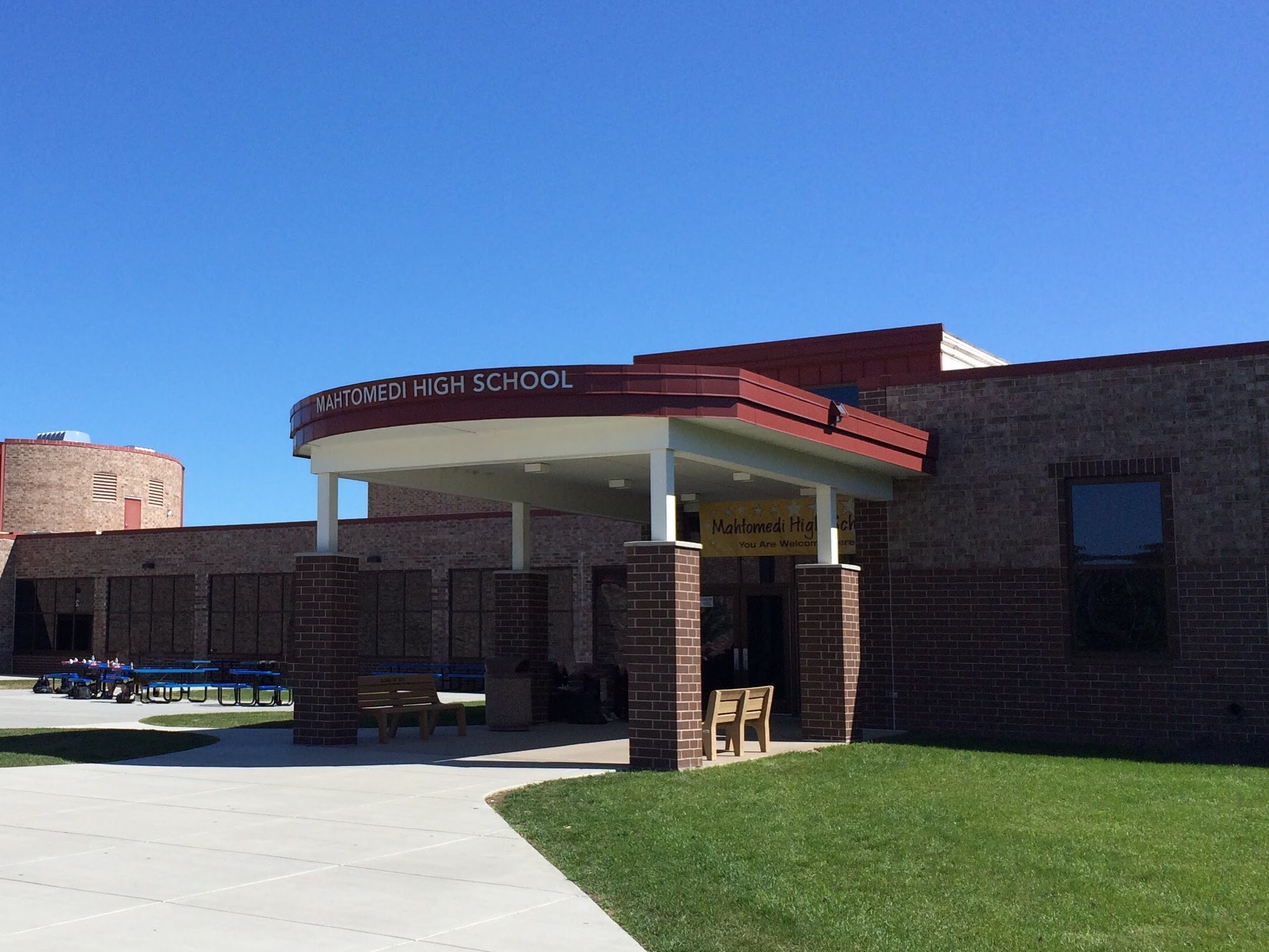
- The front of Mahtomedi High School

Location
- 8000 75th Street North; Mahtomedi, Washington County, Minnesota 55115; United States

Information
- Type: Public
- Established: 1930
- Principal: Justin Hahn
- Teaching staff: 53.84 (FTE)
- Grades: 9–12
- Enrollment: 1,164 (2023-2024)
- Student to teacher ratio: 21.62
- Campus type: Suburban
- Colors: Navy and gold
- Athletics conference: Metro East
- Mascot: Zephyrs
- Rivals: St. Thomas Academy, Hill Murray High School, North High School
- Website: Mahtomedi High School

Mahtomedi Senior High School is a four-year public high school located in Mahtomedi, Minnesota, United States. The school houses grades 9–12 with a total population of approximately 1,146 students. About 22% of this population are from surrounding districts due to open enrollment. The school colors are blue and gold, and the athletic teams are known as the Zephyrs. The district (district #0832) was created in 1870, and the original high school was built in 1930. In 1970 a new high school building was constructed several miles south east of the original building and this remains the current high school campus. Based on standardized test scores the State of Minnesota has awarded the school a five-star rating, the highest level that can be achieved. In 2006, Newsweek ranked the school #675 in its "List of the 1200 Top High Schools in America." The school has also made adequate yearly progress in compliance with No Child Left Behind standards. As of 2015 the school had a demographic of 91% Caucasian, 2% Black, 2% Asian, 2% Two or more races, 2% Hispanic or Latino, and 1% Native American. Finally, out of the total population, 9% of students qualify for free or reduced lunch, although since the coronavirus, the lunches and breakfasts have been free for all students. Mahtomedi competes in the Metro East Conference (formerly known as the Classic Suburban Conference), having joined that conference at its inception in 2001 soon after being a founding member of the Metro Alliance in 1997. Prior to 1997, Mahtomedi was a member of the Tri-Metro Conference.

The school was awarded the title "Exemplary High Performing Schools" along with being a profiled 2015 National Blue Ribbon School.

== Academics ==
Mahtomedi High School has a high ranking academic program. Among the top ranked 1,200 high schools in the nation, Mahtomedi placed 663rd. The chart below depicts Mahtomedi academic achievement in comparison to the Minnesota and United States averages for the 2006–2007 school year.

	Average ACT score	Average GPA	Graduation Rate
Mahtomedi	24.7	3.4	99%
Minnesota	22.3	3.2	92%
United States	21.3	3.0	70%

Some other notable academic accomplishments include Mahtomedi's 513 students taking advanced placement classes, and, of the students who take the AP exams after these classes, an 80% passing rate. About 90% of students continue on to college after graduation, and Mahtomedi High School has a dropout rate of 1%.

In 2006, the Mahtomedi School District proposed a plan to create a magnet program within the high school. This program will focus mainly on technology and engineering, to hopefully increase enrollment. As of 2017, the proposition has not been implemented.

Mahtomedi has a band program, with three band classes (Wind Orchestra, Wind Ensemble, and Percussion), and two before-school jazz bands.

== Athletics ==
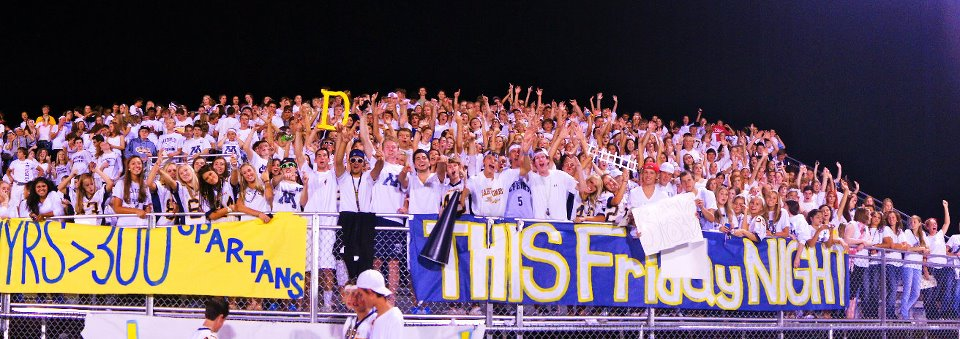
Mahtomedi High School students at a football game.

Mahtomedi High School competes in the Minnesota High School League, and has athletic teams for fall, winter and spring sports. These teams include boys' and girls' soccer, boys' and girls' cross country, football, girls' swimming and diving, volleyball, boys' and girls' tennis, boys' and girls' basketball, gymnastics, Alpine and Nordic skiing, boys' and girls' hockey, wrestling, baseball, softball, boys' and girls' golf, boys' and girls' lacrosse, and boys' and girls' track and field. All teams play at both the Junior Varsity and Varsity levels.

=== Athletic awards and honors ===
- Girls Tennis - 1 State Championship
- Boys Soccer - 1 State Championship
- Girls Soccer - 6 State Championships
- Boys Alpine Skiing - 9 State Championships
- Girls Gymnastics - 10 State Championships, 8 Sportsmanship Awards
- Football - 1 State Championship
- Wrestling - 2 State Champions
- Golf - 1 State Championship
- Boys and Girls Nordic Skiing - Numerous Conference and Section Championships
- Baseball - 1 State Championship
- Boys Hockey - 2 State Championships
- eSports: Minecraft Bedwars - 1 Runner-Up
- eSports: Chess - 1 Championship, 1 3rd Place

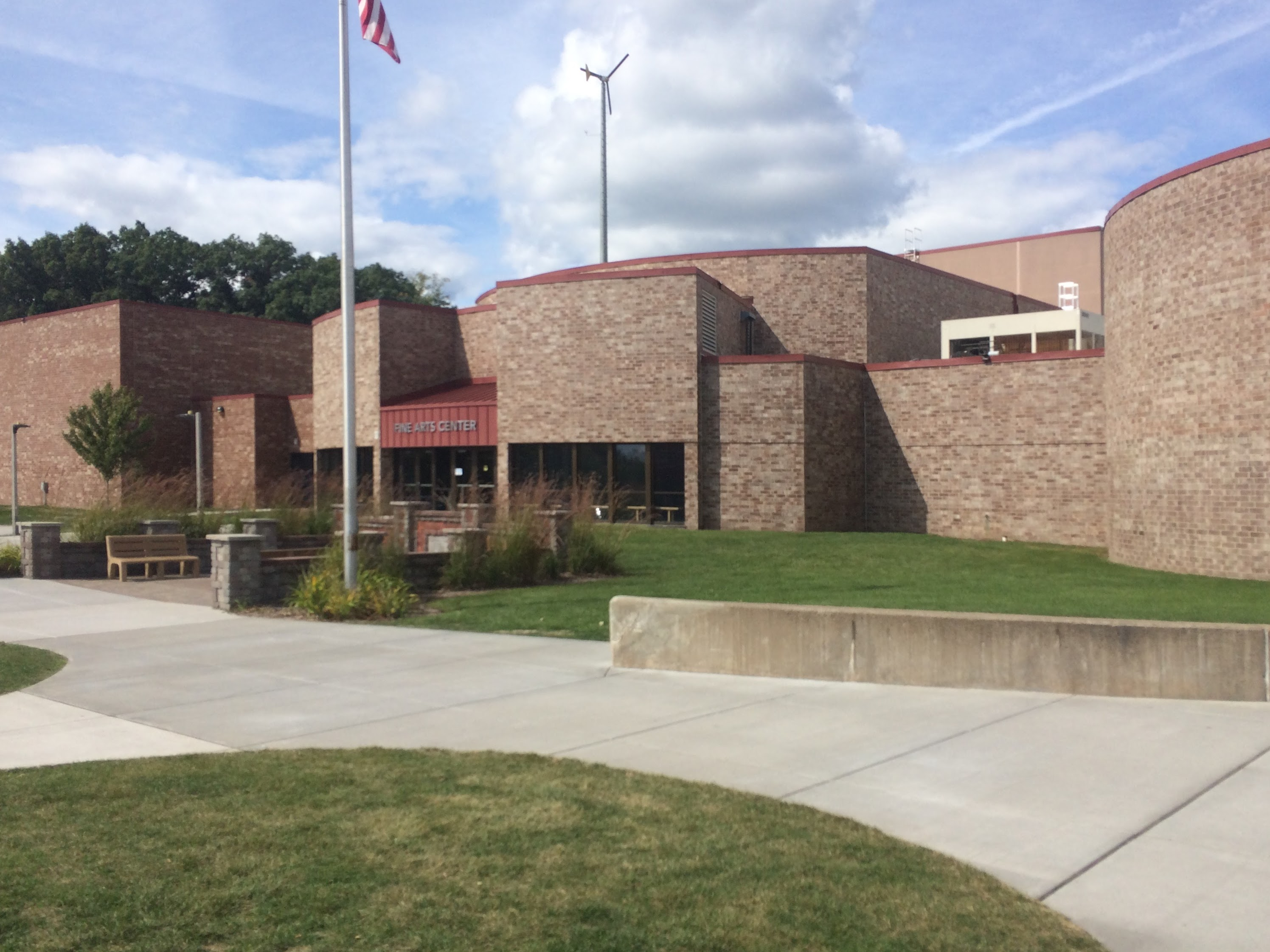
The Chautauqua Fine Arts Center where many MHS groups perform. including the band, choir and drama

== Notable alumni ==
- Mike Baumann (born 1995), professional baseball player (San Francisco Giants)
- Sean Hjelle (born 1997), professional baseball player (San Francisco Giants)
- Nick Monroe, college football coach for the Minnesota Golden Gophers
- Nuni Omot, professional basketball player (Israeli Basketball Premier League) and Olympian
- Justin Pierre (born 1976), lead singer (Motion City Soundtrack)
