= Kris Lindahl =

American real estate broker and author

- Born: 1982 or 1983; Minnesota, U.S.
- Education: Minnesota State University, Mankato
- Occupations: Real estate broker; business owner; author
- Years active: 2009–present
- Organization: Kris Lindahl Real Estate
- Known for: "Arms out" billboard advertising campaign
- Children: 1
- Website: krislindahl.com

Kris Lindahl (born 1982 or 1983) is an American real estate broker, business owner, and author from Minnesota. He founded Kris Lindahl Real Estate in 2018 after working for RE/MAX. Lindahl became known in Minnesota for a high-visibility advertising campaign featuring billboards, bus ads and other outdoor advertising with his arms outstretched and slogans including "Guaranteed Offer" and "Guaranteed Cash Offer." The campaign has received public criticism and parody and generated memes, imitations, and trademark-related media coverage. In 2025, Lindahl published the memoir Arms Out.

== Early life ==
Lindahl was born in 1982 or 1983 and grew up in Minnesota. He attended Fridley High School and later studied education at Minnesota State University, Mankato. While in college, he sold spring-break vacation packages to other students, an early sales experience later discussed in profiles of his business career.

== Career ==
=== Early career ===
After graduating from college and attending a seminar on short sales, Lindahl entered the real estate market in 2009, during the period following the 2008 subprime mortgage crisis. He sold 147 homes in 2013 and 175 homes in 2014, which was described as the highest individual-agent total in Minnesota for those years. He worked for RE/MAX where he started as an individual agent in 2014 and formed the Kris Lindahl Team in 2015. By 2017, the Kris Lindahl Team had grown to about 30 agents and sold 800 houses.

In 2018, Lindahl left RE/MAX and launched Kris Lindahl Real Estate. In 2019, the Minneapolis/St. Paul Business Journal named him to its 40 Under 40 list, and in 2022 ranked Kris Lindahl Real Estate fifth nationally among mega agent teams by transaction sides.

=== Advertising ===
In 2017, Lindahl began an unconventional advertising campaign in which his name and photo were shown much larger than the name of his agency, starting with 100 billboards and bus ads. He posed in various ways for the first few, then settled on having his arms stretched outwards across the whole billboard. By 2020, his hallmark pose with accompanying text "Guaranteed Offer" was on hundreds of billboards across the state, and it was estimated that Lindahl was spending $2 million annually on billboards.

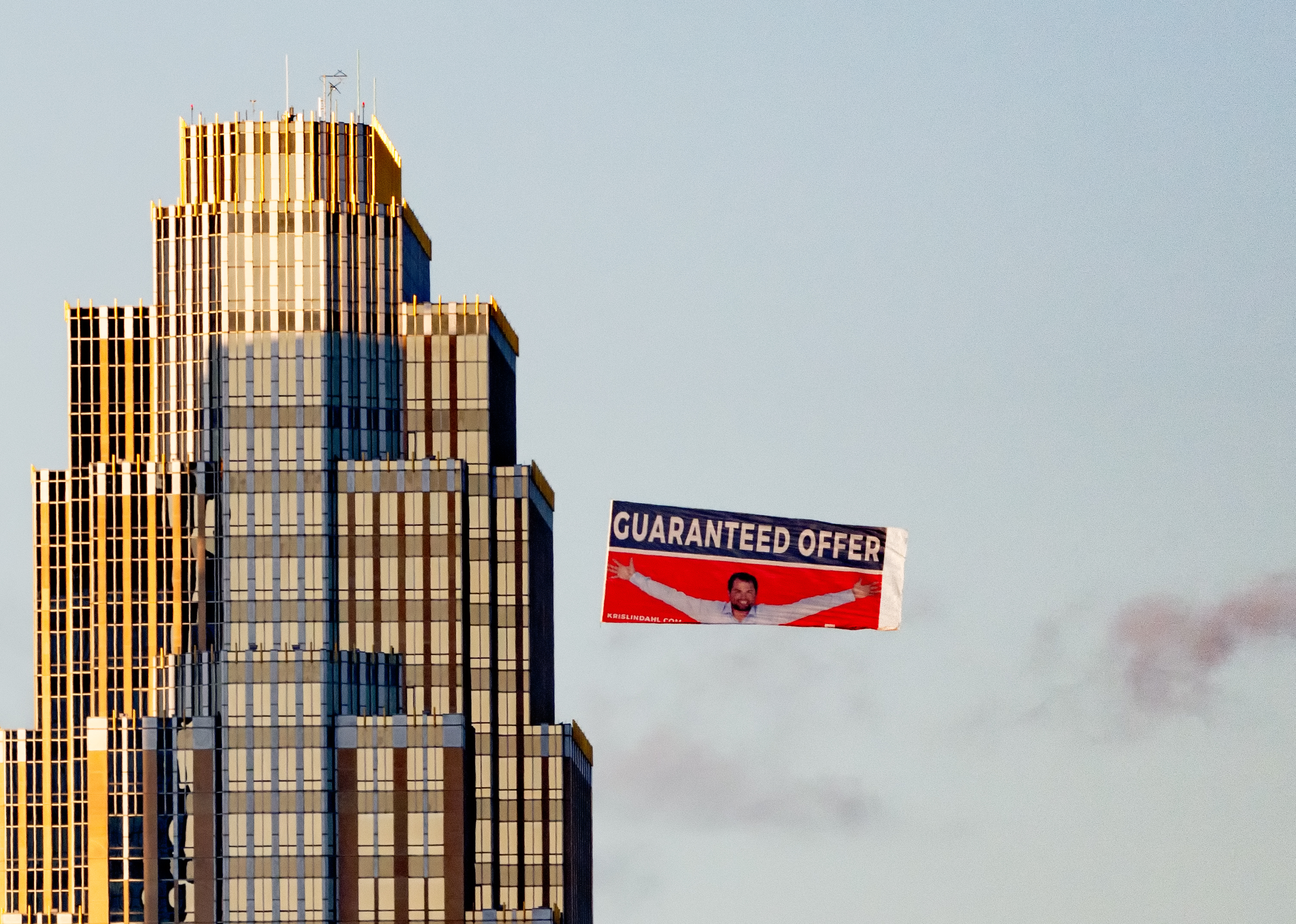
A Kris Lindahl aerial advertising billboard flying behind the Wells Fargo Center in Minneapolis

The Minnesota public's reaction to the billboards has included anger, mockery, and annoyance, but they have also attracted a fandom. The pose has been imitated in Halloween costumes and made into memes.

In 2018, Lindahl used his billboard inventory to bring back a billboard featuring Minnesota Lynx player Maya Moore in White Bear Lake.

In 2019, a 24-year-old Minneapolis man, Derek Camitsch, created a GoFundMe with the objective of creating a parody billboard with a photo of himself captioned "Look how long my arms are". He raised $1,010, and the billboard was placed at East Hennepin Ave and SE 9th Street in Minneapolis. In response, Lindahl donated $1,250 to a local charity for the unhoused.

Lindahl filed for trademark protection on the "Lindahl stretch" arms-out pose in 2022. In August 2022, shortly after that filing, he sued a Canadian realtor associated with RE/MAX, alleging that his advertisements imitated Lindahl's. The realtor had attended a speech by Lindahl on marketing, and a prerequisite for attending the speech was not using any of Lindahl's concepts or intellectual property. The lawsuit was dismissed without prejudice in March 2023, and Lindahl expressed an intention to re-file.

In 2023, Lindahl purchased dozens of billboards throughout Houston during the 2023 American League Division Series between the Minnesota Twins and Houston Astros, some calling out Houston celebrity Jim "Mattress Mack" McIngvale, stating "Hey Mattress Mack. You've never seen Twins like this! Love, Kris Lindahl". McIngvale responded by purchasing billboards in Minnesota stating "My Wife Is A Real Twin, Go Astros! -Mattress Mack".

Activision partnered with Lindahl in 2024 to create a parody of his own billboards for their campaign promoting Call of Duty: Black Ops 6. The billboards, which were shown throughout the Twin Cities, showed the Call of Duty character the Replacer in place of Lindahl, and "Guaranteed Black Ops" instead of "Guaranteed Cash Offer".

=== Other ventures ===
In 2016, the Kris Lindahl Team set a Guinness World Records title for the longest line of pumpkins at an event in Blaine, Minnesota. Guinness World Records reported that the line consisted of 8,672 pumpkins and measured 1.46 kilometers.

In 2025, he published Arms Out, a memoir that discusses his childhood, business career, and public persona.

== Personal life ==
In March 1998, Lindahl's father, John, was run over and killed by the father's fiancée. When tested later, she had a 0.22% blood-alcohol content. She pleaded guilty to criminal vehicular operation in November 1998, and received a six year prison sentence.

Lindahl has a daughter with his ex-wife.

== Selected works ==
- Sold!: Expert Advice on How To Pocket More Money On Your Home Sale. 2017.
- Arms Out. 2025.

== See also ==
- Alexander Shunnarah
