= Michael W. Wright =

American businessman (1938–2020)

Mike Wright
Profile
- Position: Tackle

Personal information
- Born: June 13, 1938; Minneapolis, Minnesota, U.S.
- Died: January 27, 2020 (aged 81); Wayzata, Minnesota, U.S.
- Listed height: 6 ft 3 in (1.91 m)
- Listed weight: 235 lb (107 kg)

Career information
- NFL draft: 1960: 6th round, 65th overall pick

Career history
- 1960–1961: Winnipeg Blue Bombers

Awards and highlights
- Grey Cup champion (1961)

Michael William Wright (June 13, 1938 – January 27, 2020) was an American business executive and Canadian football player. He was chief executive officer of SuperValu (1981–2001) and a director of Wells Fargo & Company.

He was educated at Saint Mark's Catholic (elementary) School, St. Thomas Academy and later attended the University of Minnesota, receiving a BA degree and later, in 1963, a JD degree. He also played football at the University of Minnesota and in the Canadian Football League for the Winnipeg Blue Bombers, winning the Grey Cup in 1961. After practicing law with the firm of Dorsey & Whitney in Minneapolis, Wright joined SuperValu, Inc., in March 1977 as senior vice president for administration. In 1978 Wright was named chief operating officer and president.

Wright was president of SuperValu until 2001, concurrently as chief executive officer from 1981 and chairman from 1982. A recipient of the 1999 Horatio Alger Award, he also was chairman of the Federal Reserve Bank of Minneapolis. He retired as president and CEO of SuperValu in June 2001 and as chairman in June 2002.

Elected a director of Norwest Corporation in 1991, he was on the bank's board until its merger in 1998 with Wells Fargo, whereupon he became a director of Wells Fargo.

Politically, he was a member of George W. Bush for President and of the National Republican Congressional Committee.

Wright was a member of the boards of Wells Fargo & Company, Canadian Pacific Railway, Cargill, Inc., S.C. Johnson & Son, and Honeywell International, Inc. He is also a trustee of St. Thomas Academy, a former member of the University of Minnesota Law School Board of Visitors (1999–2004), and trustee emeritus of the University of Minnesota Foundation. He died on January 27, 2020.
