= Visitation School =

Location
- 2455 Visitation Drive; Mendota Heights, Minnesota; Mendota Heights, (Dakota County), Minnesota 55120-1696; United States; 44°52′7″N 93°7′57″W

Information
- School type: Private Private, Catholic, All-Girls
- Motto: Non Scholae Sed Vitae (Not for School, but for Life)
- Religious affiliation: Roman Catholic (Visitation Sisters)
- Established: September 8, 1873
- Founder: St. Jane De Chantal, St. Francis De Sales
- Dean: Ann Feitl
- Head of school: Rene Gavic
- Grades: PK–12
- Gender: Coeducational (PK-5); Girls (6-12)
- Colors: Red and White
- Song: Affirmation
- Fight song: Rock with the Red, Roll with the White
- Athletics conference: Tri-Metro
- Mascot: Blaze
- Nickname: Vis
- Team name: Blazers
- Accreditation: NCA
- Newspaper: Visitation Voice
- Yearbook: The Record
- Website: visitation.net

Visitation School, also known as Visitation or Vis, is an independent, all-girls, Roman Catholic, college-preparatory, school in Minnesota. It is located in Mendota Heights near Saint Paul. Visitation is a coeducational school for grades Montessori PreK-grade 5, and all-girls for grades 6–12. Visitation is the only all-girls secondary school in Minnesota.

A brother school, Saint Thomas Academy, is located across the street and many classes and after school activities involve both schools. Depending on the sport or activity, some of its rival schools are Cretin-Derham Hall, Breck School, St. Paul Academy and Summit School, and The Blake School.

== History ==
Visitation was founded by Sisters of the Visitation in 1873, who traveled up the Mississippi River from St. Louis, Missouri at the request of some prominent businessmen in St. Paul who wished for a strong, Catholic education for their daughters. This may have been P. F. McQuillan, whose three daughters attended the school. It was founded in St. Paul, and later moved to its current location. The current location of the school in Mendota Heights, MN, is the school's fourth location. Several peacocks have historically resided at the Mendota Heights campus.

The Order of the Visitation of Holy Mary was founded in France in 1610. The founders of the order are St. Francis de Sales and St. Jane de Chantal from whom the order gained its Salesian spirituality.

There are sister school locations in St. Louis, MO and Washington, D.C., as well as monasteries in other areas throughout the U.S. The school is coeducational from preschool through grade 5, but becomes single-gender in sixth grade. Prior to the 2017–18 school year, it was co-ed from preschool to sixth grade, and all-girls from seventh grade onwards. To coincide with this change, Saint Thomas Academy added its inaugural (all-boys) sixth grade. Visitation is the only all-girls Catholic secondary school in Minnesota.

The first graduating class at Visitation had only four members; the class of 2019 is made up of 77 young women.

== Athletics ==
Visitation offers 13 varsity sports:

- Softball
- Track & Field
- Lacrosse
- Golf
- Swimming and Diving
- Basketball
- Ice Hockey
- Nordic Skiing
- Alpine Skiing
- Volleyball
- Soccer
- Tennis
- Cross Country

== VISTA Productions ==
VISTA Productions is the combined theater troupe of The Convent of the Visitation School and Saint Thomas Academy. They put on three main productions a year, including a fall drama, a winter dance piece/improv show and a spring musical. VISTA Productions also is a participant in the Spotlight Program, a High School Theater Recognition Program sponsored by the Hennepin Theater Trust. In the spring of 2014, VISTA Productions received ten awards from this program including the award for Outstanding Overall Production of a Musical for their production of Shrek the Musical. The next year, their production of "The Drowsy Chaperone" also received numerous awards from Spotlight, once again including "Outstanding Overall Production of a Musical" and "Outstanding Overall Performance of a Musical."
