= Brooklyn Center High School =

Coordinates: 45.0736609°N 93.2977882°W

Brooklyn Center Jr./Sr. High School

Location
- 6500 Humboldt Ave N Brooklyn Center, Minnesota 55430; United States of America

Information
- Type: Public
- Motto: "Expect The Best"
- Established: 1961
- Principal: Arslan Aziz
- Teaching staff: 31.28 (FTE)
- Grades: 9-12
- Enrollment: 516 (2023-2024)
- Student to teacher ratio: 16.50
- Athletics conference: Tri-Metro
- Mascot: Centaur
- Colors: Purple and White
- Website: https://bcs.bccs286.org/

Brooklyn Center High School is a public high school located in Brooklyn Center, Minnesota.

== School overview ==
Brooklyn Center High School is the only high school serving ISD #286, and has approximately 850 students in grades 6–12. One of the highest in the state, BCHS' open enrollment percentage is 33%. District 286 is the smallest district in the state of Minnesota in terms of geographical size. Family is the main goal and strategy at this school. Its athletics teams compete in the Tri-Metro Conference. It was previously a founding member of the Metro Alliance. In 1982 Brooklyn Center won the inaugural Minnesota State Class A football championship. The school also participates in the University of Minnesota's College in the Schools program.

== Notable alumni ==
- Marcus Harris, Fred Biletnikoff award winner as a receiver at University of Wyoming
- Justin “Judd” Jennrich, BCW Wrestling Promoter and former TCW World Champion BCW and TCW

John Hartinger served in the Minnesota House of Representatives in 1985 and 1986 and was a Republican.[1]

References[edit] ^ Minnesota Legislators: Past & Present-John M. Hartinger
