= Joseph T. O'Neill =

American politician and lawyer (1931–2022)

Joseph Thomas O'Neill
- Born: November 11, 1931; Saint Paul, Minnesota, U.S.
- Died: January 25, 2022 (aged 90)
- Education: University of Notre Dame (B.A.)
- Alma mater: University of Minnesota Law School (J.D.)
- Occupations: Politician, Lawyer
- Political party: Republican

Joseph Thomas O'Neill (November 11, 1931 – January 25, 2022) was an American politician and lawyer.

O'Neill was born in Saint Paul, Minnesota, on November 11, 1931. He graduated from Saint Thomas Academy, in Mendota Heights, Minnesota, in 1949. He received his bachelor's degree from the University of Notre Dame in 1953 and his Juris Doctor degree from the University of Minnesota Law School in 1956. He served in the United States Air Force, from 1956 to 1959, as a junior advocate officer and was commissioned a first lieutenant. O'Neill practiced law in Saint Paul, Minnesota. O'Neill served in the Minnesota House of Representatives from 1967 to 1971 and in the Minnesota Senate from 1971 to 1977. O'Neill was a Republican. O'Neill died on January 25, 2022, at the age of 90.
