= St. Anthony Village High School =

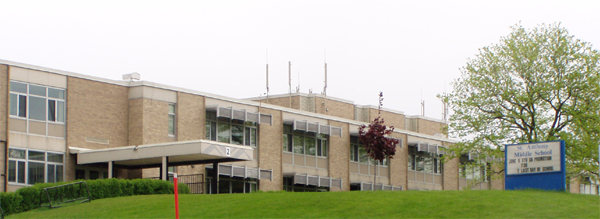

Location
- 3303 33rd Avenue NE; St. Anthony, Minnesota 55418-9971; United States; 45°1′42″N 93°12′52″W

Information
- Type: Public
- Established: 1964
- Principal: Dr. Joel Leer
- Staff: 39.72 (on an FTE basis)
- Grades: 9–12
- Enrollment: 754 (2024–2025)
- Student to teacher ratio: 18.93
- Colors: Royal Blue and White
- Athletics conference: Tri-Metro
- Mascot: Huskies
- Website: savhs.isd282.org

St. Anthony Village High School (SAVHS) is a public high school located in St. Anthony Village, a suburb of Minneapolis, Minnesota, United States.

== School overview ==
According to US News, St. Anthony Village High School ranks 39th among high schools in Minnesota. Students have the opportunity to take Advanced Placement® coursework and exams.

The AP® participation rate at St. Anthony Village High School is 76 percent. The student body makeup is 51 percent male and 49 percent female, and the total minority enrollment is 41 percent. Additionally, 32 percent of students at St. Anthony are economically disadvantaged. St. Anthony Village High School is the only high school serving ISD #282, and it has an approximate enrollment of 750. The district offers an open enrollment option that allows students who live outside its boundaries to attend St. Anthony Village High School.

The school shares facilities with St. Anthony Village Middle School. The elementary school for the district is Wilshire Park Elementary. Additionally, St. Charles Borromeo offers private school education for grades K-8. At just 2.6 square miles, the school district is geographically the smallest in the state of Minnesota.

== Academics ==
US News ranked the school #2580 in their 2025-2026 national rankings. The student:teacher ratio at St. Anthony High School is 20:1. Additionally, St. Anthony is a participant in the University of Minnesota's College in the Schools (CIS) program. Its academic teams also perform well; St. Anthony won the 2004, 2006, 2007, 2010, and 2011 AA knowledge bowl competitions and the 2005 Minnesota Science Bowl competition.

== Athletics and activities ==
St. Anthony’s team mascot is the Huskie, and the school colors are royal blue and white. The team won the 2006 and 2008 State AA baseball championships. Baseball games are played at Palm Field and football games at Denison Field. The St Anthony Huskies won the 4AAAA section championship and proceeded to the Minnesota state football championships in 2018.

The St. Anthony's RoboHuskie team has participated in the FIRST Robotics Competition program since the 2007-2008 season. They earned the Highest Seeded Rookie award at the Milwaukee Regional in 2008. RoboHuskie earned the 2nd seed during the 2009 10,000 Lakes Regional. In 2010, they won the Wisconsin regional competition and went to Atlanta, Georgia, for the FIRST Championship.

St. Anthony recently rejoined the Tri-Metro Conference. Previously, it had competed in the Metro Alliance after leaving the Tri-Metro in 1997, returning after the latter disbanded in 2005. They compete in most sports at the 2A level.

The school is not large enough to support all sports on its own, so boys’ and girls' hockey is concurrent with Irondale High School, and co-ed Nordic skiing, wrestling, and co-ed track are joint-teams with Spring Lake Park High School.

St. Anthony Village High School and Columbia Heights High School have a long-standing athletic rivalry, with both schools competing in the Tri-Metro Conference. In football, St. Anthony recorded decisive victories over Columbia Heights, including 41–0 in 2024 and 76–7 in 2025. Basketball matchups have been closer, such as an 83–82 St. Anthony victory in January 2026.

== Notable alumni ==
- Phil Carruthers, former Minnesota State Representative for District 47B, served as the 55th Speaker of the Minnesota House of Representatives
- Dr. Joseph R. Pawlik, Frank Hawkins Kenan Distinguished Professor of Marine Biology at UNCW
