= Silver Lake Village =

- Location: Saint Anthony, Minnesota
- Coordinates: 45°02′20″N 93°13′16″W
- Address: 3800 Silver Lake Road, St. Anthony, MN
- Opened: 1961
- Closed: 2004 (demolished April 2004)
- Developer: Apache Corporation
- Owner: Stierling Organization
- Architect: Willard Thorsen
- Num. of stores: over 60
- Num. of anchor tenants: 1
- Floor area: 530,800 square feet (49,310 m^{2}) (Apache Plaza); 166,812 square feet (15,497.3 m^{2}) (Silver Lake)
- Public transit: Metro Transit
- Website: Apache Plaza tribute page on Facebook

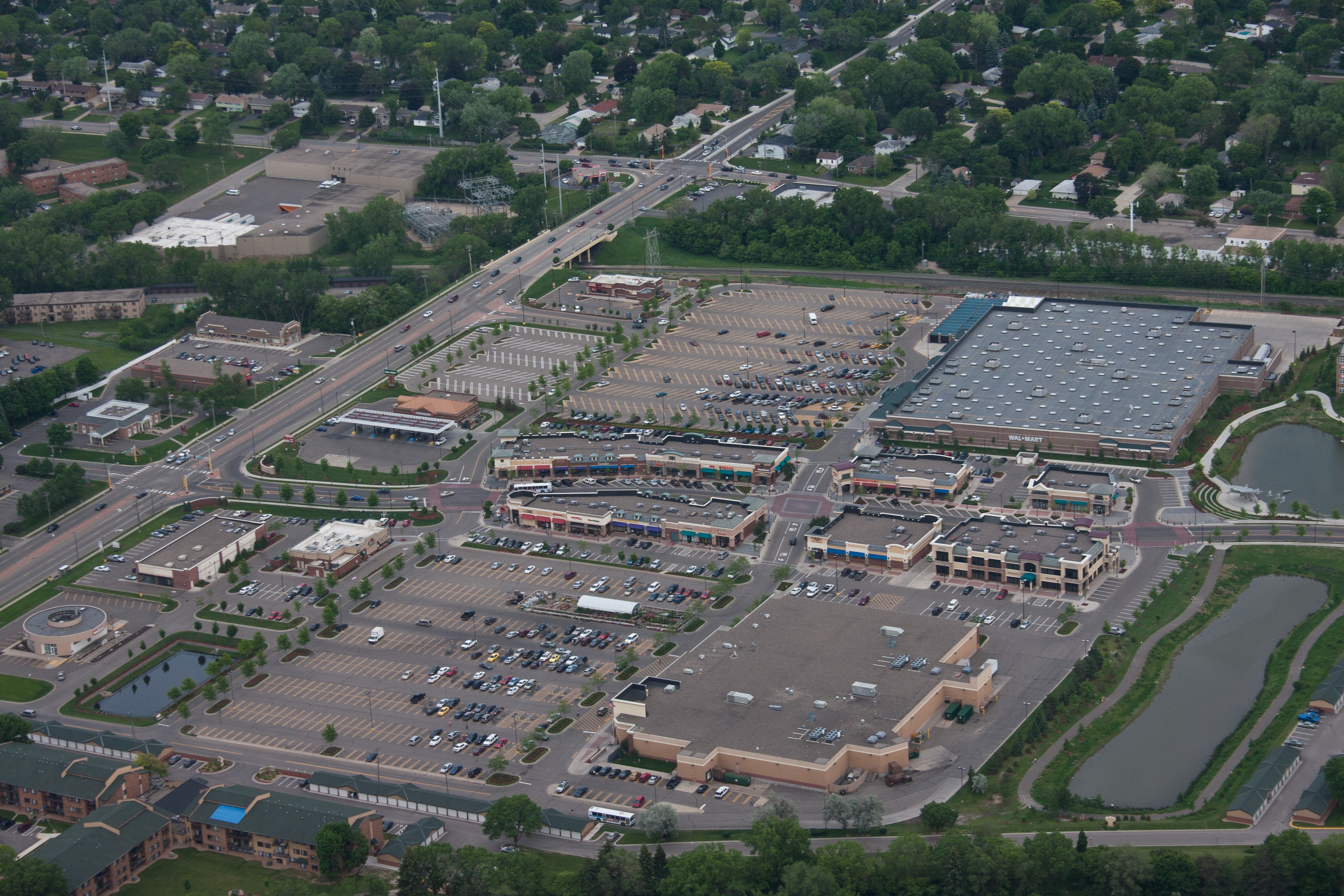
Aerial view of Silver Lake Village

Silver Lake Village is a mixed-use development in the city of St. Anthony, Minnesota, United States. It was constructed beginning in 2004 as a $150 million plan to replace Apache Plaza, an aging enclosed mall. Its design is meant to resemble a "walkable community", as its development includes housing, shopping, dining, and other services. Its name is derived from Silver Lake, located just north of the development, and from St. Anthony's nickname of "St. Anthony Village".

Silver Lake Village is located along Silver Lake Road, north of 37th Ave NE. It is served by Metro Transit routes 4, 25, and 801.

== History ==
Apache Plaza has historic significance because it was one of the first enclosed malls in the US, opening in 1961. It was the second such center in the state of Minnesota, after Southdale. Its design, by architect Willard Thorsen, was state-of-the-art at the time. Apache had a spacious center court with a hyperbolic paraboloid roof (hyperboloid structure). The paraboloids were concrete shells, shaped like an inverted umbrella. Ten of these paraboloids made up the roof of the center court, which was ringed with Mondrian-inspired clerestory windows. The mall had more than 60 stores at its height, as well as a large monthly indoor antiques and collectables show and a bowling alley in the basement. In the early 1970s, the mall was still thriving, despite the opening of nearby Rosedale. The larger mall would contribute to the Apache's decline, with the relocation of the Apache's anchor stores to Rosedale.

== The decline of Apache ==
In the early 1980s, Apache underwent a major renovation, only to have its south end damaged by a tornado on 26 April 1984. Three days after the tornado, a major snowfall covered the area. Since it was spring, the snow quickly melted, flooding twister-damaged areas of the mall. The damage was repaired, and the mall re-opened on 15 November. Some of the original charm was lost, as the multi-colored clerestory windows around the center court were replaced with colorless glass.

In the early 1990s, tenants began leaving the mall in droves. Herberger's opened at Apache in 1987, saving the center from demolition for 17 years. By 2000, the mall was nearly empty, but still open to mall-walkers. Around this time, Apache Plaza was voted as the "best place to dump someone" in the Twin Cities by the local alternative weekly City Pages.

Apache was scheduled for demolition in April 2004. The final days saw the mall host a "Bulldozer Bash." This was intended to kick off plans for its successor development, Silver Lake Village, a mixed-use development. However, the majority of the people at the event were not there to celebrate the new shopping center, but came to share Apache memories and mourn the loss of what was once the center of their community.

== Housing ==
Silver Lake Village has a number of choices, including traditional apartments, condominiums, and cottage-style homes. Most of this housing is new construction since 2004, but some properties, such as the Equinox Apartments, were constructed in the 1970s in the era of the Apache Plaza.

In March 2020, The Doran Group began a project of revitalizing the site of a vacant Walmart located within the complex. The project, named The Ruby Apartments, had construction continue into October 2022, when the first leases and purchases were made. The Ruby has 496 rooms, and brings a modern and urban feel to the complex.

== Shopping ==
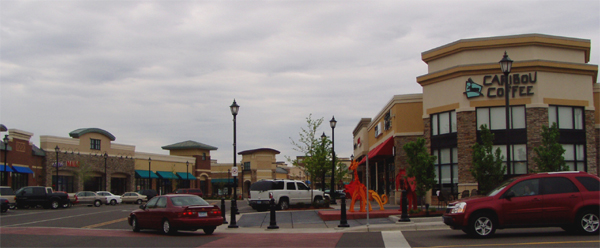
Silver Lake Village, 2006

The center is anchored by Cub Foods supermarket at the north. There are smaller buildings with other stores found in strip malls, including GameStop, Chipotle, Caribou Coffee, Leeann Chin, and Coldstone Creamery. The multi-use area also contains a gas station, bank, doctors office, and small pond with walking path and amphitheater. The city of St. Anthony operates a liquor store in the complex.

Walmart closed the Silver Lake Village location shortly after the new SuperCenter opened in neighboring Roseville. Demolition of the existing Walmart building occurred in 2020.

== Dining ==
Silver Lake Village is also home to various restaurants. The complex includes Chipotle Mexican Grill, Leeann Chin, and Caribou Coffee. A Culver's is adjacent to the development also. A new restaurant called Steele & Hops opened in 2022 and provides the area with modern and classic dishes, as well as a heated patio for outdoor dining.

== Services ==
Located in the mall are other services, such as a Verizon Wireless retailer, salon, including a number of bank branches and health clinics.

== Entertainment ==
Salo Park, named in honor of St. Anthony's sister-city of Salo, Finland, is located along the eastern edge of the complex, and its amphitheater is home to summer concerts. There are walking paths located near the park as well.
