= St. Anthony, Minnesota =

City in Minnesota, United States

St. Anthony, Minnesota Saint Anthony Village
- City
- City of St. Anthony Village
- Logo
- Nickname: The Village
- Motto: "A Village Within the City"
- Location of the city of St. Anthony within Hennepin and Ramsey Counties in the state of Minnesota
- Coordinates: 45°01′40″N 93°13′03″W
- Country: United States
- State: Minnesota
- County: Hennepin, Ramsey
- Established (township): 1861
- Incorporated (village): 1945
- Incorporated (city): 1974

Government
  - Mayor: Wendy Webster

Area
  - Total: 2.36 sq mi (6.10 km^{2})
  - Land: 2.24 sq mi (5.79 km^{2})
  - Water: 0.12 sq mi (0.30 km^{2})
- Elevation: 997 ft (304 m)

Population (2020)
  - Total: 9,257
  - Estimate (2022): 10,124
  - Density: 4,140.3/sq mi (1,598.58/km^{2})
- Time zone: UTC-6 (Central)
  - Summer (DST): UTC-5 (CDT)
- ZIP codes: 55418, 55421
- Area codes: 612, 651
- FIPS code: 27-56680
- GNIS feature ID: 2396471
- Website: www.savmn.com

St. Anthony, also known as Saint Anthony Village, is a city in Hennepin and Ramsey counties in the U.S. state of Minnesota. The population was 9,257 at the 2020 census, of whom 5,621 lived in the larger Hennepin County part of the city and 3,654 in the Ramsey County part. The city is run by a five-member council consisting of a mayor and four council members who serve four-year terms.

== History ==
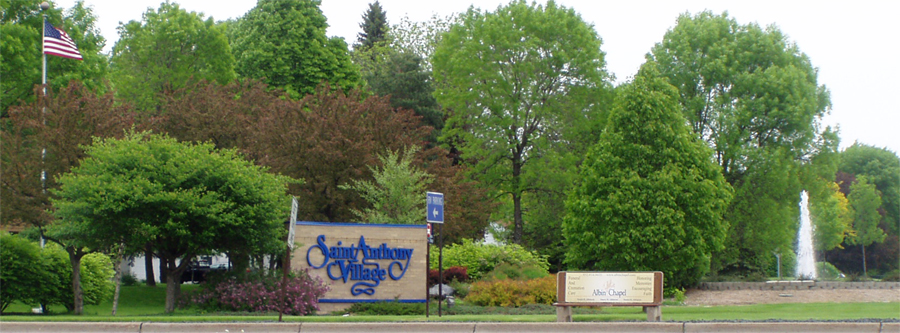
Signage to the city

St. Anthony's origins date to 1838, when Franklin Steele, a storekeeper at Fort Snelling, made a claim on the land east of St. Anthony Falls. Steele did not begin developing the land until 1848, but it quickly became a center of milling and trade much like the neighboring town of Minneapolis on the land west of the falls. In 1858 the town was formally organized as the Township of St. Anthony.

In 1872, Minneapolis annexed most of St. Anthony (much of present-day Northeast and Southeast Minneapolis). Roughly 1,000 acres (400 ha) of mostly agricultural land north of the city retained the name St. Anthony but remained unincorporated. In 1945, the township's residents voted 167–57 in favor of incorporating as a village. The state challenged this decision on the basis that St. Anthony was too agricultural and rural, but it was upheld by the Minnesota Supreme Court. As the city's suburbs grew outward, St. Anthony evolved from a rural township to an inner suburb.

St. Anthony was the home of Apache Plaza, the tenth indoor shopping mall in United States, which opened in October 1961 and was demolished in 2004. It has been replaced by a new shopping area, Silver Lake Village. The oldest, Southdale, lay only 15 miles (24 km) to the southwest and was completed in October 1956. Built in the 1950s, the St. Anthony Shopping Center was Minnesota's first strip mall and was owned by the Batista family of Cuba.

In the spring of 2006, the St. Anthony Village High School Huskies claimed ISD 282's first state baseball championship. The Huskies won the championship again in 2008. The school has also won five Class AA state championships in Knowledge Bowl and has won one Minnesota Science Bowl competition.

== Geography ==
St. Anthony is 4 miles (6 km) northeast of downtown Minneapolis. According to the United States Census Bureau, the city has a total area of 2.37 square miles (6.14 km^{2}), of which 2.25 square miles (5.83 km^{2}) is land and 0.12 square miles (0.31 km^{2}) is water.

One of St. Anthony's longest and most widely used streets is Silver Lake Road. Named for Silver Lake in the northwest part of the city, it runs the length of St. Anthony from north to south. County Highway 88 is another of the city's main routes. Interstate 35W skims through the south near the St. Anthony Boulevard exit.

== Demographics ==
Historical population
Census	Pop.	Note	%±
1850	656		—
1860	265		−59.6%
1870	236		−10.9%
1880	485		105.5%
1890	92		−81.0%
1900	93		1.1%
1910	100		7.5%
1920	134		34.0%
1930	455		239.6%
1940	607		33.4%
1950	1,406		131.6%
1960	5,084		261.6%
1970	9,239		81.7%
1980	7,981		−13.6%
1990	7,727		−3.2%
2000	8,012		3.7%
2010	8,226		2.7%
2020	9,257		12.5%
2022 (est.)	10,124		9.4%
U.S. Decennial Census; 2020 Census

=== 2010 census ===
As of the census of 2010, there were 8,226 people, 3,848 households, and 2,054 families residing in the city. The population density was 3,656.0 inhabitants per square mile (1,411.6/km^{2}). There were 4,098 housing units at an average density of 1,821.3 per square mile (703.2/km^{2}). The racial makeup of the city was

- 85.1% White,
- 5.0% African American,
- 0.6% Native American,
- 5.9% Asian,
- 0.1% Pacific Islander,

1.0% from other races, and 2.3% from two or more races.

- Hispanic or Latino of any race were 2.9% of the population.

There were 3,848 households, of which 21.5% had children under the age of 18 living with them, 42.5% were married couples living together, 7.7% had a female householder with no husband present, 3.2% had a male householder with no wife present, and 46.6% were non-families. 39.3% of all households were made up of individuals, and 19.2% had someone living alone who was 65 years of age or older. The average household size was 2.11 and the average family size was 2.83.

The median age in the city was 43.1 years. 17.5% of residents were under the age of 18; 8.5% were between the ages of 18 and 24; 26.1% were from 25 to 44; 26.4% were from 45 to 64; and 21.4% were 65 years of age or older. The gender makeup of the city was 46.1% male and 53.9% female.

=== 2000 census ===
As of the census of 2000, there were 8,012 people, 3,697 households, and 2,007 families residing in the city. The population density was 3,513.8 inhabitants per square mile (1,356.7/km^{2}). There were 3,812 housing units at an average density of 1,671.8 per square mile (645.5/km^{2}). The racial makeup of the city was 90.58% White, 2.06% African American, 0.64% Native American, 4.51% Asian, 0.02% Pacific Islander, 0.79% from other races, and 1.41% from two or more races. Hispanic or Latino of any race were 1.65% of the population. 20.5% were of German, 12.6% Norwegian, 10.5% Swedish, 8.7% Polish and 6.3% Irish ancestry.

There were 3,697 households, out of which 20.0% had children under the age of 18 living with them, 44.7% were married couples living together, 7.0% had a female householder with no husband present, and 45.7% were non-families. 38.2% of all households were made up of individuals, and 18.5% had someone living alone who was 65 years of age or older. The average household size was 2.11 and the average family size was 2.83.

In the city, the population was spread out, with 18.0% under the age of 18, 8.9% from 18 to 24, 26.2% from 25 to 44, 21.9% from 45 to 64, and 25.1% who were 65 years of age or older. The median age was 43 years. For every 100 females, there were 85.2 males. For every 100 females age 18 and over, there were 79.5 males.

The median income for a household in the city was $46,883, and the median income for a family was $62,500. Males had a median income of $43,043 versus $31,304 for females. The per capita income for the city was $26,290. About 2.8% of families and 5.1% of the population were below the poverty line, including 5.0% of those under age 18 and 3.0% of those age 65 or over.

== Education ==
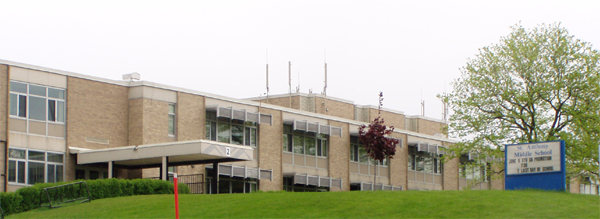
St. Anthony Middle/High School

St. Anthony is served by the St. Anthony-New Brighton School District, ISD 282. Wilshire Park Elementary School is the district's primary school. St. Anthony Middle School serves grades 6–8. St. Anthony Village High School serves grades 9–12. St. Charles Borromeo offers private education for grades K–8.

== Parks and recreation ==
St. Anthony has several city parks. The most notable is Central Park, in the center of the city near the High School and Community Center, as well as the police station, fire station and water treatment plant. Several of the high school's athletic teams host home competitions in Central Park. Smaller parks include Emerald Park, Silver Point Park, and Trillium Park. St. Anthony also has a golf course maintained by the Minneapolis Parks and Recreation Board and a county park, Silverwood, maintained by the Three Rivers Park District. Silverwood Park is on Silver Lake, which is almost entirely within St. Anthony's boundaries.

== Sister city ==
St. Anthony Village has one sister city, as designated by Sister Cities International:

- Salo, Finland

St. Anthony dedicated Salo Park to its sister city on June 8, 2006, in its Silver Lake Village development.

== Notable people ==
- H. Timothy ("Tim") Vakoc, former associate pastor of St. Charles Borromeo Catholic Church in St. Anthony, and the first U.S. military chaplain to die from wounds received in the Iraq War

== Gallery ==
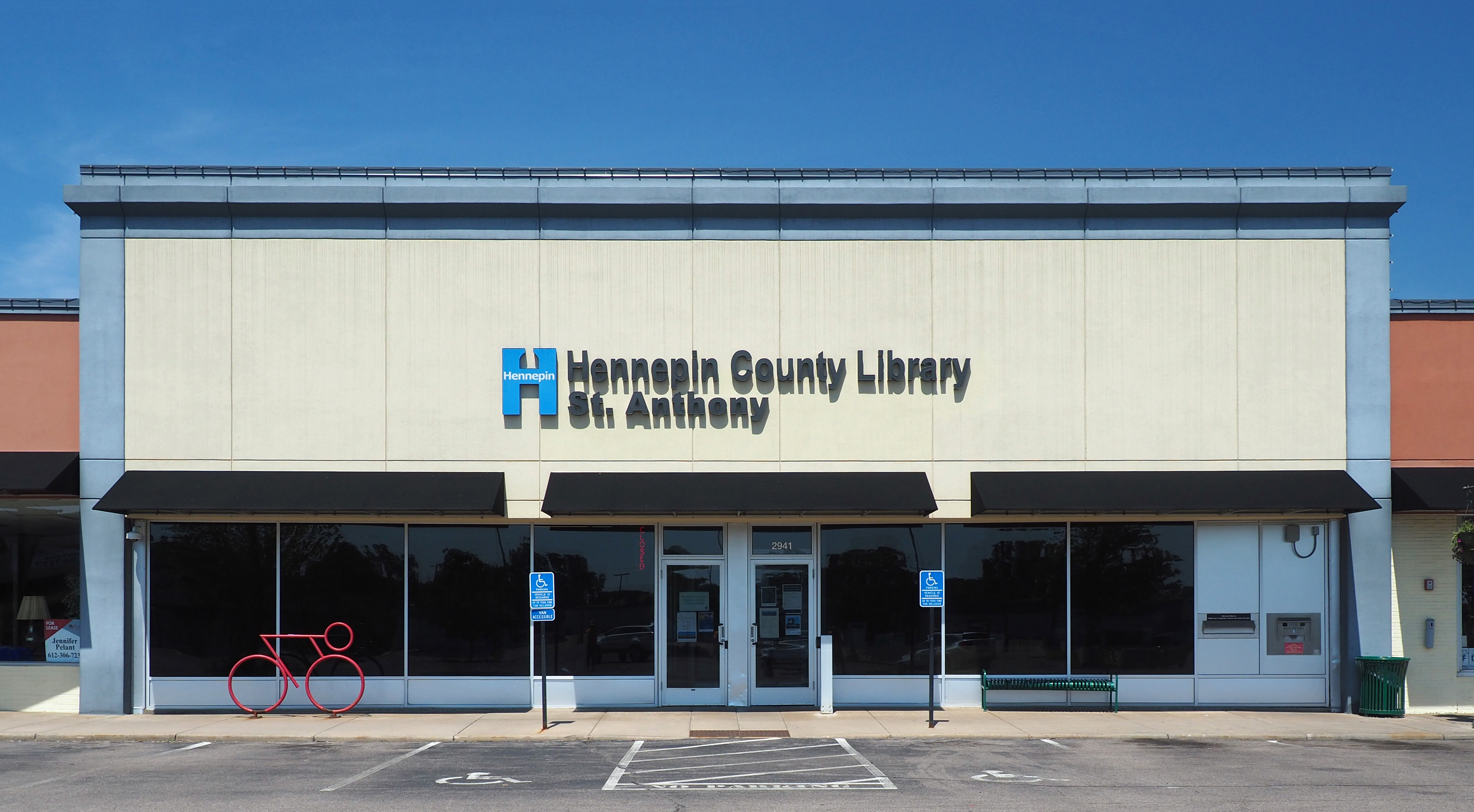
Hennepin County Library's St. Anthony location

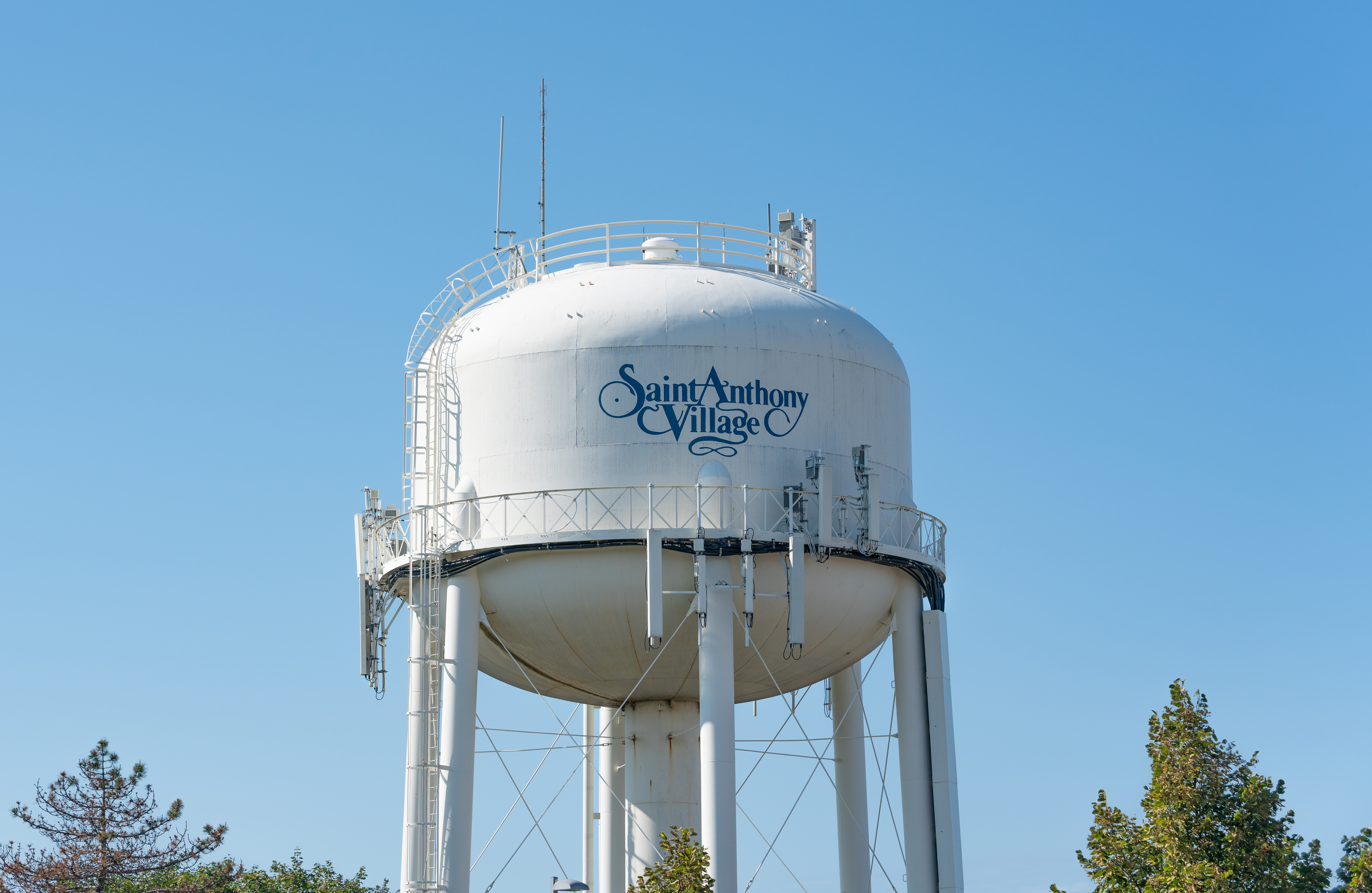
Water tower

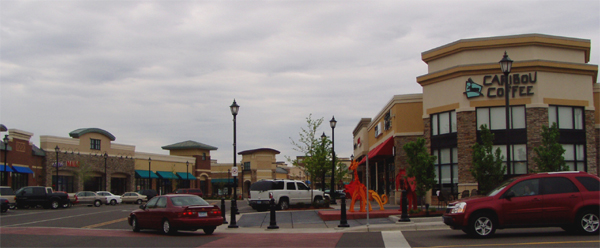
Silver Lake Village shopping area

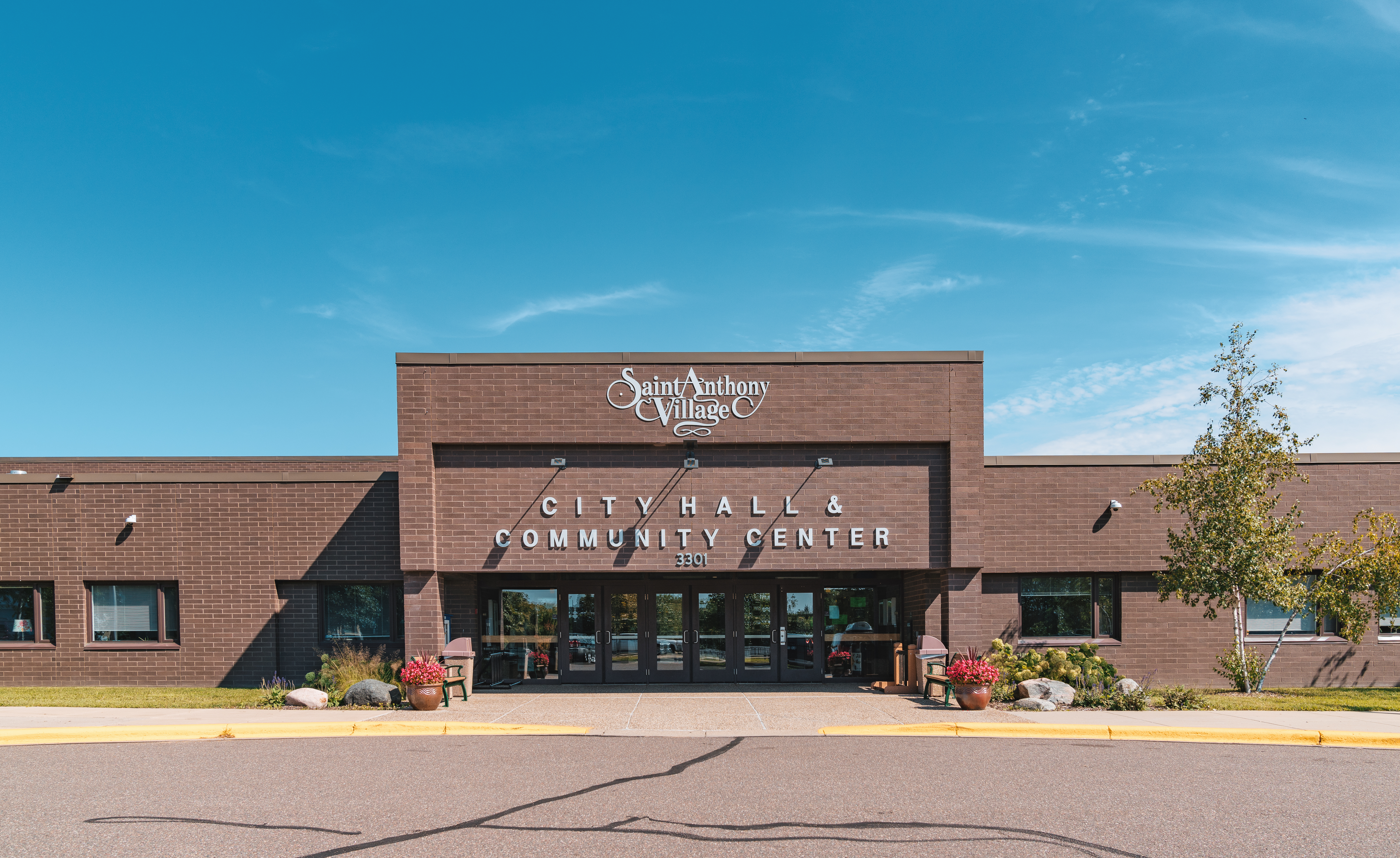
City Hall and Community Center
