= Fridley High School =

Location
- 6000 West Moore Lake Drive, Fridley, Minnesota 55432; Fridley, Minnesota; United States of America; 45.0774°N 93.2549°W

Information
- Type: Public secondary
- School district: Fridley Independent School District 14
- Principal: Cedric Fuller
- Teaching staff: 58.95 (FTE)
- Enrollment: 796 (2024–2025)
- Student to teacher ratio: 13.50
- Athletics conference: Tri-Metro
- Mascot: Tigers
- Rival: Columbia Heights High School
- Colors: Black and Gold
- Website: fhs.fridleyschools.org

Fridley High School is one of the high schools in Fridley, Minnesota. The high school itself is part of Minnesota School District 14, though much of Fridley falls into other districts. The high school shares a street corner with Fridley Middle School. Both facilities operate together and provide mixed curriculum. For instance, the middle school houses the pool and provides "field experience" for seniors thinking about going into education. The high school houses the auditorium which is used by Substance Church and the Fridley Community Theatre as well as the school district.

The school has a full range of courses and activities for students in grades 9 through 12. Fridley High, along with the rest of the schools in District 14, has been certified to offer an International Baccalaureate program.

== School ranking ==
SchoolDigger.com, which ranks schools based on their academic scores, reports that Fridley High School improved scores significantly in 2015 when compared to 2014. The school's rank change improved by 67 positions when compared to other Minnesota high schools.

== Fridley athletics and activities ==
State athletic team championships
Season	Number of championships	Year
Football, boys'	2	1990 and 2020
Wrestling, men's	4	1967, 1973, 1975 and 1979
Track and Field, boys	1	2024
Total		7

== Other nearby schools ==
Totino-Grace High School, a private Catholic high school, Calvin Christian High School, a private Christian high school, and Al-Amal School, a private Islamic K-12 school, are also located in Fridley.

A small portion of the northern part of Fridley lies within the Anoka-Hennepin School District 11. These students go to Coon Rapids High School. Students living in an area of eastern Fridley are in the Columbia Heights School District 13. Most of the students living in the north-northeastern part of the city are in Spring Lake Park School District 16.

== Notable alumni ==
- Kris Lindahl, realtor known for large advertisements featuring images of himself with his arms outstretched
