= St. Anthony-New Brighton School District =

School district in Minnesota, United States

St. Anthony-New Brighton Independent School District 282 (SANBSD/ISD 282), serves the city of St. Anthony Village and portions of New Brighton, Minnesota. The district operates three schools, as well as a community service building that also houses a pre-school.

The school district is located six miles northeast of downtown Minneapolis. It is the smallest geographic school district in Minnesota, serving over 1700 students.

The St. Anthony–New Brighton School District (Independent School District No. 282) is based in Hennepin County, Minnesota, where the district’s administrative offices are located in the city of St. Anthony. However, the district serves communities in both Hennepin and Ramsey counties. St. Anthony Village spans the two counties, while the portion of New Brighton served by the district lies entirely within Ramsey County.

== District Schools ==
- St. Anthony Village High School
- St. Anthony Village Middle School
- Wilshire Park Elementary School

== See also ==
- List of school districts in Minnesota
