= Saint Thomas Academy =

Location
- 949 Mendota Heights Road; Mendota Heights, Minnesota 55120; United States; 44°52′5″N 93°8′14″W

Information
- Type: Private military high school
- Motto: Ex Umbris In Veritatem (Out of Darkness into Truth)
- Religious affiliation: Roman Catholic
- Patron saint: Saint Thomas Aquinas
- Established: September 8, 1885; 141 years ago
- Founder: John Ireland
- Sister school: Convent of the Visitation
- Oversight: Archdiocese of Saint Paul and Minneapolis
- Headmaster: Brian Ragatz
- Faculty: 108
- Grades: 6–12
- Gender: Boys
- Enrollment: 596 (2026)
- Campus size: 88 acres (360,000 m^{2})
- Colors: Royal Blue and White
- Fight song: "Kaydet Rouser"
- Athletics conference: MSHSL Metro East; (formerly Classic Suburban)
- Sports: 15 sports
- Team name: Cadets
- Rival: Cretin-Derham Hall Raiders; Two Rivers Warriors
- Accreditation: North Central Association of Colleges and Schools, Independent Schools Association of the Central States
- Publication: Cadence Literary Magazine
- Yearbook: Kaydet
- Tuition: $24,200 (grades 9-12); $21,500 (grades 7-8); $18,500 (grade 6)
- Website: cadets.com

Saint Thomas Academy (abbr. STA), originally known as St. Thomas Aquinas Seminary and formerly known as St. Thomas Military Academy, is an all-male, Catholic military high school in Mendota Heights, Minnesota. The academy has a middle school (grades 6–8) and a high school (grades 9–12). The high school students are required to participate in military leadership classes, as the school was previously part of Army JROTC. Its sister school, Convent of the Visitation, is located across the street. Many classes and after-school activities involve both schools. It is located within the Archdiocese of Saint Paul and Minneapolis.

== History ==
Saint Thomas Academy was first founded as Saint Thomas Seminary by Archbishop John Ireland on September 8, 1885. STA became a U.S. Army school in 1905, and, in 1916, part of the Junior Reserve Officers' Training Corps (JROTC). In 1922, the Seminary's Academic Department separated into College of St. Thomas and St. Thomas Military Academy. Later, in 1965, the school moved to its current campus in Mendota Heights (though in a smaller iteration). A middle school was added in 1971, composing of seventh and eighth grades. STA closed its boarding school program in 1974. In 2015, the school separated from the JROTC, though it retained its military curriculum and required courses. The inaugural sixth grade class joined the academy in 2017.

== Traditions ==
Each year, on the Wednesday preceding Thanksgiving, one senior is awarded the rank of Cadet Colonel, the brigade commander, and is presented with the Fleming Saber, in honor of Richard E. Fleming.

The Corps of Cadets, as the high school students are sometimes referred to, is inspected by representatives from the National Guard in the springtime. This day is called the Brigade Formal Inspection, or BFI. In addition to checking their formal uniforms, the representative asks a few questions, most of which concern the school, its history, or U.S. Army. A score out of 600 is given to the school. If the score is high enough, the students get to remove their ties for the remainder of the year. Usually, this announcement is accompanied by a celebratory throwing-of-ties during the formation time.

In the spring, the high school student body dons their formal uniforms (Class A1) for the Archbishop's Review, in which the students march around the school's track while being watched by the Archbishop of Minneapolis and St. Paul.

== Sports and activities ==
Saint Thomas Academy was a member of the Classic Suburban Conference (now Metro East). They participate in all 14 Minnesota State High School League sports as well as orienteering. Saint Thomas Academy also has various co-curricular activities such as band, a chess team, a debate team, VISTA Theater Company, a math team, Quiz Bowl, Knowledge Bowl, Table Tennis Club, Experimental Vehicle Team (2005 Dell-Winston School Solar Car Challenge Champions, 2006 Solar Bike Race champions, and two-time Shell Eco-marathon champions), Model United Nations, and rifle and drill teams. 83% of students participate in at least one sport.

State Championships
Season	Sport	Number of Championships	Year
Fall	Football	3	1975
Fall	Soccer	1	2016
Winter	Alpine skiing, Boys	7	1993, 1997, 2001, 2003, 2009, 2010, 2011
Winter	Hockey, Boys	8	1926, 1951, 1955, 2006, 2008, 2011, 2012, 2013
Winter	Swimming and Diving, Boys	26	1951, 1952, 1961, 1962, 1963, 1964, 1965, 1966, 1967, 1968, 1969, 1970, 1995, 1999, 2000, 2001, 2002, 2003, 2005, 2006, 2007, 2008, 2012, 2013, 2014, 2015, 2016, 2025, 2026
Winter	Basketball, Boys	11	1923, 1948, 1949, 1950, 1951, 1953, 1960, 1967, 1970, 1998, 2007
Winter	Rifle team, Boys	5	2008, 2009, 2010, 2011, 2012, 2013, 2014, 2015, 2016
Spring	Baseball, Boys	3	1952, 1960, 1969, 2019
Spring	Golf, Boys	5	1957, 1958, 1959, 1969, 2014
Spring	Tennis, Boys	4	1922, 1961, 1963, 1972
Spring	Track and field, Boys	2	1958, 1972

== Notable alumni ==
- Joseph K. Bratton '44, lieutenant general
- Javiar Collins '96, football player
- Christopher Cox '70, former chairman of SEC; former United States House Representative (R-CA) and Committee Chairman
- Pat Eilers '85, football player
- Congressman Tom Emmer '79, US representative for Minnesota's 6th congressional district
- Vince Flynn '84, author
- Tommy Gibbons '09,
- Thomas F. Gallagher, judge
- Alfred Gruenther '19, general
- Fallon Kelly, judge
- Angelo John Giuliani '30, baseball player
- Richard E. Fleming '35, World War II Medal of Honor recipient
- Leo Richard Hamilton, member of Wisconsin State Assembly
- Matt Hanousek '82, football player
- John Horan '51, basketball player
- Edward Leo Krumpelmann, Catholic priest
- Jim Lange, TV game show host
- Tom Malchow '95, swimmer, 200-meter backstroke Olympic gold and silver medalist
- Joseph T. O'Neill '49, lawyer and legislator
- James O'Shaughnessy '78, financial consultant
- Tim O'Shaughnessy '00, president and CEO at Graham Holdings Company
- David Raih '99, football player
- Isaac Rosefelt '03, basketball player
- Patrick J. Ryan '19, Catholic priest
- Matt Schnobrich '97, rowing athlete
- Jordan Schroeder, hockey player
- Ali Selim '79, director
- James P. Shannon '39, bishop
- Ben Tracy '94, journalist
- Chris Thome '87, football player
- Michael W. Wright '56, businessman

Preceded by Horace Greeley High School	National Academic Championship; 2004 Champion	Succeeded by Holland Hall (Tulsa, Oklahoma)
