= Mounds Park Academy =

Prep school in Maplewood, Minnesota, US

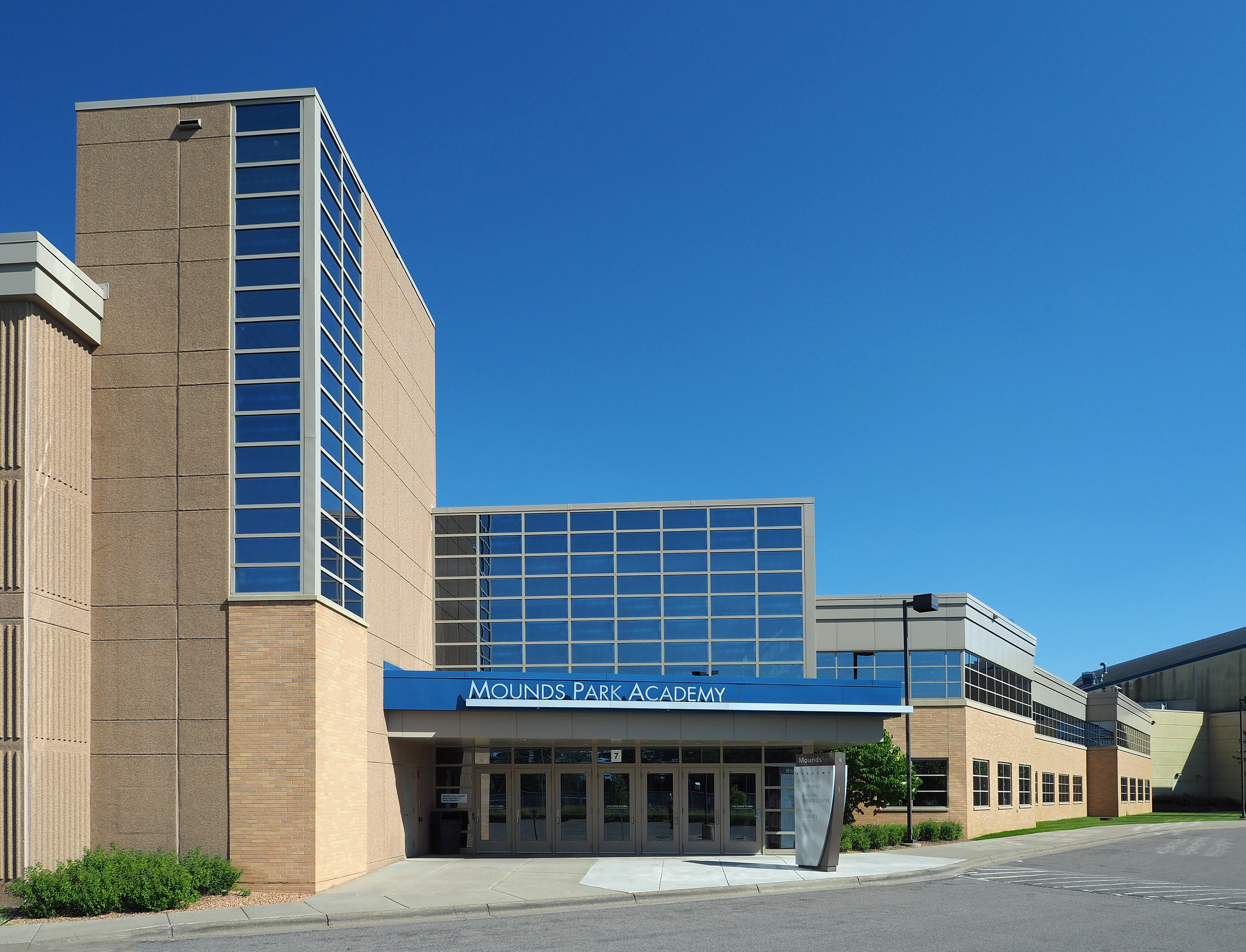
- Mounds Park Academy's northwest entrance

Location
- 2051 Larpenteur Avenue E. Maplewood, Minnesota 55109; United States; 44°59′37″N 93°0′50″W

Information
- Type: Independent, college preparatory, day
- Motto: Dream Big. Do Right.
- Established: 1982
- Head of school: Dr. Lori-Anne Brogdon
- Enrollment: 550 (approx.)
- Colors: Blue and White
- Athletics conference: Independent Metro Athletic Conference
- Mascot: Panther
- Website: www.moundsparkacademy.org

Mounds Park Academy (MPA), founded in 1982, is an independent, PreK-12, co-educational, college preparatory day school in Maplewood, Minnesota, United States, serving students from throughout the Minneapolis–Saint Paul metropolitan area. The school is accredited by and is a member of the Independent Schools Association of the Central States. It is also a member of the National Association of Independent Schools and The College Board. The school is a 246,000-square-foot (22,900 m^{2}) facility, on a campus of more than 32 acres (130,000 m^{2}).

== History ==
Mounds Park Academy was founded by Bob Kreischer and Sandy Kreischer Smith in 1982. That fall, there were 100 students enrolled. By 1986, MPA had quadrupled its enrollment and celebrated its first graduating class of nine students. Today MPA has around 500 students in Pre-Kindergarten through 12th grade, and graduates as many as 65 students each year.

MPA was originally going to be located in the Mounds Park neighborhood of Saint Paul. By the time the school opened, the location had changed to Larpenteur Avenue; however, the school's name and mission stayed the same.

== Technology ==
The academy has had a 1:1 laptop program in the upper school since 1996, and added a 1:1 laptop program to the middle school in 2013.

The entire campus at Mounds Park Academy is wireless, with several types of computer workstations and four labs located throughout the school. Many Lower School classrooms and the Library have computers available for quiet study or research. The Library features an online catalog system and research-oriented databases.

Mounds Park Academy was one of the first schools in Minnesota to initiate a 1:1 laptop program. All teachers at MPA, as well as all students in the Upper School, are provided with a laptop computer, which is used for in-class learning as well as homework.

In the fall of 2017, MPA opened the AnnMarie Thomas Makerspace—the only creative center of its kind in the Twin Cities for students in grades PreK through 12.

== Fine Arts ==
All students in lower and middle school participate in music, theater, and visual arts. In Upper School, students take fine arts courses as electives. There are multiple bands and orchestras, singing ensembles, and art classes in which students can participate. A variety of theater classes are also offered to upper school students. Each year, there is a middle school play, an upper school winter show, and an upper school spring musical.

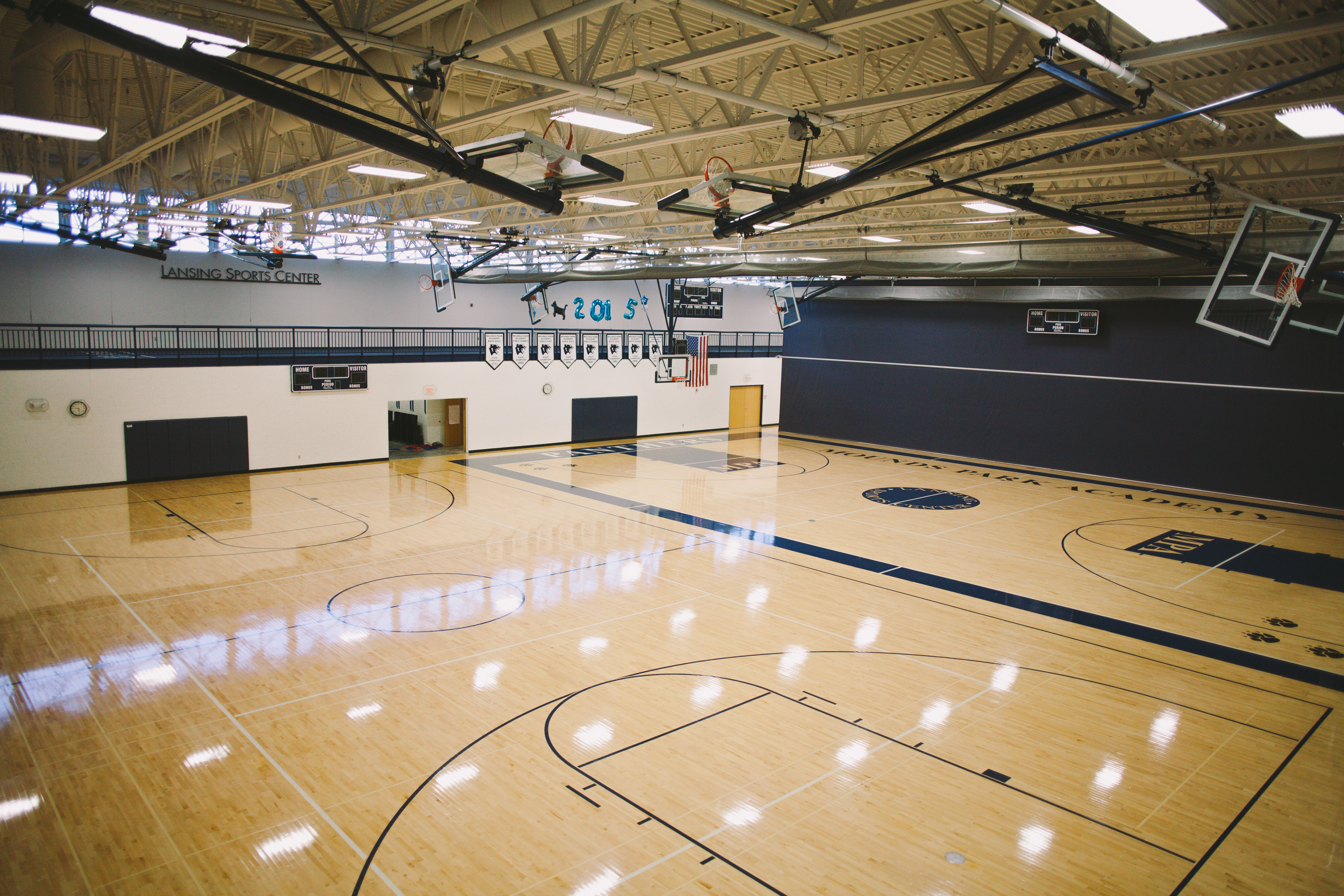
The Lansing Sports Center opened in 2006.

== Athletics ==
The academy offers: volleyball, soccer, football, basketball, Nordic skiing, Alpine skiing, baseball, softball, track and field, cross country running, tennis, and golf. Swim Club is offered at the lower and middle school levels. MPA's athletic teams compete in the Independent Metro Athletic Conference of the Minnesota State High School League. Mounds Park Academy has won 11 MSHSL State Team Championships and had 28 MSHSL Individual Champions.

== Extracurricular activities ==
MPA offers over 70 extracurricular opportunities. Almost all students participate in at least one activity.

Upper School (9-12) Activities: Admission Ambassadors, Chess Club, Debate Team, Diversity Club, Environmental Club, Entrepreneurship Club, French Club, Gender Sexual Action, International Thespian Society, Math League, National Honor Society, Newspaper (Free Thinker), Peer Leaders, Quiz Bowl, Robotics Team, Sailing Team, Social Consciousness Club, Spanish Club, Speech Team, Spring Show, Student Council, Winter Show, and Yearbook (Gnomon).

Middle School (5-8) Activities: Band, Book Festival Chess Club, Choir, Coding Club, Destination Imagination (7&8), Dynamic Cartoons, Fencing, French Cooking, Karate, Lego Robotics, Mad Science, Math Counts (7&8), Math Masters (5&6), Middle School Dances, Middle School Play, MPA Spring Musical, Orchestra, Piano Lessons, Quiz Bowl (7&8), Sailing Club (7&8), Science Club, Sports Club (5th Grade), Student Council, Swim Team and World Language Contests.

Lower School (PreK-4) Activities: Golf, Guitar Lessons, Karate, Piano Lessons, STEAM Club, Swim Team, Tumbling, and Dynamic Cartoons.

== Facilities ==
- Athletic facilities include 8 tennis courts, a 400m outdoor track and soccer stadium, four-court Lansing Sports Center with 200m running track, full weight room, training rooms and stadium seating for 800 people
- Fine arts facilities include a black box theatre, scene shop, multi use art gallery, ceramics, painting, drawing and photography studios, band, orchestra and choir rooms, and The Nicholson Performing Arts Center
- Other facilities include a commons space for upper school students, outdoor courtyard, robotics lab, recital hall, playground, 6 science labs, library and makerspace

== Transportation ==
MPA offers bussing from 5 Twin Cities communities: Saint Paul, Roseville/Shoreview/North Oaks, Woodbury, Stillwater, and Minneapolis. District 622 (North St. Paul, Oakdale, Maplewood) provides students living within its boundaries with transportation to MPA.
