= Westonka High School =

Location
- 5905 Sunnyfield Road East; Minnetrista, Minnesota 55364; United States; 44°57′18″N 93°40′19″W

Information
- Former names: Mound High School (1917–1971); Mound Westonka High School (1971–2025)
- Type: Public
- Motto: Small School Advantages. Big School Opportunities.
- Established: 1917
- School district: Westonka Public Schools
- Principal: Jolene Herfel
- Staff: 51.61 (FTE)
- Grades: 8–12
- Enrollment: 898 (2023-2024)
- Student to teacher ratio: 17.40
- Colors: Red & White
- Athletics conference: Wright County
- Mascot: White Hawks

Westonka High School a school with grades 8–12 public high school in Minnetrista, Minnesota, United States. Westonka competes in the Wright County Conference. Located west of Lake Minnetonka, Westonka Public Schools serves the westernmost portion of the lake and is located west of Minnetonka and south of Orono. Westonka High School houses over 900 students in grades 8-12.

== History ==
The Mound Consolidated High School, or simply Mound High School, was opened in the fall of 1917 in downtown Mound as part of District 85. In 1958, District 85 became Westonka District 277. In the fall of 1971, Mound High School was relocated several miles to a new building at its present location in Minnetrista and was renamed Mound Westonka High School was added to its name. The school was renamed to Westonka High School in 2025 as part of a county–wide renaming initiative.

Mound High School adopted the “Mohawk” mascot in the 1930s, in part because Mound was named for the ancient Native American burial mounds located within its borders. In the fall of 1997, the school mascot was changed to the White Hawks.

Voters in the district approved $22.95 million in bond funding in May 2016, resulting in major additions to the south (Westonka Activity Center) and east (Westonka Performing Arts Center). Designed by Wold Architects and Engineers and built by Kraus-Anderson, they were completed in 2018.

== Awards and recognitions ==
Westonka Public Schools is ranked as the No. 1 traditional public school district in the state and No. 4 overall out of 446 Minnesota districts by Schooldigger. U.S. News and World Report ranked Westonka High School as the No. 10 traditional public high school in Minnesota and the No. 18 "Best High School" overall in the state. Three Westonka schools were named among America’s Healthiest Schools for 2025 - National children’s health organization Alliance for a Healthier Generation recognized both of Westonka’s primary schools, Hilltop Primary and Shirley Hills Primary, as well as Westonka High School, for their commitment to advancing whole child health.

This year, only four schools in Minnesota earned the America’s Healthiest Schools distinction. Hilltop and Shirley Hills were awarded in the “Strengthening Social-Emotional Health & Learning” category, while Westonka High School was recognized for “Supporting School Health Services.”

The original structure, designed by Hammel, Green and Abrahamson, won a 1972 AIA Minnesota Merit Award.

Westonka High School is ranked among the top high schools in the United States by several national publications.

Westonka ranked fifth in Minnesota and 104th in the country on Newsweek's 2014 list of "America's Top High Schools." WHS was also named to U.S. News & World Report's 2014 "Best High Schools" list, The Washington Post's 2014 "America's Most Challenging High Schools" list and Niche's 2014 "Best Public High Schools" list. The Westonka School District was named to the College Board's AP District Honor Roll in 2012 for increasing access to Advanced Placement exams as well as scores of 3 or higher (usually the minimum to earn college credit).

== Athletics and activities ==
Activities

- Bowling
- DECA
- HOSA
- Fall Musical
- Jazz Band
- LINK Crew
- Madd Jazz
- Math League
- National Honor Society
- Quiz Bowl
- Science Olympiad
- Speech Team
- Spring Play
- Student Senate
- Robotics Team 6147 (Tonkabots)

Sports

- Fall
  - Soccer
  - Football
  - Cross Country
  - Football Cheerleading
  - Girls Swim & Dive
  - Girls Tennis
  - Volleyball
  - Mountain Biking
- Winter
  - Alpine Ski
  - Boys Basketball
  - Boys Hockey
  - Boys Swim & Dive
  - Dance Team
  - Girls Basketball
  - Girls Gymnastics
  - Girls Hockey
  - Nordic Ski
  - Wrestling
  - Wrestling Cheerleading
- Spring
  - Baseball
  - Boys Golf
  - Boys Tennis
  - Boys Lacrosse
  - Girls Golf
  - Girls Lacrosse
  - Girls Softball
  - Track and Field
  - Trap Shooting

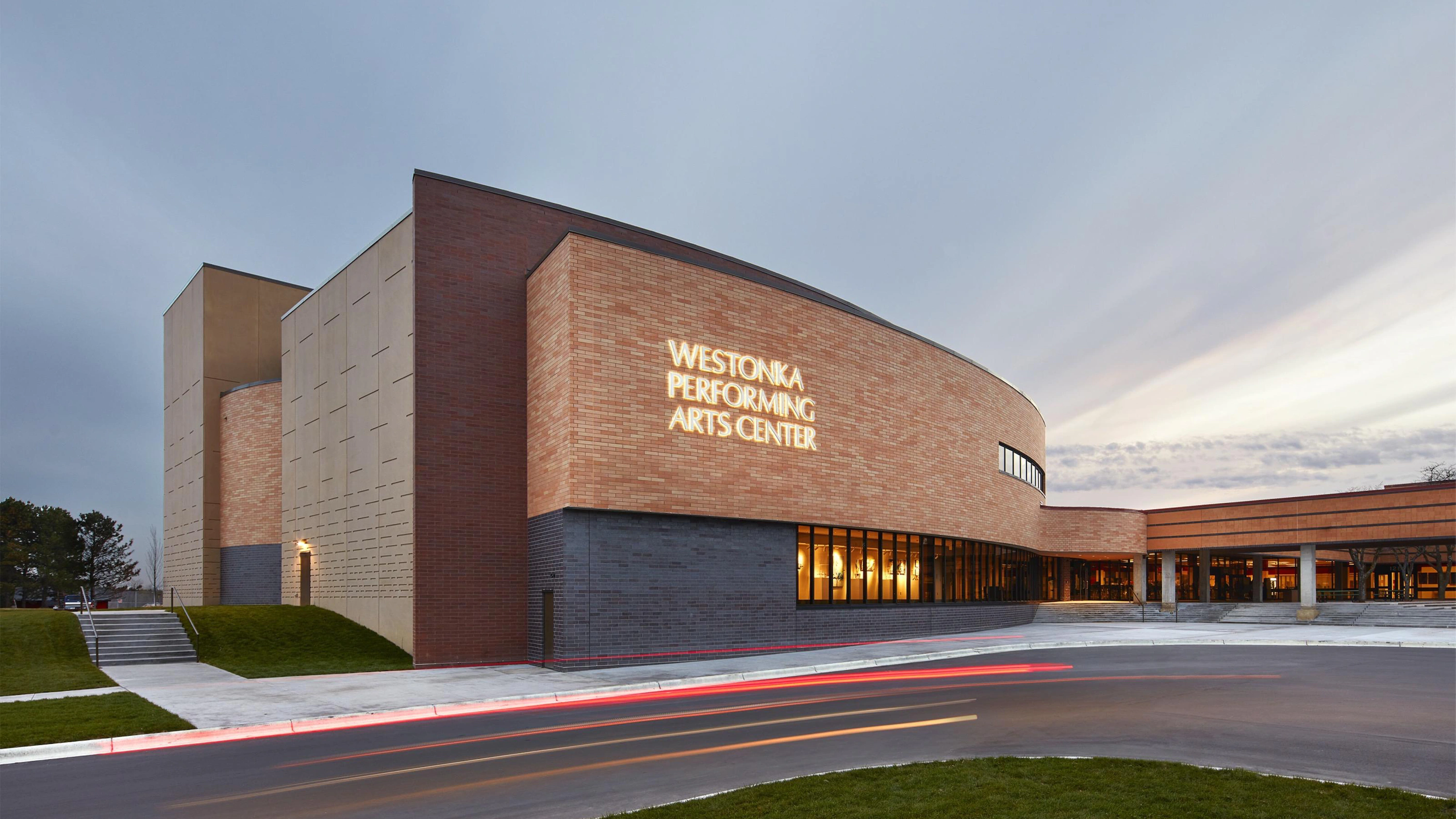
Performing Arts Center

== Campus ==
Westonka High School itself contains two levels, with separate academic wings for different teaching subjects. The school has a pool as well as an ice arena. On the exterior, the school property has three soccer fields, five baseball/softball fields, nine tennis courts, a track, and a football stadium. Following a referendum in 2016, the Westonka Performing Arts Center and Westonka Activity Center were built, both of which opened in September 2018.

== Notable alumni ==
- Kevin Sorbo, American actor
- Shane Wiskus, American Olympian gymnast
