= Riley Lucas Bartholomew House =

Historic house in Minnesota, United States

- U.S. National Register of Historic Places
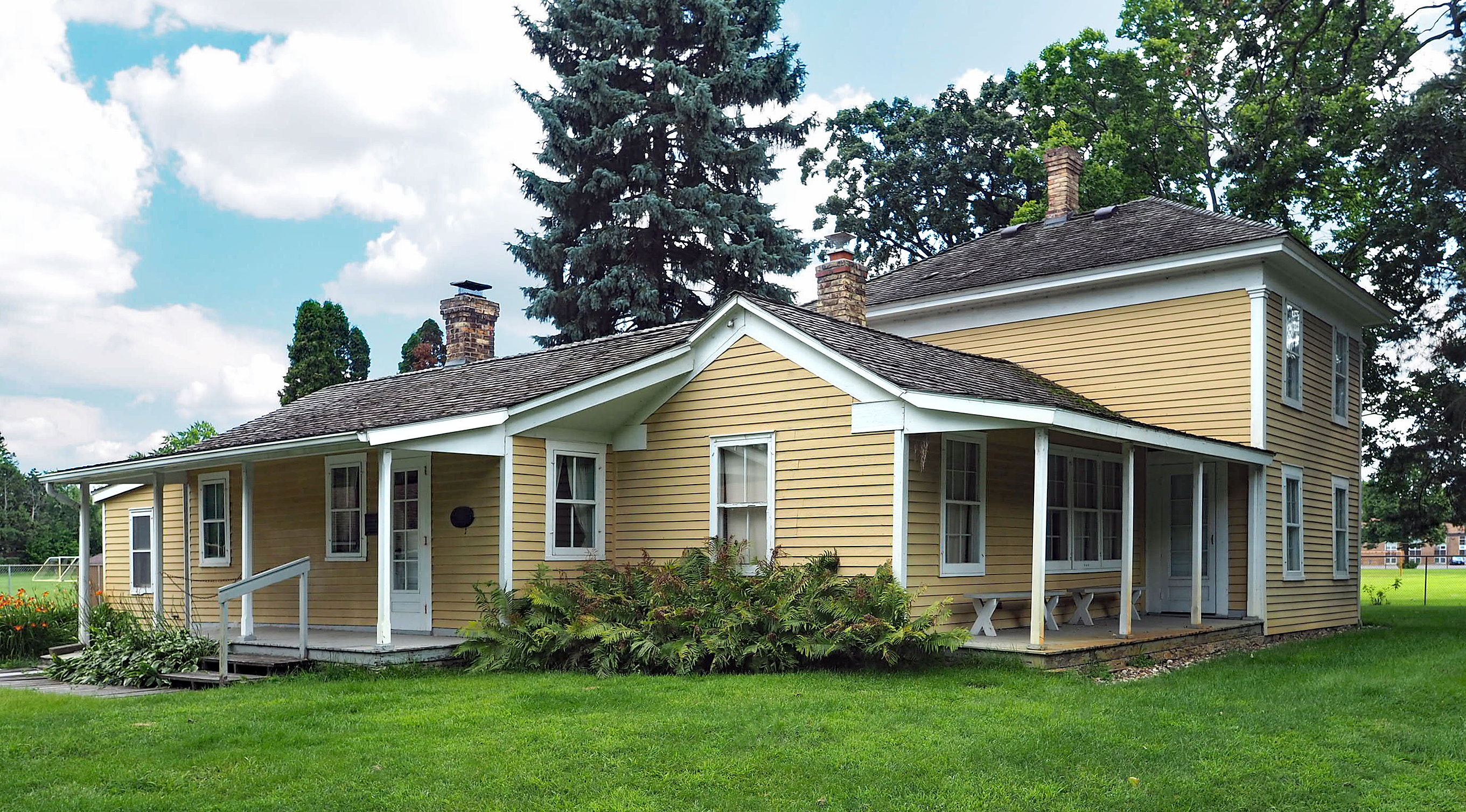
- The Riley Lucas Bartholomew House from the northwest

- Location within Minnesota Location within the United States
- Location: 6901 Lyndale Avenue South, Richfield, Minnesota
- Coordinates: 44°52′39.4″N 93°17′18.3″W
- Area: Approximately 1 acre
- Built: 1852
- Architectural style: Federal architecture
- NRHP reference No.: 78001545
- Added to NRHP: November 28, 1978

The Riley Lucas Bartholomew House is a historic house museum in Richfield, Minnesota, United States, originally the home of prominent early Minnesotan Riley Bartholomew (1807–1894). The Richfield Historical Society operates the house as the Bartholomew House Museum adjacent to their Richfield History Center.

== History ==
In 1852, when Fort Snelling was greatly reduced in size, the area that would become the city of Richfield became available for settlement. Bartholomew came to the area and filed a claim on the shores of Wood Lake. He proceeded to build the two-story section of the home with local lumber, using white pine for the floors. His wife, Fanny, and two children joined him in the spring of 1853. Soon after the construction of the house, two additions were added by moving two single story dwellings from near Minnehaha Falls and adding them on to the house. Bartholomew went on to become influential in local politics as a member of the Republican Constitutional Convention which framed the Minnesota Constitution in 1857. He also represented District Four in the Minnesota Senate. Bartholomew, who earlier in life had risen to the rank of general in the Ohio militia, also joined a company of volunteers during the Dakota War of 1862.

The house is listed on the National Register of Historic Places for local significance in military and politics/government for its association with Riley Bartholomew.

== See also ==
- National Register of Historic Places listings in Hennepin County, Minnesota
- Richfield History Center
