= Riley Bartholomew =

American politician

Riley Lucas Bartholomew
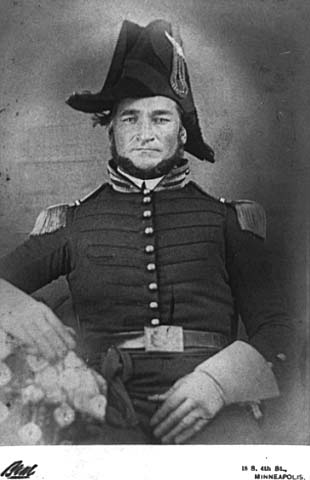
- Riley Bartholomew circa 1870
- Born: May 30, 1807
- Died: September 23, 1894 (aged 87)
- Occupations: Pioneer, politician
- Known for: Serving as state senator from 1859 to 1860
- Spouse: Fanny A. Watkins (m. 1829)
- Children: 4

Riley Lucas Bartholomew (May 30, 1807 – September 23, 1894) was a Minnesota pioneer and politician who served as state senator from 1859 to 1860.

Riley Bartholomew married Fanny A. Watkins in 1829. He became a merchant in Geneva, Ohio, selling clocks and later operating a hotel before the family moved to Jefferson, Ohio, the Ashtabula County seat. In 1848 he was elected sheriff. During his Ohio years, Riley joined the state militia, rising through the ranks to the status of general.

The Bartholomew family were among the first settlers in 1852 to establish a land claim in Richfield, Minnesota. The Bartholomews, in their mid-forties, determined to move their family and begin a new life in the Northwest. Bartholomew came from a stock that did not fear a challenge. His grandfather fought Native Americans and Tories on the New York frontier during the Revolutionary War, and his father was a veteran of the War of 1812. Bartholomew's parents, Benjamin and Susannah, settled in Ohio's northeast corner in 1807, the year of Riley's birth.

Upon arrival in Minnesota Territory, Bartholomew claimed a piece of land on the east side of Wood Lake straddling the western boundary line of the original Fort Snelling reservation. He constructed a two-story wooden house which was placed on the National Register of Historic Places on November 28, 1978, and is now run as the Riley Lucas Bartholomew House Museum by the Richfield Historical Society.

After establishing their claim, Bartholomew quickly became involved in the work of building a new community. He helped construct the first school and church in 1854. He became a justice of the peace for Hennepin County, a position he held from 1854 to 1863. His neighbors chose him as a territorial delegate to the state's 1857 constitutional convention, and Bartholomew later became a District Four representative in the state senate from 1859 to 1860. During the Dakota War of 1862 Bartholomew joined a volunteer company that came to the relief of soldiers at Fort Ridgely.

The four Bartholomew children ranged from eleven to twenty years of age when the family reached Richfield. The two eldest daughters, America and Virginia, married in 1855 and moved out to establish their own households. Youngest son, Rollin, married and left home in 1863. Oldest son, Winfield, farmed in Richfield and later took over the homestead from his parents. Virginia's husband Edgar Nash also served in the Minnesota Legislature.
