= Edgar Nash =

American businessman & politician (1832-1915)

Edgar Nash (July 8, 1832 – June 6, 1915) was an American businessman and politician.

Nash was born in Penn Yan, Yates County, New York. He lived in Duluth, Minnesota with his wife and family and was involved with the hardware business. Nash served in the United States Army during the Dakota War of 1862. Nash served in the Minnesota House of Representatives in 1872. Nash's father-in-law, Riley Bartholomew, also served in the Minnesota Legislature. Nash died at his home in Minneapolis, Minnesota and was buried in Richfield, Minnesota.
