= South Education Center =

Coordinates: 44.8679°N 93.3110°W

South Education Center is a special education and alternative school in the 7400 block of South Penn Avenue in Richfield, Minnesota. It is part of Intermediate District 287. Eleven school districts from Minneapolis and environs send their students to the center. The population served is from pre-Kinder to 21 years of age. The school defines its upper-age limit as "Transition". In 2022 there were 200 students. In the early 2020s, the school served about 80% minority students. Federally, the school is classified as suburban.

Built for 350 students, the $25.4 million building construction began in 2006, and has lockdown capability: classrooms and areas can be electronically isolated. The school features an Accessible Art Garden opened in 2012, and in 2020 the students and teachers extended their art practice to the school's fence. In 2016 the school phased out its use of metal detectors and instead provided with school safety coaches. The school trained its staff in "trauma, crisis and de-escalation".

In September 2021, the Superintendent said that the school "serves some of the highest-needs students in the state". In 2022, she added that the school's focus is to provide "destigmatized mental health support". That same year, following the fatal shooting of a student outside the South Education Center, the school district reinstated the metal detectors it had retired in 2016 because of "concerns about criminalizing student behavior."

== Shooting ==
In early 2022 a student was killed in front of the school and two injured, one seriously. A 20-year old was convicted for his involvement in the killing of a fellow student and sentenced to three years in prison. The 19-year old who shot and killed the student would later be sentenced to 23.5 years in prison after being convicted for murder and also pleading guilty to assault.

== Awards ==
The school won the 2011 Grand Prize from Food and Nutrition Service, an agency of the United States Department of Agriculture. The prize was part of the Healthy Kids Recipe Competition promoted at the time by the White House.
