= Intellectual disability and higher education in the United States =

Post-secondary education for students with intellectual disabilities in the United States refers to the opportunities and challenges faced by these students when pursuing higher education. Historically, individuals with intellectual disabilities (ID) have faced barriers in accessing post-secondary education, primarily due to restrictions in federal student aid and academic prerequisites. However, the enactment of the Higher Education Opportunity Act of 2008 introduced significant changes, allowing students with ID to qualify for federal student grants and work-study programs. Over the last two decades, there has been a growth in specialized PSE programs designed for students with ID, focusing on fostering skills beyond traditional academic achievements, such as increased independence, self-determination, and employment readiness.

== Background ==
In previous years, students in the United States who have been diagnosed to have intellectual disabilities (ID) cannot have access or have difficulty having access to post-secondary education (PSE). One significant reason why these students have been marginalized from continuing their education is their being denied federal student aid. Many were disqualified due to the lack of having a high school diploma while others were not able to pass standardized tests which should indicate if their claim to secure aid is justified. With the legislation of the Higher Education Opportunity Act of 2008, students with ID can now qualify for student grants and work-study programs.

=== History ===
Over the past two decades, PSE programs for students with ID have surged in the U.S., with financial backing from the Office of Post-secondary Education starting in 2010.

Although attaining any type of academic degree is not possible for many students with ID, they do stand to benefit from participating in PSE programs. The benefits do not necessarily lead to traditional measures of academic achievement. Instead, students gain increased independence, self-determination, positive social experiences, self-advocacy, problem solving, self-monitoring and goal setting and time management skills. All of these skills help students be more independent, improve their psychological well-being and provide them stronger opportunities to find employment.

In a study conducted by Ross and colleagues, researchers compared employment and independent living outcomes of 125 graduates from the Taft College Transition to Independent Living (TIL) program designed for students with intellectual and developmental disabilities with outcomes from the general population of people with ID and developmental disabilities. The researchers found that 94% of TIL graduates lived by themselves, with their spouse or roommates in a home that they rented or owned compared to only 16% in the general population. Furthermore, the study found that 95% of graduates continue to socialize with fellow alumni through home visits, phone calls or email.

=== Employment Outcomes ===
Historically, students with ID have faced poor employment prospects. For instance, in 2009, only 35% of young adults aged 21–25 with ID were employed, compared to a 90.2% employment rate among the general population. That same year, 40.3% of employees with ID earned less the federal minimum wage. The combination of an increasing number of jobs requiring some type of education after high school and their history of exclusion from the higher education system have led to this conclusion. In the past, employment options for people with ID have been limited to supported employment and sheltered workshops.

Going to college is often connected with getting well paying jobs and higher employment rates. This premise applies to students with disabilities including those with ID. Students that attend a PSE program are more likely to find employment than those who only complete high school. Using the American Community Survey (ACS) researchers compared findings on people with disabilities, with cognitive disabilities and no disabilities. They found that 43% of people with cognitive disabilities and some college credit were employed compared to 31% who had only completed high school.

Additionally, students with ID who attend a PSE program are more likely to earn higher wages. For example, Ross and colleagues (2012) found that 87% of TIL graduates who were employed earned at least the minimum wage. In one study, researchers compare the employment outcomes of alumni from two PSE programs and a control group made up of people who never attended a program by surveying the participants. They found that students who attended a PSE program were employed at higher frequencies in office support at 58%, sales at 17% and teaching at 17%.

== Inclusion in Higher Education ==
Advocacy groups like the DREAM Partnership and Think College have pioneered the effort to make college accessible and achievable for students with ID. Despite the evident advantages of PSE, only 37% of students with ID pursue higher education after high school. Once in college, even though students with disabilities participate in campus events and students life, they tend to feel as lonely as non-students.) Still, progress has been made. For example, in K-12 education, students with disabilities are increasingly getting more integrated into mainstream classrooms and are succeeding with reasonable supports.

== Supports and accommodations ==
In the U.S., several laws ensure individuals with disabilities receive adequate accommodations in education. Notably, section 504 of the Rehabilitation Act of 1973 and the Americans with Disabilities Act ensure that these students receive required supports. These supportive accommodations may vary from college to college but usually include the assistance of a designated note taker, extended time for tests, taking tests at a designated quiet space, voice recorders for lectures and assistive technology computer software such as text-to-speech and speech recognition software. Additionally, peer mentors, coaches, or ambassadors often support students by assisting with assignments and campus activities.

== Post-secondary education programs ==
There are two main paths for students with ID that are interested in continuing their education after high school. One path, known as the inclusive, individual support model, is to complete entrance examinations, applications and complete degree requirements with the use of accommodations (Hart, Grigal & Weir, 2015). The second path is to not matriculate but instead enter into PSE program designed for students with ID. In these programs, students may take credit or non credit courses, audit courses or take extended study courses. The minimum requirements to be admitted into a PSE program are to read at a third grade minimum and not be considered able to attain a degree with support.

Currently, there are over 220 PSE programs in the United States. While wide variation exists among programs, they do share several features. For example, they do not focus on academic access; the focus is on independent living skills and employment development. Programs usually collaborate with outside organizations such as local school districts, the department of rehabilitation and local non-profit community organizations. In addition, programs use person centered planning to develop a structure that will help the student meet their goals.

PSE programs can be categorized into three types: the dual enrollment model, the substantively separate model and the mixed model. Close to a third of PSE programs in the United States follow the dual enrollment model. Programs with this model are funded through the Individuals with Disabilities Education Act of 2004. The act provides for special education transition services to students with ID up to the age of 21 to attend college. In these programs, students attend high school and college courses simultaneously. The college courses may be restricted to non-credit, continuing education or to courses specifically designed for students with ID.

Programs that follow the substantively separate approach hold student courses and social activities on campus yet the courses are restricted to their program. These programs tend to serve larger student populations compared to the mixed programs. Moreover, students who participate in this type of programs usually have very little interaction with other students outside of the program. Mixed model programs attempts to include their students with the rest of the student body. Students are encouraged to be very active in campus activities and they take mostly inclusive courses while completing their program courses which focus on employment building skills.

== See also ==
- Minnesota Independence College and Community
- Vocational Independence Program
