= Pizza Lucé =

American pizzeria company

Coordinates: 44°58′54.1″N 93°16′25.2″W

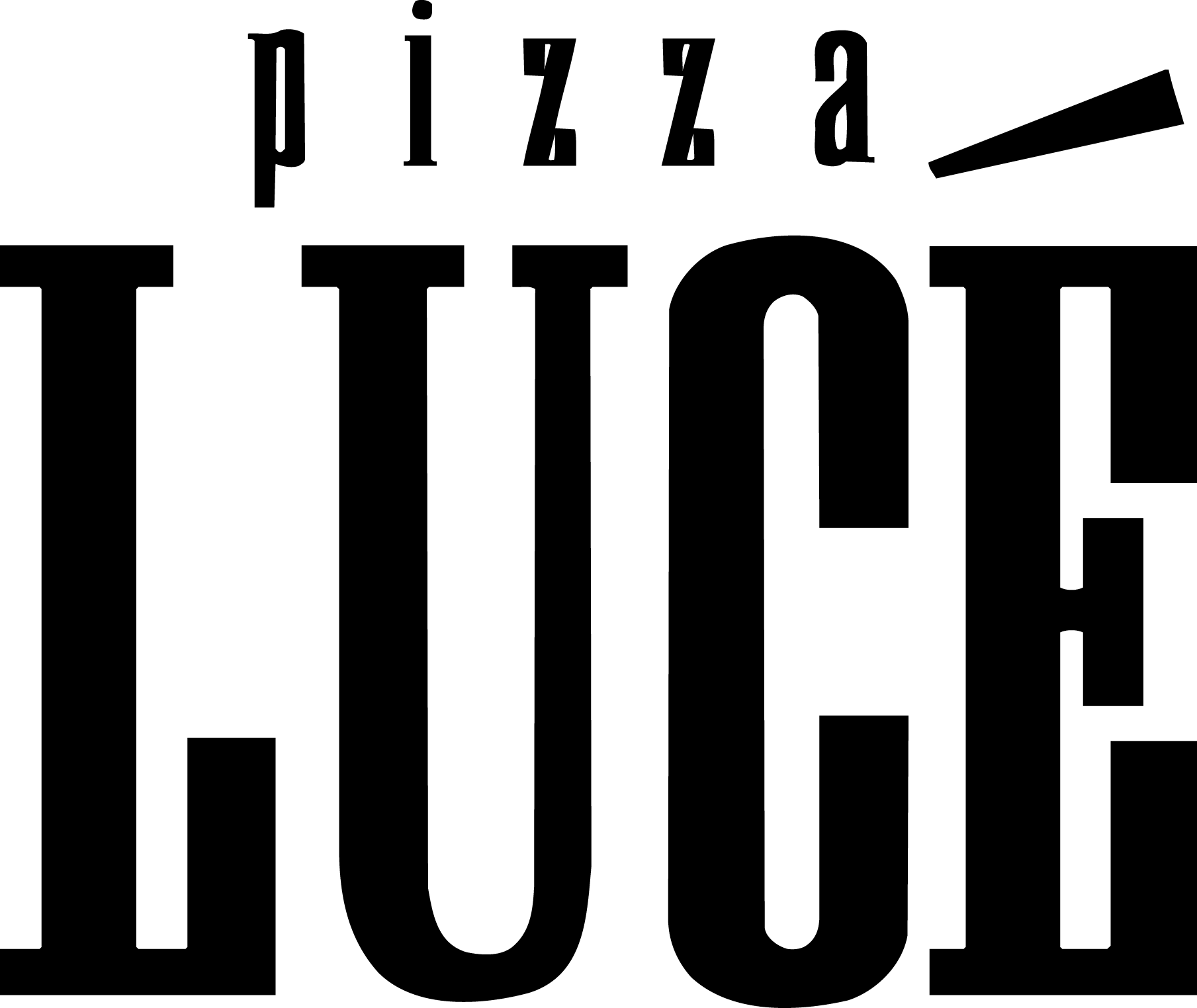
- Industry: Pizzeria
- Founded: Minneapolis, Minnesota, United States; 1993
- Founder: Joe Baier
- Number of locations: 9: Downtown Minneapolis, MN; Uptown Minneapolis, MN; Eden Prairie, MN; Duluth, MN; Hopkins, MN; Richfield, MN; Roseville, MN; Seward, Minneapolis, MN; Saint Paul, MN
- Website: pizzaluce.com

Pizza Lucé (/ˈluːtʃeɪ/) is a pizzeria restaurant company in Minnesota with locations in the Minneapolis–Saint Paul area and Duluth. Pizza Lucé was founded in 1993.

== History ==
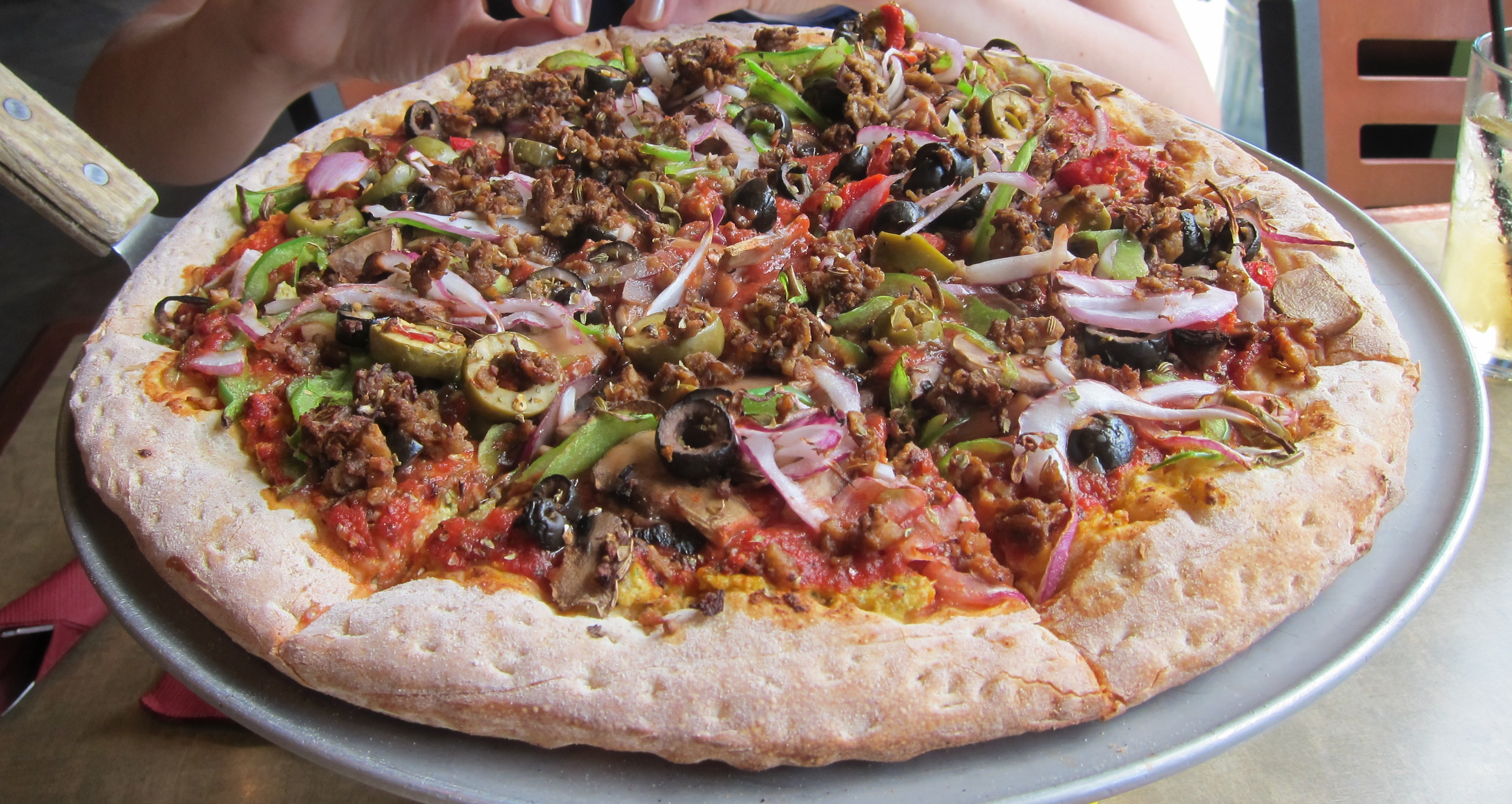
One of the restaurant's vegan pizzas

Pizza Lucé owner Joe Baier worked in pizza delivery until the pizzeria he worked at closed in 1992. Having worked for years in the industry, Baier decided to open a new pizza restaurant, named Pizza Lucé, which opened in 1993 in downtown Minneapolis. It was not initially profitable and in 1995, Scott Nelson, who had worked previously alongside Baier as a pizza deliverer, was hired as the pizzeria's General Manager helped ensure that the restaurant became profitable. The pizzeria includes gluten-free and vegan items on its menu.

Pizza Lucé has since expanded to nine locations in the Minneapolis–Saint Paul area and one in Duluth. In 2010, the pizzeria began offering online ordering and within a year over 20% of its delivery orders were placed via the Internet. Lucé was named 2011's Restaurant of the Year by the Minnesota Restaurant Association.

== Culture ==
Due to Pizza Lucé's practice of allowing workers to return to their jobs after touring with their bands, their employees have included band members from groups such as Cadillac Blindside and Clair De Lune as well as Jesse Johnson and Joshua Cain from Motion City Soundtrack.

Since 2003, Pizza Lucé has hosted an annual block party in Minneapolis, originally on the corner of Lyndale Avenue and 32nd Street, featuring artists including Brother Ali and P.O.S. The 2012 block party was cancelled and the organizers sought a larger venue for future years. In 2013, the block party was moved to the Downtown Minneapolis warehouse district location.
