= Richfield History Center =

Museum and research library in Richfield, Minnesota, US

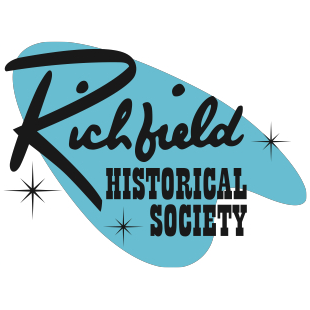

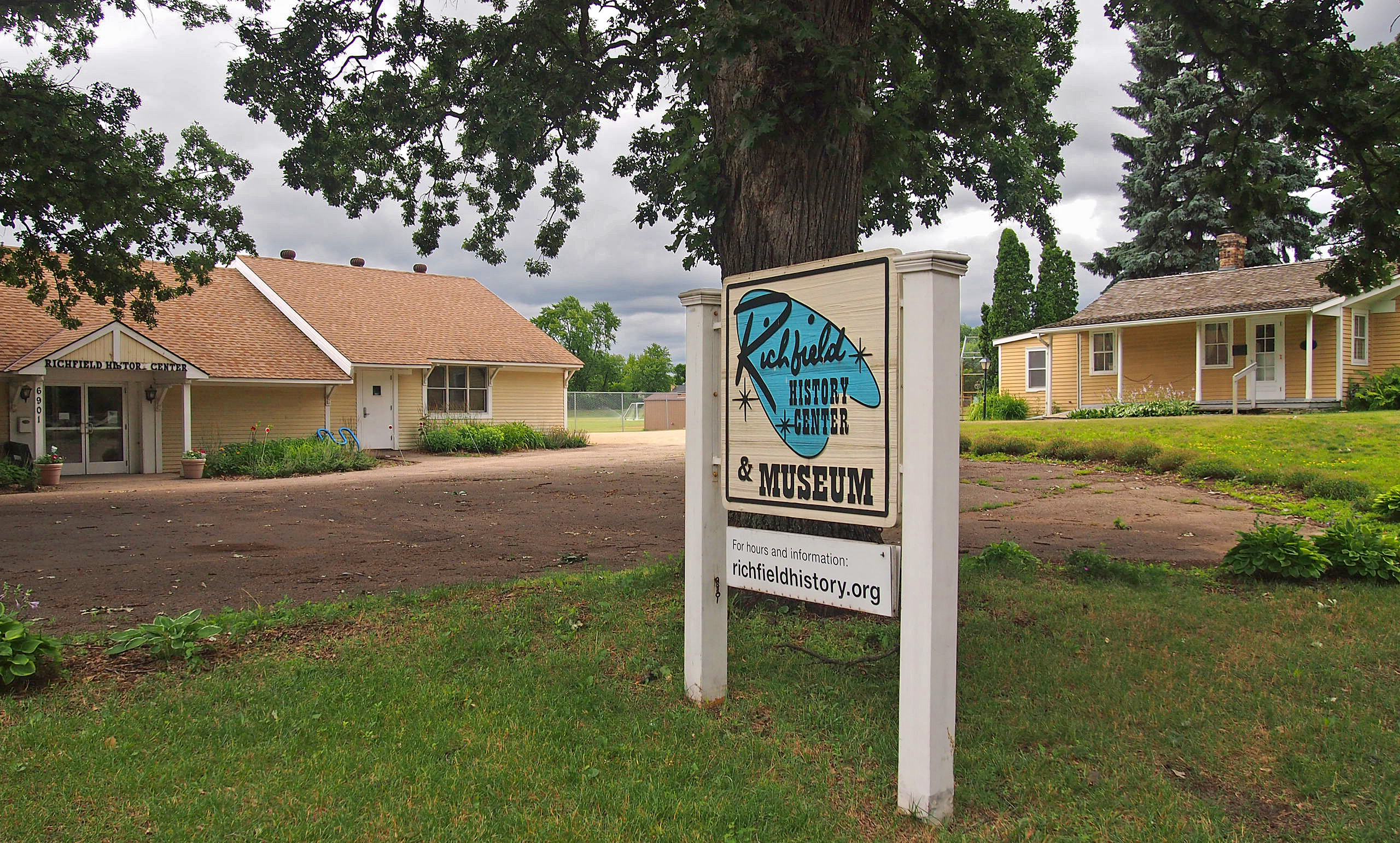
- History Center, left; Bartholomew House Museum, right
- Established: 2005
- Location: 6901 Lyndale Ave S, Richfield, Minnesota 55423
- Coordinates: 44.877778°N 93.288333°W
- Type: Local History
- Website: richfield-history.org

The Richfield History Center, established in 2005, is a resource center dedicated to collecting and exhibiting the history of Richfield, Minnesota. It is operated by the Richfield Historical Society, founded in 1967 to preserve the Bartholomew House, a historic farmstead built in 1852. The History Center offers a variety of resources for visitors interested in Richfield's past.

== Bartholomew House Museum ==
Central to the History Center's offerings is the Bartholomew House Museum. Built by Riley Lucas Bartholomew, a prominent early Minnesotan, the house stands as a reminder of Richfield's agricultural past. Visitors can tour the museum and learn about 19th-century farm life, from the daily routines of the Bartholomew family to the tools and techniques used for farming. The house itself is a unique structure, built in sections with additions from other locations. The Bartholomew House Museum offers a window into the lives of early Richfield residents and the agricultural foundation of the city.

== Collections and Programs ==
The collections encompass a wide range of materials related to Richfield's history with much of it reflecting the early settlement era between 1850s to 1890s and the communities suburbanization during the post-war boom era of the late 1940s to the 1960s. These include photographs, maps, documents, artifacts, and yearbooks. The center also maintains an oral history project, capturing the stories of Richfield residents.

The center also provides a reading room for historical research and hosts events throughout the year, such as lectures and educational programs.

The Quicksteps, a Twin Cities vintage 1860s style baseball club plays each summer in the baseball fields located next to the Richfield History Center.

== Gallery ==
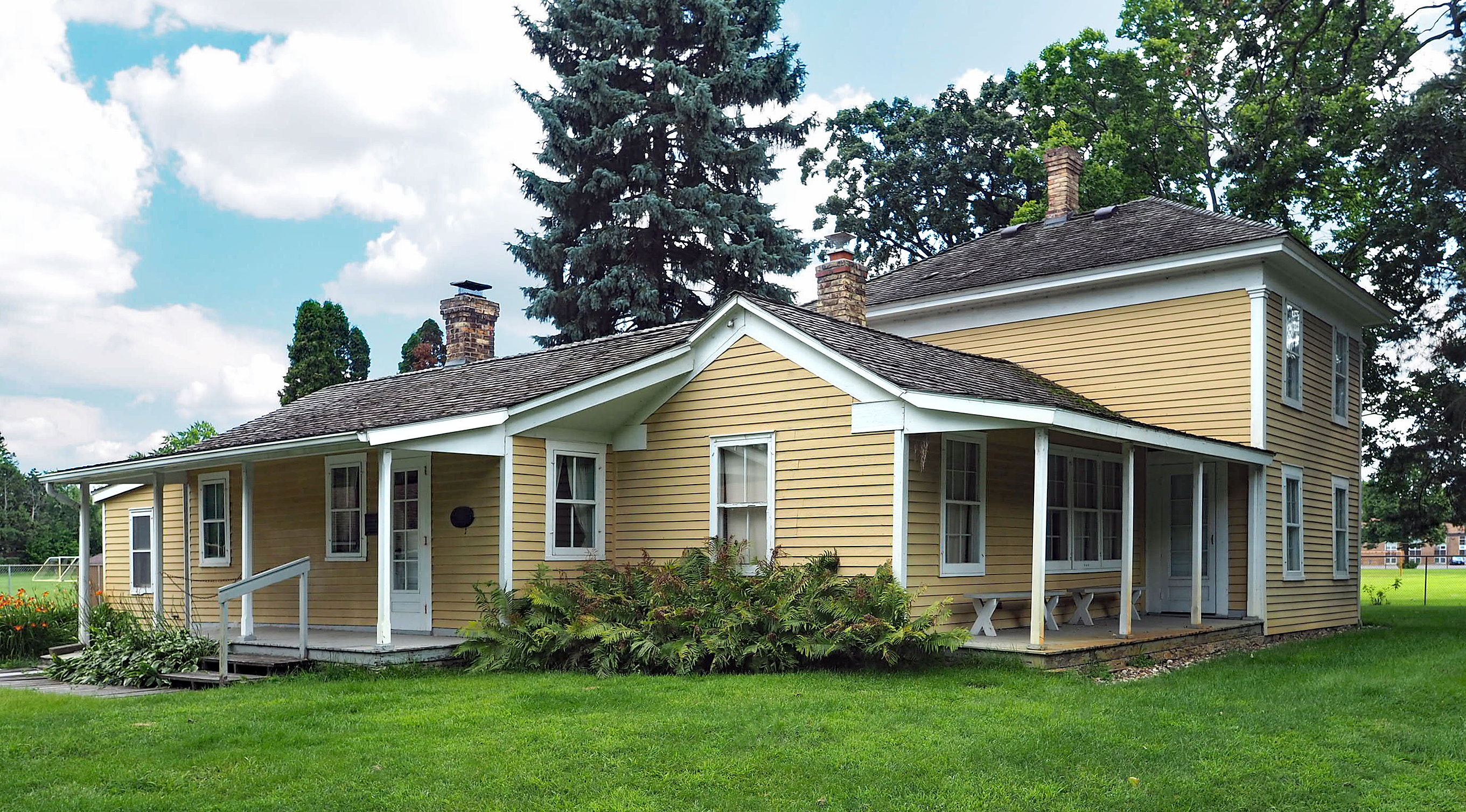
Bartholomew House Museum

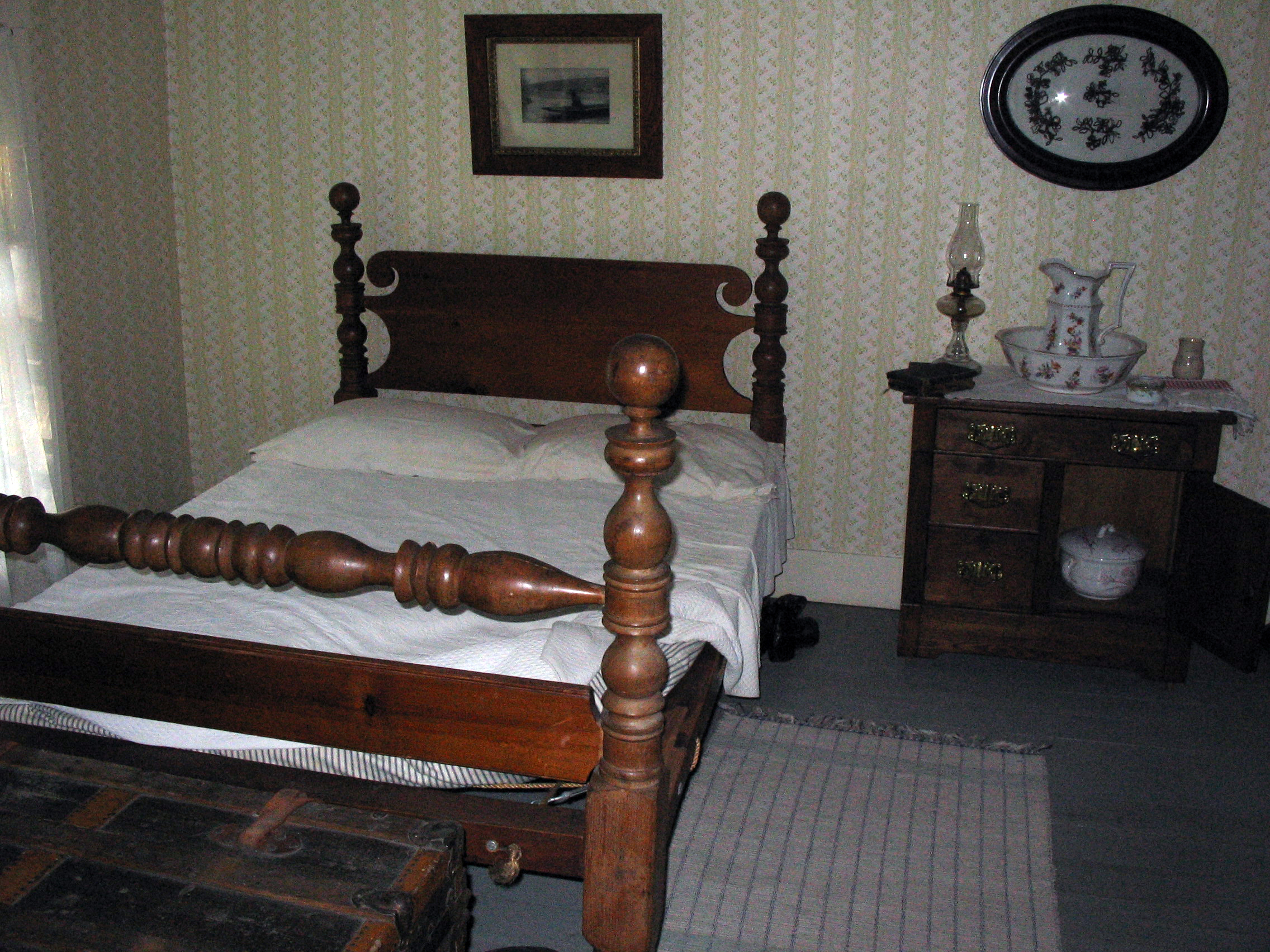
Bartholomew House, bedroom

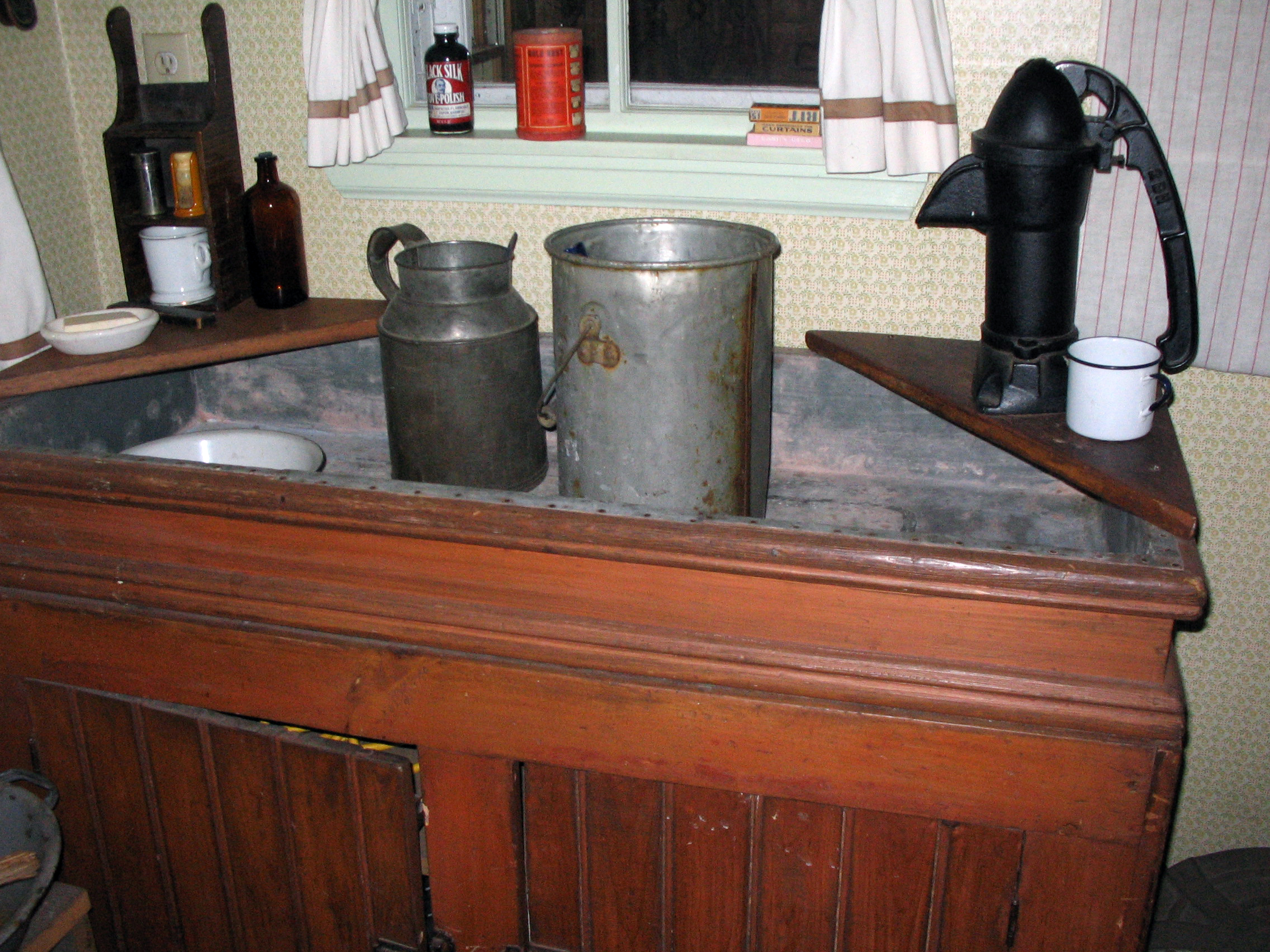
Bartholomew House, kitchen sink

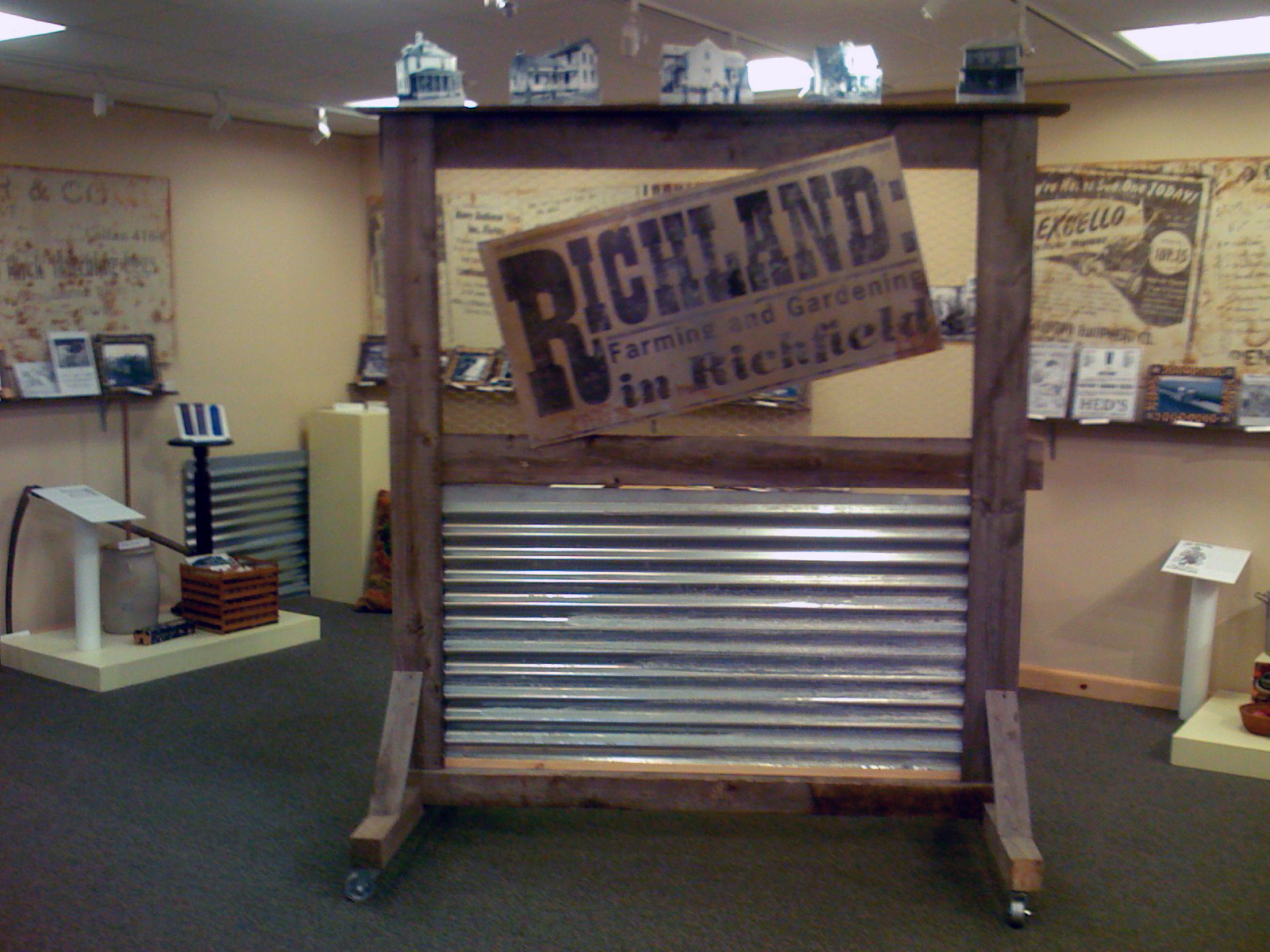
Exhibit

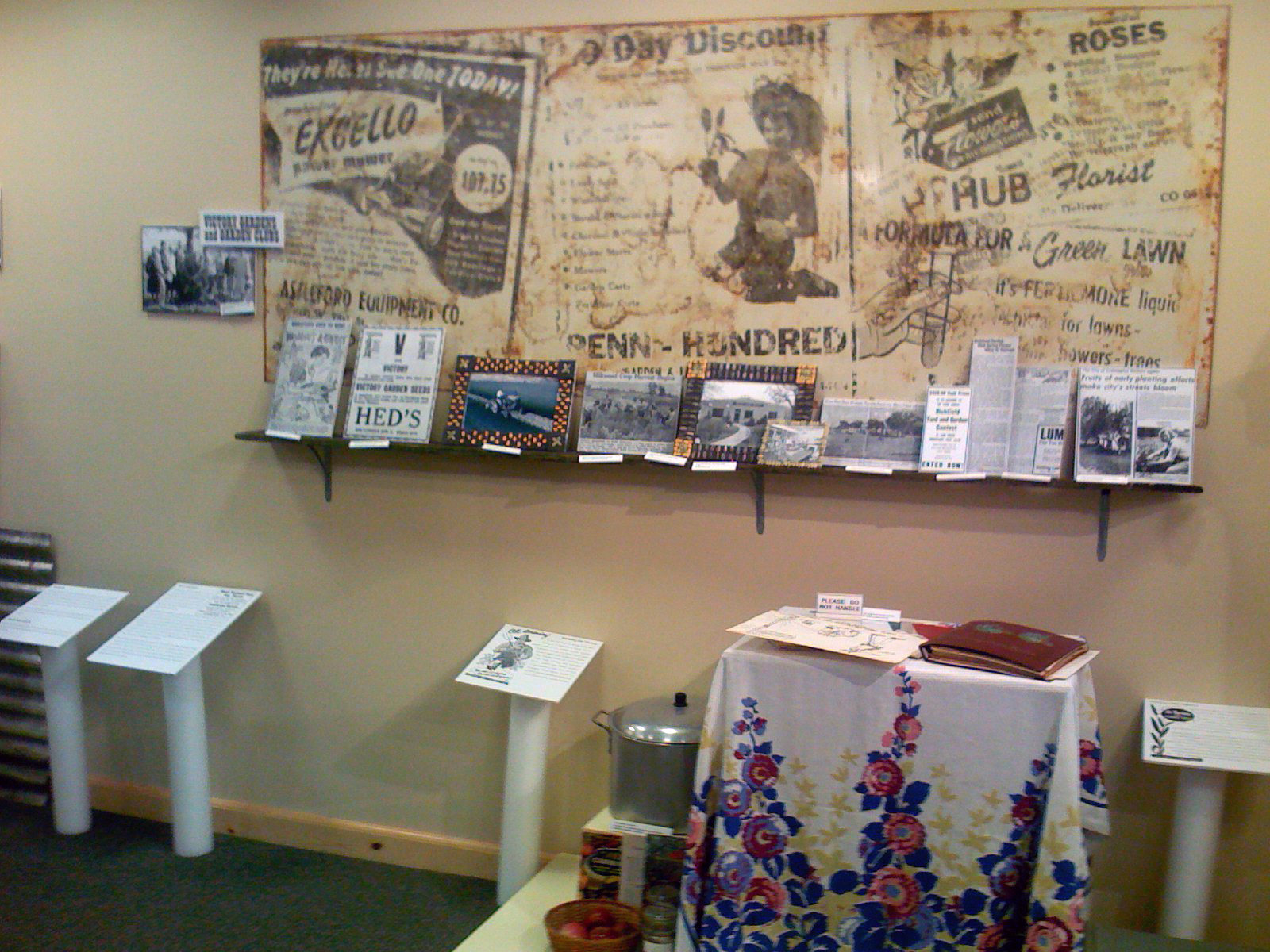
Exhibit

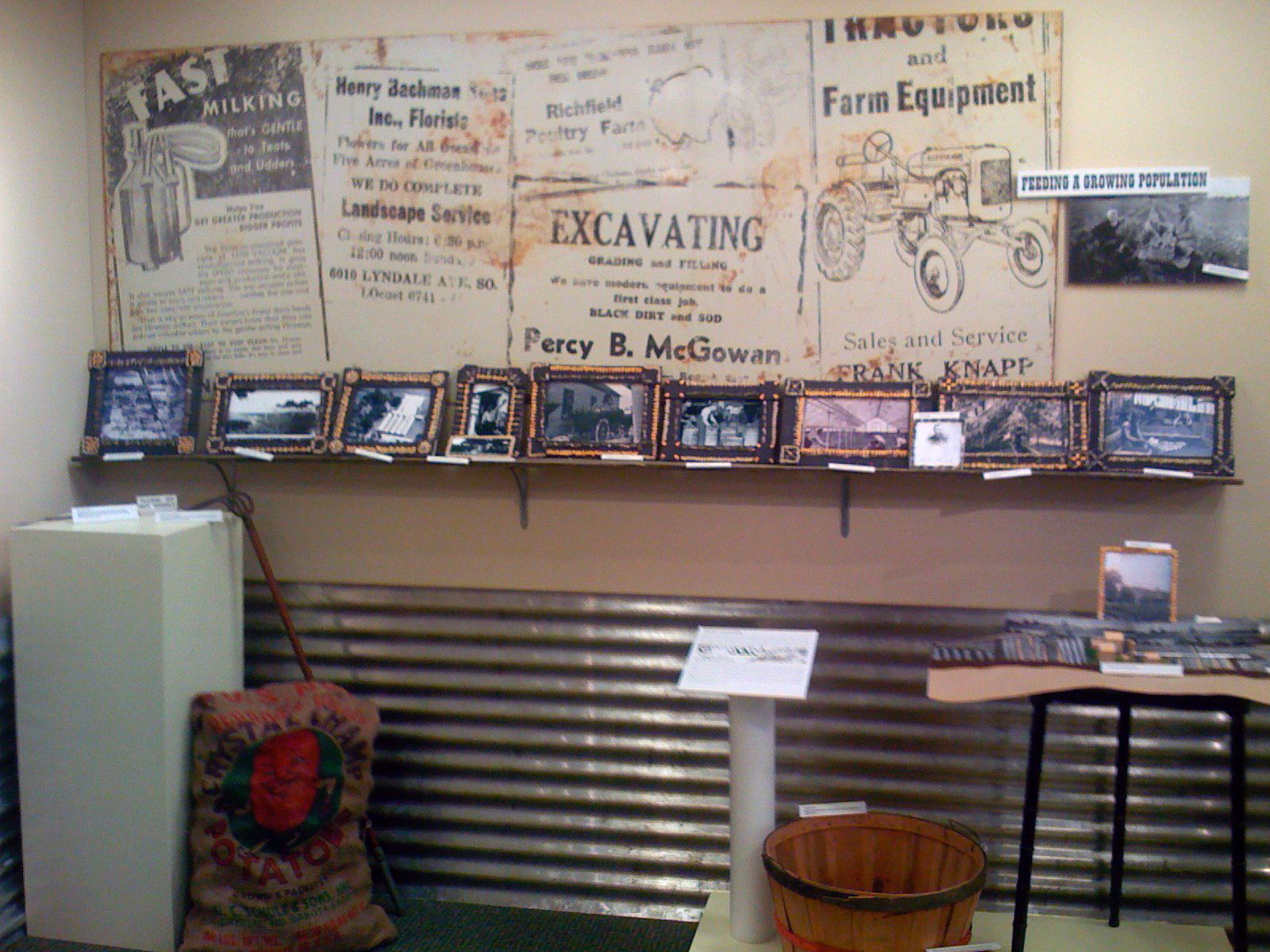
Exhibit

== See also ==
- List of museums in Minnesota
