= Richfield High School (Minnesota) =

Coordinates: 44°52′29.4″N 93°17′02.6″W

Richfield Senior High School
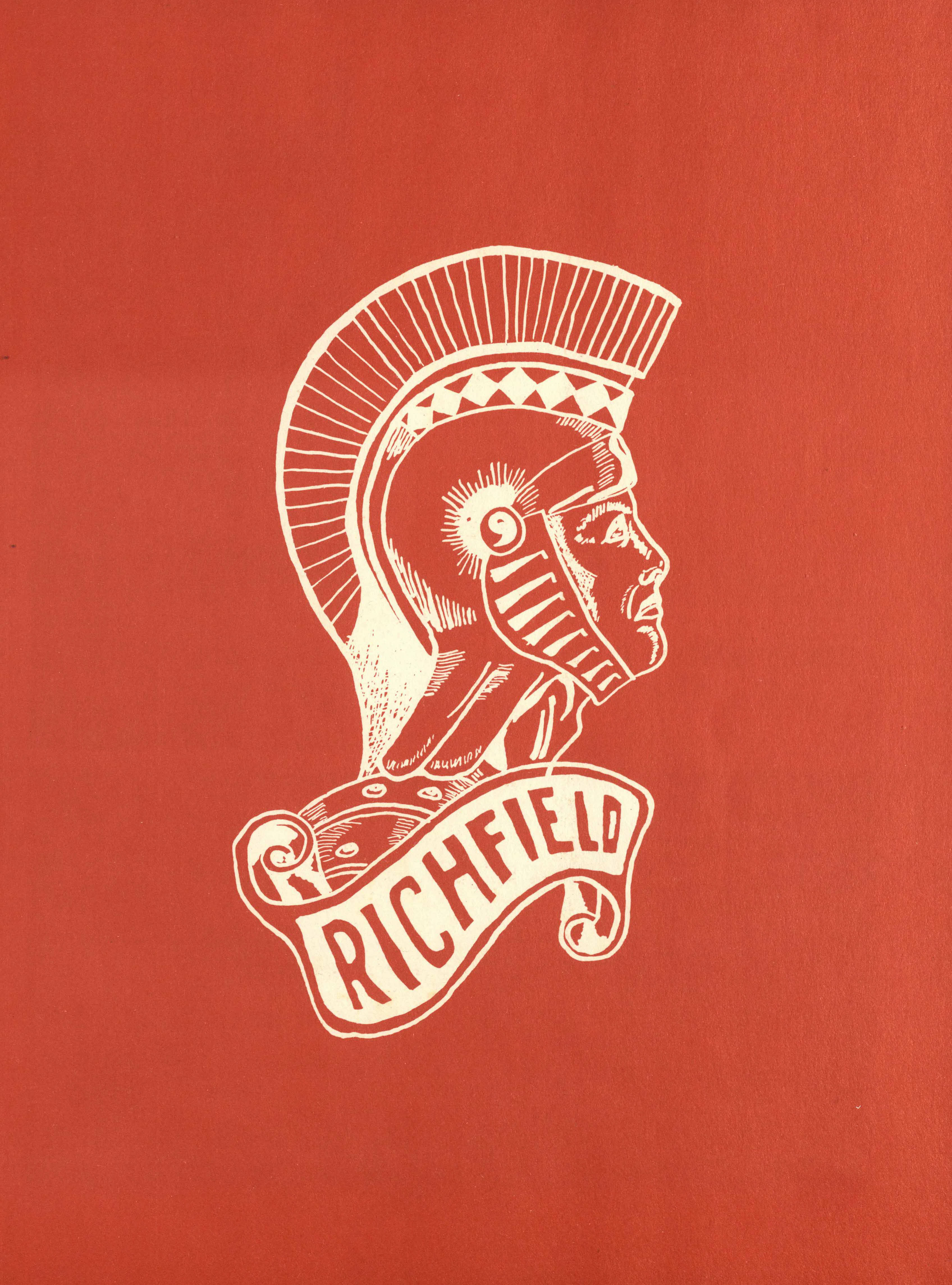

Location
- 7001 Harriet Ave S Richfield, Minnesota; United States

Information
- Type: Public
- Established: 1954
- Principal: Stacy Theien-Collins
- Staff: 90.27 (FTE)
- Enrollment: 1,235 (2023-2024)
- Student to teacher ratio: 13.68
- Colors: Spartan Red and White
- Mascot: Spartan
- Website: rhs.richfieldschools.org

Richfield High School is the only public traditional high school in Richfield, Minnesota, United States. The school serves grades 9-12 for the Richfield Public Schools. It was named to the 2023 AP School Honor Roll, which recognizes schools with AP programs that are delivering results and broadening access for students. Richfield High School was also awarded a place on the "Best Public High Schools 2023-24" list by U.S. News & World Report.

Athletics: Richfield High School is a member of the Tri-Metro Conference in the Minnesota State High School League.

State championships
Season	Sport	Number of championships	Year
Fall	Soccer, boys'	1	1975
Fall	Football, boys'	1	1963
Winter	Dance team, girls'	3	1975, 1987, 1988
Winter	Debate	3	1973, 1974, 1981
Winter	Gymnastics, girls'	1	1975
Winter	Basketball, boys’	1	2020 (shared among 8 teams)
Spring	Golf, girls'	1	1991
Spring	Softball, girls'	1	1992
Spring	Baseball, boys'	4	1962, 1965, 1971, 1972
Total		16	

== Notable alumni ==
- Steve Christoff, NHL player
- Darby Hendrickson, NHL player
- Steven Lindgren, Minnesota State Senator from District 37
- Alice Mann, Minnesota State Senator from District 50
- Damian Rhodes, NHL player
