= Richfield Public Schools =

School district in Minnesota, United States

Address
- 401 W 70th Street Richfield, Hennepin County, Minnesota, 55423; United States

District information
- Grades: PreK-12
- Superintendent: Dr. Steven Unowsky
- Chair of the board: Eric Carter

Students and staff
- Students: 4,139
- Teachers: 292
- Staff: 603

Other information
- Website: www.richfieldschools.org

Richfield Public Schools, officially Independent School District #280, is the school district for Richfield, and a portion of neighboring Edina, Minnesota.

The district has four elementary schools – two neighborhood schools and two magnet schools. The neighborhood schools are Centennial Elementary (serving families east of Nicollet Avenue) and Sheridan Hills Elementary (serving families west of Nicollet Avenue). The magnet schools are Richfield Dual Language School and Richfield STEM Elementary.

The district has one middle school and one traditional high school, as well as an alternative learning program for students in grades 9-12 (the Richfield College Experience Program).

The Richfield Public School District is also home to Richfield Community Education, which provides preschool programs, early childhood family and special education, adult enrichment and youth programming.

The school district is governed by a six-member board of education. Members of the Richfield Public School District Board of Education set the vision and goals for the district, monitor progress and ensure accountability. Every decision they make is centered on what is best for students and incorporates student input throughout the process—from listening sessions with students to the inclusion of student board representatives. Student voice is reflected in the school board's policies, each of which is reviewed at least every five years to ensure continued alignment with the vision of the board and the needs of students, staff and families. The 2021-26 strategic plan, Richfield Realized, guides the district.

== Schools ==
- Richfield Senior High School (grades 9-12)
- Richfield Dual Language School (grades PreK-5)
- Richfield STEM Elementary School (grades PreK-5)
- Sheridan Hills Elementary School (grades PreK-5)
- Centennial Elementary School (grades PreK-5)
- Richfield Dual Language School (grades PreK-5)
- Richfield College Experience Program (grades 9-12)
- Richfield Middle School (grades 6-8)

== See also ==
- List of school districts in Minnesota
