= Darby Hendrickson =

American ice hockey player (born 1972)

- Born: August 28, 1972 (age 54) Richfield, Minnesota, U.S.
- Height: 6 ft 0 in (183 cm)
- Weight: 195 lb (88 kg; 13 st 13 lb)
- Position: Center
- Shot: Left
- Played for: Toronto Maple Leafs; New York Islanders; Vancouver Canucks; Minnesota Wild; Colorado Avalanche
- National team: United States
- NHL draft: 73rd overall, 1990; Toronto Maple Leafs
- Playing career: 1993–2007
Medal record
Representing United States
Ice hockey
World Championships
| Bronze medal – third place | 1996 | Vienna |

Darby Joseph Hendrickson (born August 28, 1972) is an American former professional ice hockey center. He played in the NHL with the Toronto Maple Leafs, New York Islanders, Vancouver Canucks, Minnesota Wild and the Colorado Avalanche, and is a former assistant coach with the Minnesota Wild for 14 seasons. Currently, Hendrickson is an assistant coach with the Nashville Predators.

== Playing career ==
He was drafted in the fourth round, 73rd overall, by the Toronto Maple Leafs in the 1990 NHL entry draft. After being named Minnesota Mr. Hockey in 1991 for his play at Richfield Senior High School, Hendrickson entered the University of Minnesota. He played for two seasons with the Golden Gophers before joining Toronto's American Hockey League affiliate, the St. John's Maple Leafs, in the 1993–94 season. After playing on the United States hockey team in the 1994 Winter Olympics, he made his NHL debut with Toronto during the 1994 Stanley Cup Playoffs, appearing in two games.

Other than a brief move to the New York Islanders during the 1995–96 season, Hendrickson remained with the Maple Leafs until midway through the 1998–99 season, when he was traded to the Vancouver Canucks in exchange for Chris McAllister on February 16, 1999. The Canucks left him unprotected in the 2000 NHL Expansion Draft, and he was selected by the Minnesota Wild. After three-plus seasons with the Wild, Hendrickson was traded during the 2003–04 season on February 25, 2004, along with an 8th round draft pick (Brandon Yip), to the Colorado Avalanche in exchange for a fourth round pick, which in turn was traded to the Ottawa Senators (who used the pick to select Cody Bass) in exchange for center Todd White.

During 2004–05 NHL lockout Hendrickson, as a friend of Sergei Zholtok, played seven games in Latvian hockey league club HK Riga 2000, but after the death of Zholtok he left the club. Hendrickson spent two seasons from 2005–07 playing for EC Salzburg in the Austrian EBEL before retiring.

Hendrickson worked as a Wild commentator for FSN North, and on March 27, 2008, he was named Northwest Divisional Representative by the NHLPA.

== Personal life ==
His son, Beckett, was drafted in the fourth round, 124th overall, by the Boston Bruins in the 2023 NHL entry draft.

== Career statistics ==
=== Regular season and playoffs ===
| | | | Regular season | | | | | Playoffs |
| Season | Team | League | GP | G | A | Pts | PIM | GP | G | A | Pts | PIM |
|---|---|---|---|---|---|---|---|---|---|---|---|---|
| 1987–88 | Richfield High School | HS-MN | 22 | 12 | 9 | 21 | 10 | — | — | — | — | — |
| 1988–89 | Richfield High School | HS-MN | 22 | 22 | 20 | 42 | 12 | — | — | — | — | — |
| 1989–90 | Richfield High School | HS-MN | 24 | 23 | 27 | 50 | 49 | — | — | — | — | — |
| 1990–91 | Richfield High School | HS-MN | 27 | 32 | 29 | 61 | — | — | — | — | — | — |
| 1991–92 | University of Minnesota | WCHA | 44 | 25 | 30 | 55 | 63 | — | — | — | — | — |
| 1992–93 | University of Minnesota | WCHA | 31 | 12 | 15 | 27 | 35 | — | — | — | — | — |
| 1993–94 | United States | Intl | 59 | 12 | 16 | 28 | 30 | — | — | — | — | — |
| 1993–94 | St. John's Maple Leafs | AHL | 6 | 4 | 1 | 5 | 4 | 3 | 1 | 1 | 2 | 0 |
| 1993–94 | Toronto Maple Leafs | NHL | — | — | — | — | — | 2 | 0 | 0 | 0 | 0 |
| 1994–95 | St. John's Maple Leafs | AHL | 59 | 16 | 20 | 36 | 48 | — | — | — | — | — |
| 1994–95 | Toronto Maple Leafs | NHL | 8 | 0 | 1 | 1 | 4 | — | — | — | — | — |
| 1995–96 | Toronto Maple Leafs | NHL | 46 | 6 | 6 | 12 | 47 | — | — | — | — | — |
| 1995–96 | New York Islanders | NHL | 16 | 1 | 4 | 5 | 33 | — | — | — | — | — |
| 1996–97 | St. John's Maple Leafs | AHL | 12 | 5 | 4 | 9 | 21 | — | — | — | — | — |
| 1996–97 | Toronto Maple Leafs | NHL | 64 | 11 | 6 | 17 | 47 | — | — | — | — | — |
| 1997–98 | Toronto Maple Leafs | NHL | 80 | 8 | 4 | 12 | 67 | — | — | — | — | — |
| 1998–99 | Toronto Maple Leafs | NHL | 35 | 2 | 3 | 5 | 30 | — | — | — | — | — |
| 1998–99 | Vancouver Canucks | NHL | 27 | 2 | 2 | 4 | 22 | — | — | — | — | — |
| 1999–2000 | Syracuse Crunch | AHL | 20 | 5 | 8 | 13 | 16 | — | — | — | — | — |
| 1999–2000 | Vancouver Canucks | NHL | 40 | 5 | 4 | 9 | 14 | — | — | — | — | — |
| 2000–01 | Minnesota Wild | NHL | 72 | 18 | 11 | 29 | 36 | — | — | — | — | — |
| 2001–02 | Minnesota Wild | NHL | 68 | 9 | 15 | 24 | 50 | — | — | — | — | — |
| 2002–03 | Minnesota Wild | NHL | 28 | 1 | 5 | 6 | 8 | 17 | 2 | 3 | 5 | 4 |
| 2003–04 | Houston Aeros | AHL | 31 | 4 | 5 | 9 | 19 | — | — | — | — | — |
| 2003–04 | Minnesota Wild | NHL | 14 | 1 | 0 | 1 | 6 | — | — | — | — | — |
| 2003–04 | Colorado Avalanche | NHL | 20 | 1 | 3 | 4 | 6 | 6 | 1 | 0 | 1 | 2 |
| 2004–05 | HK Rīga 2000 | LVA | 1 | 1 | 1 | 2 | 0 | — | — | — | — | — |
| 2004–05 | HK Rīga 2000 | BLR | 6 | 2 | 2 | 4 | 26 | — | — | — | — | — |
| 2005–06 | EC Salzburg | AUT | 31 | 9 | 10 | 19 | 12 | — | — | — | — | — |
| 2006–07 | EC Salzburg | AUT | 56 | 10 | 28 | 38 | 54 | 7 | 0 | 1 | 1 | 12 |
| NHL totals | | | 518 | 65 | 64 | 129 | 370 | 25 | 3 | 3 | 6 | 6 |

=== International ===
| Year | Team | Event | Result | GP | G | A | Pts | PIM |
|---|---|---|---|---|---|---|---|---|
| 1994 | United States | OG | 8th | 8 | 0 | 0 | 0 | 6 |
| 1996 | United States | WC | 3rd place, bronze medalist(s) | 8 | 1 | 1 | 2 | 4 |
| 1997 | United States | WC | 6th | 8 | 0 | 1 | 1 | 8 |
| 1998 | United States | WC | 12th | 6 | 1 | 0 | 1 | 0 |
| 1999 | United States | WC | 6th | 6 | 0 | 2 | 2 | 0 |
| 2000 | United States | WC | 5th | 7 | 1 | 1 | 2 | 12 |
| 2001 | United States | WC | 4th | 9 | 3 | 3 | 6 | 4 |
| Senior totals | | | | 52 | 6 | 8 | 14 | 34 |

== Awards and honors ==
| Award | Year |
|---|---|
| All-WCHA Rookie Team | 1991–92 |

Sporting positions
| Preceded by Brad Bombardir | Minnesota Wild team captain March/April 2001 | Succeeded by Jim Dowd |
Awards and achievements
| Preceded by Joe Dziedzic | Minnesota Mr. Hockey; 1990–91 season | Succeeded by Brian Bonin |
| Preceded by Tony Szabo | WCHA Rookie of the Year; 1991–92 | Succeeded by Jim Carey |
