= Minnesota Independence College and Community =

School in Richfield, Minnesota

Coordinates: 44°52′1.5″N 93°18′11″W

Minnesota Independence College and Community (MICC)
- Motto: Learn Skills. Experience Life.
- Type: Nonprofit program
- Established: 1996
- President: Amy Gudmestad (Chief Executive Officer)
- Students: 200
- Location: Richfield, Minnesota, United States
- Nickname: MICC
- Mascot: CeCe Bulldog
- Website: www.micc.org

Minnesota Independence College and Community (MICC) provides education and training for autistic and neurodivergent adults. MICC is in located in Richfield, Minnesota, United States.

== History ==
Minnesota Independence College and Community, previously known as Minnesota Life College, is a non-profit organization that was founded in 1996 by Bev and Roe Hatlen, co-founders of Old Country Buffet. One of the Hatlen's children had a developmental disability, and upon graduation of high school had only a handful of schools, all outside of Minnesota to choose from. Because of this, the Hatlens decided to start a post-secondary school for young adults with learning disabilities. Minnesota Life College changed their name on August 1, 2018 to Minnesota Independence College and Community.

== Program ==
Since 1996, MICC has provides education and training for autistic and neurodivergent adults with the goal of helping them live independently and work purposefully.

MICC offers four programs:

College program: A 3-year College program for adults 18 to 30 years of age. Participants live in furnished on-campus apartments, earn career certificates, and go on a variety of explorations and retreats. After graduation, participants may choose to join MICC’s Community program for ongoing individualized living and employment guidance, as well as access to social events, clubs, electives and experiences.

Career Confidence program: A program for autistic and neurodivergent adults with some work experience, with the goal of building confidence and feeling more prepared for work.

Connect program: A program meant to build social confidence and communication skills.

Summer program: A weeklong program for autistic and neurodivergent teens and young adults ages 15 to 30.

== Annual Gala ==
In 2004, the school held its first benefit to raise money for the students and program. Since then, once a year, MICC holds a benefit to raise money for the program. The Gala raises money to help with scholarships for families in need of assistance, as well as support program costs. It consists of both a silent and live auction, accompanied by a formal sit down meal and various speakers, including students in the program.

== See also ==
- Intellectual disability and higher education in the United States
