= Vocational Independence Program =

School in New York, United States

The Vocational Independence Program (VIP) at New York Institute of Technology was one of only 10 postsecondary schools in the United States that is known by the U.S. Department of Education as a Comprehensive Transition and Postsecondary (CTP) program for students with an intellectual disability. The VIP program originally offered a summer program called the Introduction to Independence (I To I) which qualified VIP as an interconnected program aimed at people ages 16–22 with special needs and focused on job training and independent living skills. There was a 4th year option at VIP. It was founded by the New York Institute of Technology in 1987.

People ages 23 and up may still attend VIP. However, they are ineligible to attend the summer program as the Introduction to Independence is a summer work-study-recreation program for students ages 16 to 22 who have moderate to severe learning differences. The IQ scores of VIP students are 70–143. At VIP, most students come directly from high school and most have been in special education programs. On June 2, 2020, NYIT announced the program would be discontinued as a result of the ongoing COVID-19 pandemic.
