= Richfield, Minnesota =

City in Minnesota, United States

- City
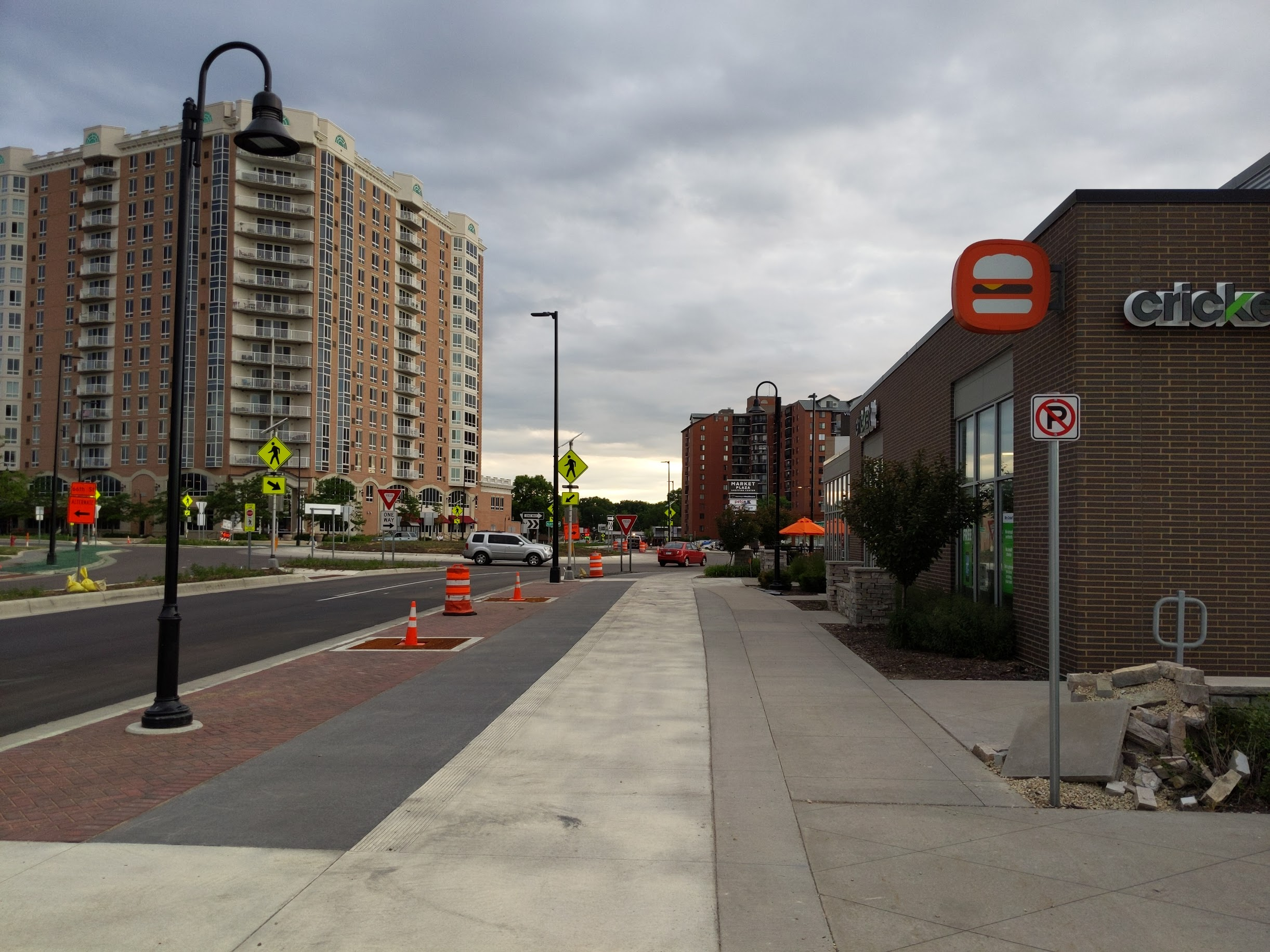
- Corner of 66th St and Lyndale Avenue in downtown Richfield

- Logo
- Motto: The Urban Hometown
- Location of Richfield within Hennepin County, Minnesota

- Location within Minnesota Location within the United States Location within North America
- Coordinates: 44°52′55″N 93°16′06″W
- Country: United States
- State: Minnesota
- County: Hennepin
- Founded: 1850s
- Incorporated: 1908

Government
  - Type: Council-manager government
  - Mayor: Mary Supple

Area
  - City: 6.92 sq mi (17.91 km^{2})
  - Land: 6.78 sq mi (17.55 km^{2})
  - Water: 0.14 sq mi (0.35 km^{2}) 2.00%
- Elevation: 840 ft (256 m)

Population (2020)
  - City: 36,994
  - Estimate (2025): 36,593
  - Density: 5,458/sq mi (2,107.4/km^{2})
  - Metro: 3,693,927 (US: 16th)
- Time zone: UTC-6 (Central)
  - Summer (DST): UTC-5 (CDT)
- ZIP code: 55423
- Area code: 612
- FIPS code: 27-54214
- GNIS feature ID: 0650061
- Website: richfieldmn.gov

Richfield is a city in Hennepin County, Minnesota. An inner-ring suburb of Minneapolis, Richfield is bordered by Minneapolis to the north, Minneapolis–Saint Paul International Airport and Fort Snelling to the east, Bloomington to the south, and Edina to the west. The population was 36,994 at the 2020 census.

Best Buy, the U.S.'s largest electronics retailer, is headquartered in Richfield.

== History ==
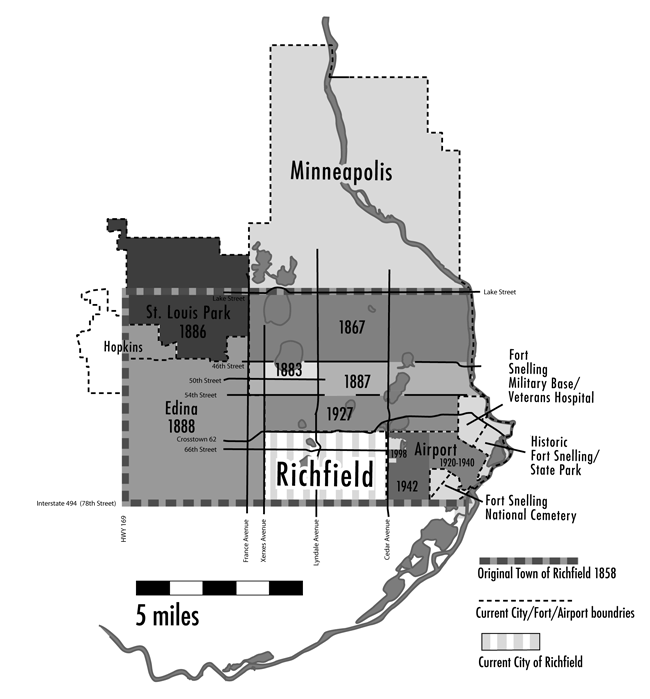
Map showing land annexations and Richfield's original borders as a town in 1854 and present day borders as a city

In the 1820s, some small settlements developed around Fort Snelling. By the late 1830s, the fortress served as a destination for newcomers—lumbermen, missionaries, farmers, traders and travelers—migrating to the borderlands people were now calling "Minisota". Minnesotan Franklin Steele reached the area in 1837 and worked as a sutler, selling goods to soldiers.

Fort Snelling's garrison made up the bulk of the area's population, along with Henry Sibley and Alexander Faribault's 75-person American Fur Company operation. Other small settlements of traders, farmers, missionaries and refugees began to develop outside the fort, some with permission, some without. These residents built communities on land that became known as Richfield.

Minnesota's oldest suburb claim

Richfield was one of the earliest postwar suburbs in the Twin Cities to be populated by veterans returning from World War II, but its claim to be Minnesota's oldest suburb date to the land's connection to Fort Snelling in the 1820s. The term "suburb" is from the Latin suburbium, "the land outside a walled city". Much of the land that comprised the Township of Richfield and today's City of Richfield included the Fort Snelling military reservation, which included Camp Coldwater.

=== Richfield Township is established ===
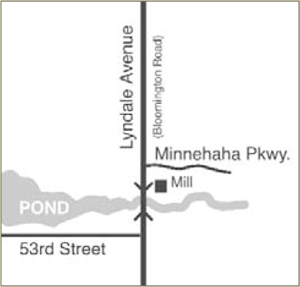
Map showing location of the Richland Mill

One of the first settlers to the area was Riley Bartholomew, a former general in the Ohio Militia. He later became a Richfield justice of the peace and a Minnesota state senator. Bartholomew built a house on Wood Lake's eastern shore in 1852, and the restored Riley Lucas Bartholomew House is listed on the National Register of Historic Places. Today, the Richfield Historical Society maintains the house and the site.

The Harmony post office, south of the Richland Mill on Lyndale Avenue, opened in 1854. Postmaster James Dunsmoor named the mail center after his hometown in Maine. Richfield farmers looked on the metropolis to its north as their marketing target. They helped supply its restaurants, hotels, grocers and citizens with fresh produce, with enough left over to ship by railroad to other cities.

On May 11, 1858, Congress approved the Territory of Minnesota as the 32nd state to join the union. That day, local citizens met in a schoolhouse at present-day 53rd and Lyndale to form a municipal government. At that meeting, those who previously said they lived in Harmony or Richland Mills chose the name Richfield for their community.

Settlers from Maine made up 35% of U.S.-born adults 18 or older in 1860 Richfield. New York immigrants were 21%. Immigrants from Ireland, numbering 58, represented half of the 119 adults from other nations. Just three of Richfield's citizens had been born in Minnesota.

Richfield's fields proved bountiful for the settlers. Early crops included corn, wheat and oats. Wheat immediately became the cash crop, sold in the area's first major market, St. Paul. Those in southern Hennepin County found it more profitable to haul their wheat crop to St. Paul than to the St. Anthony Falls district. This was before "King Wheat" and Minneapolis's evolution into a milling center.

Market gardening

Minneapolis became a favorite trading point for market gardeners in 1897 with the building of the modern, covered Second Street Market just two blocks west of Hennepin Avenue and Bridge Square. The market featured a massive platform for gardeners, including Richfield's sizable contingent, to unload and display produce. The new system freed streets from traffic snarls by allowing each person to unhitch and put up their horses, while their wagon was backed into an assigned space. Wholesale customers could then bring their teams to the platform and negotiate prices when the starting bell sounded.

=== Boundary changes ===
Today's boundaries differ markedly from those the Hennepin County Board of Commissioners set forth on April 10, 1858, when it established the towns of Richfield, Minneapolis, Bloomington and Eden Prairie. Richfield's boundaries included about 63 square miles. Richfield originally ranged to Minneapolis's Lake Street on the north, to what is now Highway 169 on the west, to Bloomington on the south, and to Fort Snelling and the Minnesota and Mississippi rivers on the east.

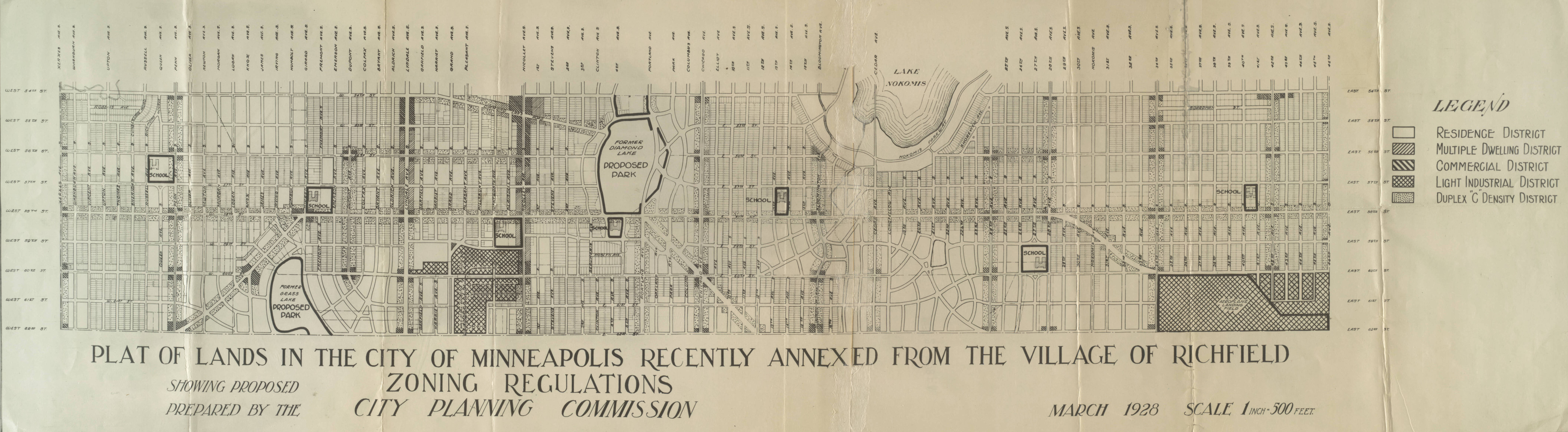
Plat of Lands in the City of Minneapolis Annexed from the Village of Richfield in 1927.

Parts of Richfield were later lost to neighboring towns or villages through annexation. An 1886 partition of Richfield created the village of St. Louis Park, and a division in 1889 produced the village of Edina. Minneapolis absorbed sizeable portions of Richfield through legislative action or annexations in 1867, 1883, 1887 and 1927. The growth of Minneapolis-Saint Paul International Airport during the last half of the 20th century and additions of land to the Fort Snelling compound meant further reductions.

=== 20th century ===
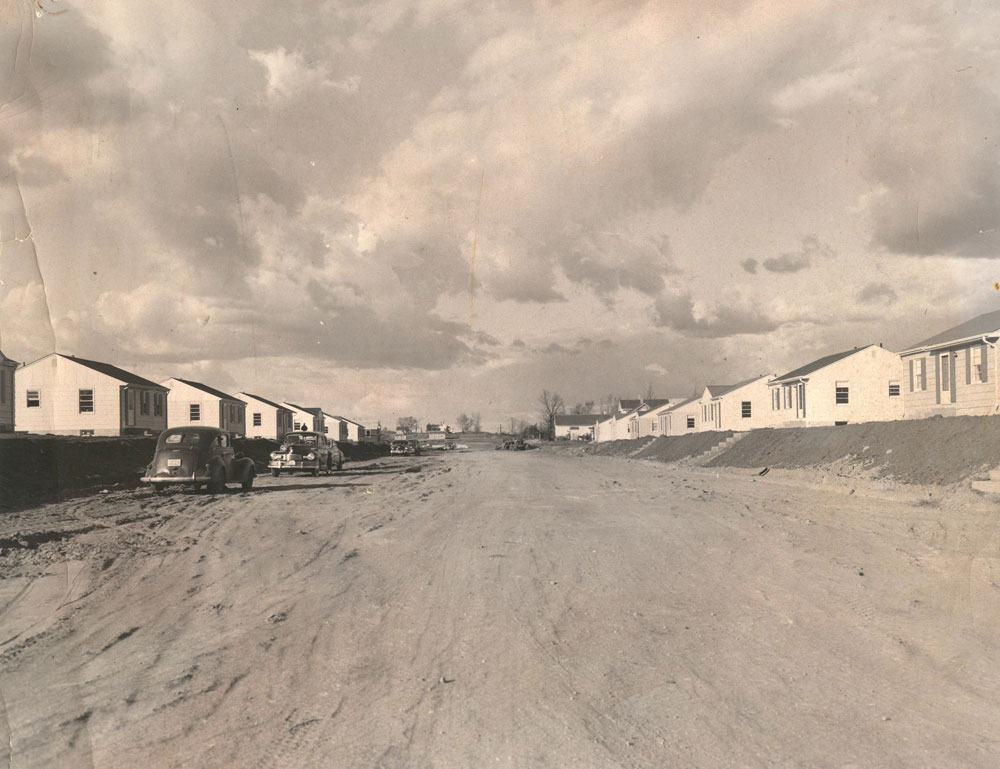
Housing development along Washburn Avenue, circa 1950

In 1908, Richfield became a village. From 1908 until 1950, Richfield's local government consisted of a president, three trustees, and a city clerk. On November 7, 1950, residents voted for a city-manager form of government, meaning the city had a mayor, four council members, and a city manager. This is still Richfield's form of government. The first mayor was Clarence Christian, who began serving in 1951, but served as president under the old format dating back to 1948. By the late 1940s, the city's population started increasing rapidly as farmland was sold to developers building homes for veterans returning from World War II. The Richfield Chamber of Commerce was formed in 1955 and has been deeply involved in the community's development and redevelopment.

Over the years, populations of all nearby communities increased and after World War II, Richfield flourished with commuters to Twin Cities jobs. As of 2019, Richfield has a population of about 35,000, who live within seven square miles of neighborhoods, parks, and shops.

== Geography ==
According to the United States Census Bureau, the city has an area of 7.01 square miles (18.16 km^{2}), of which 6.87 square miles (17.79 km^{2}) is land and 0.14 square miles (0.36 km^{2}) is water.

Interstates 35W and 494 and Minnesota State Highways 62 and 77 are four of the main routes in the city. Other main routes include 66th Street.

The majority of the 10,000 single-family homes were constructed in the 1950s, and the 5,000 apartments date from the 1960s and early 1970s. The Richfield Rediscovered Housing Program has established an environment of change in the community as it encourages home remodeling, expansion, and reconstruction. The program is gradually changing the face of Richfield's residential neighborhoods, upgrading them from small, post-WWII styles to larger homes.

Richfield Land Use Areas (2005)
Land Use	Specific	Acres	Percent
Total City Area		4569.4	100
Streets and Highways		1249.6	27.3
Net Land Use Area		3319.8	72.7
Total Residential	Total Residential Area	2396.9	52.4
Total Residential	Single Family	2170.8	47.5
Total Residential	Two Family	35.0	0.8
Total Residential	Town Housing	3.4	0.07
Total Residential	Multi-family	182.2	4.0
Total Residential	Care housing	5.5	0.1
Total Non-Residential	Total Non-Residential Area	922.3	20.2
Total Non-Residential	Commercial	205.0	4.5
Total Non-Residential	Public	16.8	0.4
Total Non-Residential	Quasi Public	40.4	0.9
Total Non-Residential	Church	56.6	1.2
Total Non-Residential	School	109.2	2.4
Total Non-Residential	Park	468.6	10.3
Total Non-Residential	Railroad	11.8	0.3
Total Non-Residential	Vacant	13.9	0.3

== Economy ==
=== Business ===
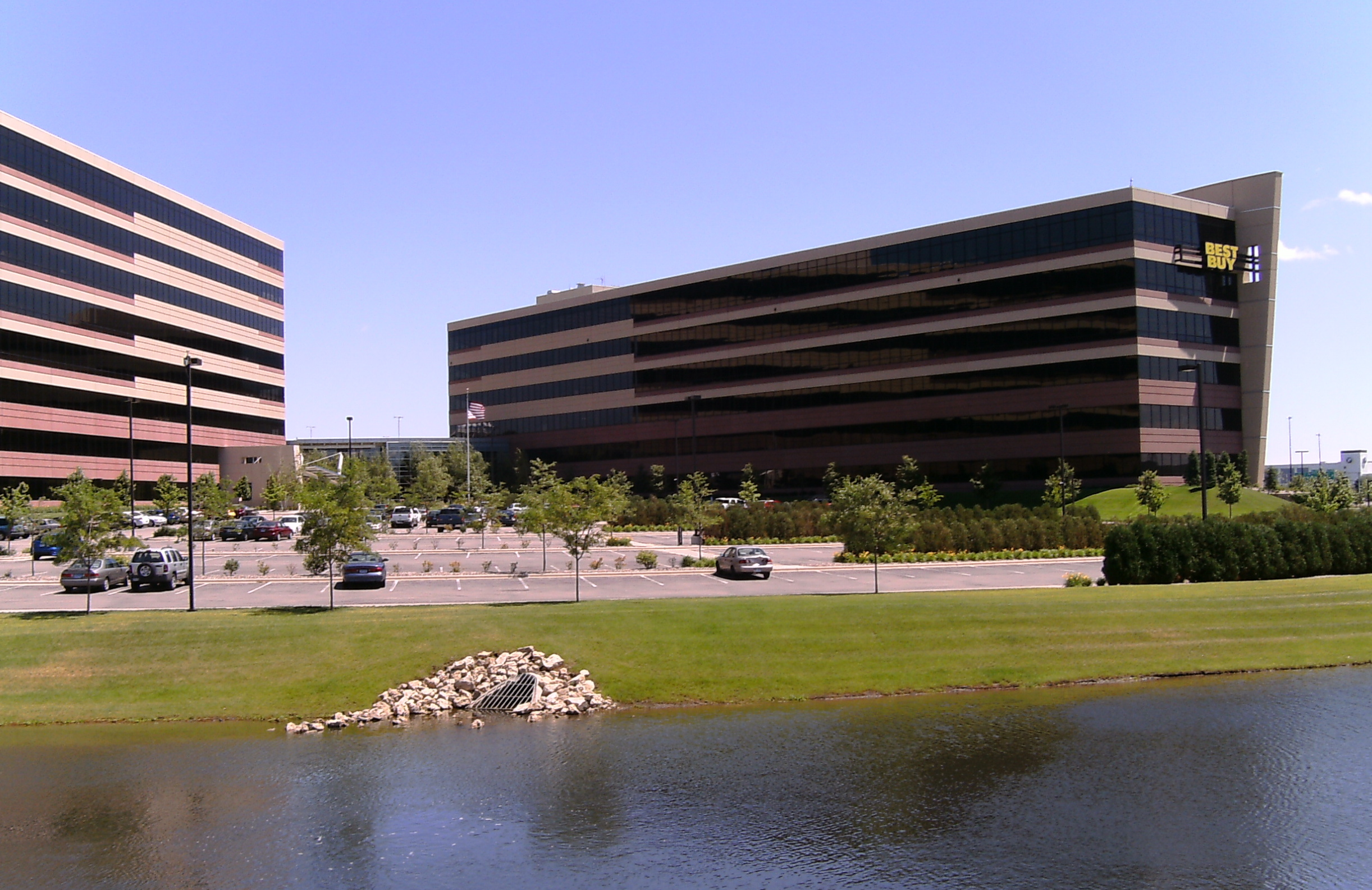
Richfield is home to the corporate campus of Best Buy

Best Buy Company, Inc. moved its corporate headquarters to Richfield in 2003, becoming its largest employer. Public subsidies of almost $60 million were spent to attract the corporate campus including spending $48 million to purchase and demolish over 100 homes and 3 car dealerships within the city just north of I-494. Tax increment financing was used to fund other infrastructure. The use of eminent domain for a private business was controversial and resulted in lawsuits.

From the first quarter of 2001 to the first quarter of 2003, net job growth equaled 2,444 – the second highest in the metropolitan area. Additionally, total employment in Richfield jumped from 10,090 to nearly 15,000 between 1995 and 2005.

In 2007, Cedar Point Commons opened in Richfield at Cedar Avenue and 66th Street, adjacent to Minneapolis–Saint Paul International Airport. Target and The Home Depot serve as its anchor tenants.

=== Top employers ===
According to the city's 2023 Comprehensive Annual Financial Report, the top employers in the city are:

#	Employer	# of Employees
1	Best Buy (HQ)	5,300
2	US Bank	1,350
3	Richfield Public Schools	1,057
4	Target	350
5	City of Richfield	327
6	Fraser	299
7	Headway Emotional Health Services	250
9	Menard, Inc.	200
9	Weis Builders	100
10	Pizza Lucé	60

== Education ==
Richfield has public schools, private schools, alternative education programs, and post-secondary options.

=== Public schools ===
The local school district, Richfield Public Schools (officially Independent School District #280), serves about 4,200 students in Richfield and part of Edina in grades K-12. Richfield schools are divided into elementary schools, middle schools, and high schools.

Four elementary schools serve primary students in grades K-5: Centennial Elementary; Sheridan Elementary; R-STEM Elementary, which focuses its curriculum on science, technology, engineering, and math; and RDLS Elementary, a dual language school that teaches students in both English and Spanish.

Students in grades 6-8 attend Richfield Middle School. Richfield High School serves approximately 1400 students in grades 9–12.

The South Education Center is in the 7400 block of South Penn Avenue. It serves pre-K through "Transition" age.

In addition to Richfield Public Schools, public charter schools also serve residents, including Seven Hills Preparatory Academy, Partnership Academy, and SciTech Academy.

=== Private schools ===
- Academy of Holy Angels, a Catholic, co-educational high school that serves over 800 students in grades 9-12
- Blessed Trinity Catholic School

=== Post-secondary ===
- Minnesota Independence College and Community

== Recreation ==
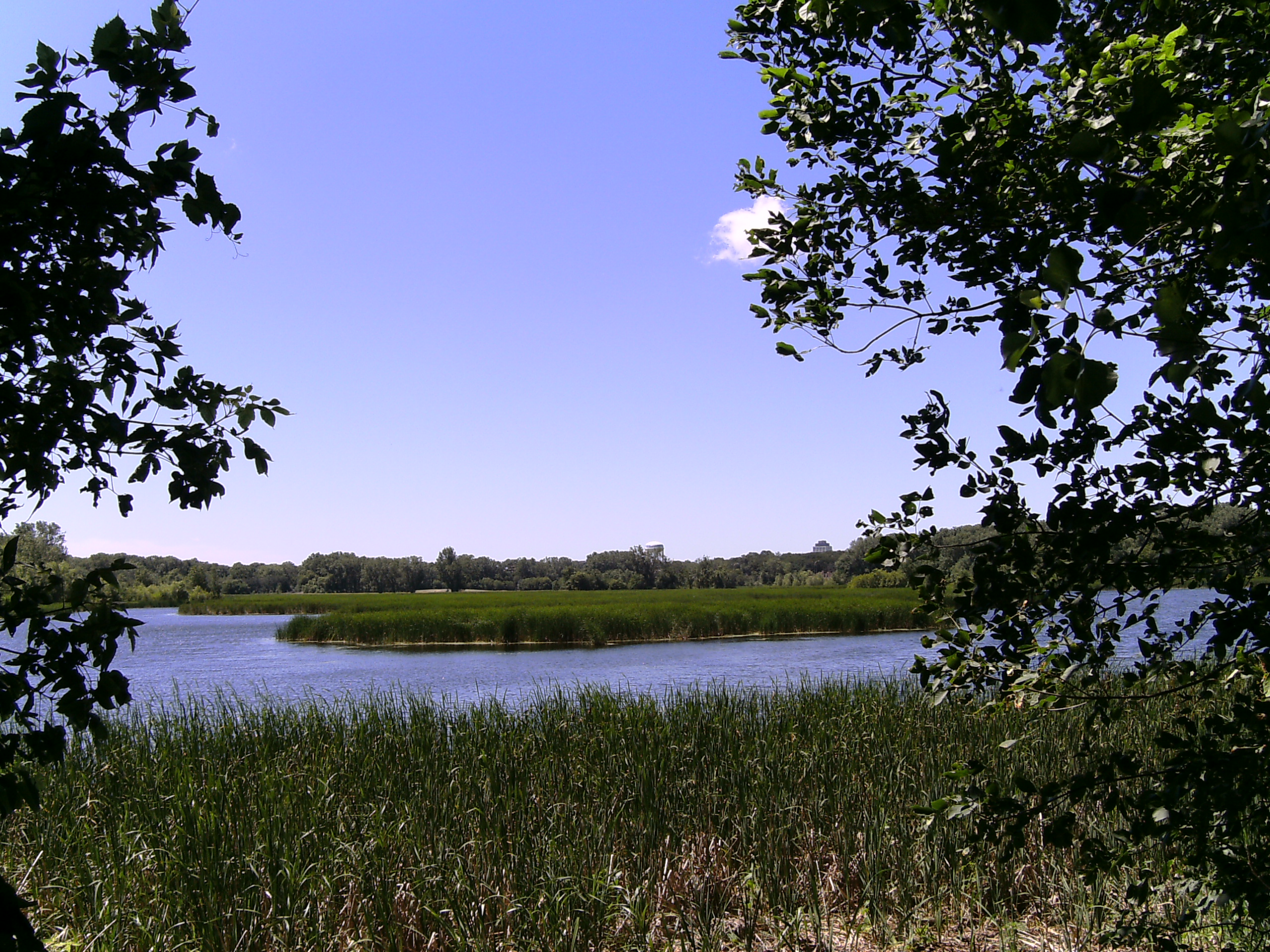
Wood Lake Nature Center

Richfield has more than 450 acres (1.8 km^{2}) of parkland, 23 neighborhood parks, and a nature preserve. Wood Lake Nature Center is a 150-acre (0.6 km^{2}) park operated by the city that features wetlands, walking paths and an interpretive center. When the Nature Center opened in 1971, it was one of the nation's first urban nature centers. It is home to more than 200 different kinds of birds and 30 mammals.

Richfield's Ice Arena has two full-size indoor skating rinks. Hockey games, figure skating, broom ball games, open skating, and community events all take place there. Near the ice arena is Richfield's outdoor pool. Renovated in 2003, it features a 50-meter competitive pool, wading pool, and a 28-foot (9 m) double waterslide.

2017-2019 brought a major overhaul of 66th street to improve the look of the city and increase recreation opportunities, with new, dedicated bike and walking lanes for pedestrians.

== Demographics ==
Historical population
Census	Pop.	Note	%±
1860	866		—
1870	930		7.4%
1880	1,501		61.4%
1890	1,324		−11.8%
1900	1,537		16.1%
1910	2,673		73.9%
1920	2,411		−9.8%
1930	1,301		−46.0%
1940	3,778		190.4%
1950	17,502		363.3%
1960	42,523		143.0%
1970	47,231		11.1%
1980	37,851		−19.9%
1990	35,710		−5.7%
2000	34,439		−3.6%
2010	35,228		2.3%
2020	36,994		5.0%
2025 (est.)	36,593		−1.1%
U.S. Decennial Census (Note: Population figures for 1930 and 1940 were corrected in the 1950 census by excluding the Fort Snelling count.); 2020 Census

=== Racial and ethnic composition ===
Richfield city, Minnesota – Racial and ethnic composition Note: the US Census treats Hispanic/Latino as an ethnic category. This table excludes Latinos from the racial categories and assigns them to a separate category. Hispanics/Latinos may be of any race.
Race / Ethnicity (NH = Non-Hispanic)	Pop 2000	Pop 2010	Pop 2020	% 2000	% 2010	% 2020
White alone (NH)	27,125	22,260	21,838	78.76%	63.19%	59.03%
Black or African American alone (NH)	2,257	3,152	3,591	6.55%	8.95%	9.71%
Native American or Alaska Native alone (NH)	212	225	203	0.62%	0.64%	0.55%
Asian alone (NH)	1,812	2,150	2,446	5.26%	6.10%	6.61%
Native Hawaiian or Pacific Islander alone (NH)	13	17	17	0.04%	0.05%	0.05%
Other race alone (NH)	108	134	246	0.31%	0.38%	0.66%
Mixed race or Multiracial (NH)	754	854	1,832	2.19%	2.42%	4.95%
Hispanic or Latino (any race)	2,158	6,436	6,821	6.27%	18.27%	18.44%
Total	34,439	35,228	36,994	100.00%	100.00%	100.00%

=== 2020 census ===
As of the 2020 census, Richfield had a population of 36,994. The median age was 36.7 years. 19.9% of residents were under the age of 18 and 16.1% of residents were 65 years of age or older. For every 100 females there were 98.8 males, and for every 100 females age 18 and over there were 96.8 males age 18 and over.

100.0% of residents lived in urban areas, while 0.0% lived in rural areas.

There were 15,940 households in Richfield, of which 24.4% had children under the age of 18 living in them. Of all households, 39.3% were married-couple households, 22.1% were households with a male householder and no spouse or partner present, and 30.1% were households with a female householder and no spouse or partner present. About 36.1% of all households were made up of individuals and 14.0% had someone living alone who was 65 years of age or older.

There were 16,893 housing units, of which 5.6% were vacant. The homeowner vacancy rate was 0.5% and the rental vacancy rate was 9.0%.

Racial composition as of the 2020 census
Race	Number	Percent
White	22,575	61.0%
Black or African American	3,638	9.8%
American Indian and Alaska Native	503	1.4%
Asian	2,460	6.6%
Native Hawaiian and Other Pacific Islander	20	0.1%
Some other race	4,429	12.0%
Two or more races	3,369	9.1%
Hispanic or Latino (of any race)	6,821	18.4%

=== 2010 census ===
As of the census of 2010, there were 35,228 people, 14,818 households, and 8,420 families living in the city. The population density was 5,127.8 inhabitants per square mile (1,979.9/km^{2}). There were 15,735 housing units at an average density of 2,290.4 per square mile (884.3/km^{2}). The racial makeup of the city was 69.8% White, 9.2% African American, 0.8% Native American, 6.1% Asian, 0.1% Pacific Islander, 10.4% from other races, and 3.5% from two or more races. Hispanic or Latino of any race were 18.3% of the population.

There were 14,818 households, of which 26.7% had children under the age of 18 living with them, 41.2% were married couples living together, 10.8% had a female householder with no husband present, 4.9% had a male householder with no wife present, and 43.2% were non-families. 34.3% of all households were made up of individuals, and 12.9% had someone living alone who was 65 years of age or older. The average household size was 2.35 and the average family size was 3.05.

The median age in the city was 36.2 years. 21.3% of residents were under the age of 18; 8.5% were between the ages of 18 and 24; 31.4% were from 25 to 44; 24.7% were from 45 to 64; and 14.2% were 65 years of age or older. The gender makeup of the city was 49.2% male and 50.8% female.

=== 2000 census ===
As of the census of 2000, there were 34,439 people, 15,073 households, and 8,727 families living in the city. The population density was 4,993.9 inhabitants per square mile (1,928.2/km^{2}). There were 15,357 housing units at an average density of 2,226.9 per square mile (859.8/km^{2}). The racial makeup of the city was 81.25% White, 6.65% African American, 0.72% Native American, 5.30% Asian, 0.04% Pacific Islander, 3.41% from other races, and 2.64% from two or more races. Hispanic or Latino of any race was 6.27% of the population.

There were 15,073 households, out of which 24.4% had children under the age of 18 living with them, 43.4% were married couples living together, 10.5% had a female householder with no husband present, and 42.1% were non-families. 33.7% of all households were made up of individuals, and 12.0% had someone living alone who was 65 years of age or older. The average household size was 2.25 and the average family size was 2.89.

In the city, the population was spread out, with 20.2% under the age of 18, 9.3% from 18 to 24, 33.4% from 25 to 44, 20.7% from 45 to 64, and 16.4% who were 65 years of age or older. The median age was 37 years. For every 100 females, there were 96.2 males. For every 100 females age 18 and over, there were 93.0 males.

The median income for a household in the city was $45,519, and the median income for a family was $56,434. Males had a median income of $38,417 versus $29,909 for females. The per capita income for the city was $24,709. About 3.9% of families and 6.3% of the population were below the poverty line, including 8.3% of those under age 18 and 3.8% of those age 65 or over.

== Politics ==
Richfield's mayor is Mary Supple, a retired Richfield Public School teacher. Supple would notably serve as mayor of Richfield when U.S. Immigrations and Customs Enforcement (ICE) officials conducted raids in the city in January 2026.

Former Richfield Mayor Maria Regan Gonzalez was the first Latina mayor in Minnesota history. Regan Gonzalez was a councilwoman in Ward 3 before being elected in 2018.

Richfield has five city council members: Sharon Christensen (Council At-Large), Walter Burk (Council Ward One), Sean Hayford Oleary (Council Ward Two), Rori A. Coleman-Woods (Council Ward Three), and Supple. At the state level, Richfield is represented State Senator Melissa Halvorson Wiklund and State Representative Michael Howard. The city is in Minnesota's 5th congressional district, represented by Ilhan Omar.

Presidential election results

Presidential elections resultsPrecinct General Election Results
Year	Republican	Democratic	Third parties
2024	25.1% 4,847	72.4% 13,977	2.5% 480
2020	24.9% 5,128	72.4% 14,931	2.7% 555
2016	26.2% 4,839	64.6% 11,924	9.2% 1,697
2012	31.6% 5,919	65.9% 12,364	2.9% 472
2008	33.5% 6,271	64.7% 12,112	1.8% 325
2004	38.0% 7,144	60.9% 11,442	1.1% 216
2000	37.9% 6,744	55.8% 9,924	6.3% 1,124
1996	33.8% 5,774	56.5% 9,657	9.7% 1,675
1992	31.7% 6,566	47.3% 9,790	27.0% 4,328
1988	45.3% 9,167	54.7% 11,049	0.0% 0
1984	49.7% 10,496	50.3% 10,616	0.0% 0
1980	40.6% 8,370	47.9% 8,370	11.5% 2,388
1976	47.2% 10,375	51.2% 11,239	1.6% 353
1972	57.0% 12,592	41.4% 9,140	1.6% 349
1968	43.9% 9,643	52.9% 11,615	3.2% 715
1964	40.1% 8,300	59.0% 11,950	0.9% 15
1960	55.8% 10,613	44.0% 8,375	0.2% 30

== Notable people ==
- Steve Christoff – member of the 1980 USA men's hockey team that won the gold medal in the Miracle on Ice
- Larry Fitzgerald – football player
- Donald F. Gleason – American physician and pathologist
- Jason Heinrichs – musician also known as Anomaly
- Darby Hendrickson – former NHL player
- Shirley A. Hokanson – Minnesota state legislator and social worker
- William G. Kirchner – Minnesota state legislator and banker
- Richard Kruger – CEO of Imperial Oil, former vice president of ExxonMobil
- Charles W. Lindberg – U.S. Marine
- Bill Mack – sculptor, artist
- Damian Rhodes – hockey player
- Chad Smith – Red Hot Chili Peppers drummer
- Will Steger – Arctic explorer and environmentalist
- Christopher Tjornhom – Minnesota state legislator
- Michael J Karels – Software Engineer
