= Damian Rhodes =

American ice hockey player

- Born: May 28, 1969 (age 57) Saint Paul, Minnesota, U.S.
- Height: 6 ft 0 in (183 cm)
- Weight: 200 lb (91 kg; 14 st 4 lb)
- Position: Goaltender
- Caught: Left
- Played for: Toronto Maple Leafs; Ottawa Senators; Atlanta Thrashers
- National team: United States
- NHL draft: 112th overall, 1987; Toronto Maple Leafs
- Playing career: 1990–2003

Damian Rhodes (born May 28, 1969) is an American former professional ice hockey goaltender. Rhodes played for the Toronto Maple Leafs, Ottawa Senators, and Atlanta Thrashers over eleven National Hockey League (NHL) seasons. He became the first player in Thrashers' franchise history when he was acquired in June 1999.

== Playing career ==
=== High school ===
Rhodes was born in St. Paul, Minnesota. While attending Richfield Senior High School, he played goaltender for the high school varsity team, the Richfield Spartans, during his junior and senior years. In his junior year, he and fellow goaltender Jon Lee shared goaltending duties on the team. One of the highlights of that year was an upset win against Richfield's arch-rival, the Edina Hornets. The Edina Hornets that year had only lost a single game during the regular season, and had beaten Richfield twice. In the Section 6 quarterfinal game against Edina, Rhodes stopped 36 of 39 shots on goal and Richfield won the upset game 4-3. In the following Section 6 final game against the Minnetonka Skippers, Rhodes only allowed a single goal in a 2-1 victory and gave the Richfield Spartans a berth in the Minnesota State High School Hockey Championship.

=== Toronto Maple Leafs ===
Rhodes was drafted by the Toronto Maple Leafs in the 6th round of the 1987 Entry Draft, 112th overall. After being drafted by the Maple Leafs, Rhodes attended Michigan Tech University, where he posted a 37-49-1 record over three seasons with the Huskies. While at Michigan Tech, Rhodes was credited with scoring a goal in a game on January 21, 1989.

Rhodes made his NHL debut on March 22, 1991 as he was called up from the Newmarket Saints of the American Hockey League near the end of the season. Rhodes showed some potential in a 3-1 victory over the Detroit Red Wings.

Rhodes spent the next couple seasons with the St. John's Maple Leafs, before serving as a backup to Felix Potvin from the 1993–94 season to 1995–96.

In an effort to secure a full-time starting job, Rhodes was traded on January 23, 1996 in a three-way deal between the Maple Leafs, Ottawa Senators and New York Islanders that saw him and fellow players Kirk Muller, Don Beaupre, Ken Belanger and Martin Straka, along with the rights to Wade Redden and Bryan Berard (both of whom were the top two picks in the 1995 NHL entry draft) move between the three teams.

=== Ottawa Senators ===
Rhodes was established as the Sens starting goaltender shortly after the trade. He posted a 10-22-4 record, which was largely in part to playing in front of a shaky defensive corps. His solid play however, led him to being considered the Senators goalie of the future.

Rhodes split goaltending duties with Ron Tugnutt during his first full season with the team, with Rhodes starting the majority of the team's games. Rhodes posted a 14-20-4 record with a 2.72 GAA in 50 games. Rhodes served as the team's backup in the franchise's first ever playoff series against the Buffalo Sabres, in which he saw no action.

Rhodes gained notoriety in 1998. Rhodes had a 13-17-5 record and a 2.23 GAA at the time, and opted to dye his hair blonde as a way to change his fortunes. Following the change, Rhodes posted a 10-4-2 record, lowering his GAA to 1.81. Rhodes' momentum carried into the 1998 Stanley Cup playoffs as he outplayed Martin Brodeur and was instrumental in the team's first round upset over the New Jersey Devils, which was the first playoff series victory for the Senators franchise. Rhodes' momentum would evaporate in the next round, as the Senators were defeated in five games by the Washington Capitals.

Rhodes is one of fourteen goaltenders in NHL history to score a goal, managing the task without taking a shot. Rhodes was the last player to touch the puck on a delayed penalty call when Lyle Odelein of the New Jersey Devils inadvertently put the puck in his own goal with Martin Brodeur out of the net for an extra attacker in Ottawa's 6–0 victory on January 2, 1999.

Rhodes' lack of playing time near the end of the 1998-99 season, led to Tugnutt establishing himself as the team's starting goaltender down the stretch. Rhodes' salary and tendency to allow soft goals made him expendable. Rather than lose him to the Atlanta Thrashers in the expansion draft, the Senators traded Rhodes to the Thrashers on June 18, 1999 in exchange for future considerations. Rhodes would become the first player acquired by the Thrashers franchise.

=== Atlanta Thrashers ===
Rhodes was established as the Thrashers starting goaltender following the trade, but his first season with the team was a forgettable one. He started the season posting a 3–7–2 record, before missing 49 games with a sprained ankle. Rhodes returned to the lineup, but posted a 2–12–1 record upon returning from injury. Rhodes had the distinction of recording both the franchise's first win, road win and shutout in a 2–0 defeat of the New York Islanders on October 14, 1999.

Rhodes would continue to struggle with injuries over the course of his tenure with the Thrashers posting a record of 7–19–7 record during the 2000-01 season, missing significant time due to injuries to his knee and shoulder. Rhodes' struggle to stay healthy cost him the team's goaltending job to Milan Hnilicka, who played well in his absence.

Rhodes final season for Atlanta came during the 2001–02 season, as he again struggled to stay in the Thrashers lineup, missing significant time due to injuries. Rhodes finished the season with a 2–10–1 record and a 3.67 GAA over 15 games.

Due to his injuries and inconsistent play over his three years with the team, Rhodes' days in Atlanta were numbered after the Thrashers drafted Finnish goaltender Kari Lehtonen with the second overall pick in the 2002 NHL entry draft and opted to go forward with the tandem of Hnilicka and Finnish prospect Pasi Nurminen the following season. Rhodes was bought out of his contract on July 1, 2002, posting a dismal record of 14–48–11 over three seasons.

Rhodes accepted a tryout with the Florida Panthers to attend their training camp, but he was released after failing a physical after a few days. Since he was unable to pass a physical with another NHL team, Atlanta’s buyout was cancelled and the team was held liable for his full $2.7 million salary in 2002–03. He was first loaned by Atlanta to the AHL’s Lowell Lock Monsters and then later in the season was re-assigned to the Greenville Grrrowl of the ECHL. Rhodes played 12 games for Greenville that season, going 2–8–2 and earning 1 shutout.

Rhodes finished his NHL career with a 99–140–48 record in 309 games over 10 NHL seasons with three franchises.

== Personal life ==
Rhodes was married to Amanda Jahn from 2005 to 2024. They have two children together.

Rhodes was previously married to Canadian actress Lara Wickes from 1997 to 1999. Rhodes and Wickes met in 1994, when they both resided in a Toronto area apartment, when he was a member of the Toronto Maple Leafs.

Rhodes was known for his eccentricities during his tenure with the Senators, such as refusing to change his goalie pads to ones with the team's colors following his mid-season acquisition in 1996, bleaching his hair blonde and opting to stay in Ottawa area hotels on game days in order to keep his focus.

== Career statistics ==
=== Regular season and playoffs ===
| | | | Regular season | | | | | | | | | Playoffs |
| Season | Team | League | GP | W | L | T | MIN | GA | SO | GAA | SV% | GP | W | L | MIN | GA | SO | GAA | SV% |
|---|---|---|---|---|---|---|---|---|---|---|---|---|---|---|---|---|---|---|---|
| 1985–86 | Richfield High School | HS-MN | 16 | — | — | — | 720 | 56 | 0 | 3.50 | — | — | — | — | — | — | — | — | — |
| 1986–87 | Southwest Christian School | HS-MN | 19 | — | — | — | 673 | 51 | 1 | 4.55 | — | — | — | — | — | — | — | — | — |
| 1987–88 | Michigan Tech University | WCHA | 29 | 16 | 10 | 1 | 1625 | 114 | 0 | 4.20 | .893 | — | — | — | — | — | — | — | — |
| 1988–89 | Michigan Tech University | WCHA | 37 | 15 | 22 | 0 | 2216 | 163 | 0 | 4.41 | .889 | — | — | — | — | — | — | — | — |
| 1989–90 | Michigan Tech University | WCHA | 25 | 6 | 17 | 0 | 1358 | 119 | 0 | 5.26 | .880 | — | — | — | — | — | — | — | — |
| 1990–91 | Newmarket Saints | AHL | 38 | 8 | 24 | 3 | 2154 | 144 | 1 | 4.01 | .887 | — | — | — | — | — | — | — | — |
| 1990–91 | Toronto Maple Leafs | NHL | 1 | 1 | 0 | 0 | 60 | 1 | 0 | 1.00 | .962 | — | — | — | — | — | — | — | — |
| 1991–92 | St. John's Maple Leafs | AHL | 43 | 20 | 16 | 5 | 2454 | 148 | 0 | 3.62 | .889 | 6 | 4 | 1 | 331 | 16 | 0 | 2.90 | .914 |
| 1992–93 | St. John's Maple Leafs | AHL | 52 | 27 | 16 | 8 | 3074 | 184 | 1 | 3.59 | .895 | 9 | 4 | 5 | 538 | 37 | 0 | 4.13 | — |
| 1993–94 | Toronto Maple Leafs | NHL | 22 | 9 | 7 | 3 | 1213 | 53 | 0 | 2.62 | .902 | 1 | 0 | 0 | 1 | 0 | 0 | 0.00 | 1.000 |
| 1994–95 | Toronto Maple Leafs | NHL | 13 | 6 | 6 | 1 | 760 | 34 | 0 | 2.68 | .916 | — | — | — | — | — | — | — | — |
| 1995–96 | Toronto Maple Leafs | NHL | 11 | 4 | 5 | 1 | 624 | 29 | 0 | 2.79 | .904 | — | — | — | — | — | — | — | — |
| 1995–96 | Ottawa Senators | NHL | 36 | 10 | 22 | 4 | 2123 | 98 | 2 | 2.77 | .906 | — | — | — | — | — | — | — | — |
| 1996–97 | Ottawa Senators | NHL | 50 | 14 | 20 | 14 | 2934 | 133 | 1 | 2.72 | .890 | — | — | — | — | — | — | — | — |
| 1997–98 | Ottawa Senators | NHL | 50 | 19 | 19 | 7 | 2743 | 107 | 5 | 2.34 | .907 | 10 | 5 | 5 | 590 | 21 | 0 | 2.14 | .911 |
| 1998–99 | Ottawa Senators | NHL | 45 | 22 | 13 | 7 | 2480 | 101 | 3 | 2.44 | .905 | 2 | 0 | 2 | 150 | 6 | 0 | 2.40 | .908 |
| 1999–2000 | Atlanta Thrashers | NHL | 28 | 5 | 19 | 3 | 1561 | 101 | 1 | 3.88 | .874 | — | — | — | — | — | — | — | — |
| 2000–01 | Atlanta Thrashers | NHL | 38 | 7 | 19 | 7 | 2072 | 116 | 0 | 3.36 | .897 | — | — | — | — | — | — | — | — |
| 2001–02 | Atlanta Thrashers | NHL | 15 | 2 | 10 | 1 | 769 | 47 | 0 | 3.67 | .893 | — | — | — | — | — | — | — | — |
| 2002–03 | Lowell Lock Monsters | AHL | 7 | 1 | 4 | 0 | 379 | 26 | 0 | 4.12 | .869 | — | — | — | — | — | — | — | — |
| 2002–03 | Greenville Grrrowl | ECHL | 12 | 2 | 8 | 2 | 687 | 43 | 1 | 3.76 | .891 | 1 | 0 | 1 | 60 | 6 | 0 | 6.00 | .875 |
| AHL totals | | | 140 | 56 | 60 | 16 | 8061 | 502 | 2 | 3.74 | .890 | 15 | 8 | 6 | 869 | 53 | 0 | 3.66 | — |
| NHL totals | | | 309 | 99 | 140 | 48 | 17,339 | 820 | 12 | 2.84 | .899 | 13 | 5 | 7 | 741 | 27 | 0 | 2.19 | .910 |

=== International ===
| Year | Team | Event | GP | W | L | T | MIN | GA | SO | GAA | SV% |
|---|---|---|---|---|---|---|---|---|---|---|---|
| 1988 | United States | WJC | 5 | — | — | — | — | — | — | 6.43 | — |
| 2000 | United States | WC | 5 | 3 | 1 | 1 | 309 | 12 | 1 | 2.40 | .898 |
| 2003 | United States | WC | 1 | 0 | 0 | 0 | 12 | 0 | 0 | 0.00 | 1.000 |
| Senior totals | | | 6 | 3 | 1 | 1 | 321 | 12 | 1 | 2.24 | .902 |
