= Wood Lake Nature Center =

Nature center in Richfield, Minnesota, United States

Coordinates: 44°52′37.5″N 93°17′35″W

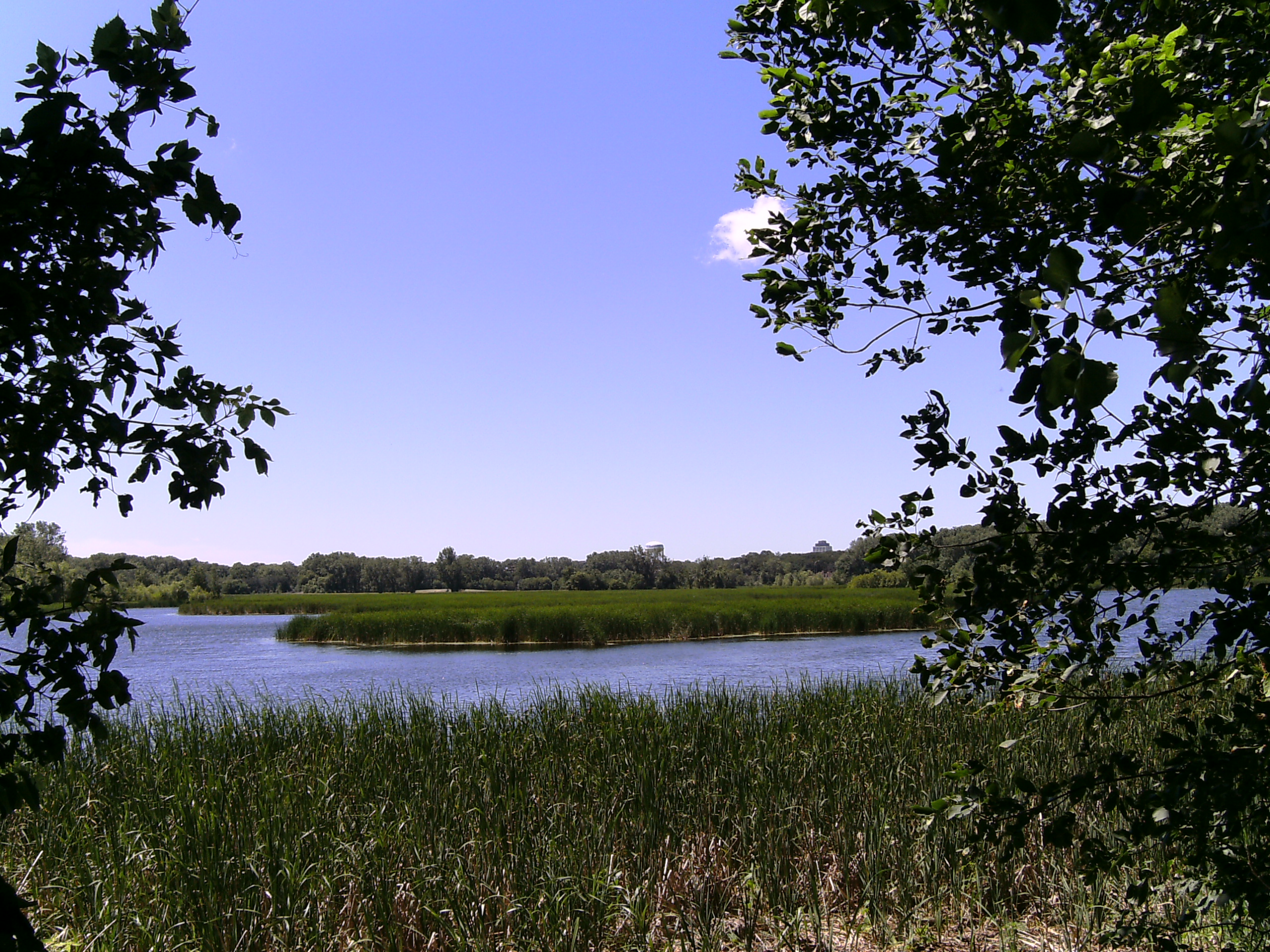
Wood Lake Nature Center is in Richfield, Minnesota

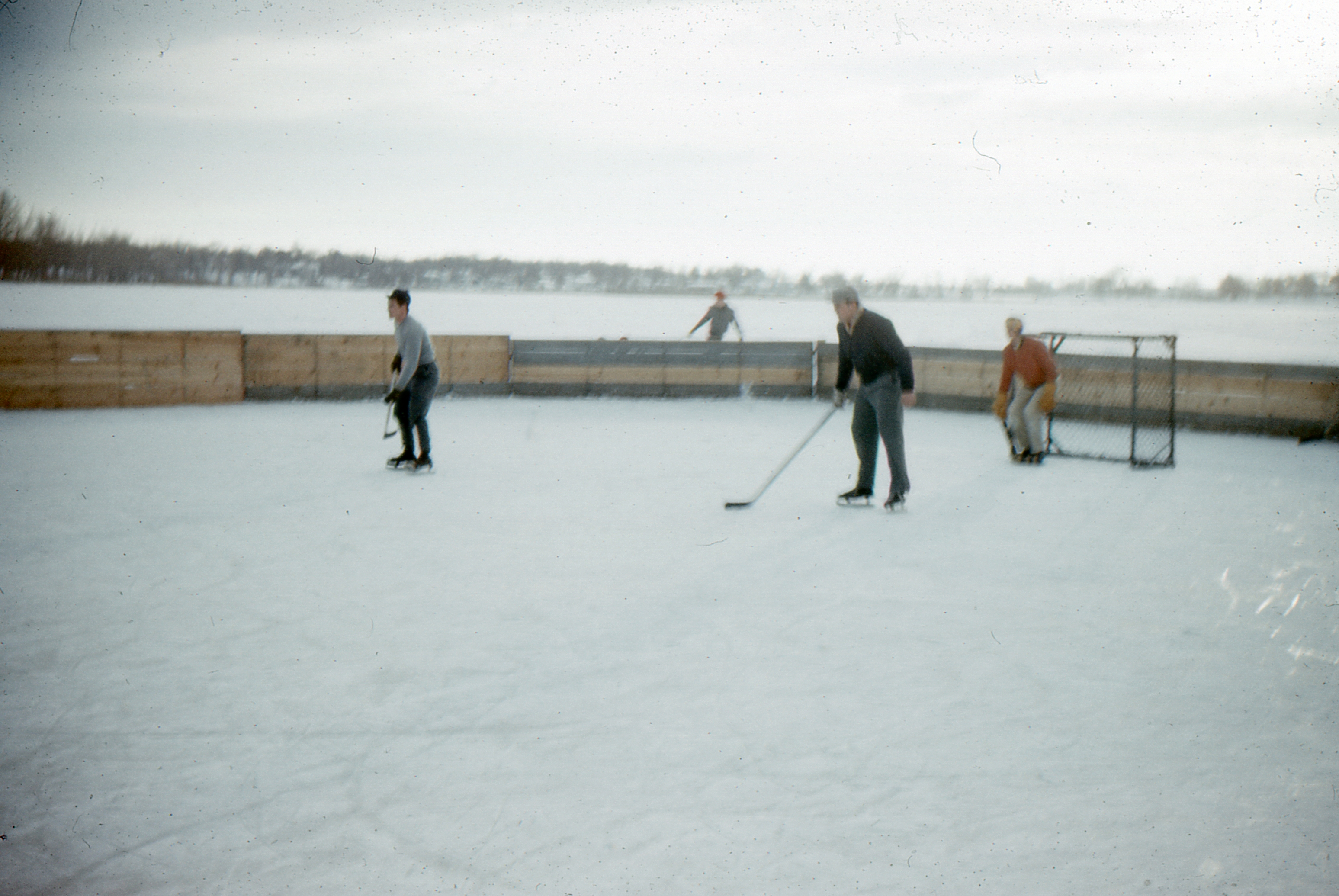
Playing hockey on Wood Lake in 1955

Wood Lake Nature Center is a 150-acre (0.61 km^{2}) nature preserve within Richfield, Minnesota. In addition to Wood Lake, the park contains mixed lowland forest, cattail marsh and restored prairie habitats. Three miles of walking trails and boardwalks surround the lake as well as observation shelters, docks, a picnic area, and an outdoor amphitheater. The trails at Wood Lake are either paved or made with crushed limestone, making them widely accessible during summer months. There is an Interpretive Center in Wood Lake Nature Center staffed by naturalists who offer year round class for adults and children. According to the Wood Lake Nature Center's website, Wood Lake was once a recreational lake surrounded by homes. Most of the Wood Lakes's water drained during the 1950s, due in part to the effects of the construction of nearby Interstate 35W. The city of Richfield founded the Wood Lake Nature Center in 1971.

== Environment ==
Wood Lake is composed of three main ecosystems: forest, marsh, and prairie. In recent years, there has been a conscious effort to restore prairie habitat on park grounds. There has also been work to develop an oak savannah, which is in early stages. To preserve these habitats, Wood Lake does not allow pets, bikes, or skates on park grounds. Foraging and picking plants is also banned.

Wood Lake's marsh is sustained by storm water. There are multiple pipes from storm drains around the city of Richfield and one outflowing pipe which is used in case of high water. Because of this, small amounts of rainfall can have a drastic effect on the water level in the marsh. Many animals rely on the marsh for survival, including fish, waterfowl, and coyotes.

== Friends of Wood Lake ==
In 1991, Friends of Wood Lake (FOWL) was launched as an advocacy and fundraising group in support of the nature center. Major fundraising events include the Urban Wildland Half Marathon and 5K Race and Friends of Wood Lake Golf Klassic.
