= Stillwater Area High School =

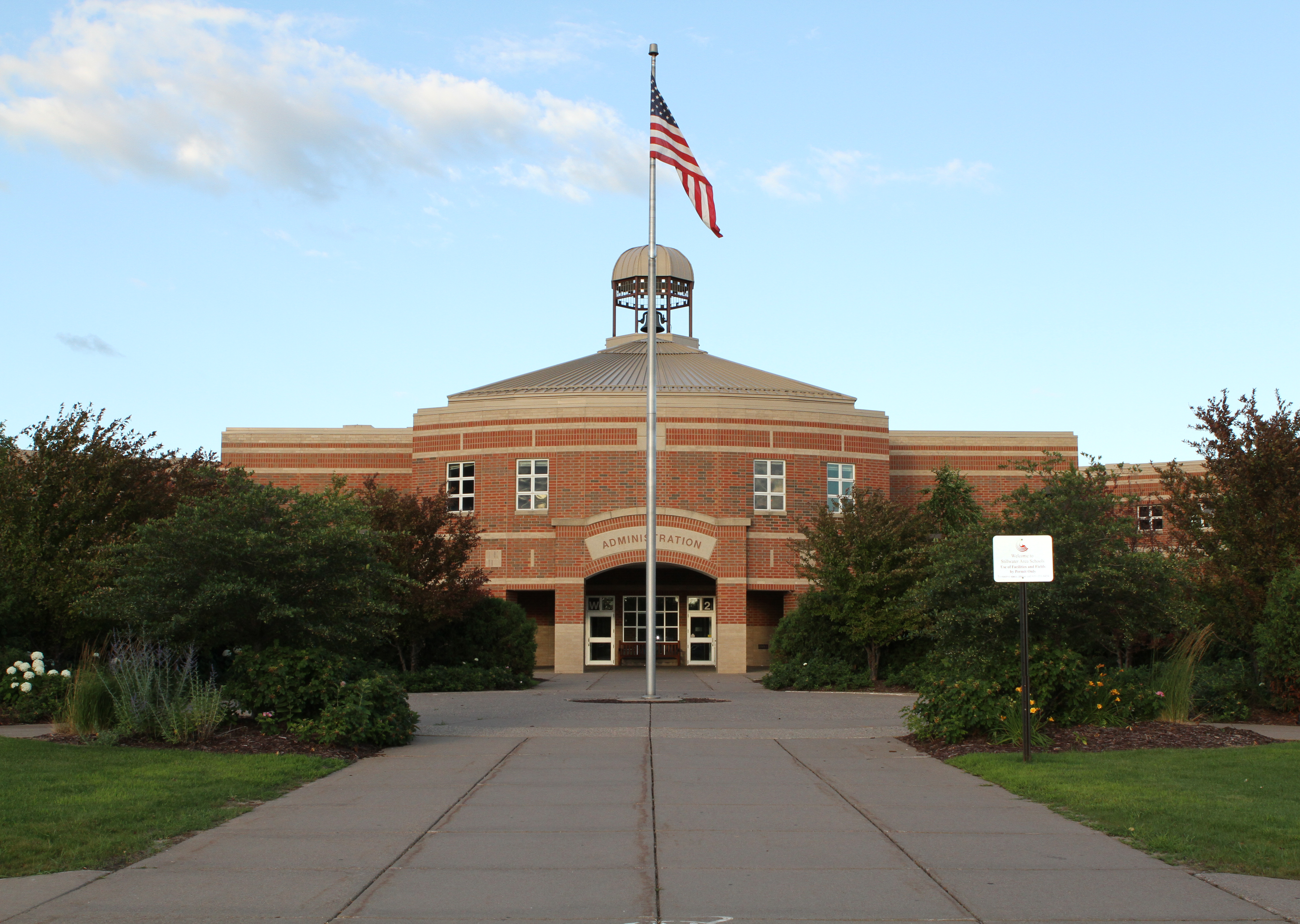

Location
- 5701 Stillwater Blvd N Oak Park Heights, Minnesota 55082; United States; 45.02967°N 92.8474°W

Information
- Type: Public
- Motto: We learn not for school, but for life.
- Established: 1887
- Principal: Robert Bach
- Faculty: 102.41 (FTE)
- Enrollment: 2,713 (2023–2024)
- Student to teacher ratio: 26.49
- Colors: Red, black, and white
- Athletics conference: Suburban East
- Mascot: Pony
- Newspaper: The Pony Express
- Website: Stillwater Area High School

Stillwater Area High School (SAHS) is a public school located in Oak Park Heights, Minnesota, United States. It serves as the primary high school for the Stillwater Area Public School District (834), the oldest public school district in Minnesota.

The current campus was built in 1993 thanks to a 28 million dollar bond that was approved by the citizens of District 834. The previous location is now Stillwater Middle School. (SMS). Students from both SMS and Oakland Middle School attend Stillwater Area High School. Newsweek ranked the school #326 in their "List of the 500 Top High Schools in America in 2015."

Stillwater was designed by the architecture firm ATS&R. In 2017, the school completed a $97 million dollar renovation, involving the construction of a new 9th grade wing, a new gym and Pony Activity Center (PAC).

== Athletics ==
The 2016 boys' soccer team finished the season ranked fourth in the nation by USA Today on its final Super 25 Expert Rankings.

State championships
Season	Sport	Number of championships
Fall	Girls Swim and Dive	3 State 7 True Team State
Fall	Football	4 State
Fall	Soccer, Boys	3 State
Fall	Soccer, Girls	2 State
Fall	Cross Country, Boys	5 State 1 National (1997)
Fall	Adapted Soccer	2 State
Winter	Basketball, Boys	1 State
Winter	Nordic Skiing, Girls	8 State
Winter	Nordic Skiing, Boys	6 State
Winter	Alpine Skiing, Boys	1 State
Winter	Alpine Skiing, Girls	9 State
Winter	Hockey, Girls	2 State
Spring	Baseball	2 State
Spring	Softball	5 State
Spring	Synchronised swimming	18 State
Spring	Golf, Girls	2 State
Spring	Track and Field, Boys	3 State 3 True Team State
Spring	Track and Field, Girls	1 True Team State
Spring	Tennis, Boys	1 State
Total		77 State 11 True Team State 1 National

== Notable alumni ==
- Thomas J. Abercrombie — photographer, first journalist to reach South Pole
- Glen Perkins — pitcher for Minnesota Twins
- Butch Thompson — jazz pianist and clarinetist
- E. E. Knight — science fiction and fantasy writer
- Denis McDonough — former White House Chief of Staff and United States Secretary of Veterans Affairs.
- Gordon Klatt — colorectal specialist, founder of Relay For Life
- Jessie Diggins — Olympic cross-country skier, multiple overall world championship wins
- Sydney Peterson - Olympic cross-country skier
- Patrick Hicks — novelist, poet, and essayist
- Shura Baryshnikov, dancer/actress
- Anne La Berge — flutist, composer
- Ben Blankenship — Olympic distance runner
- Rich Sommer — actor (Mad Men)
- Chris Maddock, stand-up comedian
- Zach Sobiech, singer/songwriter of "Clouds"
- Chris Engler, former NBA player
- Drew Gilbert, MLB outfielder for San Francisco Giants
- Noah Cates, NHL winger for Philadelphia Flyers

== Notable staff ==
- Chris Engler – former NBA player; history teacher
- Phil Housley – former NHL player; former head coach of Stillwater boys' hockey team
- Mira Jalosuo – Olympic medalist; head coach of Stillwater girls' hockey team, 2019–2022

== Impostor ==
In 2005, Stillwater Area High School was visited three times by somebody calling himself Caspian James Crichton-Stuart IV, the Fifth Duke of Cleveland and 27th in line for the British throne. He claimed he was seventeen years old and interested in attending the school. Student journalists from the school newspaper The Pony Express received national attention after uncovering the potential student was actually Joshua Adam Gardner, a 22 year old registered sex offender. The journalists who helped uncover the true identity of Gardner were interviewed on Fox News, CNN, Good Morning America, MSNBC, and participated in a number of radio and newspaper interviews.
