= Wayzata High School =

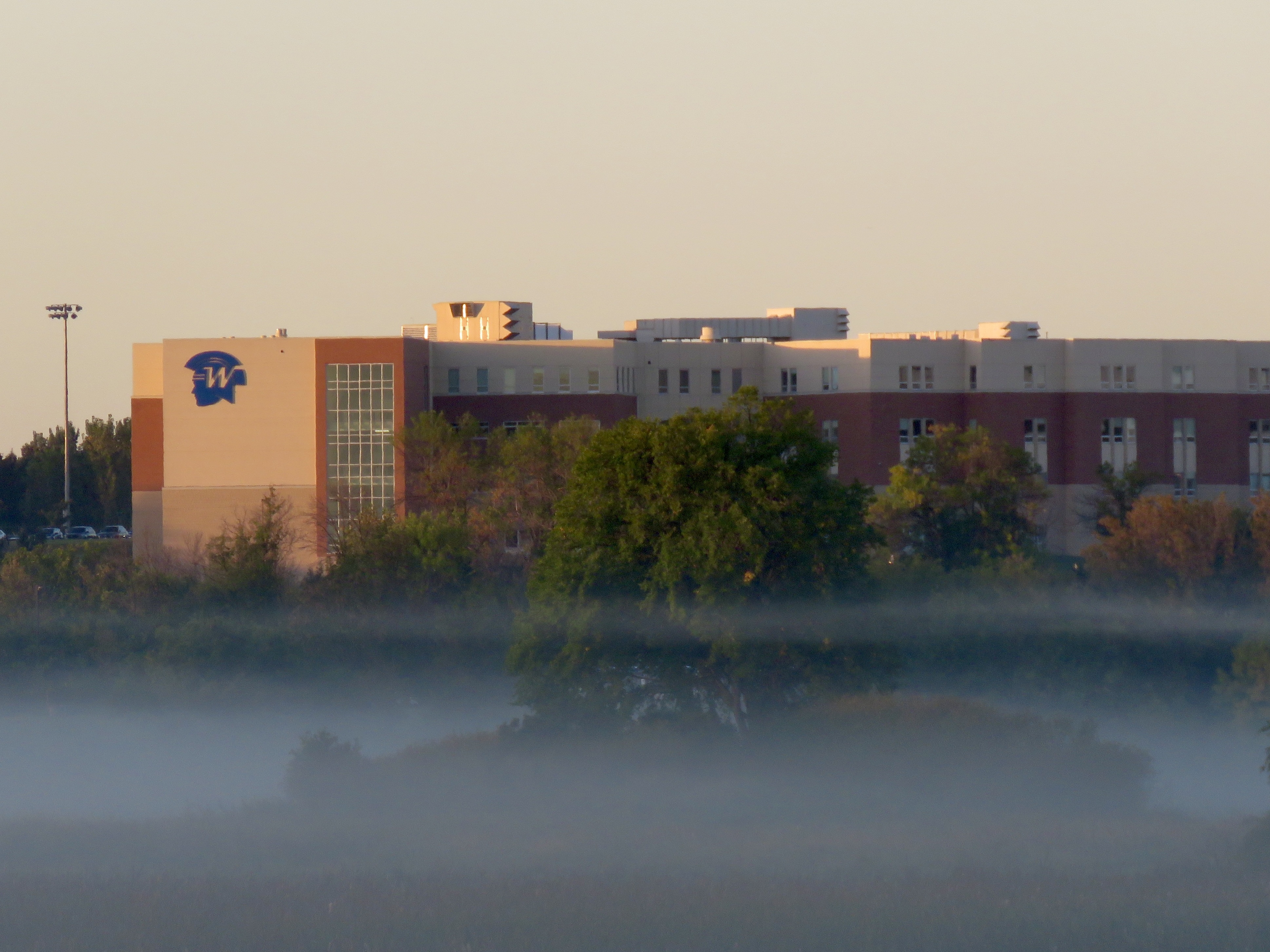

Location
- 4955 Peony Lane; Plymouth, Minnesota 55446; United States; 45°2′44″N 93°30′35″W

Information
- Type: Public
- Motto: "We're Here for You"
- Established: 1855
- School district: Wayzata School District
- Principal: Scott Gengler
- Teaching staff: 173.84 (FTE)
- Grades: 9–12
- Enrollment: 3,781 (2024–2025)
- Student to teacher ratio: 21.75
- Colors: Royal blue and gold
- Athletics conference: Lake Conference
- Team name: Trojans
- Website: www.wayzataschools.org/whs

Wayzata High School is a four-year comprehensive public high school in Plymouth, Minnesota, United States, a suburb of Minneapolis. The high school, operated by Wayzata Public Schools, has 3,781 students in grades 9 to 12 as of 2026, making it Minnesota's largest secondary school by total enrollment. It is also Minnesota's largest secondary school by size, with an interior of 658,000 square feet (61,100 m^{2}). The district boundaries include all of Medicine Lake and parts of Corcoran, Maple Grove, Medina, Minnetonka, Orono, Plymouth, and Wayzata. The school finished an expansion project in 2017 with the new capacity of 3,900. It is part of the Lake Conference.

In 2015, Newsweek ranked the school 150th on its "List of the 500 Top High Schools in America". U.S. News & World Report ranked the school 432nd among 21,000 schools nationally and 6th in Minnesota in 2021.

== History ==
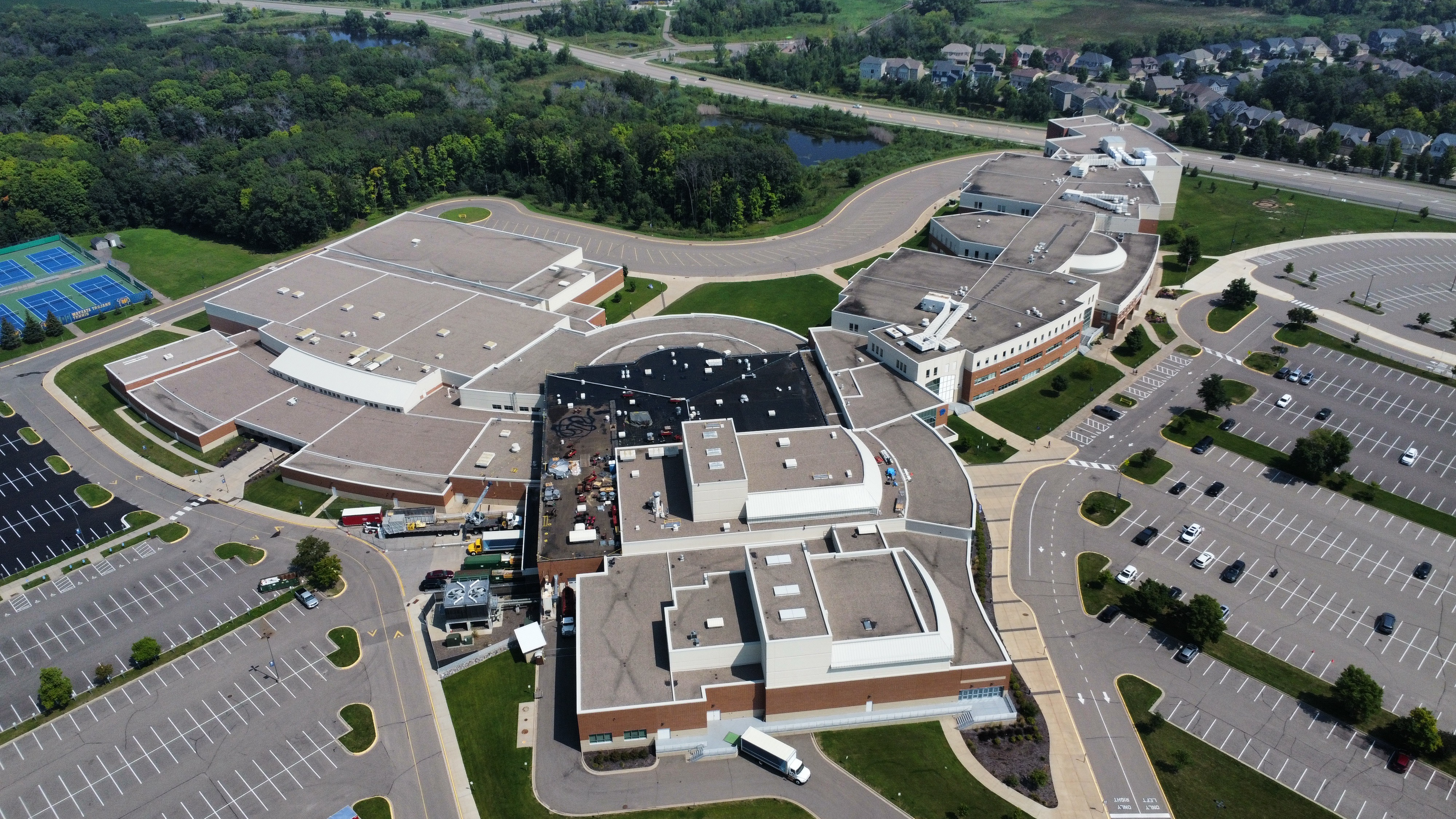
The Wayzata High School campus

The first school in the Wayzata area was established around 1855. Classes were taught in homes until a one-room school was built near what is now the second green of the Wayzata Country Club. This school burned down (for unknown reasons) and a new school was constructed on what is now Wayzata's main street near downtown Wayzata.

What are now the West and Central middle schools were each once the high school building. The West Middle School building served as the high school from 1940 to 1960. Central Middle School's campus was home to the high school from 1960 to 1997. The current Wayzata High School campus was completed in 1997 and classes began in the 1997–98 school year.

On February 25, 2014, voters approved a referendum for a $109 million bond request to expand the high school and improve security and technology. Part of the provisions include the purchasing of adjacent land belonging to the Elm Creek Golf Course and the building of a new wing. Construction took place from 2014 to 2017.

== Demographics ==
Wayzata High School has the largest enrollment of any Minnesota high school. As of 2026, the school has a student population of 3,781 that is 0.2% Native American, 4.9% Hispanic, 5.3% multiracial, 9% black, 24% Asian, and 56.5% white.

== Academics ==
As of the 2015–16 school year, Wayzata High School offers 24 Advanced Placement classes and one Advanced Placement Pilot course (AP Accounting). The school also hosts the Minnesota PSEO program, allowing students in 11th and 12th grades to receive college credit. In 2014, the school began a district-wide technology program that issued each student a district-owned iPad.

Wayzata High School has consistently exceeded the state and national average scores on the ACT.

== Extracurricular activities ==
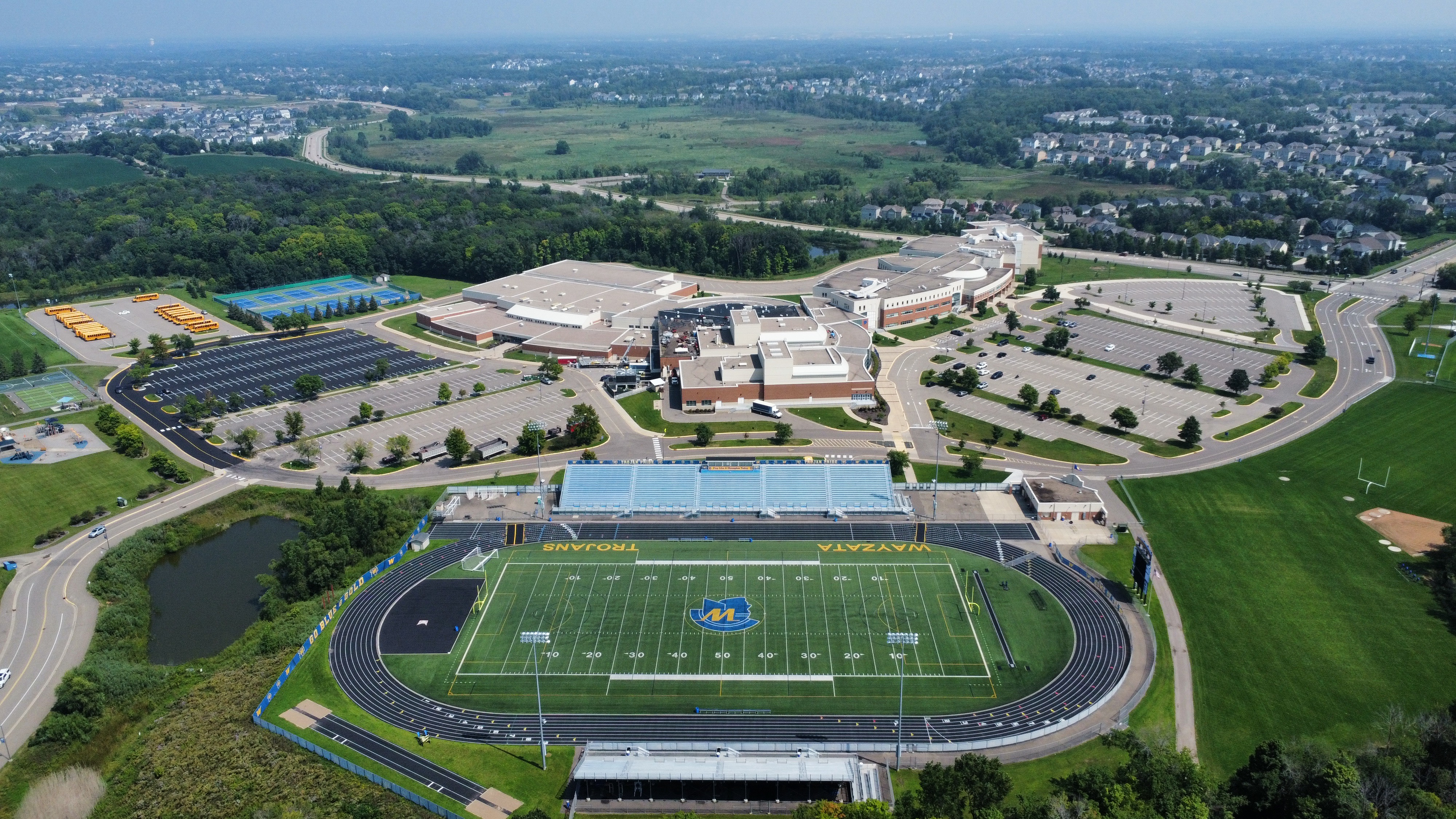
The Wayzata Trojans field in 2024

=== Athletics ===
Wayzata is part of the Lake Conference and in the Minnesota State High School League. Wayzata was in the Classic Lake Conference before the 2010–11 school year. The school sponsors the following sports teams:

- Fall
  - Girls' Soccer
  - Boys' Soccer
  - Cheer team
  - Girls' cross country
  - Boys' cross country
  - Football
  - Girls' swimming and diving
  - Girls' tennis
  - Girls' volleyball
- Winter
  - Alpine ski racing
  - Boys' basketball
  - Girls' basketball
  - Cheer team
  - Dance team
  - Gymnastics
  - Boys' hockey
  - Girls' hockey
  - Nordic ski racing
  - Boys' swimming and diving
  - Wrestling
- Spring
  - Softball
  - Boys' golf
  - Girls' golf
  - Boys' lacrosse
  - Girls' lacrosse
  - Baseball
  - Synchronized swimming
  - Boys' tennis
  - Boys' track and field
  - Girls' track and field
  - Boys' volleyball

==== Wayzata's notable athletic championships ====
Girls' cross country won the Nike NXN National Cross Country Championship in 2013 and 2025.

| Season | Sport | Championships |
|---|---|---|
| Fall | Football | 2005, 2008, 2010, 2019 |
| Fall | Soccer, Boys' | 1985, 2005, 2017, 2022, 2023 |
| Fall | Soccer, Girls' | 1991, 1996, 2000, 2002, 2009, 2011, 2012, 2024 |
| Fall | Cross Country, Boys' | 1992, 1993, 2000, 2007, 2008, 2010, 2013, 2014, 2016, 2017, 2021, 2022, 2023 |
| Fall | Cross Country, Girls' | 2012, 2013, 2014, 2017, 2022, 2023, 2024, 2025 |
| Fall | Swimming, Girls' | 2013, 2014, 2015 |
| Fall | Volleyball, Girls' | 2019, 2021, 2022, 2023 |
| Winter | Basketball, Boys' | 1959, 2021, 2023, 2025 |
| Winter | Hockey, Boys' | 2016 |
| Winter | Wrestling | 1941, 1951, 1952, 1953 |
| Winter | Dance Team | 1978, 1980, 1988, 1989, 1993, 2006, 2007, 2009, 2010, 2012, 2018, 2019 (x2 Kick and Jazz),2024 |
| Winter | Skiing, Nordic Girls' | 1980, 2013, 2014, 2015 |
| Winter | Skiing, Nordic Boys' | 2018, 2024, 2025 |
| Winter | Gymnastics | 2022 |
| Winter | Swimming, Boys' | 2014 |
| Spring | Golf, Boys' | 1994, 1998, 2009, 2010, 2011, 2015, 2017 |
| Spring | Golf, Girls' | 2011, 2014 |
| Spring | Synchronized swimming | 2007, 2008, 2009, 2010, 2011, 2012, 2013, 2014, 2015, 2016, 2017, 2018, 2019 |
| Spring | Tennis, Boys' | 1993, 1999, 2013, 2014, 2023, 2024, 2025, 2026 |
| Spring | Track and Field, Boys' | 1977, 1980, 1984, 1995, 2012, 2015, 2016, 2018 |
| Spring | True Team Track and Field, Boys' | 2013, 2014, 2015, 2016, 2017, 2018, 2023 |
| Spring | Track and Field, Girls' | 2007, 2025, 2026 |
| Spring | True Team Track and Field, Girls' | 2018, 2025 |
| Spring | Adapted Bowling | 2006, 2007, 2008, 2009 |
| Spring | Ultimate Frisbee | 2025 |
| Total | | |

=== Clubs and activities ===
In the 2019 National Science Bowl Competition, Wayzata High School won the Final Championship against Dulles High School.

Wayzata's quiz bowl team won both the NAQT Minnesota State Championship and Minnesota High School Quiz Bowl League in 2012, 2013, 2018, 2020, 2021, 2022, 2023 and 2024. It placed at T-8 in the High School National Championship Tournament in 2018 and 2021.

Wayzata participates in the Minnesota State High School Mathematics League, holding the season champion title for 11 years (2007–2017) and producing many state individual champions. Several Wayzata students travel to the American Regions Mathematics League held in University of Iowa and Harvard-MIT Mathematics Tournament as members of the Minnesota All-State Mathematics Team.

The 9th grade Knowledge Master Open team won the national spring KMO in the 9th grade division in 2009.

== Notable alumni ==
- Charles Nolte (1941), Broadway and film actor
- Dick Beardsley (1975), marathon runner
- David Gaither (1975), former Minnesota state senator and Governor Tim Pawlenty's Chief of Staff
- Steve Wright (1977), NFL player, contestant on Survivor: Redemption Island
- Amy Klobuchar (1978), U.S. senator representing Minnesota
- Kimberly Elise (1985), actress
- Betsy Hodges (1987), former mayor of Minneapolis
- Tim Herron (1989), professional golfer
- Mike Muller (1991), NHL player
- David Bromstad (1992), interior designer and HGTV television show host
- Ben Hamilton (1996), NFL player
- Kirsten Gronfield (1996), actress
- Benjamin Salisbury (1998), actor
- Marion Barber III (2001), NFL player
- Shawn Daivari (2002), professional wrestler
- Andrew Peterson (2003), former defender for the Columbus Crew
- Dominique Barber (2004), NFL player
- Ryan Saunders (2004), former head coach of the Minnesota Timberwolves, current assistant coach of the Memphis Grizzlies
- François-Henri Désérable (2005), author and professional ice hockey player
- James Laurinaitis (2005), NFL player
- Emily Tyra (2005), actress, singer, and dancer
- Ariya Daivari (2007), professional wrestler
- A.J. Tarpley (2010), NFL player
- Heather Arseth (2011), swimmer in the 2012 Summer Olympics
- Andrew Donlin (2011), professional team handball player
- Jake Blum (2012), North Dakota State Representative, and Minnesota lobbyist
- Joey Gerber (2015), professional baseball player
- Sophia Kunin (2015), PWHL player
- Andrew Tang (2018), chess grandmaster
- Patrick Weah (2020), professional soccer player
- Camden Heide (2021), college basketball player
- Jackson McAndrew (2024), college basketball player

== Notable faculty ==
- Terry Steinbach (1980), former head baseball coach
- David Plummer (2013-2016) and (2024–present), head boys swim and dive coach
