= Baker Stadium =

Multi-purpose stadium in Tacoma, Washington

- Location in the United States Location in Washington
- Interactive map of Baker Stadium
- Location: University of Puget Sound; Tacoma, Washington, U.S.
- Coordinates: 47.2604°N 122.4816°W
- Owner: University of Puget Sound
- Capacity: 3,500
- Surface: Natural grass

Construction
- Opened: September 26, 1964

Tenants
- University of Puget Sound (football, track and field)

Peyton Field at Baker Stadium is a 3,500-seat outdoor multi-purpose stadium on the campus of the University of Puget Sound in the north end of Tacoma, Washington, United States. It is used by the UPS Logger football, soccer, track and field, cross country, and lacrosse teams.

The stadium opened on September 26, 1964, with covered seating for 3,300 spectators and an additional 2,500 bleacher seats. It was the first stadium for the UPS football program and was built with a grant from prominent Tacoma businessman John S. Baker; the field is named after former Puget Sound alumni Joe Peyton, who was a long-time coach and faculty member. The stadium has covered seating of 3,000 and uncovered seating of 500.

Baker Stadium was the site of the first Relay for Life, which was started in May 1985 by surgeon Gordon Klatt as a 24-hour fundraiser walkathon for the American Cancer Society.
