= St. Croix Lutheran Academy =

Location
- West St. Paul, Minnesota; United States
- Coordinates: 44.90953°N 93.07292°W

Information
- Former name: St. Croix Lutheran High School
- Type: Private middle and high school
- Religious affiliation: Lutheranism
- Denomination: Wisconsin Evangelical Lutheran Synod
- Established: 1958; 68 years ago
- Principal: Brad Essig
- Teaching staff: 40.9 (on an FTE basis)
- Grades: 6–12
- Enrollment: 484 (2024-2025)
- Student to teacher ratio: 11.7
- Colors: Red and white
- Athletics conference: Skyline
- Mascot: Crusaders
- Website: stcroixlutheran.org

St. Croix Lutheran Academy formerly known as St. Croix Lutheran High School, is a private Lutheran middle school and high school in West St. Paul, Minnesota, in the United States. The school has a student body population of about 500 in sixth through twelfth grade. Most of SCLA's students live in the greater Minneapolis/St. Paul area and travel to and from school each day. Approximately 150 of the students are boarding school students from elsewhere in America or from other countries, who live in an on-campus residence.

St. Croix is a school with one of the lowest Christian private school tuitions in the state of Minnesota. Teachers work with students in classes that prepare them for college and include the required courses of English, Social Studies, Mathematics, Religion, Science, Physical Education and Health. College level courses include advanced placement (AP) options, STEM courses, PSEO, and dual credit online courses. A variety of elective courses encourage student's special interests and prepares them for a university.

== Athletics ==
St. Croix offers 23 interscholastic sports teams including baseball, basketball, bowling, clay target league, dance, football, golf, hockey, lacrosse, softball, soccer, tennis, track and field, volleyball, and wrestling. The football, basketball and track teams make regular trips to the state tournament. The football team won their first MSHSL State Championship in class AAA with an undefeated season in 2011, and then again in 2013 with 10-2 record. The men's track and field team won the Class A Minnesota True Team State Track and Field championship in 2009 and 2023.

== Fine arts ==
SCLA offers a variety of opportunities in visual arts, choral music, instrumental music, and theatre or dramatic arts. The Croixaliers is a vocal ensemble that performs at school concerts, off-campus area worship services, and state and national choral festivals and competitions. Leadership opportunities include Model United Nations, Youth in Government, International Mentors, and many other programs.

== Dormitory ==
St. Croix offers a dormitory for students living on campus. With six wings—three for boys and three for girls—St. Croix can house more than one hundred students. The dormitory is equipped with a bathroom, refrigerators, kitchen, dining hall, lounge, and study areas. Students living on campus have full access to the school's property, including the football field, weight room, and gymnasium, but only when a supervisor is on duty.
