= Minnesota True Team State Track and Field =

The Minnesota True Team State Meet was created in 1987 by the Minnesota State High School Coaches Association to determine the top overall team based on depth rather than top finishers. In a traditional track and field meet, only the top eight or nine competitors per event score points. In the True Team meet, each team has two competitors per event for A and AA and three competitors for AAA as well as one relay team, with each competitor scoring (barring disqualification). Since 2005, Minnesota now holds a True Team State swim meet.

The first A & AA meets were run at St. Cloud Apollo and the first 3A & 4A State meets were run at Park High School. Later meets were held at the National Sports Center in Blaine, Minnesota, until 2006, when the track conditions were too poor to use. Since 2006, the meet has taken place at Stillwater High School.

== Past Champions: Girls Class A ==
- 2022 - Grand Meadow-LeRoy-Ostrander-Kingsland-Southland
- 2021 - Grand Meadow-LeRoy-Ostrander-Kingsland-Southland
- 2020 - Cancelled Due to COVID-19
- 2019 - Minnewaska Area
- 2018 - Maple Lake
- 2017 - Osakis
- 2016 - Blue Earth
- 2015 - Blue Earth
- 2014 - Luverne
- 2013 - Esko
- 2012 - Esko
- 2011 - Esko
- 2010 - Luverne
- 2009 - Blue Earth
- 2008 - Luverne
- 2007 - Pipestone
- 2006 - Rushford-Peterson/Houston
- 2005 -
- 2004 -
- 2003 -
- 2002 - Mayer Lutheran
- 2001 - Southwest Star Concept
- 2000 - Southwest Star Concept
- 1999 - Southwest Star Concept
- 1998 - Southwest Star Concept
- 1997 - Holdingford
- 1996 - Pierz
- 1995 - Pierz
- 1994 - Rochester Lourdes
- 1993 - Plainview
- 1992 - Heron Lake/Okabena

== Past Champions: Girls Class AA ==
- 2022 - Rocori
- 2021 - Rocori
- 2020 - Cancelled due to COVID-19
- 2019 - Willmar
- 2018 - Rocori
- 2017 - Rocori
- 2016 - Red Wing
- 2015 - Rocori
- 2014 - Sartell-St.Stephen
- 2013 - Sartell-St.Stephen
- 2012 - Totino-Grace
- 2011 - Totino-Grace
- 2010 - Totino-Grace
- 2009 - Totino-Grace
- 2008 - Totino-Grace
- 2007 - Mankato East
- 2006 -Sartell-St.Stephen
- 2005 -Sartell-St.Stephen
- 2004 - Mankato East
- 2003 -
- 2002 - Mankato East
- 2001 - Fairmont
- 2000 - Fairmont
- 1999 - Fairmont
- 1998 - Fairmont
- 1997 - St. Louis Park
- 1996 -
- 1995 - Shakopee
- 1994 - Sartell
- 1993 - Sartell
- 1992 - Sartell

== Past Champions: Girls Class AAA ==
- 2023 - Minnetonka
- 2022 - Minnetonka
- 2021 - Rosemount
- 2020 - Cancelled due to COVID-19
- 2019 - Rosemount
- 2018 - Wayzata
- 2017 - Minnetonka
- 2016 - Lakeville South
- 2015 - Mounds View
- 2014 - Lakeville South
- 2013 - Lakeville South
- 2012 - Lakeville South
- 2011 - Hopkins
- 2010 - Mounds View
- 2009 - Mounds View
- 2008 - Eastview
- 2007 - Mounds View
- 2006 - Apple Valley
- 2005 - Apple Valley
- 2004 - Apple Valley
- 2003 - Apple Valley
- 2002 - Lakeville
- 2001 - Lakeville
- 2000 - Lakeville
- 1999 - Lakeville
- 1998 - Apple Valley
- 1997 - Apple Valley
- 1996 - Apple Valley
- 1995 - Mounds View
- 1994 - Apple Valley and Mounds View
- 1993 - Apple Valley
- 1992 - Minnetonka and Roseville Area

== Past Champions: Boys Class A ==
- 2022 - Lanesboro-Fillmore Central
- 2021 - Pine Island
- 2020 - Cancelled due to COVID-19
- 2019 - St. Charles
- 2018 - Holdingford
- 2017 - Holdingford
- 2016 - Montevideo
- 2015 - Holdingford
- 2014 - Holdingford
- 2013 - Cotter High School (Winona, MN)
- 2012 - Maple Lake
- 2011 - United South Central
- 2010 - Pipestone
- 2009 - St. Croix Lutheran High School
- 2008 - St. Croix Lutheran High School
- 2007 - St. Croix Lutheran High School
- 2006 - Plainview
- 2005 - Dilworth-Glyndon-Felton
- 2004 - Dilworth-Glyndon-Felton
- 2003 - Plainview
- 2002 - Plainview
- 2001 - Plainview
- 2000 - Mayer Lutheran
- 1999 - United South Central
- 1998 - United South Central
- 1997 - Murray County Central
- 1996 - Byron
- 1995 - Lanesboro-Fillmore Central
- 1994 - Lanesboro-Fillmore Central
- 1993 - Lanesboro-Fillmore Central
- 1992 - Harmony-Lanesboro Preston-Fountain

== Past Champions: Boys Class AA ==
- 2022 - Mankato East
- 2021 - Willmar
- 2020 - Cancelled due to COVID-19
- 2019 - Willmar
- 2018 - Willmar
- 2017 - Willmar
- 2016 - Willmar
- 2015 - Mankato East
- 2014 - Totino-Grace
- 2013 - Totino-Grace
- 2012 - Totino-Grace
- 2011 - Totino-Grace
- 2010 - Mankato East
- 2009 - Totino-Grace
- 2008 - New Prague
- 2007 - Mankato West
- 2006 - Totino-Grace
- 2005 - Mankato East
- 2004 - Mankato East
- 2003 - Mankato West
- 2002 - Mankato West
- 2001 - Sauk Rapids
- 2000 - Sartell
- 1999 - Red Wing
- 1998 - Fairmont
- 1997 - Mahtomedi
- 1996 - Mahtomedi
- 1995 - Shakopee
- 1994 - Monticello
- 1993 - Cretin-Derham Hall
- 1992 - Rocori

== Past Champions: Boys Class AAA ==
- 2023 - Wayzata
- 2022 - Rosemount
- 2021 - Rosemount
- 2020 - Cancelled due to COVID-19
- 2019 - Hopkins
- 2018 - Wayzata
- 2017 - Wayzata
- 2016 - Wayzata
- 2015 - Wayzata
- 2014 - Wayzata
- 2013 - Wayzata
- 2012 - Minnetonka
- 2011 - Rosemount
- 2010 - Eden Prairie
- 2009 - Rosemount
- 2008 - Eden Prairie
- 2007 - Mounds View
- 2006 - Mounds View
- 2005 - Lakeville
- 2004 - Moorhead
- 2003 - Mounds View
- 2002 - Mounds View
- 2001 - Mounds View
- 2000 - Mounds View
- 1999 - Mounds View
- 1998 - Mounds View
- 1997 - Stillwater
- 1996 - Lakeville
- 1995 - Stillwater
- 1994 - Minnetonka
- 1993 - Forest Lake
- 1992 - Apple Valley

(Note, from 1987 until 1991, there were four divisions)
