= François-Henri Désérable =

French author and ice hockey player

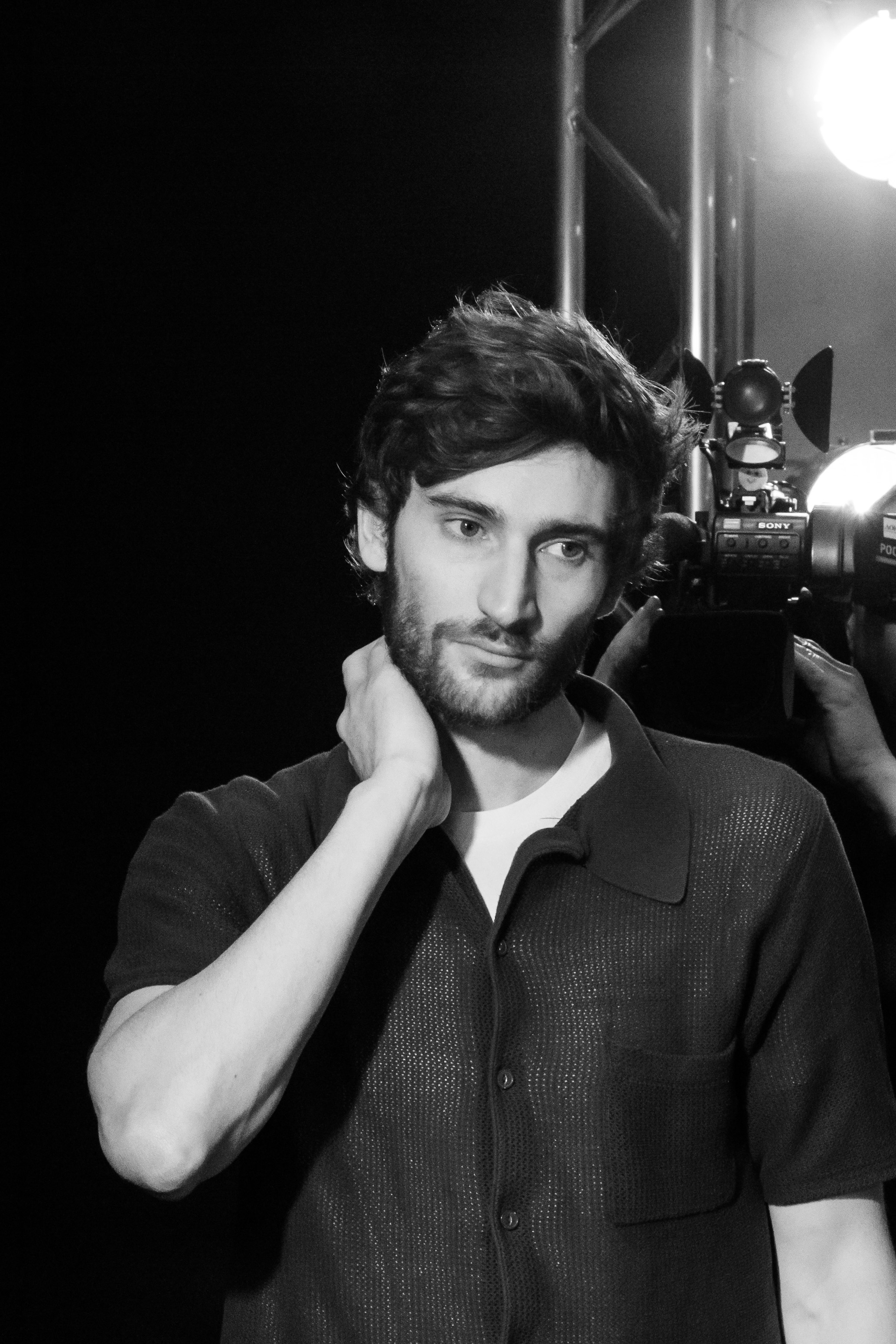
- François-Henri Désérable in 2019
- Born: 6 February 1987 (age 39); Amiens, France
- Occupations: Author, Ice hockey player
- Writing career
- Notable works: Évariste; Un certain M. Piekielny; Mon maître et mon vainqueur

François-Henri Désérable (born Amiens, France, 6 February 1987) is a French author and a former professional ice hockey player.

== Life and education ==
=== Family and Early Life ===
The son of an ice hockey player who later became the director of an occupational health service, and of a secretary working for the Red Cross, François-Henri Désérable spent most of his childhood and adolescence in Amiens, in northern France. His paternal grandfather owned a hardware store, while his maternal grandfather, a native of Venice, worked as a gondolier.

=== Education ===
A promising hockey player from an early age, Désérable trained with the Amiens Gothiques hockey club. He attended high school in Minnesota, United States, before completing his secondary education in Amiens.

At eighteen, he became a professional hockey player while simultaneously studying law at the University of Picardy Jules Verne and later at Jean Moulin Lyon III University. At twenty-three, he began doctoral research on the enforcement of arbitral awards in relation to state immunity from execution. He eventually abandoned his PhD to devote himself entirely to literature.

== Literature ==
Désérable began writing at the age of eighteen after reading Albert Cohen’s Belle du Seigneur.

His first book, Tu montreras ma tête au peuple, short stories about the French Revolution, was released in April 2013 by Gallimard and won multiple literary awards.

Two years later, he published Évariste, a novel about Évariste Galois, a French mathematician who revolutionized algebra and died at age 20 from wounds suffered in a duel. In France, the book was considered as one of the "literary sensations of the year 2015".

Un certain M. Piekielny, literary investigation around a character invented by Romain Gary, was the only novel selected for the six major French literary prizes in 2017.

In Mon maître et mon vainqueur (2021), he dissects the mechanisms of passionate love. This novel won the Grand Prix du roman de l'Académie française.

At the end of 2022, during the crackdown that followed the death of Mahsa Amini, Désérable spent forty days traveling across Iran, from Tehran to the borders of Baluchistan. Following, seventy years later, the route taken by Nicolas Bouvier and Thierry Vernet in The Way of the World, he returned with L'Usure d'un monde, a travel narrative portraying an exhausted Islamic Republic struggling to suppress the aspirations of its people.

In 2025, Chagrin d’un chant inachevé : Sur la route de Che Guevara, recounting a five-month journey across South America from Argentina to Venezuela, on the road of Che Guevara.

His books have been translated into more than twenty languages.

His novel Le Palais, a story of revenge in the world of wine, was awarded the Renaudot Prize in November 2026.

== Hockey career ==
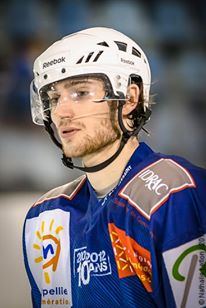
Désérable in 2013 with the Montpellier Vipers

François-Henri Désérable was also a professional ice-hockey player.

In 2002-03, he played for Wayzata High School, in the American state of Minnesota.

Coming from the junior team of the Gothiques d'Amiens, with which he had won, in 2007, the French junior championship, he made his senior debut with LHC Les Lions in 2008. In April 2011, he helped the Lions reach the final of the French D2 championship, moving the team up to Division 1. The same year, he was selected among the finalists of the Lions du Sport in the category Best Athlete in Lyon.

He then played two seasons with the Montpellier Vipers, before moving to Paris, where he played one more season with the Français Volants before hanging up his skates in 2016, at age 29.

== Bibliography ==
=== Novels ===
- — (2013). Tu montreras ma tête au peuple. Collection Blanche. Paris: Éditions Gallimard. 192pp. ISBN 978-2-07-013987-3.
- — (2015). Évariste. Collection Blanche. Paris: Éditions Gallimard. 176pp. ISBN 978-2-07-014704-5.
- — (2017). Un certain M. Piekielny. Collection Blanche. Paris: Éditions Gallimard. 272pp. ISBN 9782072741418.
- — (2021). Mon maître et mon vainqueur. Collection Blanche. Paris: Éditions Gallimard. 192pp. ISBN 9782072900945.

=== Travel writing ===
- — (2023). L’usure d’un monde. Une traversée de l'Iran. Collection Blanche. Paris: Éditions Gallimard. 160pp. ISBN 9782073026163.
- — (2025). Chagrin d'un chant inachevé. Sur la route de Che Guevara. Collection Blanche. Paris: Éditions Gallimard. 192pp. ISBN 9782070792368.
