= True team =

The true team format is meant to determine the top overall team, rather than individuals, in a track and field or swim and dive competition. In a true team meet, each team has a given number of competitors, with each competitor scoring at least one point (barring disqualification). Therefore, in a nine team meet with three competitors per event, the event champion would earn 27 points whereas the last place finisher would earn 1 point. The purpose of a true team meet is to judge which team is the best overall, rather than which team has the most top finishers.

== Minnesota ==
The Minnesota State High School Coaches Association began using a true team format to determine the top high school track and field team in 1987. In 2005, they created a true team state meet for swimming and diving. These meets are separate from the Minnesota State High School League sanctioned individual state championships. The meets have since expanded to three divisions.

Minnesota True Team State Track and Field format

- The teams are divided into eight true team regions, generally with nine teams per region
- Each team has two competitors per event in classes AA and A, and one team for every relay. (Class AAA has three competitors per event.)
- The top team from each region goes to the True Team State Meet
- A four additional wildcard teams also advance to the True Team State Meet by comparing the results of each region's second through fifth place teams place team. All sections second through fifth place teams have their times/mark entered in to a "paper meet" of 32 teams. The top four teams from this "paper meet" advance to the state meet.
- The True Team State Meet takes place on a nine-lane track. In the field events there are three flights for each events with one competitor form each team in each flight. In classes A and AA there are three heats for each race on the track (class AAA has four heats) with one athlete from each school in a different heat. In the 4X800, 1600, 3200 there is one heat on the track.
