= Relay For Life =

Fundraising event for the American Cancer Society

- Formation: May 1985; 41 years ago
- Type: Fundraising event for the American Cancer Society
- Region served: 35 Countries Around the World
- Staff Lead: Bryan Sherwood
- Volunteer Lead: Becky VanLoon
- Parent organization: American Cancer Society
- Revenue: US$66 million (Relay For Life fundraising, 2024)
- Website: https://relayforlife.org/

Relay For Life is a community-based fundraising event for the American Cancer Society (ACS). Teams of people, varying in size, alternate between walking laps and interacting with other aspects of the fundraiser. Each year, more than 5,000 Relay For Life events are held in local communities, university campuses, and as virtual campaigns over twenty countries. As the American Cancer Society's signature event, the mission of Relay For Life is to raise funds to improve cancer survival, decrease the incidence of cancer, and improve the quality of life for cancer patients and their caretakers.

A Relay For Life event is organized under a volunteer Relay Committee and implemented by volunteers. It is often organized as a multi-day public gathering, spanning all day and night in a large outdoor space, and many people bring tents and camp out around the walking tracks.

According to the Relay for Life 2024 Impact Report, 165,000 participants in the US raised $68 million. Since 1985, $6.9 billion has been raised from Relay For Life events.

== History ==
=== The start ===
Dr. Gordon Klatt, a volunteer for the American Cancer Society and a colorectal surgeon from Tacoma, Washington, wanted to find new ways to fundraise for the organization. In May 1985, he started a walking marathon to bring awareness around cancer and to raise funds for his local charity. Due to his enjoyment of marathons, Klatt walked around the track at Baker Stadium at the University of Puget Sound in Tacoma for 24 hours. The 24-hour length is stated to represent the ongoing fight someone with a cancer diagnosis participates in. Throughout the night, friends paid $25 to run or walk 30 minutes with him. He walked approximately 83 miles and raised $27,000 for the American Cancer Society. Nearly 300 of Klatt's friends, family, and patients watched as he ran and walked the course.

=== The first official relay ===
Following the event, Pat Flynn, an employee of Tacoma Public Schools, heard about Gordon's efforts and donated $10 to the cause. Klatt heard about this gesture and the two met up to discuss how this event could happen again the following year. Dr. Klatt spread the word of the event around his community to raise funds and invite participants.

Dr. Gordon Klatt and Pat Flynn, now named the "Mother of Relay", held the first official Relay For Life team event, called the City of Destiny Classic 24-hour Run Against Cancer, the next year at Stadium Bowl with 19 teams and raised $33,000.

=== Relay's growth ===
Following the second "Relay", Dr. Gordan Klatt shared his event by traveling the United States and sharing his story through Terry Zahn, a news anchor from Virginia. in 1992, the American Cancer Society National Home Office heard about Dr. Klatt and Pat Flynn's event, and Relay For Life became the organization's signature event. In 1988, Seattle's Relay For Life held the first Luminaria Ceremony. Portsmouth, England held the first Global Relay For Life in 1997. The money raised was given to Cancer Research UK.

From these beginnings, Relay For Life grew into a global movement and the American Cancer Society’s signature fundraiser. Over the past four decades, it has raised more than $7 billion in the fight against cancer.

The relay went virtual in 2020, before it went live again the next year. In 2025, Relay For Life celebrated its 40th anniversary under the theme "40 Years of Impact," reflecting on the progress made in cancer prevention, research, and survivorship, while recommitting to the goal of ending cancer as we know it, for everyone.

== Features ==
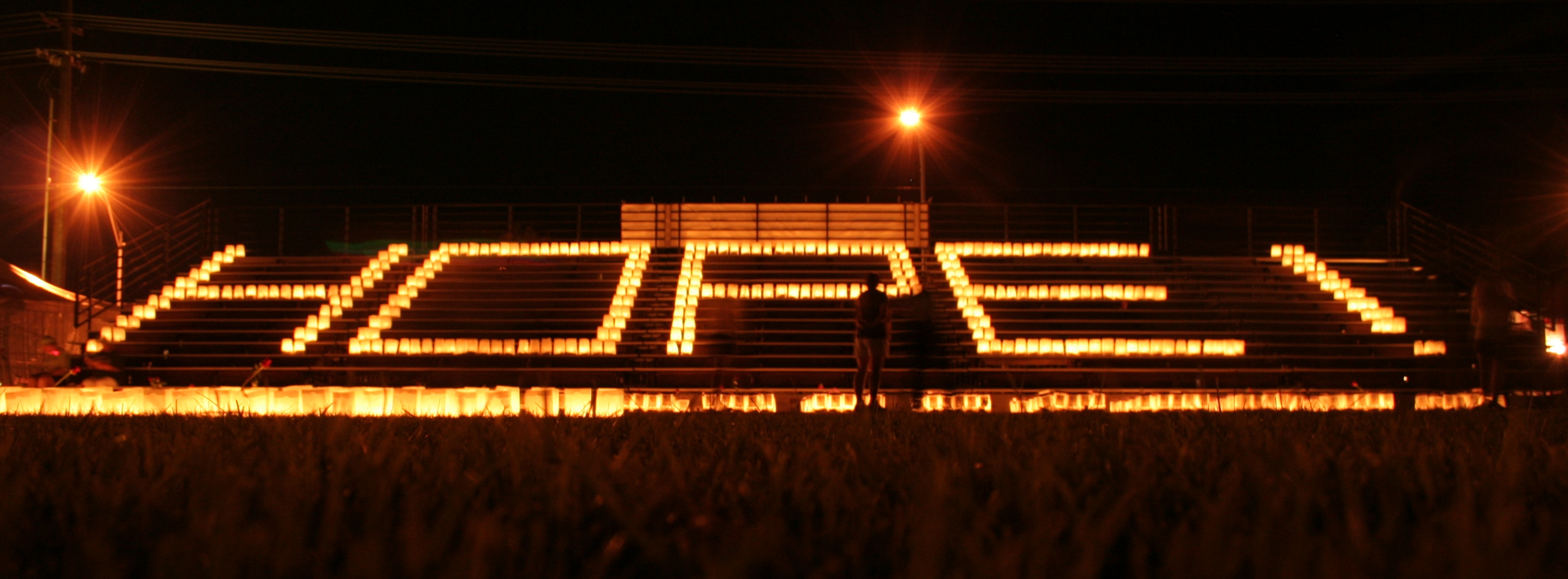
Luminaries at night

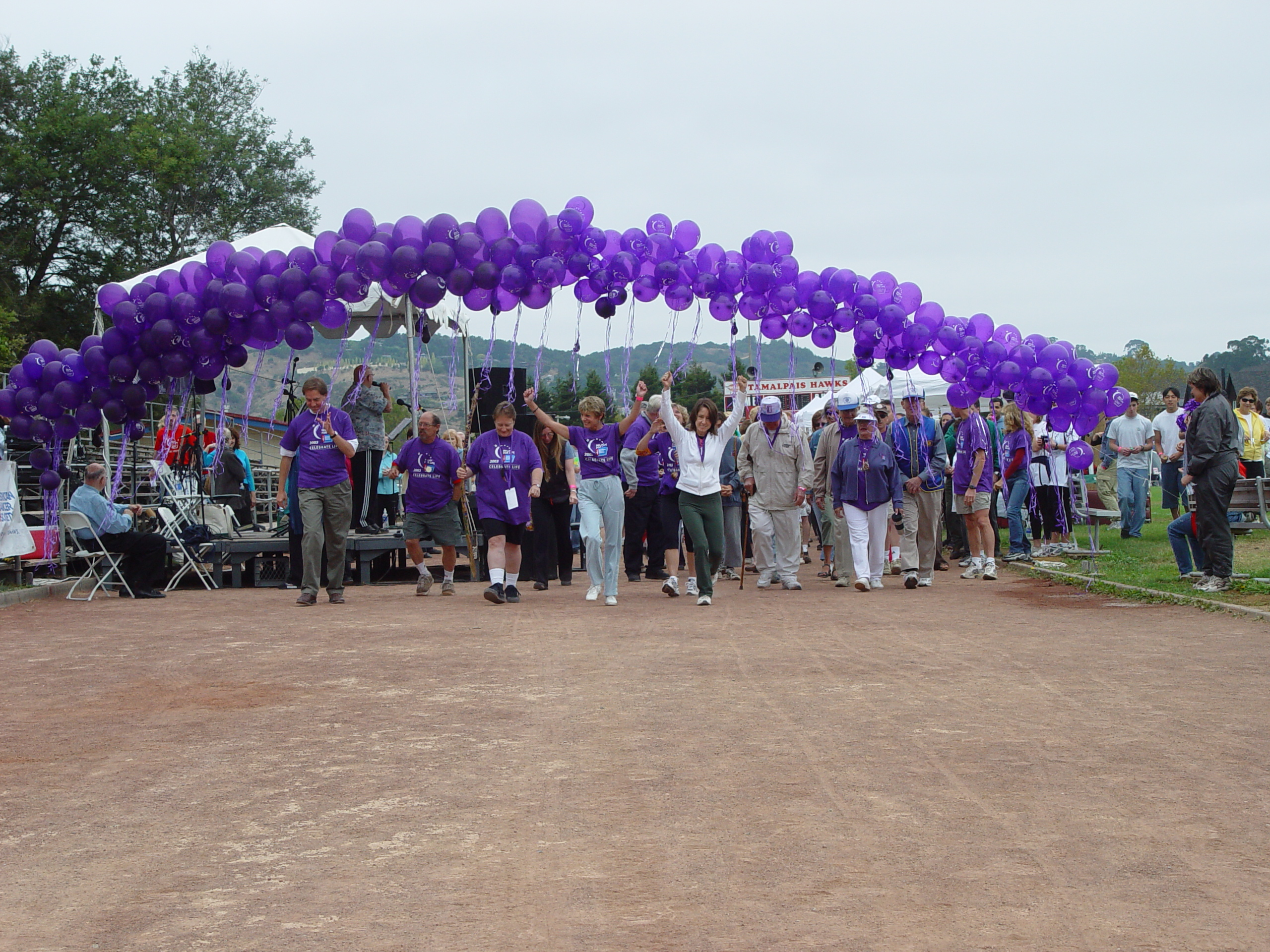
The start of a Survivor's Lap

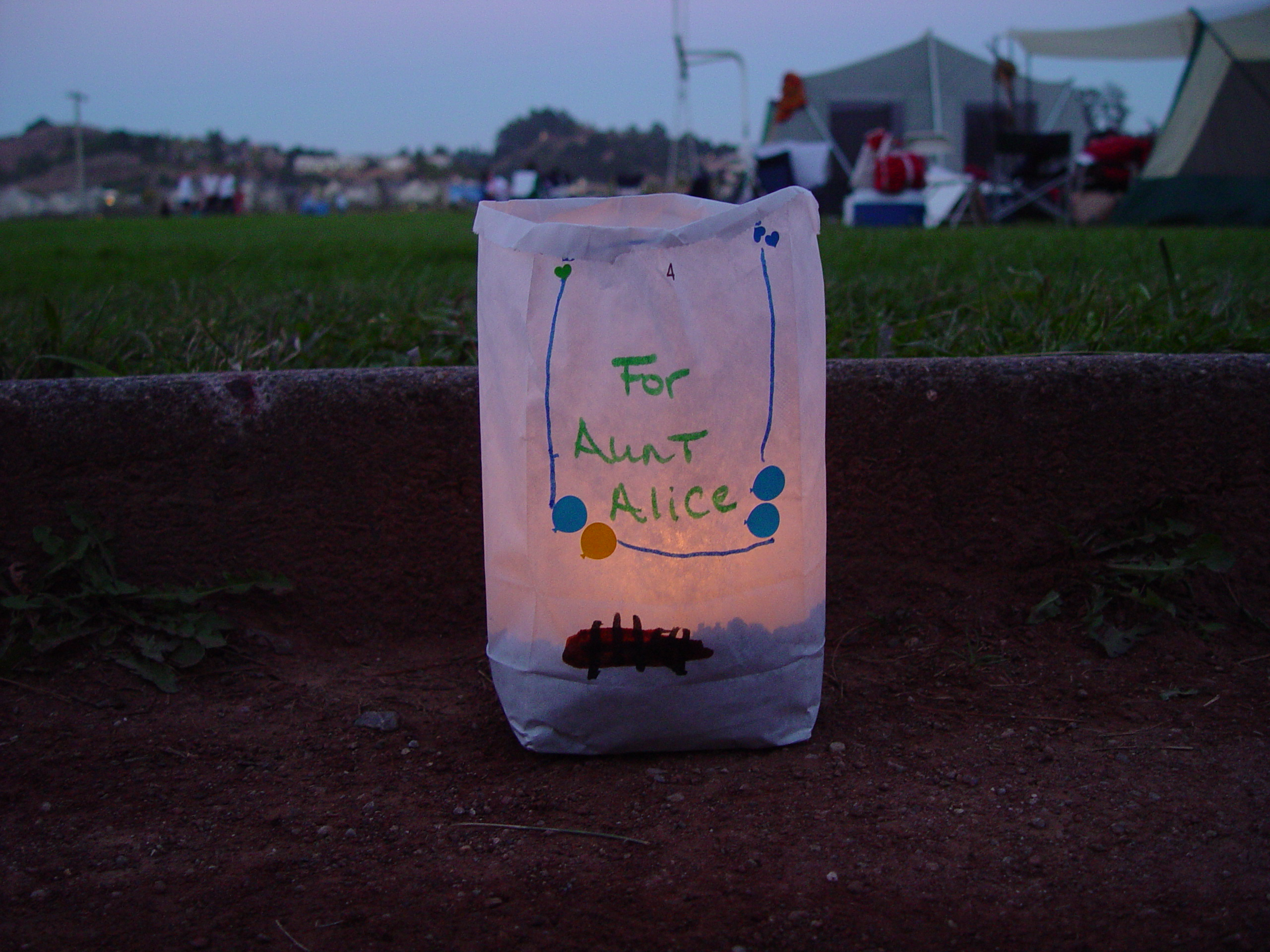
Close-up of a luminaria placed at a Relay for Life

Although all Relays vary, there are a few common features:

- A Survivor Dinner.
- A Survivor Lap, which starts the Relay event.
- An Opening Lap, in which all the participants take a lap around the track.
- A Luminaria Ceremony, usually with a candlelight vigil.
- A Closing Ceremony, including a final lap for all participants. Awards are given to teams for various achievements, such as most laps walked and most money raised.
- A "Fight Back" Ceremony, in which participants pledge to take specific actions against cancer.

=== Survivor Lap and Survivor Dinner ===
The American Cancer Society defines a cancer survivor as anyone who has been diagnosed with cancer. At most Relay events, a Survivor Dinner is held for survivors in the community before the event. The Survivor Lap, which is often the first lap of a Relay event, is used to identify the survivors. At some events, survivors are invited to speak at Relay events to encourage those with cancer.

=== Opening lap ===
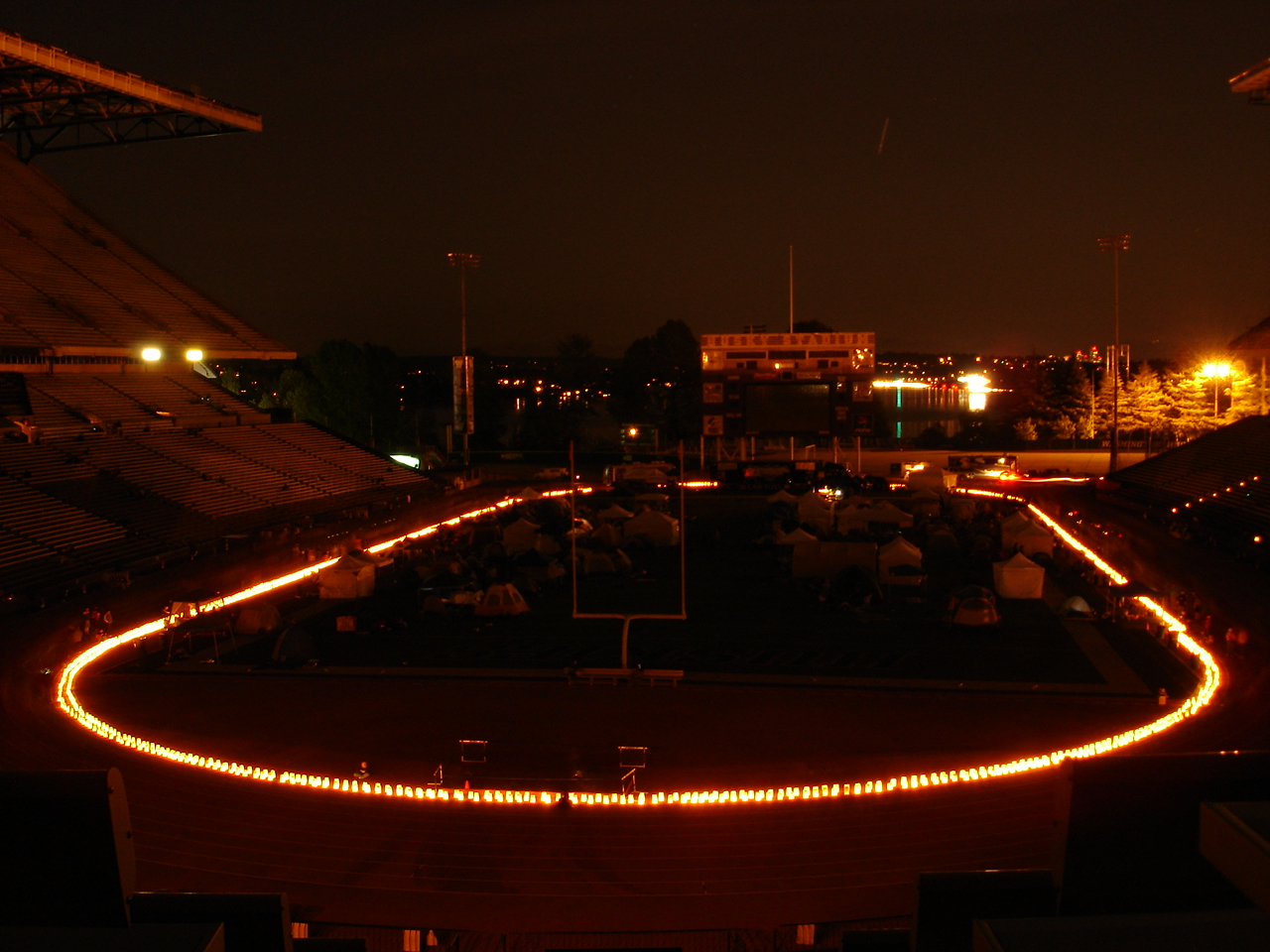
Luminaria Ceremony at the University of Washington

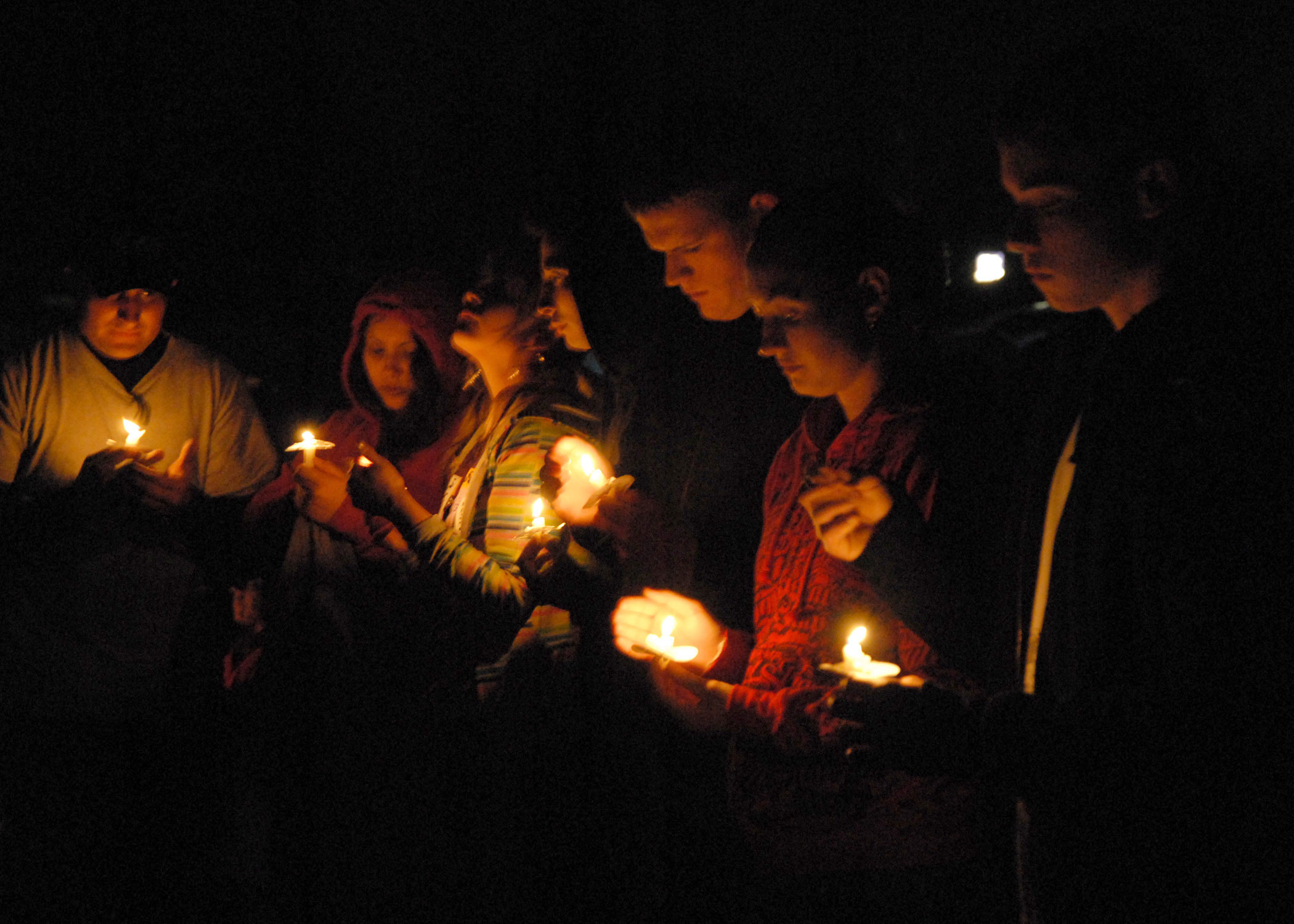
Participants in the Relay For Life North Whidbey hold candles in honor and remembrance of cancer survivors and victims at the Oak Harbor Middle School.

Following the Survivor Lap, the Opening Lap allows all participants to walk the track to kickstart the event.

=== Luminaria ceremony ===
At Relay For Life, participants celebrate survivors and remember those lost to the disease. When the sun sets, the ceremony takes place and participants are asked to gather and honor those who have survived, are fighting, or have died from cancer. To honor these people, Luminaria bags, paper bags with a candle inside, are decorated by participants and placed around the track. At some relay events, a slideshow is played with pictures of cancer patients with songs and readings are delivered.

=== Closing ceremony ===
The closing ceremony, held toward the end of relay events, is when participants pledge to take action and spread awareness of cancer research, treatments, and prevention. Participants are encouraged to hold events in the community to increase awareness of smoking cessation, routine screenings, general cancer awareness and volunteer opportunities. A representative from the American Cancer Society Cancer Action Network (ACS CAN) may come to a Relay event and speak about cancer prevention bills and legislation that are trying to be passed as well as encourage ACS CAN participation.

=== "Fight Back" ceremony ===
At this time, participants make a pledge to make a personal effort to fight against cancer.

== Gold Together for Childhood Cancer ==
Gold Together for Childhood Cancer is a national Relay For Life initiative that seeks to empower individuals and communities to raise awareness and funds specifically for childhood cancer research, advocacy, and support services. Founded by pediatric brain cancer survivor Cole Eicher and his mother, the initiative began as a way to give children and families affected by cancer a stronger voice within the American Cancer Society’s fundraising programs.

Gold Together teams are identified by gold-themed branding, honoring the gold ribbon symbol for childhood cancer awareness. Participants can designate their fundraising efforts to benefit ACS’s restricted fund for childhood cancer, which supports research grants, patient navigation services, and advocacy focused on pediatric cancer issues.

The initiative has grown in visibility through community engagement and media coverage. In 2024, Relay For Life of Greene County, New York, featured a Gold Together team led by local high school student and cancer survivor Tatum Lampman. Her team helped promote childhood cancer awareness among youth and raised significant funds for pediatric cancer programs.

== Funds ==
Funds raised through Relay For Life events benefit the American Cancer Society.

The American Cancer Society states that money raised through Relay For Life events is given to the following efforts:

- Research grants and research programs
- Prevention programs
- Community and patient support programs
- Detection and treatment programs
- Fundraising
- Construction of Hope Lodge

The American Cancer Society conducted a study in 2024, the following was noted for how funds from the event assisted in breakthrough research:

- $792,000 - Xiaomin Bao, PhD, at Regents of the University of Minnesota for Prostate Cancer
- $792,000 - Esra Akbay, PhD, at The University of Texas Southwestern Medical Center for Lung Cancer
- $778,000 - Joshua Andersen, PhD, at the University of Utah for Colorectal Cancer
- $217,500 - Lesley Ferguson, PhD, at Cold Spring Harbor Laboratory for Pancreatic Cancer

== Global Relay For Life ==
Global Relay For Life (GRFL) is the international extension of the American Cancer Society’s Relay For Life program, supporting cancer-focused organizations in more than 35 countries and 3,000 communities. These global partnerships aim to empower communities worldwide to host Relay events tailored to local cultures while upholding the shared mission to celebrate survivors, remember those lost, and raise funds to fight cancer.

The first official Global Relay For Life event was held in 1997 in Portsmouth, England, in support of Cancer Research UK. Since then, GRFL has helped expand Relay’s presence across six continents, gaining millions of participants through both community events and virtual campaigns.

=== Countries and their names ===
Many countries participate in Relay For Life, often using localized names and partnering with national cancer organizations. Below is a list of countries, their event names, and associated organizations:

Global Relay For Life Partners
Country	Event name	Cancer Organization	Reference
Argentina	Relay For Life	Liga Argentina de Lucha Contra el Cáncer (LALCEC)	
Australia	Relay For Life	Cancer Council Australia	
Belgium	Levensloop (Dutch), Relais pour la Vie (French)	Stichting tegen Kanker / Fondation contre le Cancer	
Bermuda	Relay For Life of Bermuda	Bermuda Cancer and Health Centre	
Canada	Relay For Life / Relais pour la Vie	Canadian Cancer Society / Société canadienne du cancer	
Columbia	Relay For Life	Liga Colombiana Contra El Cancer	
Denmark	Stafet For Livet	Danish Cancer Society	
Dominica	Relay For Life	Dominica Cancer Society	
France	Relais pour la Vie	Ligue nationale contre le cancer	
Guyana	Relay For Life	Guyana Cancer Foundation	
Honduras	Relevo por la Vida	Asociación Hondureña de Lucha Contra el Cáncer	
Iceland	Relay For Life	Icelandic Cancer Society	
India	Relay For Life	Indian Cancer Society	
Ireland	Relay For Life	Irish Cancer Society	
Israel	Relay For Life	Israel Cancer Association	
Jamaica	Relay For Life	Jamaica Cancer Society	
Japan	リレー・フォー・ライフ (Relay For Life)	Japan Cancer Society	
Kenya	Relay For Life	Kenya Cancer Association (KENCASA)	
Luxembourg	Relais pour la Vie	Fondation Cancer	
Malaysia	Relay For Life	National Cancer Society Malaysia (NCSM)	
Netherlands	SamenLoop voor Hoop	KWF Kankerbestrijding	
New Zealand	Relay For Life	Cancer Society of New Zealand	
Norway	Stafett for livet	Norwegian Cancer Society (Kreftforeningen)	
Philippines	Relay For Life	Philippine Cancer Society	
Portugal	Um Dia Pela Vida	Liga Portuguesa Contra o Cancro	
Qatar	Relay For Life	Qatar Cancer Society	
Singapore	Relay For Life	Singapore Cancer Society	
South Africa	Relay For Life	Cancer Association of South Africa (CANSA)	
St. Lucia	Relay For Life	St Lucia Cancer Society	
Switzerland	Relay For Life	Swiss Cancer League (Krebsliga)	
Sweden	Stafett för livet	Swedish Cancer Society (Cancerfonden)	
Trinidad & Tobago	Relay For Life	Trinidad & Tobago Cancer Society	
United Arab Emirates	Relay For Life	Friends of Cancer Patients (FOCP)	
Uganda	Relay For Life	Uganda Cancer Society	
United Kingdom	Relay For Life	Cancer Research UK	
United States	Relay For Life	American Cancer Society	
Uruguay	Relevo por la Vida	Fundación Peluffo Giguens	
Zambia	Relay For Life	Zambian Cancer Society	
Zimbabwe	Relay For Life	Cancer Association of Zimbabwe	

== Relay For Life Hall of Fame ==
The Relay For Life Hall of Fame honors volunteers and staff whose leadership, innovation, and dedication have had a lasting impact on the Relay For Life movement. Inductees are recognized for advancing the mission of the American Cancer Society through exceptional service at the local, national, or global level.

=== Notable inductees ===
- Gordy Klatt (1942–2014), inducted in 1997. Klatt was the founder of Relay For Life, having raised $27,000 by running and walking for 24 hours in Tacoma, Washington, in 1985.
- Pat Flynn (1938–2018), inducted in 1998. Known as the “Mother of Relay,” Flynn was the first team captain at the inaugural Relay and helped scale the program internationally.
- Terry Zahn (1946–2000), inducted in 1999. A television news anchor from Virginia, Zahn produced early Relay promotional videos that were shared nationally, helping Relay expand across the U.S.
- Phylecia Wilson, inducted in 2001. A long-time volunteer leader, Wilson helped launch Relay in Gwinnett County, Georgia, and served on numerous national and global advisory groups.
- Dr. Robert "Bob" Brodell, inducted in 2005. A dermatologist and advocate, Brodell co-led efforts for Relay-focused advocacy events in Washington, D.C., including the "Celebration on the Hill."
- Jeff Ross, inducted in 2009. After losing his mother to cancer, Ross became a prominent speaker and fundraiser in North Carolina, earning national recognition for his commitment.
- Reuel Johnson, inducted in 2013. A 40-year American Cancer Society staff member, Johnson led the Relay Business Unit and played a key role in expanding Relay globally.
- Laura McCormick, inducted in 2016. McCormick held numerous leadership roles at the local, regional, and global levels and chaired the Global Relay For Life volunteer team.
- Joe Gillette, inducted in 2023. A Brooklyn-based volunteer, Gillette founded Relay First Lap and developed national engagement tools like the Relay fundraising calendar.
- Thelma Suson (1951–2024), inducted in 2024. A cancer survivor and Delta Air Lines team captain, Suson played a major role in expanding Relay’s global presence and training survivor spokespeople worldwide.

== See also ==
- American Cancer Society
- Making Strides Against Breast Cancer
