= Gordon Klatt =

American physician

- Born: 1942
- Died: 2014
- Education: University of Minnesota Medical School
- Occupation: Surgeon
- Known for: Founder of the American Cancer Society's Relay For Life
- Medical career
- Sub-specialties: Colorectal cancer and colorectal surgery
- Awards: Tacoma Rotary Club No. 8 Community Service Award, St. Thomas University Humanitarian Award, Stillwater Area High School Distinguished Alumni Award

Gordon Klatt, M.D. (1942-2014) was a practicing surgeon in Tacoma, Washington, and the founder of the American Cancer Society's Relay For Life.

He had special expertise in two areas, including colorectal cancer and colorectal surgery. He was credited as the founder of the American Cancer Society's Relay For Life.

== Background and education ==
After serving three years as a United States Army surgeon, Dr. Klatt returned to school and became a colorectal specialist. He received his medical degree in 1968 from the University of Minnesota Medical School. Dr. Klatt completed his internship at Fitzsimons Army Medical Center in Aurora, Colorado, his residency at Madigan Army Medical Center in Tacoma, Washington, and his fellowship at the University of Minnesota. He is a Fellow in the American College of Surgeons.

== Relay For Life ==
In the mid-1980s, Dr. Klatt expressed interest in helping raise funds for his local American Cancer Society. He decided he would raise money by doing something he enjoyed—running marathons. In May 1985, Dr. Klatt circled the track for a total of more than 83 miles at Baker Stadium at the University of Puget Sound in Tacoma for 24 hours. Friends and family donated $25 to run or walk certain lengths with him. That year, he raised $27,000. While he ran, nearly 300 friends, family, and patients watched as he ran and walked the track. While he was running, Dr. Klatt began making plans on how the event could be even bigger in future years. Throughout the next year, he, along with an event committee, developed plans for the City of Destiny Classic 24-Hour Run Against Cancer. In 1986, 19 teams took part in the first team relay event and raised $33,000. Since then, Dr. Klatt’s idea has turned into more than 5,200 Relay For Life events across the United States that have raised nearly $5 billion. The American Cancer Society also licenses twenty non-governmental cancer organizations in other countries to hold Relay For Life events.

== Cancer diagnosis ==
In March 2012, Dr. Klatt was diagnosed with stomach cancer, and he participated that year in Relay For Life for the first time as a cancer survivor. When he was diagnosed, he received a number of supportive letters and e-mails from around the world, and he spoke during the opening ceremonies at the Relay For Life of Tacoma, Washington. He died August 3, 2014, at the age of 71 from heart failure after battling stomach cancer.

== Awards and recognition ==
Dr. Klatt has been recognized by a number of organizations including the Tacoma Rotary Club No. 8 with their Community Service Award and St. Thomas University, his alma mater, with the Humanitarian Award. His high school alma mater, Stillwater Area High School in Stillwater, Minnesota, recognized him in 1995 with the Distinguished Alumni Award. Dr. Klatt was inducted into the Relay For Life Hall of Fame in 2007. In 2008, he was recognized with a Community Impact Award from the American Society of Colon and Rectal Surgeons. He has also been honored with Patients’ Choice Awards from PatientsChoice.org in 2009, 2012 and 2013. In 2013, Dr. Klatt and other Relay For Life volunteers in Tacoma were recognized in the Tacoma Hometown Heroes program with the Community Partnership Award for their 27 years of dedication to the Relay For Life movement.
