= National Register of Historic Places listings in Washington County, Minnesota =

Location of Washington County in Minnesota

This is a list of the National Register of Historic Places listings in Washington County, Minnesota. It is intended to be a complete list of the properties and districts on the National Register of Historic Places in Washington County, Minnesota, United States. The locations of National Register properties and districts for which the latitude and longitude coordinates are included below, may be seen in an online map.

There are 44 properties and districts listed on the National Register in the county, including one National Historic Landmark. A supplementary list includes two additional sites that were formerly on the National Register.

This National Park Service list is complete through NPS recent listings posted April 3, 2026.

== History ==
Many of the historic properties are associated with the timber industry, which began just after treaties with the Dakota and Ojibwe Indians were signed in 1837. The first sawmill in the state was established in Marine Mills (now Marine on St. Croix) in 1839. Other towns along the St. Croix River were associated with the lumber trade: Stillwater, Lakeland, and Point Douglas. Many of the houses in Stillwater are associated with wealthy lumbermen. Railroads and other industries also played a part in the development of the county.

Several of these properties are listed in the "Washington County Multiple Resource Area".

== Current listings ==
	Name on the Register	Image	Date listed	Location	City or town	Description
1	Moritz Bergstein Shoddy Mill and Warehouse	Moritz Bergstein Shoddy Mill and Warehouse	March 5, 2008 (#08000133)	805 S. Main St. 45°03′05″N 92°48′05″W	Stillwater	Fabric recycling and mattress manufacturing facility active ca.-1890–1910, an embodiment of Minnesota's early Jewish immigrants and their frequent participation in the waste materials trade. Moved to current site in November 2012.
2	Erastus Bolles House	Erastus Bolles House	April 20, 1982 (#82003072)	1741 Stagecoach Trail; 44°55′25″N 92°48′05″W	Afton	One of the original Greek Revival houses—built in 1856—of a typical small Washington County settlement clustered around a commercial venture, though one that never progressed to formal platting.
3	Bridge No. 5721	Bridge No. 5721	July 13, 1998 (#98000717)	Gateway State Trail over Manning Ave. 45°06′16″N 92°51′54″W	Stillwater Township	Truss bridge rare for its wrought iron construction and ornamental detailing, built in 1877 before the transition to steel, refurbished and erected in Koochiching County in 1937, and relocated to present site in 2011.
4	Chicago, Milwaukee and St. Paul Freight House	Chicago, Milwaukee and St. Paul Freight House	July 13, 1977 (#77000773)	233–335 Water St. 45°03′18″N 92°48′16″W	Stillwater	1883 passenger and freight depot with a telegraph and Railway Express Agency office, significant in local transportation, commerce, communication, and engineering. Also a contributing property to the Stillwater Commercial Historic District. Now a restaurant.
5	John Copas House	John Copas House	July 21, 1980 (#80002176)	19489 St. Croix Tr. N. 45°13′52″N 92°45′48″W	Copas	Circa-1880 house of an early settler and leading figure in a community platted in 1857 and ultimately named in his honor.
6	Cushing Hotel	Cushing Hotel	January 17, 1985 (#85000098)	3291 St. Croix Trail Ave. S. 44°54′03″N 92°46′58″W	Afton	1867 hotel exemplifying the commercial lodging common to mid-19th-century river towns. Now the Afton House Inn.
7	John T. Cyphers House	John T. Cyphers House	September 10, 1971 (#71000442)	661 Quinnell Ave. N. 44°57′30″N 92°45′59″W	Lakeland	Unusual 1858 house with Northern European-style masonry of mortared unsplit boulders, particularly rare in a logging region with plentiful lumber.
8	District No. 34 School	District No. 34 School	May 19, 2014 (#14000220)	13728 St. Croix Trail S. 44°45′05″N 92°49′01″W	Denmark Township	Representative example of a rural one-room schoolhouse of the mid-19th-century, active circa-1852–1946.
9	Johannes Erickson House	Johannes Erickson House	June 17, 1976 (#76001078)	14020 195th St. 45°13′54″N 92°49′16″W	Scandia	1868 gambrel-roofed log cabin, a rare surviving example of a style brought to Minnesota by Swedish immigrants from Dalsland and Småland. Now part of a museum alongside the Hay Lake School.
10	John P. Furber House	John P. Furber House	April 20, 1982 (#82003074)	7310 Lamar Ave. 44°50′36″N 92°52′55″W	Cottage Grove	1871 house built the same year Furber formally platted the twenty-year-old settlement of Cottage Grove, representing a phenomenon in early Washington County towns of platting well after communities had already been established.
11	Newington Gilbert House	Newington Gilbert House	April 20, 1982 (#82003073)	1678 Stagecoach Trail; 44°55′29″N 92°48′11″W	Afton	One of the original Greek Revival houses—built in 1864—of a typical small Washington County settlement clustered around a commercial venture, though one that never progressed to formal platting.
12	Grey Cloud Lime Kiln	Grey Cloud Lime Kiln	December 18, 1978 (#78001568)	10398 Grey Cloud Island Trail; 44°47′54″N 92°58′41″W	Cottage Grove	Well preserved example of an early lime kiln, an important industry among Minnesota pioneers, which produced lime for construction and fertilizer ca. 1850–1900. Collapsed on June 20, 2014.
13	Hay Lake School	Hay Lake School	July 1, 1970 (#70000312)	14020 195th St. 45°13′54″N 92°49′13″W	Scandia	Scandia's first school building, in use 1895–1962. Now part of a Washington County Historical Society museum alongside the Johannes Erickson House.
14	Roscoe Hersey House	Roscoe Hersey House	February 19, 1982 (#82003084)	416 S. 4th St. 45°03′09″N 92°48′33″W	Stillwater	1880 Eastlake/Queen Anne house of a key figure in Stillwater's lumber and mercantile development, the son and local representative of Isaac Staples' Maine-based business partner Samuel F. Hersey.
15	Mitchell Jackson Farmhouse	Mitchell Jackson Farmhouse	February 19, 1982 (#82003075)	16376 7th St. Lane S. 44°56′14″N 92°46′34″W	Lakeland	Farmhouse of early settler Mitchell Y. Jackson (1816–1900), remembered for an informative and wide-ranging diary kept 1852–1863.
16	Capt. Austin Jenks House	Capt. Austin Jenks House	April 20, 1982 (#82003085)	504 S. 5th St. 45°03′05″N 92°48′36″W	Stillwater	1871 house of a prominent river pilot involved with timber rafting on the St. Croix and Mississippi.
41	Lake St. Croix Overlook	Lake St. Croix Overlook	December 27, 2007 (#07001318)	Lookout Trail near 63rd St. N. 45°02′26″N 92°47′45″W	Oak Park Heights	Exemplary early wayside rest developed 1938–39 by the Minnesota Department of Highways. Also noted for its National Park Service rustic design by landscape architect Arthur R. Nichols.
18	Albert Lammers House	Albert Lammers House	April 20, 1982 (#82003076)	1306 S. 3rd St. 45°02′40″N 92°48′24″W	Stillwater	Circa-1893 house associated with brothers Albert and George Lammers, who expanded the state's lumber industry into northwest Minnesota. Also noted for the most elaborate Queen Anne architecture in Stillwater.
19	Log Cabin	Log Cabin	December 27, 2007 (#07001317)	15021 60th St. N. 45°02′07″N 92°48′07″W	Oak Park Heights	1932 restaurant noted for its quaint log cabin motif designed to attract the first generation of motorists and its associations with the St. Croix Valley's Prohibition-era roadhouse network. Now Phil's Tara Hideaway.
20	Marine Mill Site	Marine Mill Site	January 26, 1970 (#70000311)	Judd St. 45°11′54″N 92°46′06″W	Marine on St. Croix	Site of Minnesota's first commercial sawmill, active 1839–1888, nucleus of the region's lumber industry and a major landing on its crucial transportation route. Also a contributing property to the Marine on St. Croix Historic District. Now a Minnesota Historical Society site.
21	Marine on St. Croix Historic District	Marine on St. Croix Historic District	June 28, 1974 (#74001043)	Roughly bounded by the St. Croix River, railroad tracks, and Kennedy and Spruce Sts. 45°11′55″N 92°46′11″W	Marine on St. Croix	Mid-19th-century river town, birthplace of the Minnesota lumber industry, with a well-preserved business district and residential areas of its Yankee upper class and Swedish working class.
22	Ivory McKusick House	Ivory McKusick House	April 20, 1982 (#82003077)	504 N. 2nd St. 45°03′37″N 92°48′34″W	Stillwater	Distinctive 1868 Second Empire house associated with an influential local family. Ivory McCusick was a notable lumberman, surveyor, and businessman while his brother John platted Stillwater and founded its first sawmill.
23	Minnesota Territorial/State Prison Warden's House	Minnesota Territorial/State Prison Warden's House	December 17, 1974 (#74001044)	602 N. Main St. 45°03′42″N 92°48′27″W	Stillwater	Prison warden's residence used 1853–1914, only surviving structure of the prison's Minnesota Territory period and chief remnant of its statehood years. Now the Warden's House Museum.
24	John and Martin Mower House and Arcola Mill Site	John and Martin Mower House and Arcola Mill Site	June 17, 1980 (#80000407)	12905 Arcola Trail N. 45°08′17″N 92°45′06″W	Arcola	Exemplary 1847 Greek Revival house and remnants of one of the first St. Croix Valley sawmills, nucleus of an early lumber town. Now an education and event venue.
25	Nelson School	Nelson School	October 25, 1979 (#79001257)	1018 S. 1st St. 45°02′48″N 92°48′14″W	Stillwater	Oldest standing school building in Stillwater, built in 1897 and also noted for its Neoclassical/Georgian Revival architecture by Orff & Guilbert.
26	Capt. John Oliver House	Capt. John Oliver House	December 16, 1977 (#77000772)	1544 Rivercrest Rd. 44°58′16″N 92°46′20″W	Lakeland	1849 house of one of Lakeland's founding families, an early settler whose sons helped organize the town and its school system. Also one of Minnesota's few surviving Greek Revival houses of its era.
27	Pest House	Pest House	June 17, 1980 (#80000408)	9033 Fairy Falls Rd. 45°04′48″N 92°48′20″W	Stillwater Township	Community quarantine facility used circa-1872–1910, an example of a common public health measure of the late-19th/early-20th centuries. Now a private home.
28	Point Douglas-St. Louis River Road Bridge	Point Douglas-St. Louis River Road Bridge	February 24, 1975 (#75001033)	Off County Highway 5; 45°04′32″N 92°49′44″W	Stillwater Township	1863 arch bridge built on the Point Douglas to Superior Military Road, noted for its stone engineering and as a remnant of Minnesota's early government roads.
29	St. Croix Boom Company House and Barn	St. Croix Boom Company House and Barn	June 3, 1980 (#80000409)	9666 N. St. Croix Trail; 45°05′11″N 92°47′06″W	Stillwater Township	Only surviving buildings associated with the St. Croix Boom Site, built circa 1885 for a superintendent serving 1871–1905.
30	St. Croix Boom Site	St. Croix Boom Site	November 13, 1966 (#66000407)	3 miles north of Stillwater on the St. Croix River; 45°05′04″N 92°47′11″W	Stillwater Township	Site of Minnesota's earliest, longest-serving, and most important log boom, where lumber was stored and sorted 1856–1914 at the terminus of the St. Croix River's great log drives. Now a highway wayside.
31	St. Croix Lumber Mills-Stillwater Manufacturing Company	St. Croix Lumber Mills-Stillwater Manufacturing Company	April 20, 1982 (#82003081)	318 N. Main; 45°03′36″N 92°48′27″W	Stillwater	1850 stone powerhouse—the only surviving industrial structure associated with major Stillwater-based businessman Isaac Staples (1816–1898)—and adjacent 1900 factory.
32	St. Croix River Access Site	St. Croix River Access Site	August 23, 1984 (#84001712)	Address restricted	Stillwater Township	Circa-800–1700 habitation site with a large quantity of stone tool artifacts, potentially illuminating Late Woodland period cultural relationships, lithic technology, and resource use.
33	William Sauntry House and Recreation Hall	William Sauntry House and Recreation Hall	April 20, 1982 (#82003080)	626 N. 4th St. and 625 N. 5th St. 45°03′40″N 92°48′46″W	Stillwater	1891 Queen Anne house of a prosperous lumberman, with a unique Moorish Revival recreation hall added in 1902. Now a bed & breakfast.
34	Schilling Archeological District	Schilling Archeological District	December 22, 1978 (#78001569)	Address restricted	Cottage Grove	Habitation site and mound group spanning 1000 BCE to 1700 CE, noted for a rare Early Woodland Period component, Middle Mississippian cultural influences, and potential to show climatic adaptations over time.
35	Cordenio Severance House	Cordenio Severance House	June 3, 1976 (#76001077)	6940 Keats Ave. S. 44°50′56″N 92°54′17″W	Cottage Grove	Opulent country home of attorney Cordenio Severance (1862–1925), remodeled in 1917 by architect Cass Gilbert and also known as Cedarhurst. Now an event venue.
36	Benjamin B. Sheffield House	Benjamin B. Sheffield House	June 3, 1980 (#80002177)	4 Croixside Rd. 45°09′18″N 92°45′32″W	May Township	1922 log house also known as Croixsyde, significant as one of the earliest summer homes on the St. Croix River and for its rustic architecture.
37	Soo Line High Bridge	Soo Line High Bridge	August 22, 1977 (#77000056)	Over the St. Croix River, 5 miles north of Stillwater; 45°07′23″N 92°44′39″W	Stillwater	Dramatic 2,600-foot-long (790 m), 184-foot-high (56 m) multi-span steel arch bridge built 1910–11, noted for its exceptional dimensions, beauty, innovative engineering techniques, and importance. Extends into St. Croix County, Wisconsin.
38	Charles Spangenberg Farmstead	Charles Spangenberg Farmstead	December 5, 1978 (#78001570)	9431 Dale Rd. 44°52′33″N 92°54′52″W	Woodbury	One of Washington County's few remaining 19th-century farmsteads, with an 1871 farmhouse, circa-1875 granary, and circa-1887 barn.
39	State Prison Historic District	State Prison Historic District	July 10, 1986 (#86001574)	5500 Pickett Ave. 45°01′40″N 92°47′15″W	Bayport	Maximum-security prison complex with 22 contributing properties built 1910–14, the influential American debut of a central-spine-and-crosstree design originated at Fresnes Prison in France.
40	Stillwater Bridge	Stillwater Bridge	May 25, 1989 (#89000445)	Minnesota Highway 36/Wisconsin Highway 64 over the St. Croix River; 45°03′23″N 92°48′12″W	Stillwater	Rare example of a vertical-lift highway bridge based on a Waddell & Harrington design, built in 1931. Extends into St. Croix County, Wisconsin.
41	Stillwater Commercial Historic District	Stillwater Commercial Historic District	March 26, 1992 (#92000288)	Vicinity of Main, 2nd, and Chestnut Sts. 45°03′21″N 92°48′21″W	Stillwater	11-block central business district reflecting the economic and architectural diversity of a prosperous lumbering and manufacturing center, with 63 contributing properties built 1860–1940.
42	Henry Stussi House	Henry Stussi House	April 20, 1982 (#82003082)	9097 Mendel Rd. 45°04′50″N 92°50′45″W	Stillwater Township	One of Washington County's finest rural houses, built in the late 1870s from a Palliser, Palliser & Company pattern book for a notable figure in the local milling and ice industries.
43	Washington County Courthouse	Washington County Courthouse	August 26, 1971 (#71000443)	101 W. Pine St. 45°03′06″N 92°48′27″W	Stillwater	Built in 1870, nominated as Minnesota's oldest functioning courthouse and one of its few surviving examples of monumental public architecture from the mid-19th century. Now an exhibition hall.
44	Mortimer Webster House	Mortimer Webster House	April 20, 1982 (#82003083)	435 S. Broadway; 45°03′11″N 92°48′16″W	Stillwater	Stillwater's leading example of Italianate architecture, built 1865–66 for a notable local entrepreneur.

== Former listings ==
	Name on the Register	Image	Date listed	Date removed	Location	City or town	Description
1	Heath Summer Residence		February 12, 1980 (#80002178)	January 14, 1987	Arcola Tr.	Stillwater Township	1911 summer home, one of the earliest on the St. Croix River. Destroyed by arson on July 20, 1986, during a period of vacancy.
2	Territorial/State Prison	Territorial/State Prison	April 20, 1982 (#82003079)	January 7, 2005	Main and Laurel Sts.	Stillwater	Prison's manual labor complex, built 1884–1898. Destroyed by arson on September 3, 2002.

== See also ==
- List of National Historic Landmarks in Minnesota
- National Register of Historic Places listings in Minnesota
