= Isaac Staples' Sawmill =

- St. Croix Lumber Mills--Stillwater Manufacturing Company
- U.S. National Register of Historic Places
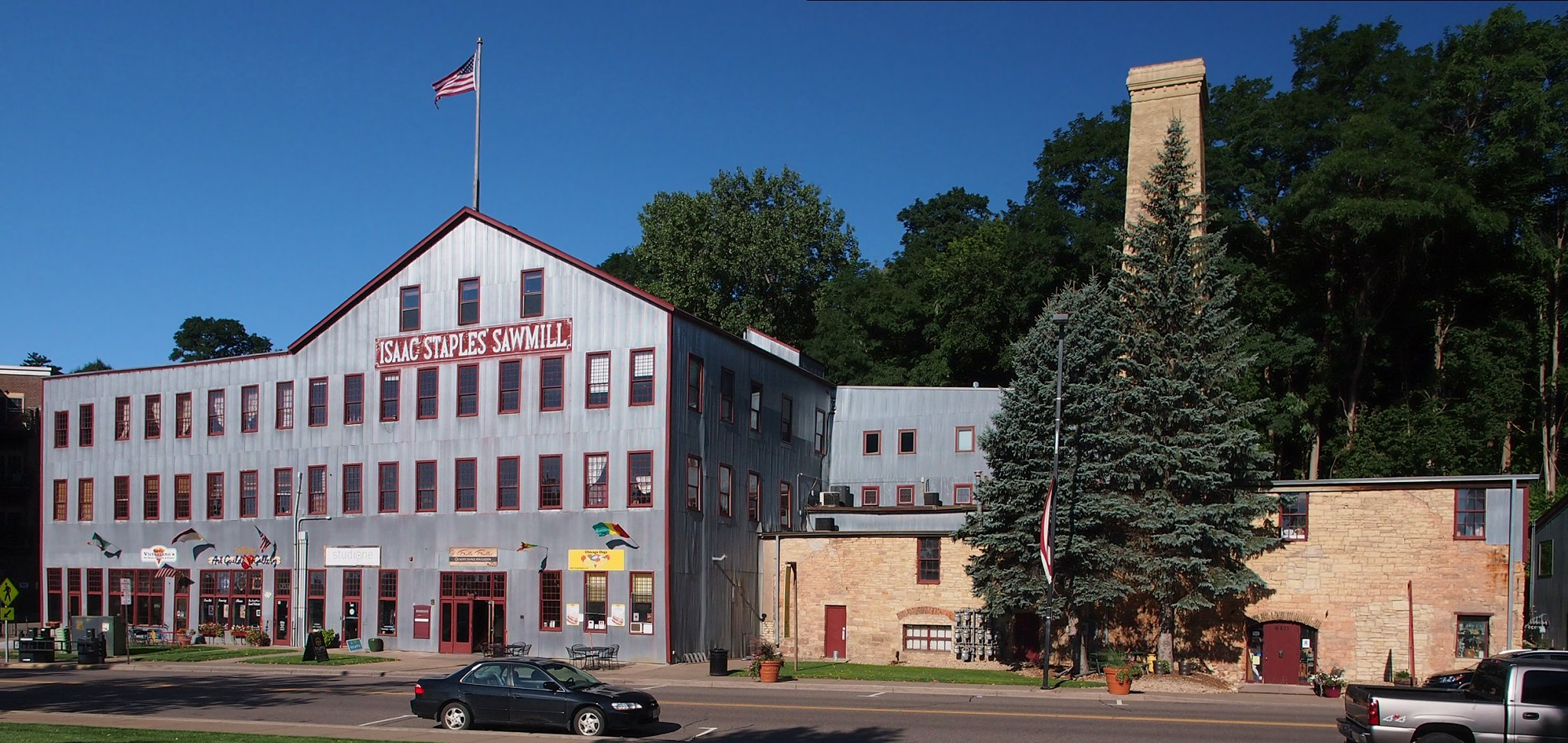
- Isaac Staples' Sawmill from the east

- Location within Minnesota Location within the United States
- Interactive map showing the location of Isaac Staples' Sawmill
- Location: 318 North Main Street, Stillwater, Minnesota
- Coordinates: 45°3′35″N 92°48′27″W
- Area: Less than one acre
- Built: 1850, 1900
- MPS: Washington County MRA
- NRHP reference No.: 82003081
- Added to NRHP: April 20, 1982

Isaac Staples' Sawmill is a historic industrial property in Stillwater, Minnesota, United States, consisting of an 1850 stone powerhouse and a 1900 metal-clad factory. The property was listed on the National Register of Historic Places as St. Croix Lumber Mills—Stillwater Manufacturing Company in 1982 for its local significance in the theme of industry. It was nominated because the powerhouse is the only surviving industrial building associated with Isaac Staples (1816–1898), a major figure in Minnesota's early commercial development. The property now operates as a shopping mall with upper level apartments.

== History ==
The powerhouse with its 80-foot (24 m) smokestack was constructed by the partners Sawyer and Heaton in 1850, establishing the second sawmill in Stillwater. Isaac Staples arrived in the booming lumber town in 1853 as the representative of Samuel F. Hersey and other eastern investors. Successfully establishing himself in the lumber milling and mercantile industries, Staples decided to go into business for himself in 1869. He purchased Sawyer and Heaton's mill, which had passed through several owners, overhauling and renaming it the St. Croix Lumber Mills.

Staples operated the mill until the 1880s, when it was sold to J.H. Townsend and Company for use as a flour mill. The Stillwater Manufacturing Company also moved into the complex in 1888. A subsidiary of the Minnesota Thresher Company, they were a manufacturer of doors, window blinds, and window sashes. In 1894 a fire destroyed all the wooden mill structures, leaving only the limestone powerhouse. The Stillwater Manufacturing Company constructed a four-story, metal-sided building adjacent to the powerhouse in 1900.

== See also ==
- National Register of Historic Places listings in Washington County, Minnesota
