= Washington County Historical Society (Minnesota) =

Coordinates: 45.061630°N 92.807858°W

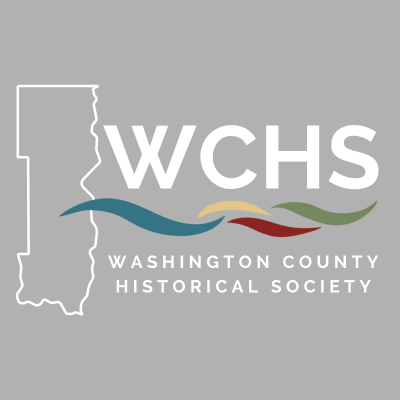

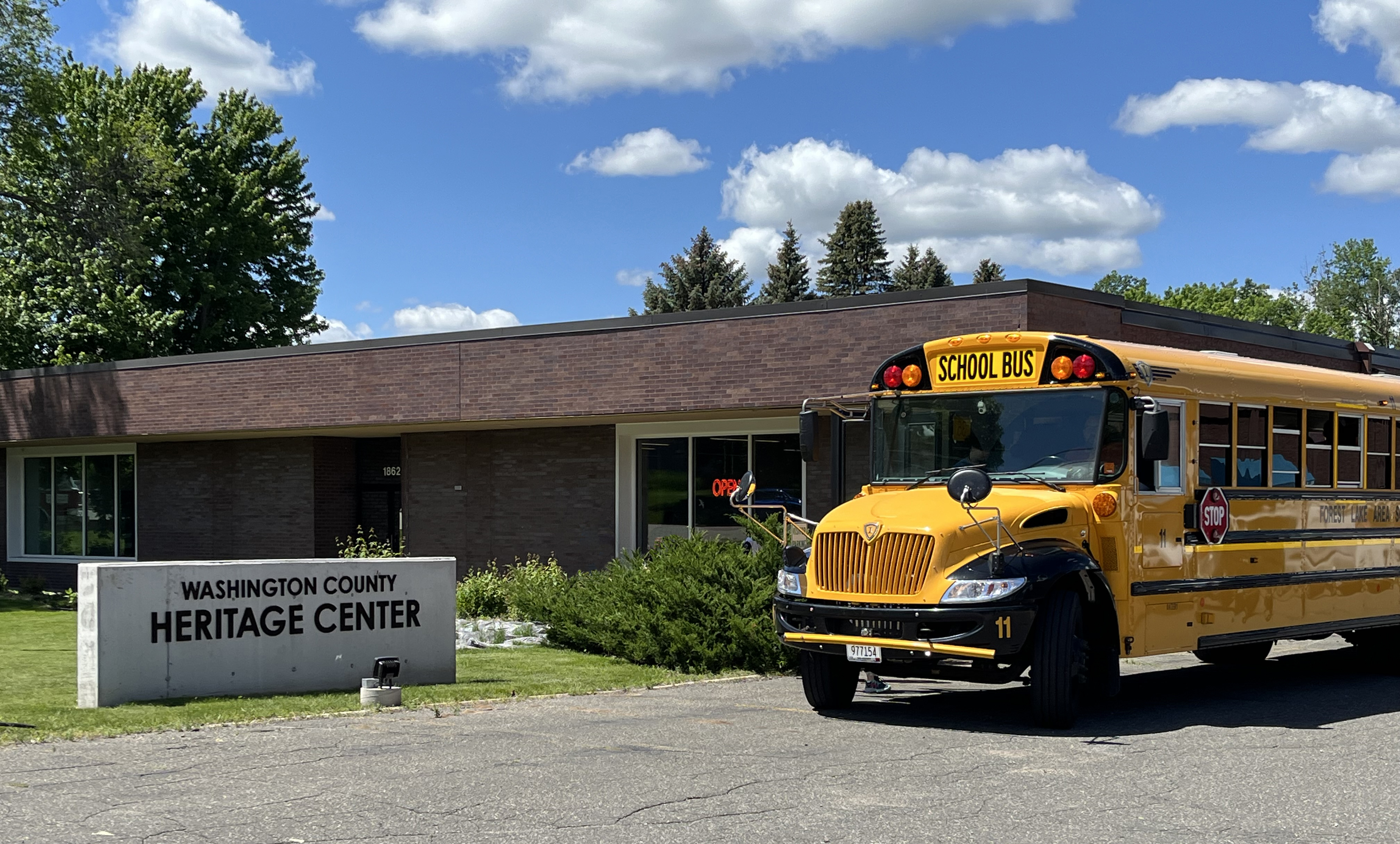
- Exterior of the Washington County Heritage Center with school bus
- Established: 1934
- Location: 1862 S. Greeley Street, Stillwater, Minnesota, USA
- Type: Local history
- Executive director: Brent Peterson
- Website: wchsmn.org

The Washington County Historical Society (WCHS) is a non-profit organization founded in 1934. Its mission is to collect, preserve, and share the history of Washington County, Minnesota.

== History ==
An article in the Stillwater Daily Sun of December 17, 1881, first proposed the idea of a Stillwater Historical Society, emphasizing the importance of establishing it promptly to facilitate its future work. It highlighted the potential contributions of local residents in documenting the settlement of the St. Croix Valley and urged the formation of a historical society, suggesting it could extend beyond Stillwater to encompass Washington County or the St. Croix Valley.

On April 11, 1934, with about 75 people attended a meeting at the Stillwater Public Library to officially established the Washington County Historical Society. The Washington County Historical Society operated from a room at the Stillwater Public Library, collecting county-wide documents, photos, and family histories.

In 1941, the Society purchased the Warden's House Museum in Stillwater from the state, one of the state's oldest buildings and its second oldest continuously operating house museum. The Society also acquired the Hay Lake School in 1974, the Johannes Erickson Log House in the early 1980s. All three buildings are on the National Register of Historic Places. The historic family-owned Boutwell Cemetery was purchased in 1978.

In 1996, the Society undertook the reconstruction of the Carriage House that originally stood behind the Warden's House. By 2001, climate control had been added, allowing for the safe storage of the textile collection and archives in the new facility.

The most recent project involved the opening of the new Washington County Heritage Center in Stillwater, Minnesota. The Heritage Center showcases the history of all towns and areas within Washington County.

== Sites ==
Washington County Historical Society (WCHS) operates several properties in Stillwater, Minnesota, operates two museums outside Stillwater, Minnesota.

=== Washington County Heritage Center ===
A newer addition, the Washington County Heritage Center opened in 2021. Occupying a former U.F.E. Inc. manufacturing building at 1862 S. Greeley Street, the expansive space allows the WCHS to showcase the county's diverse history through interactive exhibits. The Heritage Center explores both the history of Stillwater and the broader story of Washington County and the St. Croix Valley.

While not itself a historic structure, the repurposed building offered the expansive space needed for exhibits and visitor amenities. The transformation involved renovations to create galleries, a research center, an education center, and a retail store within the existing framework. Notably, the new location boasts climate-controlled storage, allowing for proper preservation of the Society's vast collection, including a 28-foot long bateau used for lumber transport in the 19th century.

=== Warden's House Museum ===
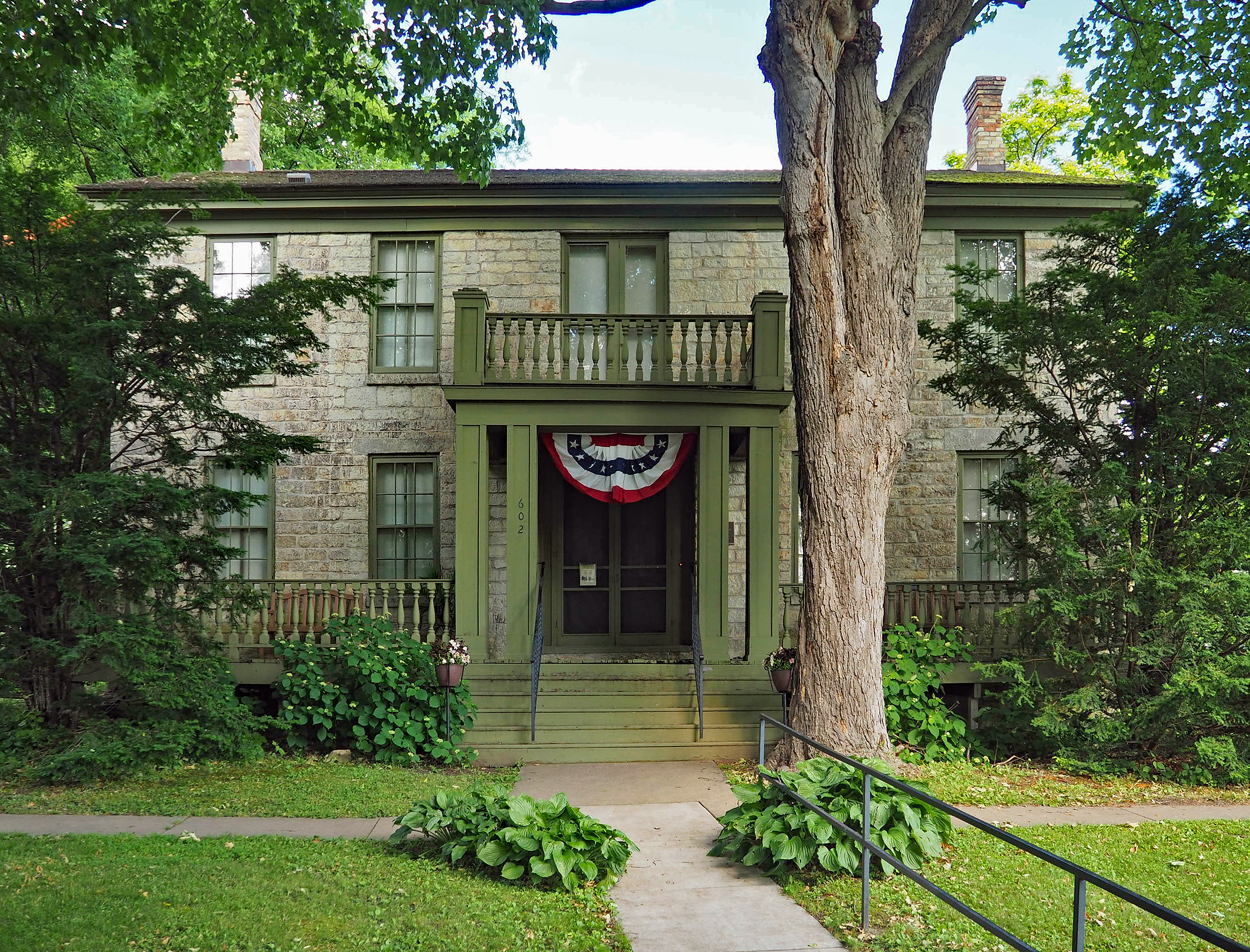
Warden's House Museum

Located at 602 North Main Street, the Warden's House Museum was built in 1853. Originally a residence for wardens overseeing the Minnesota Territorial Prison, it operated until 1914 and was home to 13 wardens and their families. In 1941 it became the second house museum in Minnesota upon acquisition by the WCHS . Visitors can explore the lives of wardens and their families through preserved furnishings and exhibits throughout its14 rooms.

=== Hay Lake School Museum ===
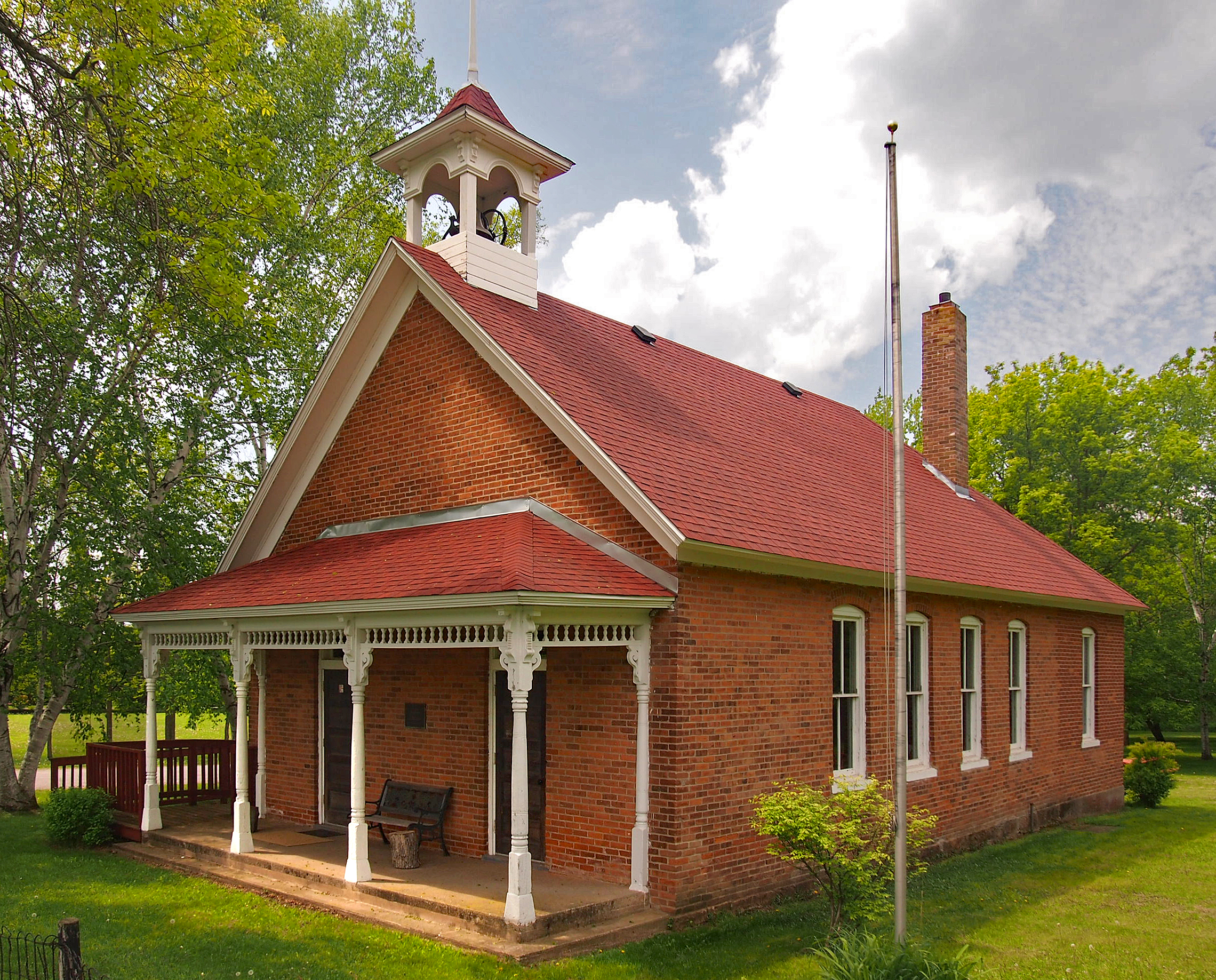
Hay Lake School

Located near Scandia, Minnesota, the Hay Lake School Museum was built in 1872 and served as a one-room schoolhouse for over 80 years. Preserved in its original condition, the schoolhouse offers visitors a chance to experience a typical rural classroom setting from the late 19th and early 20th centuries. Furnishings include student desks, a teacher's desk, and educational materials from the period.

=== Johannes Erickson Log Home ===
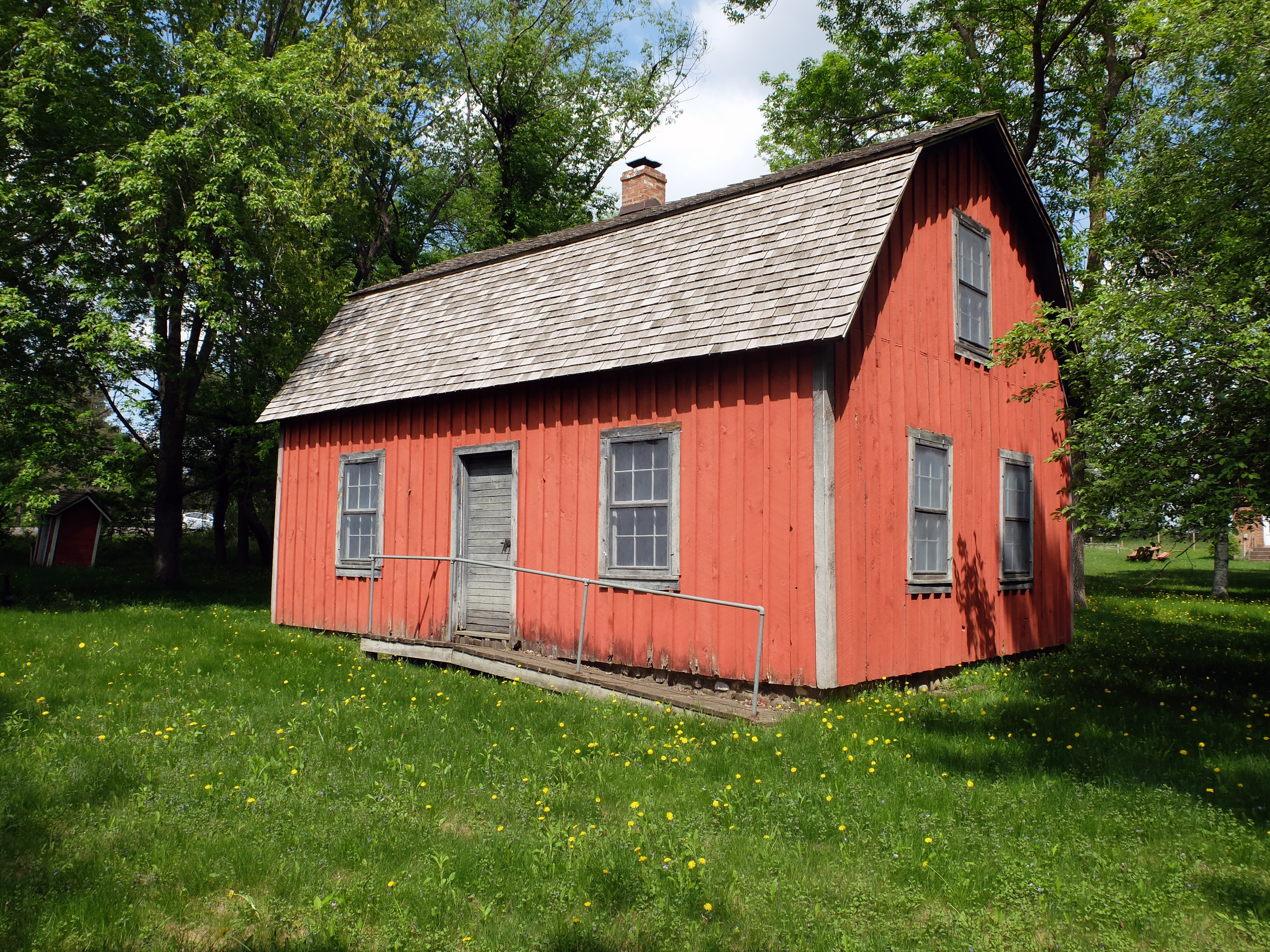
Johannes Erickson Log House

Also located near Scandia, the Johannes Erickson Log Home was built in 1853 by a Swedish immigrant family. The Erickson family lived in the home for over 100 years. The log home is furnished with period pieces reflecting the lifestyle of early Scandinavian settlers in Washington County. Visitors can explore the living quarters, cooking area, and working spaces used by the Erickson family.

== See also ==
- List of museums in Minnesota
