= Senator Hersey =

Senator Hersey may refer to:

- Ira G. Hersey (1858–1943), Maine State Senate
- Samuel F. Hersey (1812–1875), Maine State Senate

== See also ==
- Steve Hershey (born 1964), Maryland State Senate
