= Stillwater station (Minnesota) =

Railway station in Stillwater, Minnesota, United States

Stillwater
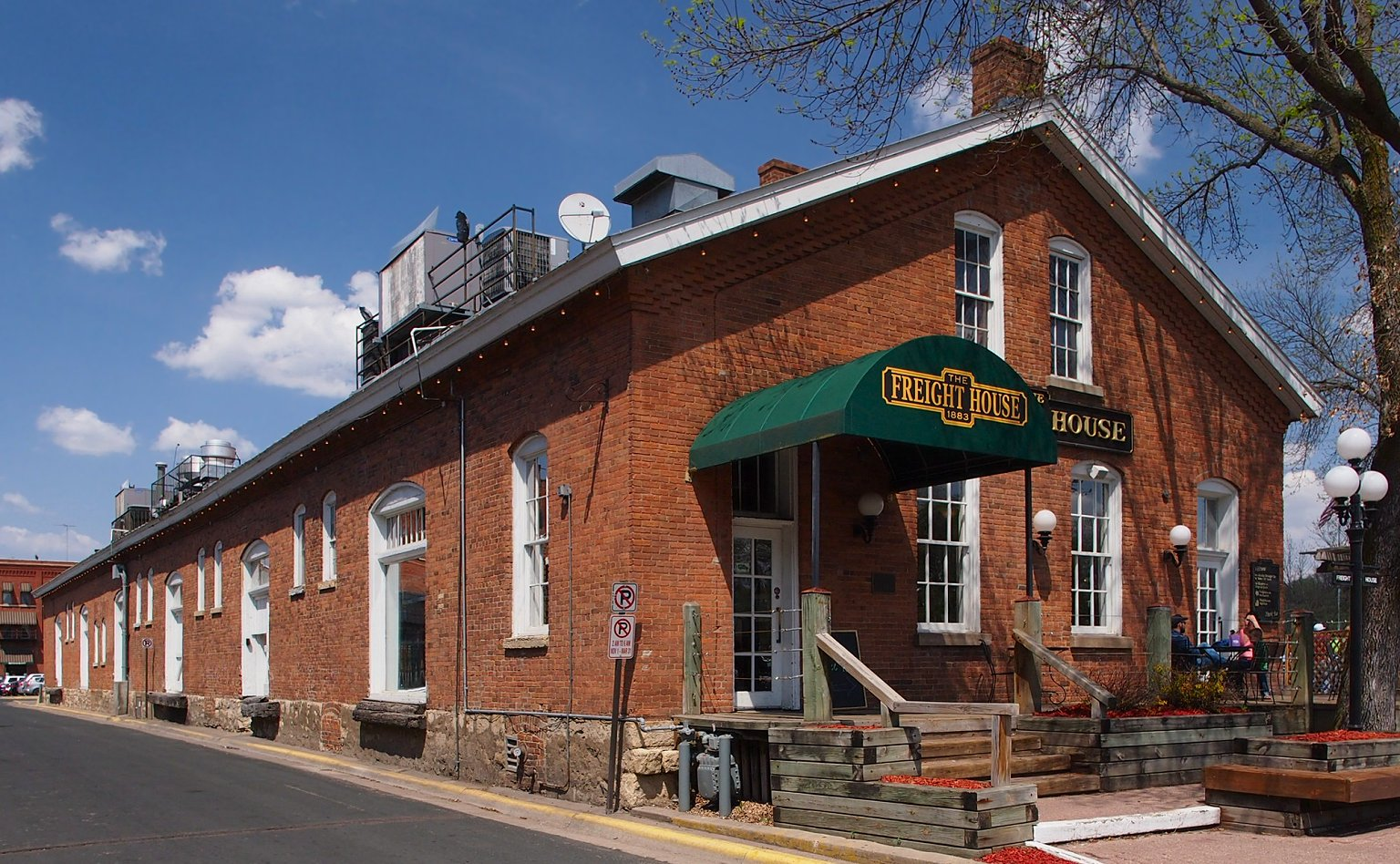
- The Chicago, Milwaukee and St. Paul Freight House from the southwest

General information
- Location: 233–335 Water Street, Stillwater, Minnesota 55082
- System: Former Milwaukee Road passenger rail station

Services
Preceding station	Milwaukee Road	Following station
Terminus	Stillwater – Hastings	Bayport toward Hastings
- Chicago, Milwaukee and St. Paul Freight House
- U.S. National Register of Historic Places
- U.S. Historic district – Contributing property
- Location within Minnesota Location within the United States
- Location: 233–335 Water Street, Stillwater, Minnesota
- Coordinates: 45°3′18.5″N 92°48′16.5″W
- Area: 1 acre (0.40 ha)
- Built: 1883
- Architectural style: Vernacular
- Part of: Stillwater Commercial Historic District (ID92000288)
- MPS: Washington County MRA (AD)
- NRHP reference No.: 77000773

Significant dates
- Added to NRHP: July 13, 1977
- Designated CP: March 26, 1992
Location

The Chicago, Milwaukee and St. Paul Freight House is a historic former railway station in Stillwater, Minnesota, United States It was built in 1883 as a passenger and freight depot for the Chicago, Milwaukee and St. Paul Railway (better known as the Milwaukee Road). It was listed on the National Register of Historic Places in 1977 for its local significance in the themes of commerce, communications, engineering, and transportation. Its notability derives in part from its long service to Stillwater—nearly all goods shipped to and from the city passed through this station, and up to the 1920s it hosted critical telegraph and Railway Express Agency offices. The building is also noted as a somewhat rare example of a combination freight and passenger station, and for the engineering of its internal wood construction. It is also a contributing property to the Stillwater Commercial Historic District. The station closed in 1970 and now houses the Freight House Restaurant.

== History ==
The predecessor of the Milwaukee Road was the Stillwater and Hastings Railway, which was established in 1880 to connect Stillwater to Hastings, Minnesota. The Stillwater and Hastings Railway only completed five miles (8 km) of track before being acquired by the Milwaukee Road in 1882, which completed the construction.

During this period in the 1880s, Stillwater was a busy trade center, handling traffic from miners and trappers from the north of town and from farmers and lumbermen from the west. The Milwaukee Road built the freight house in 1883, and it soon handled more than 70 railcars per day. The construction was very solid, with a limestone foundation two feet (61 cm) thick and 18-inch-thick (46 cm) walls that were 30 feet (9 m) high. It had floorboards that were four inches (10 cm) wide and one inch (2.5 cm) thick. The heavy ceiling trusses supported a full slate roof.

The freight house operated through 1970, when the Milwaukee Road closed it. It was listed on the National Register of Historic Places in 1977, making it the first building in Stillwater so listed. In 1992 much of downtown Stillwater was listed on the National Register as a historic district, with the Freight House as a contributing property.

== See also ==
- National Register of Historic Places listings in Washington County, Minnesota
