= Lois Walfrid Johnson =

American novelist

- Born: November 23, 1936 (age 89)
- Education: Gustavus Adolphus College
- Occupation: Author
- Writing career
- Genre: Children's literature
- Website: lwjbooks.com

Lois Walfrid Johnson (November 23, 1936) is an American children's book author. She writes from a Christian perspective.

== Biography ==
Johnson was born to Alvar Walfrid, a pastor and to Lydia Walfrid, a bookkeeper and business manager. She grew up in Scandia, Minnesota. At age nine, she knew she wanted to become a writer.

Johnson graduated from Gustavus Adolphus College with a bachelor's degree.

Johnson has been writing since the 1970s. Her second picture book, was considered a "silly spin-off of the Nativity" by School Library Journal. In 1998, four books from her Let's-Talk-About-It series won a Gold Medallion Book Award. In her books, she hides inside secrets, things which only she or those close to her would recognize.

Other awards include the C. S. Lewis Medal for Best Series in the year in which it was published, the Wisconsin State Historical Society Award of Merit for Distinguished Service to History, and five Silver Angel Awards from Excellence in Media.

== Awards ==
- Moonbeam Children's Book Awards, 2007 Bronze Medal Winner - Multicultural Fiction, Teen Category, for The Raider's Promise.
- Retailers Choice Award, Youth/Teen category, finalist for Heart of Courage, 2006.
- C. S. Lewis Medal for Notable Books for The Swindler's Treasure, 1997, and Midnight Rescue, 1997.
- Five Silver Angel Awards from Excellence in Media for The Disappearing Stranger, 1991, Trouble at Wild River, 1992, The Runaway Clown, 1994; Disaster on Windy Hill, 1995; Escape into the Night, 1996.
- C. S. Lewis Honor Book, Silver Medal for Escape into the Night, 1996.
- Award of Merit from Excellence in Media for Grandpa's Stolen Treasure, 1993.
- Council for Wisconsin Writers, Arthur Tofte Juvenile Book Award for Trouble at Wild River, 1992.
- Wisconsin State Historical Society Award of Merit for Distinguished Service to History for Adventures of the Northwoods Series, 1991.
- Gold Medallion Book Award for all four books in the Let's-Talk-About-It Stories for Kids Series, 1989.
- C. S. Lewis Medal for Best Series Published in 1988, given to same four books in Let's-Talk-About-It Stories for Kids Series, 1989.
- Distinguished Alumni Citation for Distinguished Service and Significant Attainment in the Field of Christian Literature, Gustavus Adolphus College, 1983.
- Dwight L. Moody Award for Excellence in Christian Literature, Decision Magazine, 1969.

== Books ==
=== Viking Quest Series ===
1. Raiders From the Sea (2003)
2. Mystery of the Silver Coins (2003)
3. The Invisible Friend (2004)
4. Heart of Courage (2005)
5. The Raider's Promise (2006)

Titles 1-4 available in Norwegian, Titles 1-5 available in German

=== Adventures of the Northwoods Series ===
1. The Disappearing Stranger (1990)
2. The Hidden Message (1990)
3. The Creeping Shadows (1990)
4. The Vanishing Footprints (1991)
5. Trouble at Wild River (1991)
6. The Mysterious Hideaway (1992)
7. Grandpa's Stolen Treasure (1992)
8. The Runaway Clown (1994)
9. The Mystery of the Missing Map (1994)
10. Disaster at Windy Hill (1994)

Titles 1-10 available in German. Titles 1-6 available in Swedish.

=== Riverboat Adventures Series ===
1. Escape into the Night (1995)
2. Race for Freedom (1996)
3. Midnight Rescue (1996)
4. The Swindler's Treasure (1997)
5. Mysterious Signal (1998)
6. The Fiddler's Secret (1998)

Titles 1-6 available in German

=== Let's Talk About it Series ===
- Thanks for Being My Friend! (1988, 2000)
- You're Worth More Than You Think (1988, 1999)
- You Are Wonderfully Made! (1988, 1999)
- Secrets of the Best Choice (1988, 1999)
- Feeling Great (1988) (Australia)
- Making Choices (1988) (Australia)

=== Other titles ===
- Just a Minute, Lord (1973)
- Aaron's Christmas Donkey (1974)
- Hello, God!: Prayers for small children (1975)
- You're My Best Friend, Lord (1976)
- Gift in My Arms: Thoughts for New Mothers (for adults) (1977)
- Either Way, I Win: A Guide to Growth in the Power of Prayer(for adults) (1979)
- Either Way, I Win: God's Hope for Difficult Times (for adults) (2000)
- Songs for Silent Moments: Prayers for Daily Living (for adults) (1980)
- Come As You Are: Devotions for Young Teens (1982)
- Falling Apart or Coming Together: How You Can Experience the Faithfulness of God (for adults)(1984)
- Burnt Cookies and other devos for girls on the go (2004)
- Girl Talk: 52 Weekly Devotions (2009) (U. S. and U.K.)
