= Charles Spangenberg Farmstead =

Historic farm in Woodbury, Minnesota, US

- U.S. National Register of Historic Places
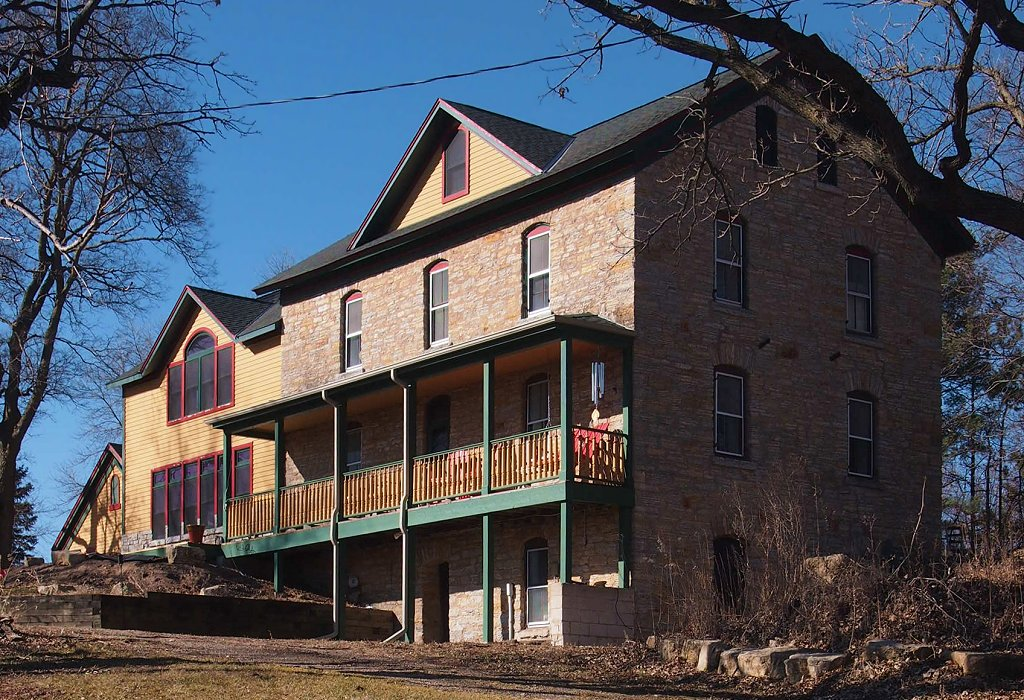
- The Charles Spangenberg Farmhouse from the northeast

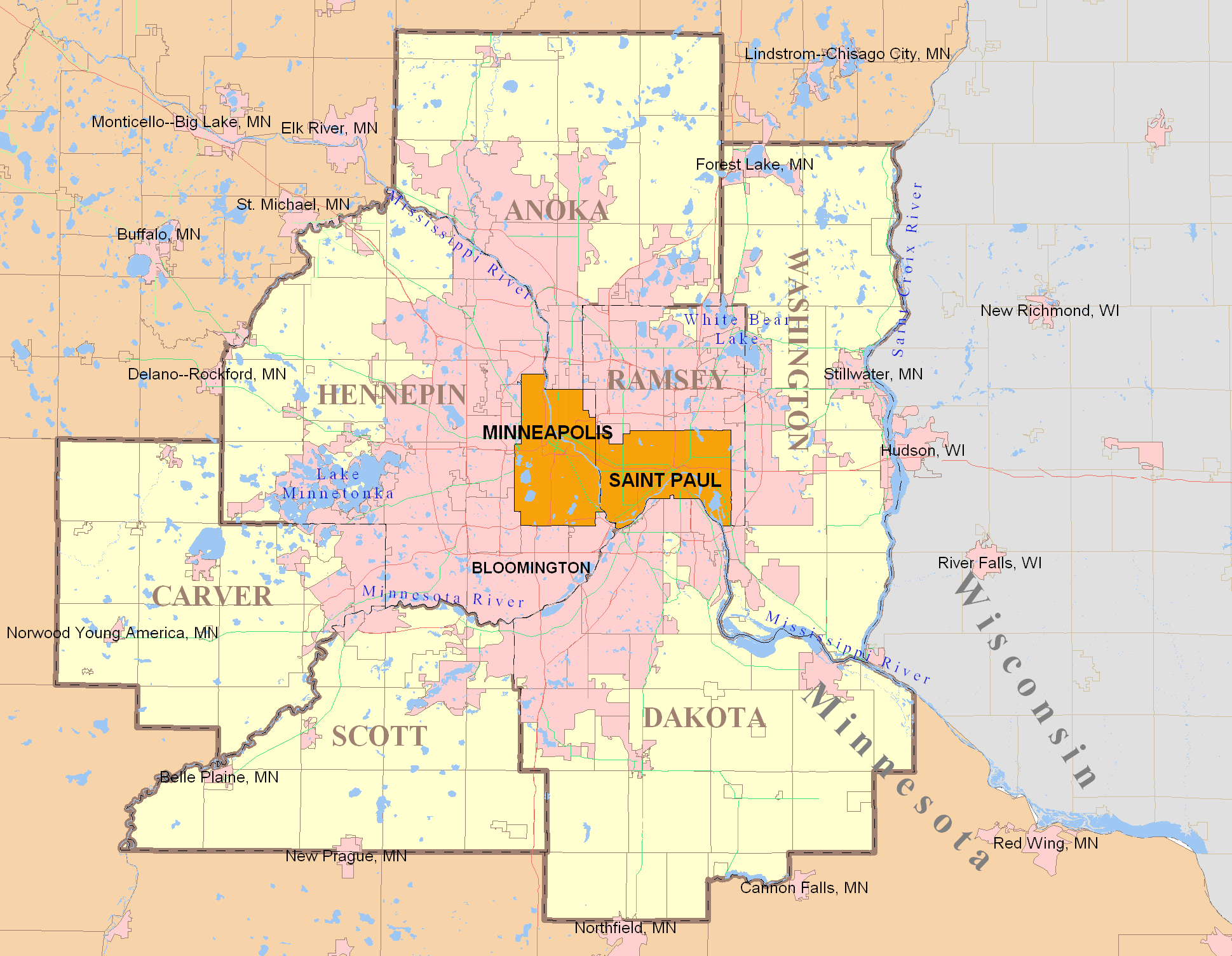
- Location within Minneapolis–Saint Paul Location within Minnesota Location within the United States
- Location: 9431 Dale Road, Woodbury, Minnesota
- Coordinates: 44°52′33″N 92°54′53″W
- Area: 4 acres (1.6 ha)
- Built: 1871–1900
- Architect: Charles and Frederick Spangenberg
- MPS: Washington County MRA (AD)
- NRHP reference No.: 78001570
- Designated NRHP: December 5, 1978

The Charles Spangenberg Farmstead is a historic farm in Woodbury, Minnesota, United States, established in 1869. The three oldest buildings, including an 1871 farmhouse, were listed together on the National Register of Historic Places in 1978 for having local significance in the theme of agriculture. The property was nominated for being one of Washington County's few remaining 19th-century farmsteads.

== Description ==
Charles Spangenberg's farm originally constituted 160 acres (65 ha). The farm buildings are clustered together on a 4-acre (1.6 ha) lot on top of a knoll. Only the three oldest buildings date to Spangenberg's occupancy: the farmhouse, a barn, and a granary. The house was constructed of limestone in 1871. It has three stories plus a walkout basement, having been built into a slope. At their base the walls are 24 inches (61 cm) thick and taper to 18 inches (46 cm). In recent years the house has been expanded with a new wing, a garage, and dormers for additional headroom in the attic.

The two-story granary was constructed around 1875. A larger barn for the Spangenbergs' horses and dairy cattle was built around 1887. Both are timber-framed structures with board-and-batten siding, on limestone foundations. The barn was also built into a slope, providing walk-in access both to the level for livestock and the level for hay storage.

Additional farm structures were constructed in the first half of the 20th century, including a chicken coop, ice house, wind-powered water pump, milk house, privy, and smoke house. As of 2015 a pump house built around 1925 and a steel silo constructed in 1940 still stood on the property.

== History ==
Charles Spangenberg was an early pioneer of the Woodbury area and acquired title to 160 acres (65 ha) in 1869. With his brother Frederick (Note: Sources do not clarify whether this is the same individual associated with the Frederick Spangenberg House in Saint Paul, Minnesota.) he began building a house, quarrying limestone from bluffs overlooking the Mississippi River and hauling it with a team of horses and a stone-boat. Charles and his family lived in the house's foundation until construction was complete in 1871.

The Spangenbergs mostly grew potatoes and grain, the usual produce of the area's farms. The property remained in the family until 1901, when it was sold to the Czikalla family. They built a number of additional structures and shifted primarily to dairy farming.

The property stayed in the Czikalla family for over a century, changing hands for only the third time when it was put up for auction in 2008. The new owners have been gradually restoring the historic wing of the house, as well as expanding the Czikallas' more recent additions.

== See also ==
- National Register of Historic Places listings in Washington County, Minnesota
