= Mortimer Webster House =

Historic house in Minnesota, United States

- U.S. National Register of Historic Places
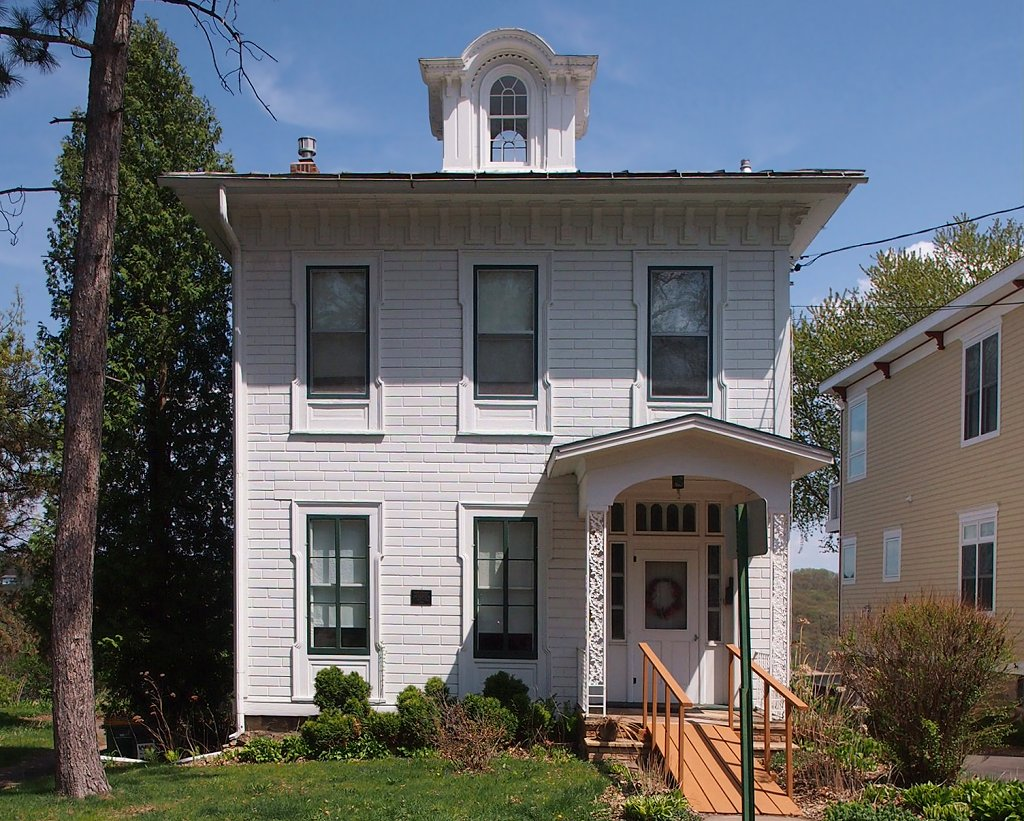
- The Mortimer Webster House from the south-southwest

- Location within Minnesota Location within the United States
- Location: 435 South Broadway Street, Stillwater, Minnesota
- Coordinates: 45°3′11″N 92°48′15.5″W
- Area: Less than one acre
- Built: 1865–66
- Architectural style: Italianate
- MPS: Washington County MRA
- NRHP reference No.: 82003083
- Added to NRHP: April 20, 1982

The Mortimer Webster House is a historic house in Stillwater, Minnesota, United States, constructed 1865–1866. It is listed on the National Register of Historic Places in 1982 for having local significance in the themes of architecture and commerce. It was nominated for being one of the best examples of Italianate architecture in Stillwater, and for its association with Mortimer Webster, one of the town's notable early entrepreneurs.

== Description ==
The Mortimer Webster house is a two-story, wood-frame house originally built as a cube with a rooftop cupola. Initially there were porches extending across the front and rear façades. A one-story wing was added to the rear around 1900.

== History ==
Mortimer Webster was born in Owego, New York, in 1836. He worked as a house painter in the region before heading west in his late teens. Following stops in Hudson and New Richmond, Wisconsin, he and his brother William arrived in Stillwater in the summer of 1856 and established a painting business. In 1860 Webster transferred his livelihood to livery services and real estate. By 1866 he was concentrating exclusively on real estate, and had prospered enough to commission this fine house on a bluff overlooking the town. By the end of the decade he had platted two additions to Stillwater and by 1881 had significant interests in lots in the area as well as in Fargo, Dakota Territory.

== Gallery ==
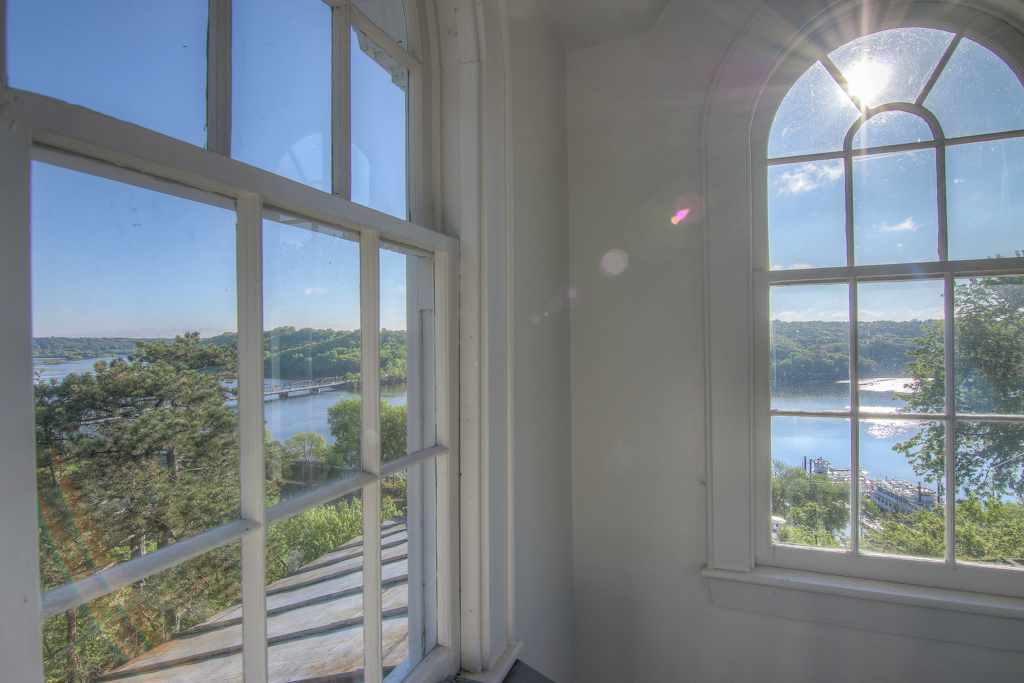
View from the Mortimer Webster House's cupola

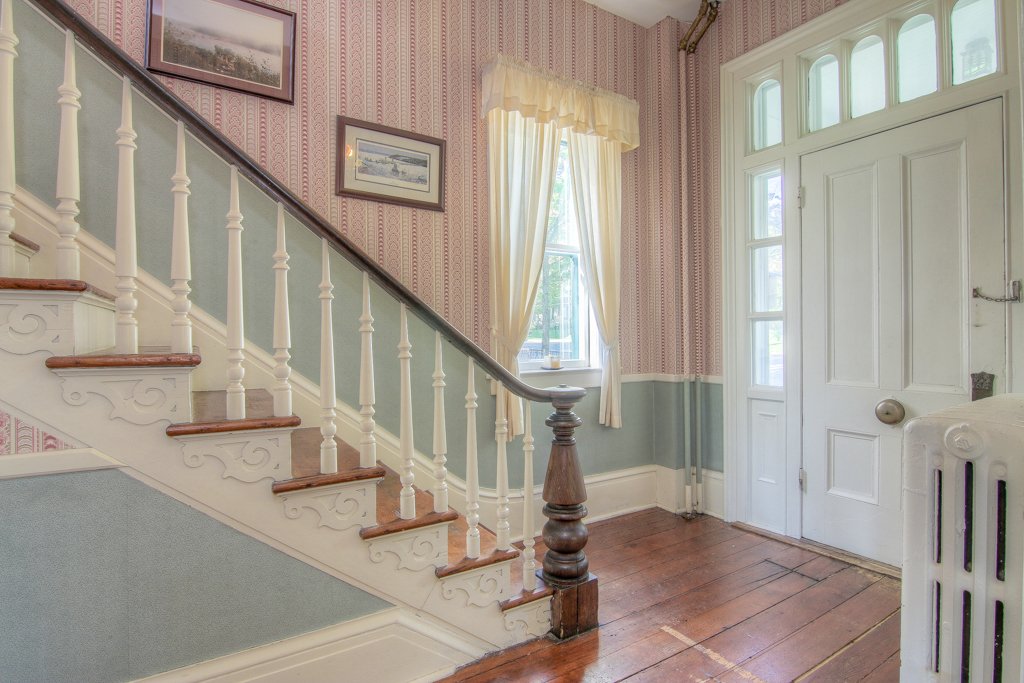
Staircase

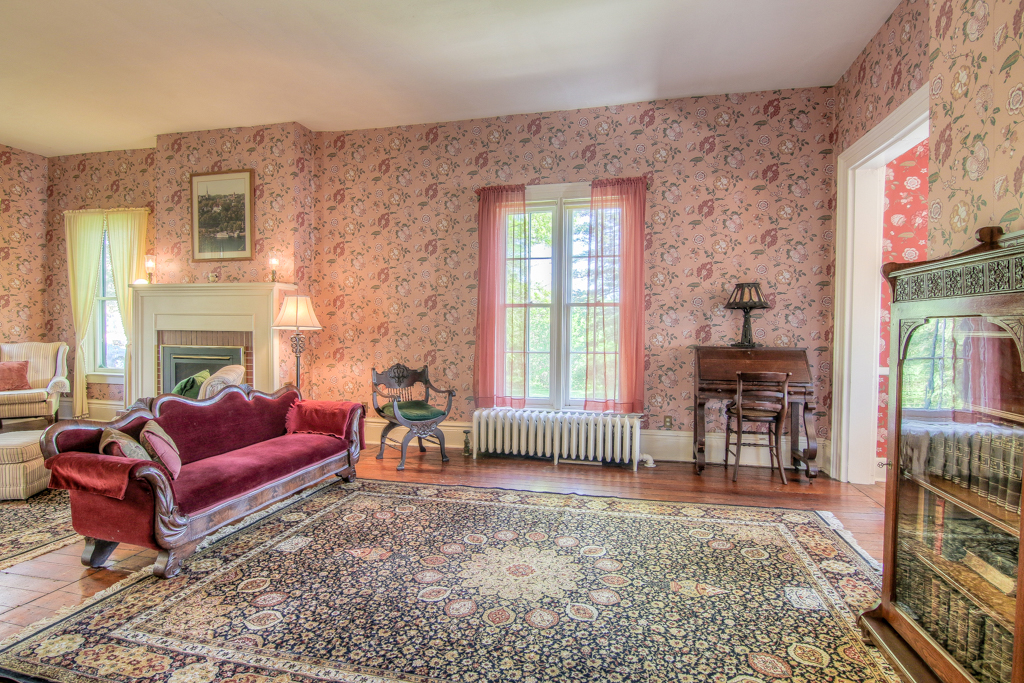
Living room

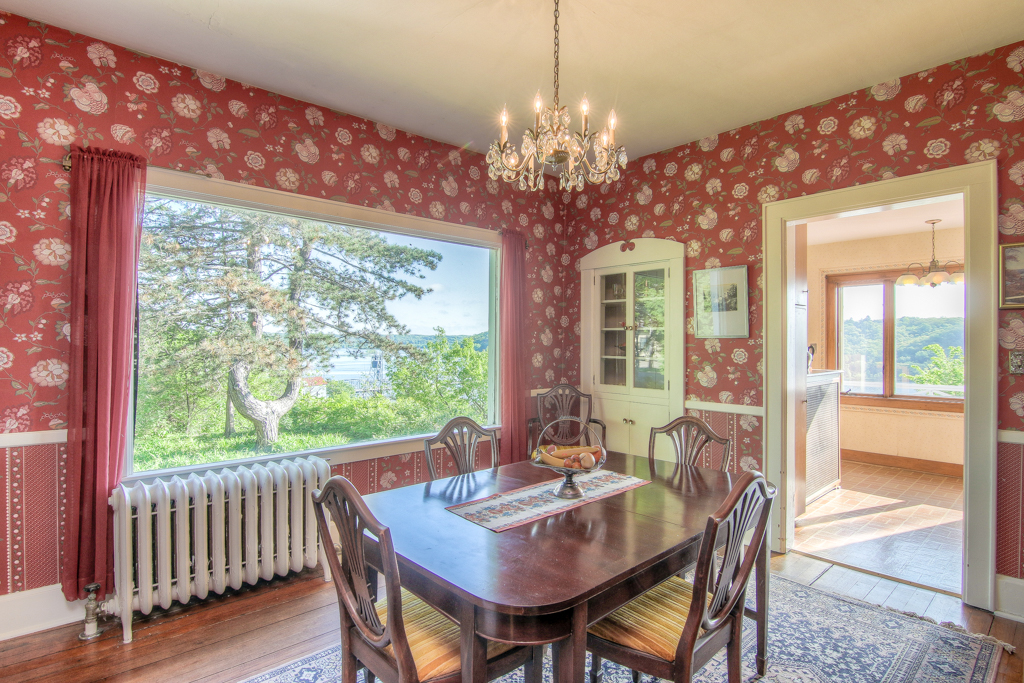
Dining room (added in the early 20th century)

== See also ==
- National Register of Historic Places listings in Washington County, Minnesota
