= Johannes Erickson House =

Historic house in Minnesota, United States

- U.S. National Register of Historic Places
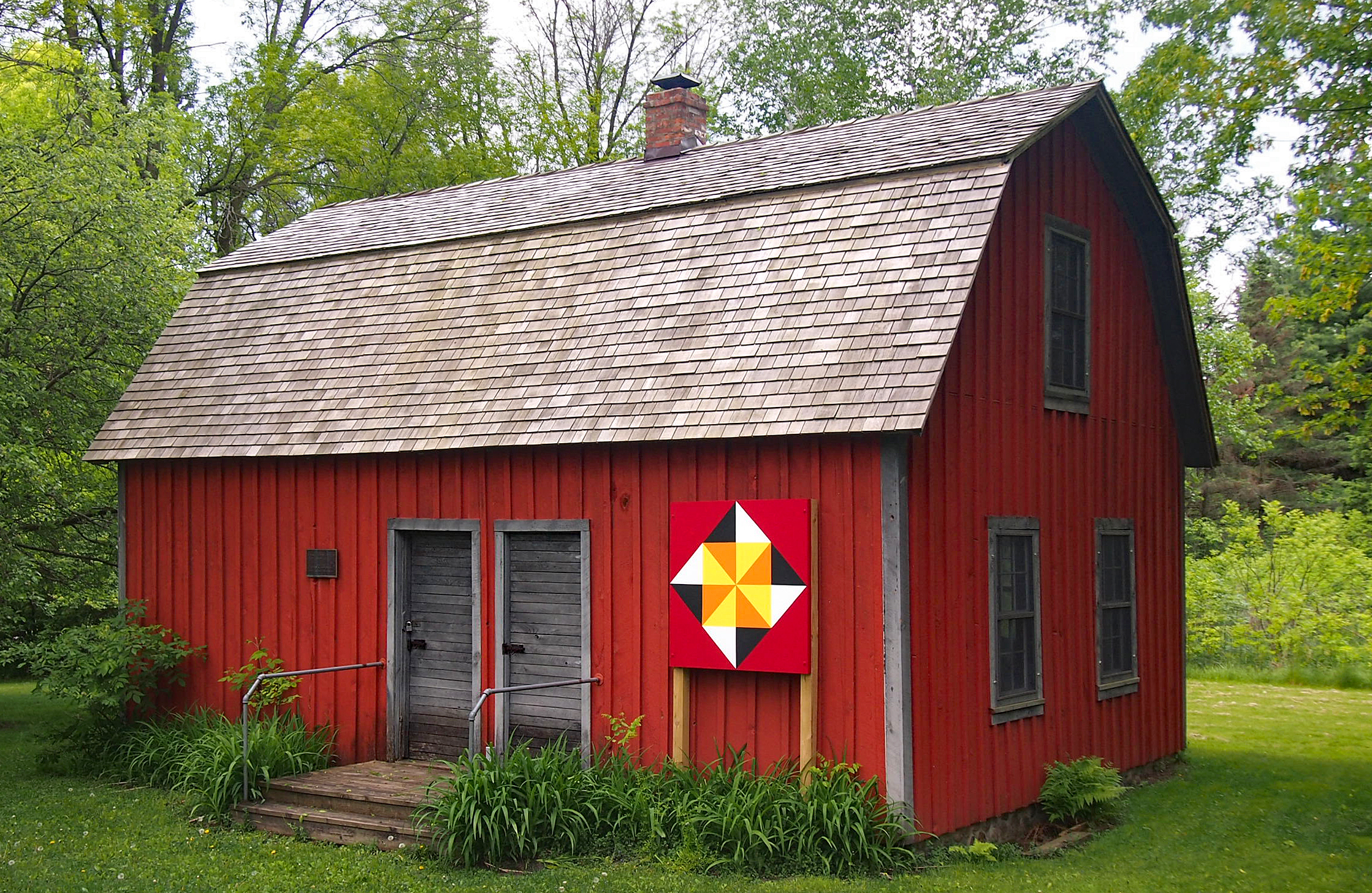
- The Johannes Erickson House from the northeast

- Location within Minnesota Location within the United States
- Location: 14020 195th Street, Scandia, Minnesota
- Coordinates: 45°13′54.2″N 92°49′15.5″W
- Area: Approximately 1 acre (0.40 ha)
- Built: 1868
- Architect: Johannes Erickson
- Architectural style: Log-gambrel
- MPS: Washington County MRA (AD)
- NRHP reference No.: 76001078
- Designated: June 17, 1976

The Johannes Erickson House is a historic log cabin in Scandia, Minnesota, United States. It was built in 1868 with a gambrel roof, a distinctive tradition from southern Sweden. It was moved to its current site adjacent to the Hay Lake School in 1974 to be part of a small museum complex operated by the Washington County Historical Society. The Erickson House was listed on the National Register of Historic Places in 1976 for its local significance in the themes of architecture and exploration/settlement. It was nominated as a rare surviving example of a style brought to Minnesota by Swedish immigrants from Dalsland and Småland.

== Description ==
The Johannes Erickson House is a small, two-story house measuring 28 by 20 feet (8.5 by 6.1 m). The walls are of hewn oak logs, covered over with plank siding. There are two rooms on each floor. The gambrel roof allows for a full-height upper story instead of the cramped loft space of most log cabins.

Access to the upper floor was originally gained by an exterior staircase. In its early days the house also had a lean-to at the rear for use as a summer kitchen.

== History ==
The house was built in 1868 by Johannes Erickson and his 13-year-old son Alfred. In 1904 the adult Alfred Erickson built a new home for the family, and the original cabin saw use over the years as a granary, a garage, and even a playhouse. By 1974 it was no longer useful to owner Vernon Jellum, and he made plans to have it demolished or relocated. The Washington County Historical Society purchased the building and had it moved 1.5 miles (2.4 km) to its current site to form a small museum complex near a 1900 monument to the first Swedish settlers in Minnesota.

== See also ==
- List of museums in Minnesota
- National Register of Historic Places listings in Washington County, Minnesota
