= William Sauntry House and Recreation Hall =

Historic house in Minnesota, United States

- U.S. National Register of Historic Places
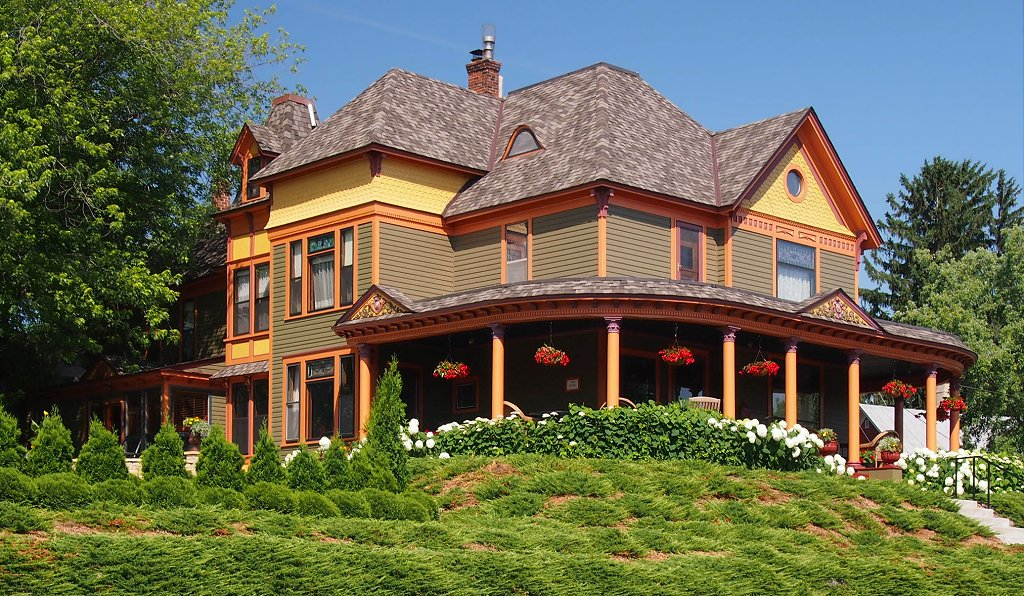
- The William Sauntry House from the southeast

- Location within Minnesota Location within the United States
- Interactive map showing the location of William Sauntry House and Recreation Hall
- Location: 626 4th Street and 625 5th Street North, Stillwater, Minnesota
- Coordinates: 45°3′40″N 92°48′47″W
- Area: Less than one acre
- Built: 1881–83, 1902
- Architectural style: Queen Anne/Moorish Revival
- MPS: Washington County MRA
- NRHP reference No.: 82003080
- Added to NRHP: April 20, 1982

The William Sauntry House and Recreation Hall is a historic property in Stillwater, Minnesota, United States, consisting of a late-nineteenth-century house and a 1902 addition styled after a Moorish palace. It was listed on the National Register of Historic Places in 1982 for its local significance in the themes of architecture and industry. It was nominated for its association with prosperous local lumberman William Sauntry (1845–1914) and for its fanciful recreation hall, one of Minnesota's best examples of a folly and a rare use of Moorish Revival architecture. Now in separate ownership, the recreation hall has been restored as a private home while the William Sauntry Mansion operates as an office of RE/MAX Professionals.

== Description ==
The generally rectangular form of the mansion is complicated with gables and hip roofed bays. It is generally Queen Anne in style, but has Eastlake movement millwork, an Italianate tower, and Gothic Revival details on the gables. The lower levels have horizontal siding while the attic level boasts fishscale shingling. A large porch with Corinthian order columns wraps around the front of the building.

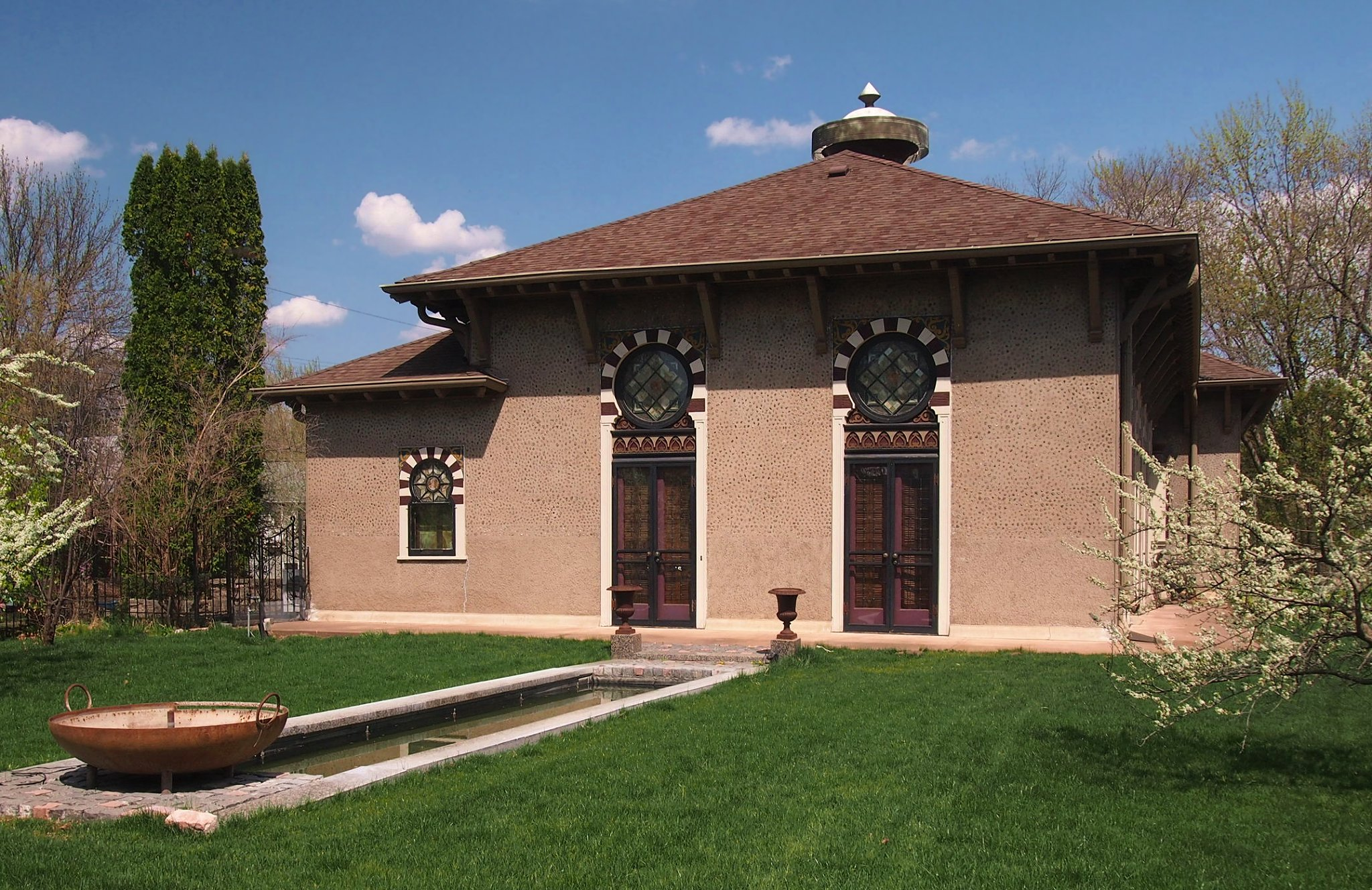
The recreation hall from the southwest

Aligned directly behind the mansion is the recreation hall. This rectangular addition was originally attached to the main building by an enclosed second-level walkway. The exterior is stucco with inlaid stones. The roof is hipped with wide eaves supported by triangular brackets. An entrance from the side street is topped by a gabled dormer featuring a Palladian window with Moorish details. The recreation hall once housed a ballroom, reception hall, bowling alley, and swimming pool. The interior was richly carved and decorated with carved woodwork, double doors of leaded glass, and Arabic inscriptions.

== History ==
William Sauntry was born in poverty around 1845 in County Cork, Ireland. When Sauntry's father died a few years later, his mother moved the surviving family of seven to New Brunswick, Canada. Sauntry began working as a lumberjack, and in the late 1860s he and several family members moved again to Stillwater, Minnesota, epicenter of the Upper Midwest lumber trade. Within five years, the hardworking and ambitious Sauntry was partner in a lumber company. Soon he was part-owner of the St. Croix Log Boom and managing the local interests of Minnesota's leading lumber magnate Frederick Weyerhaeuser.

Sauntry married Eunice Tozer, the daughter of a business partner, in 1881—around the same time he commissioned a house in Stillwater's North Hill neighborhood. Initially a modest 40 by 22 feet (12.2 by 6.7 m), the house grew along with Sauntry's fortune. By this time Sauntry was estimated to be worth $2 million, and a series of architectural modifications added rooms, towers, porches, and upper stories to the house until it comprised 28 rooms and 7,000 square feet (650 m^{2}).

By 1889 Sauntry had added a billiard room and an outdoor tennis court. However his passion for physical activity and entertaining guests led him to commission a freestanding recreation hall behind the main house in 1902. Moreover, his fanciful nature decreed that the hall would be patterned after a Moorish palace (the well-traveled Sauntry had reportedly been inspired by the Alhambra during a trip to Spain). Both Moorish Revival architecture and dedicated recreation halls had some precedence at the time, but were quite rare in Minnesota. Architect Benjamin Marshall of Chicago designed the hall.

By the early 20th century, however, the forests of the Upper Midwest were logged out, the St. Croix Log Boom went out of business, and Sauntry's attempts to invest in mining were not turning a profit. On November 10, 1914, the 69-year-old lumberman left his Blair Flats apartment in Saint Paul and checked into a downtown hotel, where he shot himself in the head. Although Sauntry's fortunes were in some decline, his wife and other close associates were mystified by his abrupt suicide.

Following Sauntry's death, the house and recreation hall were divided into separate properties. In 1920 the recreation hall was converted into a three-unit apartment by its new owner, who had the pool and bowling alley removed and the ceilings lowered. In 1999 new owners began restoring the hall while making it functional as a single-family home. Over the course of a decade they restored the ballroom and foyer to their original decor, complemented with appropriately exotic furniture. The main house was also purchased by new owners in 1999, who made their own restorations and opened the property as a bed and breakfast.

== See also ==
- National Register of Historic Places listings in Washington County, Minnesota
