= John P. Furber House =

Historic house in Minnesota, United States

- U.S. National Register of Historic Places
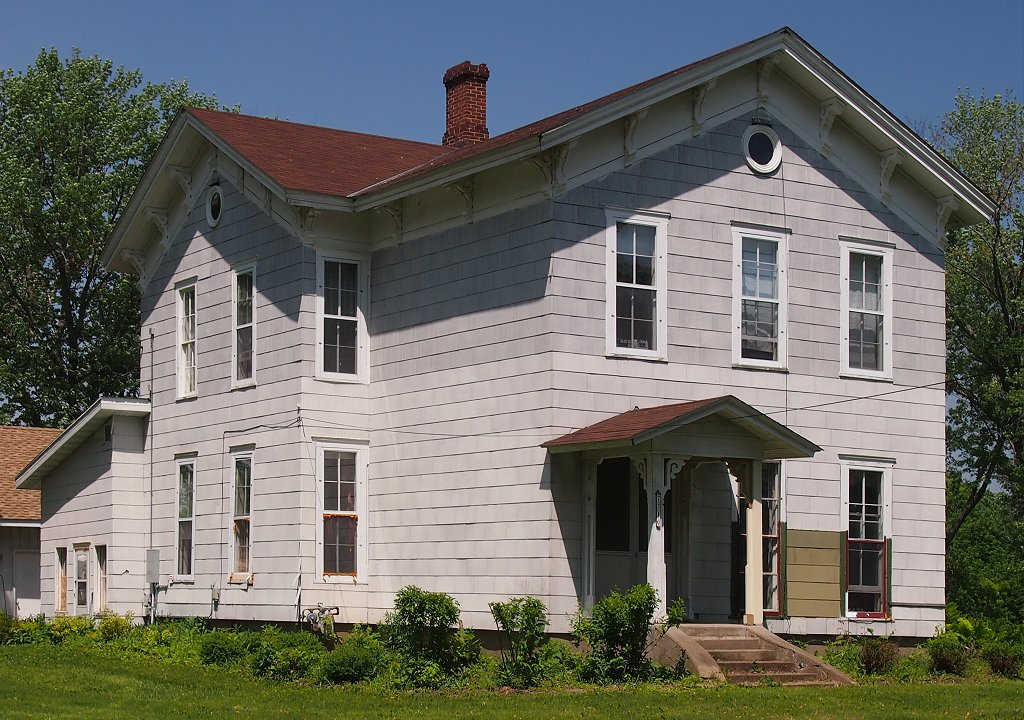
- The John P. Furber House from the southeast

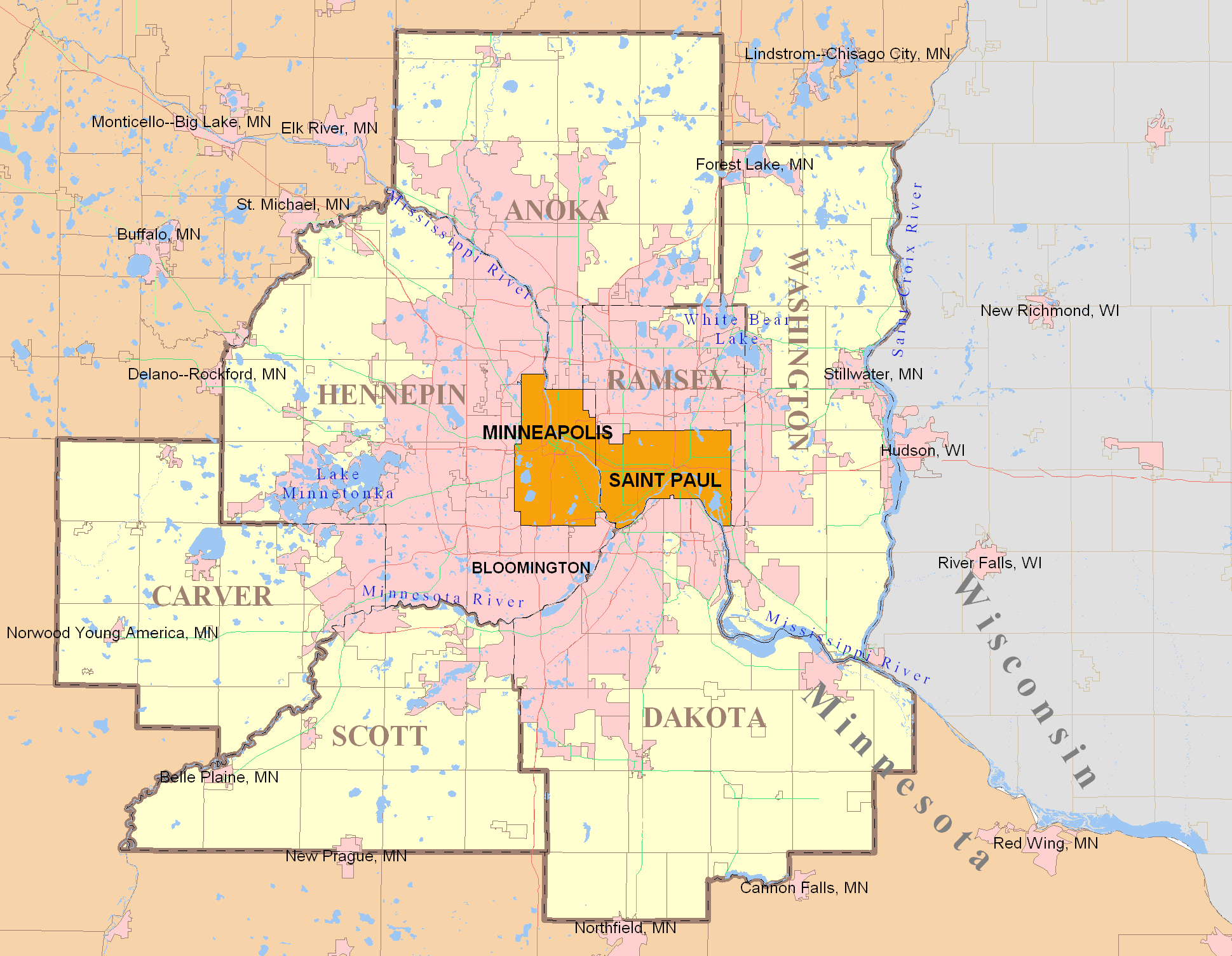
- Location within Minneapolis–Saint Paul Location within Minnesota Location within the United States
- Location: 7310 Lamar Avenue, Cottage Grove, Minnesota
- Coordinates: 44°50′36″N 92°52′55″W
- Area: Less than one acre
- Built: 1871
- Architect: Theodore Furber
- Architectural style: Italianate
- MPS: Washington County MRA
- NRHP reference No.: 82003074
- Designated: April 20, 1982

The John P. Furber House is a historic house in Cottage Grove, Minnesota, United States, built in 1871, the same year Furber officially platted the 20-year-old settlement. It was listed on the National Register of Historic Places in 1982 for having local significance in the theme of community planning and development. It was nominated for its association with the phenomenon in early Washington County towns of platting well after communities had already been established.

== Description ==
The John P. Furber House is a two-story wood frame building. It is gabled on the front façade and on the two side bays, with round windows at the peaks. Elements of Italianate architecture are found in the low-pitched roof, wide eaves supported by scrolled brackets, and tall narrow windows.

The house originally had a full-width porch across the front façade. A lean-to was added to the rear sometime before 1940, replacing a small back porch.

== History ==
John P. Furber and his four brothers originally hailed from New Hampshire, but between 1844 and 1860 they moved one-by-one to the Cottage Grove area, one of the first Euro-American farming regions in the future state of Minnesota. One of Washington County's first inland settlements emerged there as an informal village by 1851. The Furber brothers were notable early settlers, and John (or J.P.) was the village shopkeeper. In 1871 he conducted a survey of the townsite, formally platting the already-established community. This phenomenon of post-settlement platting also occurred in several other Washington County towns, such as Stillwater, Afton, and Point Douglas.

Some sources say Furber's house dates to the 1850s, making it the oldest standing building in the historic core of Cottage Grove. Official National Register documentation gives a construction date of 1871, the same year as Furber's survey.

The house remained in the Furber family for decades, only changing hands in 1940 with its acquisition by Jacob and Arlene Vandenberg. In 1947 Jacob Vandenberg built on the property a 130-foot-long (40 m) dairy barn with an arched Gothic Revival roof. The estate stayed in the Vandenberg family for 70 years, only passing to all-new owners in 2010. Now billed as the Historic John P. Furber Farm, the third family to own the property has renovated the barn to serve as a wedding venue; However, they are expected to declare bankruptcy as seen in their other venue (Circle B).

== See also ==
- National Register of Historic Places listings in Washington County, Minnesota
