= Schilling Archeological District =

Archaeological site in Minnesota, US

- U.S. National Register of Historic Places
- U.S. Historic district
- Location: Address restricted, Cottage Grove, Minnesota
- Built: 1000 BCE–1700 CE
- MPS: Washington County MRA (AD)
- NRHP reference No.: 78001569
- Designated HD: December 22, 1978

The Schilling Archeological District (Smithsonian trinomial 21WA1) is a prehistoric Native American archaeological site on private property on Lower Grey Cloud Island in Cottage Grove, Minnesota, United States. It consists of a habitation site and mound group with artifacts that date from the Early Woodland Period to the Late Prehistoric Period (1000 BCE–1700 CE). It was listed on the National Register of Historic Places in 1978 for having state-level significance in the theme of archaeology. It was nominated for its rare Early Woodland component, Middle Mississippian cultural influences, and potential to show climatic adaptations over time.

== Archaeological history ==
The site was first surveyed in 1887. At that time 31 conical mounds were recorded, plus traces of four others already obliterated by Euro-American land use. 300 yards (270 m) to the west an additional three conical mounds and a linear embankment were recorded in 1887 but had also been obliterated by 1911. In 1947 a researcher excavated a trench through one of the mounds but found nothing. He also noted a ring of rocks that may have marked a dwelling, but that too disappeared in ensuing years.

In 1955 researchers from the Science Museum of Minnesota conducted a surface survey. They collected 17 potsherds and seven stone tools (four knives or scrapers, two hammerstones, and a celt). This prompted the museum to return in 1958 for what remains the site's most extensive excavation. They determined that the majority of the site's artifacts dated from the Middle Woodland Period, with rare finds indicating earlier and later occupation as well. This helped establish the probable cultural sequence of the site.

Additional excavation took place in 1971. A trench near the center of the mound group yielded a chert blade, three potsherds, and some fire-cracked rocks. Surface collection south of the mounds found additional sherds and 19 lithic flakes.

== Artifacts ==
All the recovered ceramics were tempered with grit rather than shell. The Early Woodland sherds are similar to pottery found elsewhere within the Upper Mississippi and Ohio River drainage basins. The Middle Woodland pieces are comparable to finds at riverine sites in Southeast Minnesota. The Late Woodland and Mississippian ceramics correlate to the cultural complexes of the Upper and Middle Mississippi River.

In addition to the ceramic and lithic finds, fire hearths and refuse pits have also been documented.

== See also ==
- National Register of Historic Places listings in Washington County, Minnesota
