= Cottage Grove, Minnesota =

City in Minnesota, United States

Cottage Grove
- City
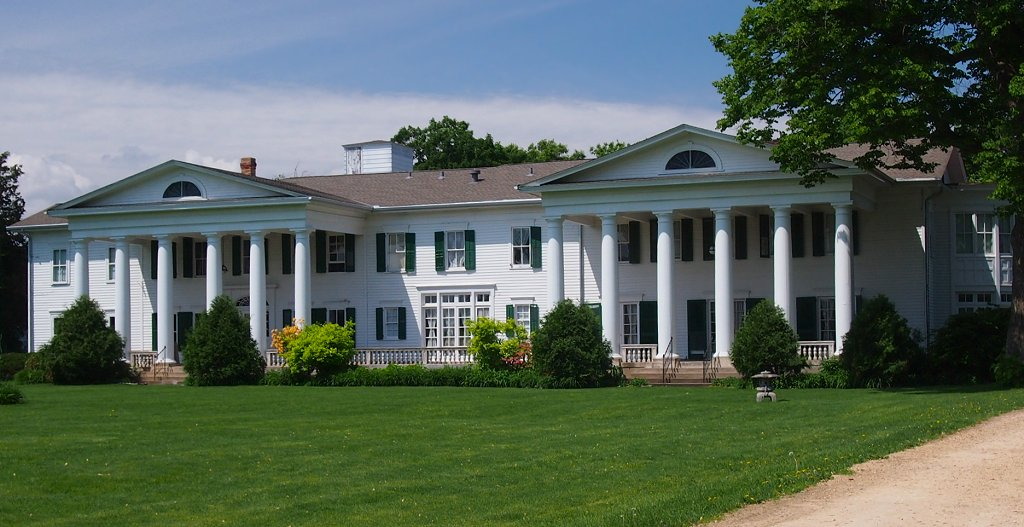
- The Cordenio Severance House

- Wordmark
- Nickname: The "Original" Grove
- Motto: "Where Pride And Prosperity Meet"
- Location of the city of Cottage Grove within Washington County, Minnesota
- Coordinates: 44°48′50″N 92°55′38″W
- Country: United States
- State: Minnesota
- County: Washington
- Founded: 1843

Government
  - Type: Mayor-Council
  - Mayor: Myron Bailey

Area
  - City: 37.53 sq mi (97.19 km^{2})
  - Land: 33.64 sq mi (87.13 km^{2})
  - Water: 3.88 sq mi (10.06 km^{2}) 10.30%
- Elevation: 810 ft (250 m)

Population (2020)
  - City: 38,839
  - Estimate (2025): 43,604
  - Density: 1,154.5/sq mi (445.77/km^{2})
  - Metro: 3,693,729 (US: 16th)
- Time zone: UTC−6 (Central)
  - Summer (DST): UTC−5 (CDT)
- ZIP code: 55016
- Area code: 651
- FIPS code: 27-13456
- GNIS feature ID: 2393644
- Website: cottagegrovemn.gov

Cottage Grove is a city 10 miles (16 km) south of Saint Paul in Washington County in the U.S. state of Minnesota. It lies on the north bank of the Mississippi River, north of the confluence with the St. Croix River. Cottage Grove and nearby suburbs form the southeast portion of Minneapolis-Saint Paul, the 16th-largest metropolitan area in the United States, with about 3.69 million residents. Its population was 38,839 at the 2020 census.

The city is linked by U.S. Highways 10 and 61 and has a comfortable commute to both downtowns and the I-494 Strip in Bloomington. Once a rural township known for the state's first creameries and wheat production, the area was served by rail lines, river shipping, and grist mills. 3M has operated a production facility in Cottage Grove since 1947.

== History ==
Cottage Grove was platted in 1871. The Precolumbian Schilling Archeological District, 1850 Grey Cloud Lime Kiln, 1871 John P. Furber House, and 1917 Cordenio Severance House are listed on the National Register of Historic Places.

== Geography ==
Cottage Grove is 11 miles southeast of St. Paul. It is accessed by U.S. Highway 61 and Interstate 494.

According to the United States Census Bureau, the city has an area of 37.48 square miles (97.07 km^{2}); 33.62 square miles (87.08 km^{2}) is land and 3.86 square miles (10.00 km^{2}) is water.

The city has more land adjacent to the Mississippi River than any other city in Minnesota. It is bordered by Woodbury to the north, Hastings to the south, St. Paul Park to the west, Newport to the northwest, and Denmark Township to the east. The city is approximately half an hour at posted speeds from the Minneapolis-St. Paul International Airport. Southeastern Cottage Grove is five miles from the Wisconsin border.

== Demographics ==
Historical population
Census	Pop.	Note	%±
1970	13,419		—
1980	18,994		41.5%
1990	22,935		20.7%
2000	30,582		33.3%
2010	34,589		13.1%
2020	38,839		12.3%
2025 (est.)	43,604		12.3%
U.S. Decennial Census; 2020 Census

=== 2020 census ===
As of the 2020 census, Cottage Grove had a population of 38,839. The median age was 37.0 years. 27.3% of residents were under the age of 18 and 13.0% of residents were 65 years of age or older. For every 100 females there were 97.8 males, and for every 100 females age 18 and over there were 95.8 males age 18 and over.

95.7% of residents lived in urban areas, while 4.3% lived in rural areas.

There were 13,105 households in Cottage Grove, of which 40.2% had children under the age of 18 living in them. Of all households, 63.4% were married-couple households, 11.6% were households with a male householder and no spouse or partner present, and 18.5% were households with a female householder and no spouse or partner present. About 16.7% of all households were made up of individuals and 8.4% had someone living alone who was 65 years of age or older.

There were 13,445 housing units, of which 2.5% were vacant. The homeowner vacancy rate was 1.0% and the rental vacancy rate was 3.3%.

Racial composition as of the 2020 census
Race	Number	Percent
White	29,623	76.3%
Black or African American	2,370	6.1%
American Indian and Alaska Native	177	0.5%
Asian	2,769	7.1%
Native Hawaiian and Other Pacific Islander	15	0.0%
Some other race	959	2.5%
Two or more races	2,926	7.5%
Hispanic or Latino (of any race)	2,628	6.8%

=== 2010 census ===
As of the census of 2010, there were 34,589 people, 11,719 households, and 9,437 families living in the city. The population density was 1,028.8 inhabitants per square mile (397.2/km^{2}). There were 12,102 housing units at an average density of 360.0 per square mile (139.0/km^{2}). The racial makeup of the city was 86.5% White, 3.9% African American, 0.5% Native American, 5.3% Asian, 0.1% Pacific Islander, 1.4% from other races, and 2.3% from two or more races. Hispanic or Latino of any race were 4.8% of the population.

There were 11,719 households, of which 43.7% had children under the age of 18 living with them, 66.6% were married couples living together, 9.3% had a female householder with no husband present, 4.6% had a male householder with no wife present, and 19.5% were non-families. 14.9% of all households were made up of individuals, and 5.3% had someone living alone who was 65 years of age or older. The average household size was 2.95 and the average family size was 3.27.

The median age in the city was 35 years. 29% of residents were under the age of 18; 7.8% were between the ages of 18 and 24; 29% were from 25 to 44; 25.9% were from 45 to 64; and 8.3% were 65 years of age or older. The gender makeup of the city was 49.9% male and 50.1% female.

=== 2000 census ===
As of the census of 2000, there were 30,582 people, 9,932 households, and 8,462 families living in the city. The population density was 899.9 inhabitants per square mile (347.5/km^{2}). There were 10,024 housing units at an average density of 295.0 per square mile (113.9/km^{2}). The racial makeup of the city was 93.54% White, 2.35% African American, 0.41% Native American, 1.43% Asian, 0.06% Pacific Islander, 0.91% from other races, and 1.30% from two or more races. Hispanic or Latino of any race were 2.53% of the population.

There were 9,932 households, out of which 49.8% had children under the age of 18 living with them, 72.9% were married couples living together, 8.8% had a female householder with no husband present, and 14.8% were non-families. 11.0% of all households were made up of individuals, and 2.7% had someone living alone who was 65 years of age or older. The average household size was 3.07 and the average family size was 3.32.

In the city, the population was spread out, with 32.7% under the age of 18, 7.4% from 18 to 24, 34.4% from 25 to 44, 20.7% from 45 to 64, and 4.9% who were 65 years of age or older. The median age was 32 years. For every 100 females, there were 99.3 males. For every 100 females age 18 and over, there were 98.0 males.

=== Income and poverty ===
The median income for a household in the city was $65,825, and the median income for a family was $68,935 (these figures had risen to $79,342 and $84,185 respectively as of a 2007 estimate). Males had a median income of $45,567 versus $31,232 for females. The per capita income for the city was $23,348. About 1.8% of families and 2.2% of the population were below the poverty line, including 3.5% of those under age 18 and 2.6% of those age 65 or over.

== Economy ==
3M has operated a production facility in Cottage Grove since 1947 to manufacture adhesive products, industrial polymers, and reflective road sign materials, and for research and development. PFC production began as a pilot around 1947; full-scale commercial PFOA production began in 1976 and was phased out in 2002. The site is part of the Minnesota Pollution Control Agency Superfund program for perfluorochemical contamination.

== Arts and culture ==
=== Annual cultural events ===
Cottage Grove's annual Strawberry Fest draws thousands of residents together to celebrate. This event is held at Kingston Park, usually in the second week of June. A parade occurs the Saturday of the festival, in which organizations or businesses can have a float, throw out candy, and advertise. On the Saturday of the festival, usually after the parade, organizations and businesses advertise in booths at the soccer fields at Kingston Park. They hand out free things and talk to the residents of Cottage Grove about their businesses. There are fireworks on the Saturday of the festival around 10 pm. There are many carnival games, rides, and food. Every night of the festival except Sunday, bands play in the Kingston parking lot. Alcohol is allowed but only in a designated area.

=== Museums and other points of interest ===
Historic places include Cedarhurst Mansion, Schilling Archeological District, Atkinson Cemetery, Cottage Grove Town Hall, Old People's Home of the Northwest Cemetery, Grey Cloud Lime Kiln, John P. Furber House, Dr. Arthur H. Steen House, First Congregational Church (Accacia Lodge No. 51), William W. Furber House, Cottage Grove Cemetery, Harry Roberts House, Lamar Avenue Larch Trees, and Hope Glen Farm.

Cottage Grove is home to Ravine Regional Park, with the entrance off of Keats Ave S. It is open daily from 6 A.M. to 10 P.M. The park has 515 acres of woods, hills, and prairie fields, creating a unique habitat for an assortment of species. A vehicle permit is required to enter the park grounds.

In 2013, Cottage Grove opened a splash pad at Highland Park off of 70th street. This is a smaller water attraction intended for small children. It has many sprinklers that shoot water. Several other splash pads in the Cottage Grove area are expected to open at other parks.

Cottage Grove has an 18-hole municipal golf course called River Oaks. Known for its lush fairways, challenging greens, and scenic views, the riverside golf course is for players of all skill levels.

Cottage Grove also has an 18-hole disc golf course in Oak Wood park, near its retail area. The course has a variety of different length holes and women's tees.

Cottage Grove had one of the two remaining drive-in theaters in operation in the Twin Cities area, the Cottage View Drive-In. It was near the Innovation Road exit of Highway 61. It closed after the 2012 season and was torn down. The land is now occupied by a Wal-Mart that opened in 2014.

== Government ==
Cottage Grove is in Minnesota's 2nd congressional district, represented by Angie Craig. Its public buildings include City Hall, a three-sheet ice arena, four fire stations, a public works building and an 18-hole championship golf course, River Oaks. Washington County also has two buildings in town, the library and the South Washington County Service Center.

Presidential election results

Precinct General Election Results
Year	Republican	Democratic	Third parties
2020	44.4% 10,141	53.1% 12,129	2.5% 571
2016	44.8% 8,818	45.7% 8,996	9.5% 1,870
2012	45.5% 8,956	52.3% 10,294	2.2% 433
2008	44.5% 8,480	53.1% 10,116	2.4% 452
2004	48.3% 8,694	50.7% 9,132	1.0% 175
2000	43.4% 6,760	51.1% 7,949	5.5% 850
1996	28.9% 3,795	56.8% 7,456	14.3% 1,873
1992	26.2% 3,312	47.0% 5,942	26.8% 3,379
1988	38.6% 3,882	59.5% 5,976	1.9% 190
1984	43.6% 4,030	55.2% 5,094	1.2% 110
1980	37.3% 3,223	51.3% 4,434	11.4% 984
1976	38.1% 2,789	58.9% 4,315	3.0% 216
1968	29.2% 1,069	64.8% 2,375	6.0% 219
1964	26.3% 978	72.3% 2,683	1.4% 51
1960	39.8% 878	59.8% 1,353	1.4% 33

== Education ==
Cottage Grove is part of the South Washington County School District. High School students living in Cottage Grove usually attend either Park High School or East Ridge High School. Cottage Grove also has the school district's Alternative Learning Center (ALC). Middle School students living in Cottage Grove usually attend either Cottage Grove Middle School or Oltman Middle School. Elementary School students usually attend one of the six elementary schools in the city: Armstrong Elementary, Cottage Grove Elementary, Crestview Elementary, Grey Cloud Elementary, Hillside Elementary, and Pine Hill Elementary.

== Infrastructure ==
=== Transportation ===
Mainlines to Chicago of both the Canadian Pacific Railway and BNSF pass through Cottage Grove between US 61 and the Mississippi River.

== Notable people ==
- Seth Appert, National Hockey League Coach
- Michael Birawer, artist
- Mark Doten, novelist and librettist
- Aurilla Furber, poet
- Joseph W. Furber, Minnesota legislator
- Walter R. Hanson, Minnesota state legislator
- Sam Jacobson, former NBA player; born in Cottage Grove
- Kerry Ligtenberg, former MLB pitcher; attended high school in Cottage Grove
- Manila Luzon, entertainer and runner-up on the third season of RuPaul's Drag Race
- Sean O'Connell, retired professional mixed martial artist
- Seann William Scott, actor
