= Hay Lake School =

- U.S. National Register of Historic Places
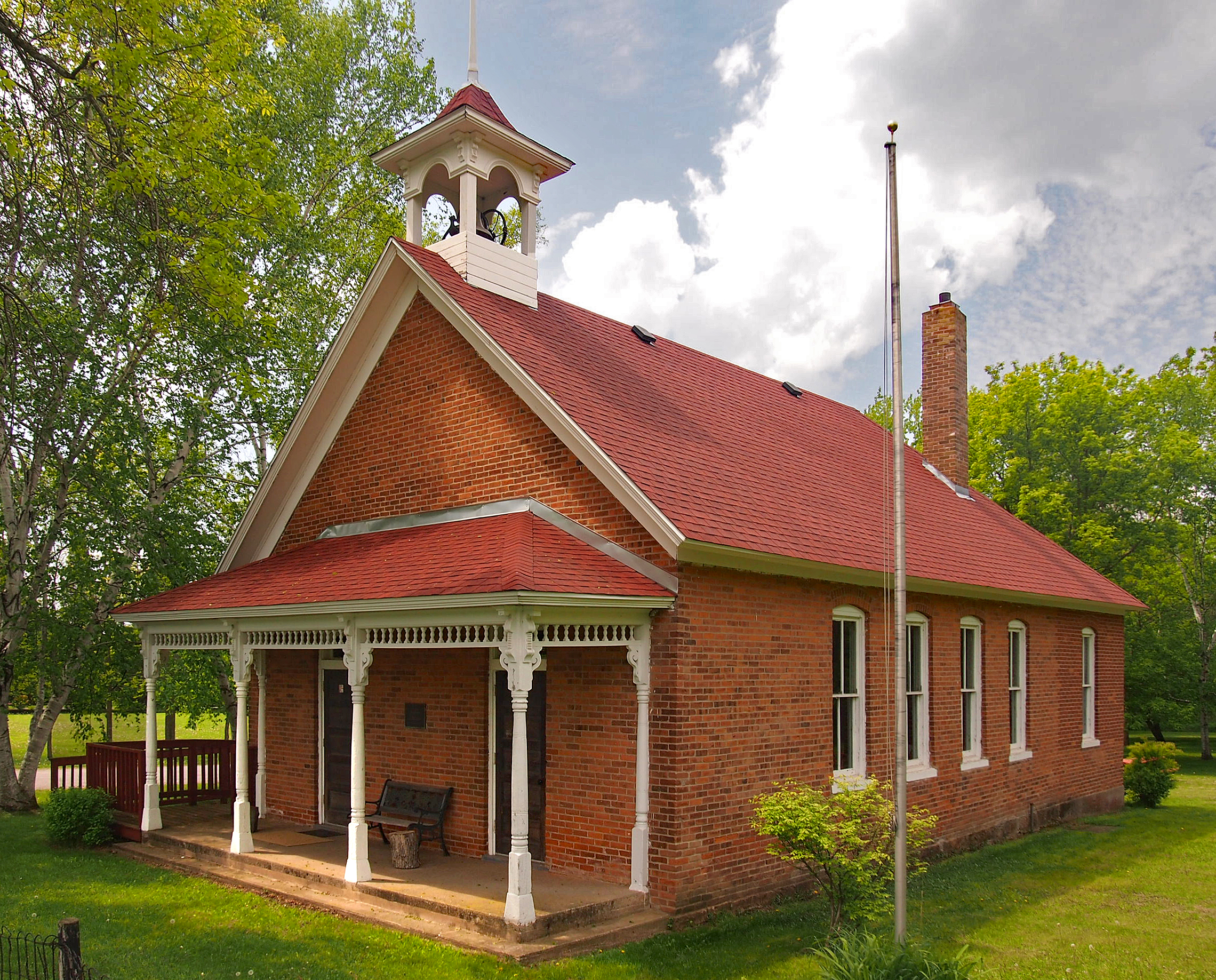
- The Hay Lake School from the northeast

- Location within Minnesota Location within the United States
- Location: 14020 195th Street, Scandia, Minnesota
- Coordinates: 45°13′54″N 92°49′13″W
- Area: 2 acres (0.81 ha)
- Built: 1896
- MPS: Washington County MRA (AD)
- NRHP reference No.: 70000312
- Designated: July 1, 1970

The Hay Lake School is a historic schoolhouse in Scandia, Minnesota, United States, in use from 1896 to 1963. It is now operated by the Washington County Historical Society as a museum alongside the 1868 Johannes Erickson House. The school was listed on the National Register of Historic Places in 1970 for having local significance in the themes of architecture, education, and social history. It was nominated as Scandia's first and only surviving early school.

== Description ==
The Hay Lake School is a small brick building with white trim. The gable roof is topped by a belfry. The main façade on the east has a porch with a decorative lattice frieze, a typical embellishment of the period.

== History ==
The school district for this part of Washington County was organized in 1855, but classes were initially held in various local homes. In 1860 the district acquired the former Elim Lutheran Church, and classes were held there until 1890. This building is now preserved at the nearby Gammelgården Museum. Local residents around Scandia worked to construct the area's first purpose-built school in 1895. One of the lead contributors was Peter Rosell. While carrying a load of bricks intended for the project, however, he broke through ice on the St. Croix River and drowned.

The Hay Lake School was completed in 1896 and served continuously until 1963, when a new school building was constructed nearby. The old building was boarded up and stood vacant for years. In 1970 a group of local residents, many graduates of the school, decided to refurbish the building and open it for tours, helping it gain National Register status in the process. The Washington County Historical Society accepted management of the schoolhouse in 1974, moving the Johannes Erickson House onto the property to form a small museum complex near a 1900 monument to the first Swedish settlers in Minnesota. Four years later the historical society gained full title to the school by purchasing it from the Forest Lake School District.

== See also ==
- List of museums in Minnesota
- National Register of Historic Places listings in Washington County, Minnesota
