= Stillwater Commercial Historic District =

Historic district in Minnesota, United States

- U.S. National Register of Historic Places
- U.S. Historic district
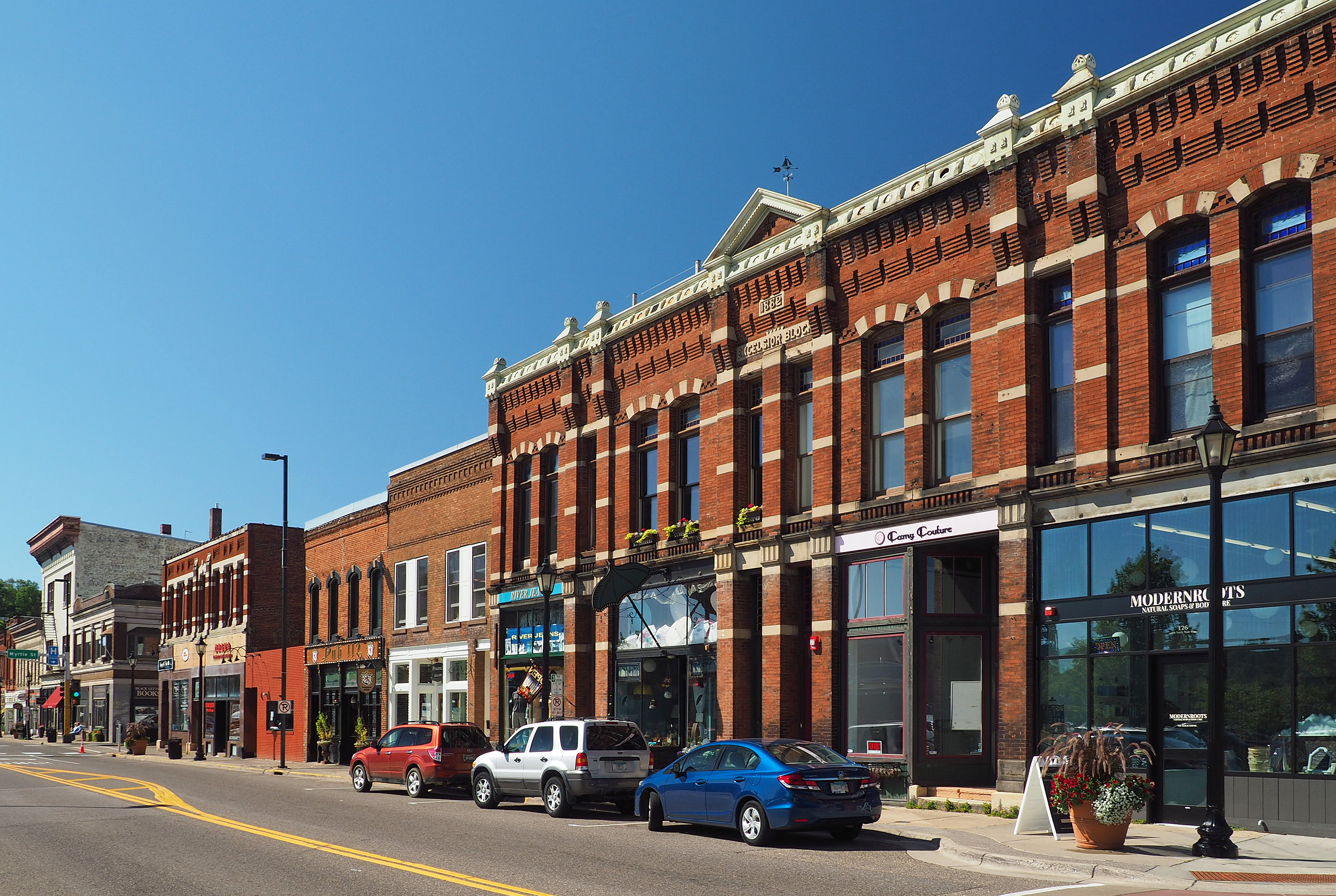
- Part of the Stillwater Commercial Historic District

- Location within Minnesota Location within the United States
- Location: Vicinity of Main, 2nd, and Chestnut Streets, Stillwater, Minnesota
- Coordinates: 45°3′21″N 92°48′21″W
- Area: 25 acres (10 ha)
- Built: 1860–1940
- Architect: Various
- Architectural style: Greek Revival, Italianate, Queen Anne
- NRHP reference No.: 92000288
- Designated HD: March 26, 1992

The Stillwater Commercial Historic District encompasses 11 downtown blocks in Stillwater, Minnesota, United States. It comprises 63 contributing properties built from the 1860s to 1940. It was listed as a historic district on the National Register of Historic Places in 1992 for its local significance in the themes of architecture and commerce. It was nominated for reflecting the economic and architectural diversity of a prosperous lumbering and manufacturing center.

== See also ==
- National Register of Historic Places listings in Washington County, Minnesota
