= Grey Cloud Lime Kiln =

Lime kiln in Cottage Grove, Minnesota

- U.S. National Register of Historic Places
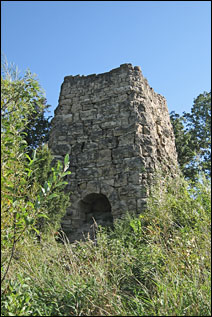
- Grey Cloud Lime Kiln in 2009

- Location within Minnesota
- Location: 10398 Grey Cloud Island Trail, Cottage Grove, Minnesota
- Coordinates: 44°47′55″N 92°58′40″W
- Area: less than one acre
- Built: 1850
- MPS: Washington County MRA (AD)
- NRHP reference No.: 78001568
- Added to NRHP: December 18, 1978

Grey Cloud Lime Kiln is a lime kiln located in Cottage Grove, Minnesota, adjacent to the Mississippi River. It is significant for its association with one of Minnesota's pioneer industries during the state's development. The construction date is unknown, but evidence points to a date around 1850. It was listed on the National Register of Historic Places in 1978.

The limestone burned at this site was used as a building material for the growing cities of St. Paul, Stillwater, and other Mississippi River towns to the south. Farmers also used lime as a soil amendment. The kiln is made of large, rough-cut limestone blocks, laid without mortar, and measures about 20 feet (6.1 m) by 20 feet (6.1 m) at the base. It is 35 feet (11 m) high. The loose stone construction helped with the draft. The interior of the kiln is lined with loose fire bricks. Overall, the design is an early vernacular design, as opposed to the more refined designs built later in the 1800s, such as the G.A. Carlson Lime Kiln in Red Wing, Minnesota, built in 1882.

In June of 2014, the kiln collapsed, and the property owner speculated that it may have happened because of heavy rains.
