= Isaac Staples =

American lumber baron (1816–1898)

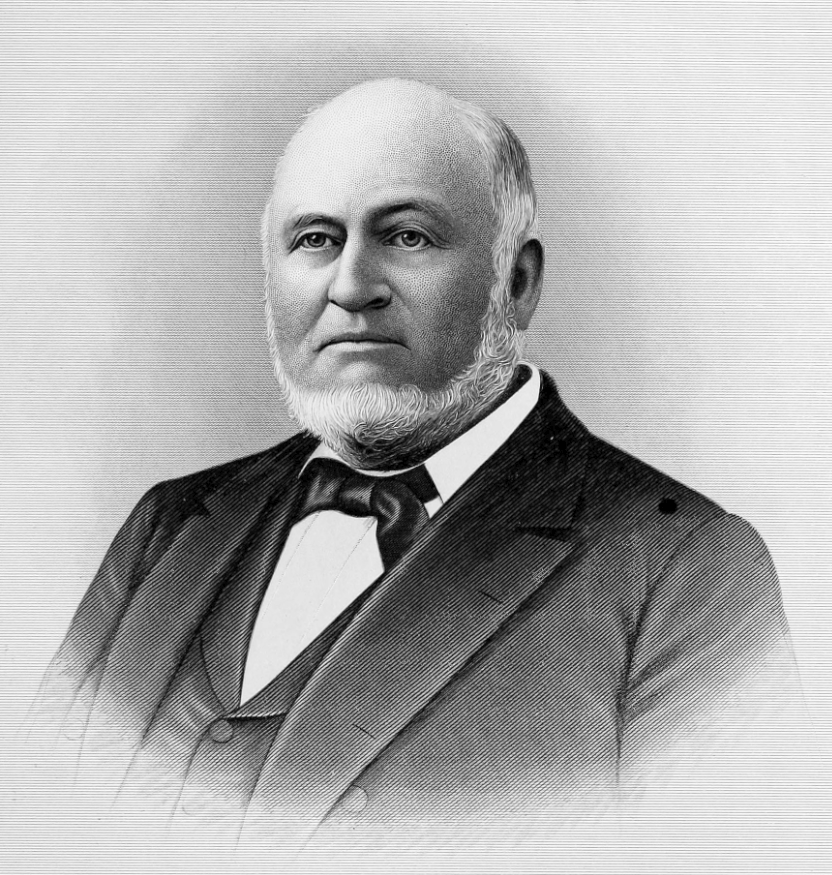
- Born: September 25, 1816; Topsham, Maine
- Died: June 27, 1898 (aged 81); Stillwater, Minnesota
- Occupation: Businessman
- Spouses: Caroline B. Rogers (m. 1839; died 1840) Olivia J. Pettengill (m. 1841)
- Children: 8

Signature
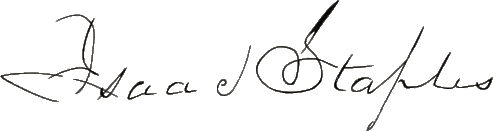

Isaac Staples (September 25, 1816 – June 27, 1898) was a powerful lumber baron in the St. Croix River Valley during the logging boom of the late 19th century.

Aside from his massive holdings and operations in timber, sawmills and the St. Croix Boom Company, Staples was also the region's most successful farmer and an important banker.

== Biography ==
Isaac Staples was born in Topsham, Maine on September 25, 1816. He arrived in Stillwater, Minnesota, the heart of the timber-rich St. Croix River Valley, in 1853 as a representative of eastern investors, including Samuel F. Hersey.

He married Caroline B. Rogers in 1839. She died a year later, and he remarried to Olivia J. Pettengill in 1841. They had four sons and four daughters together.

Staples died in Stillwater on June 27, 1898.
