= Scandia, Minnesota =

City in Minnesota, United States

Scandia
- City
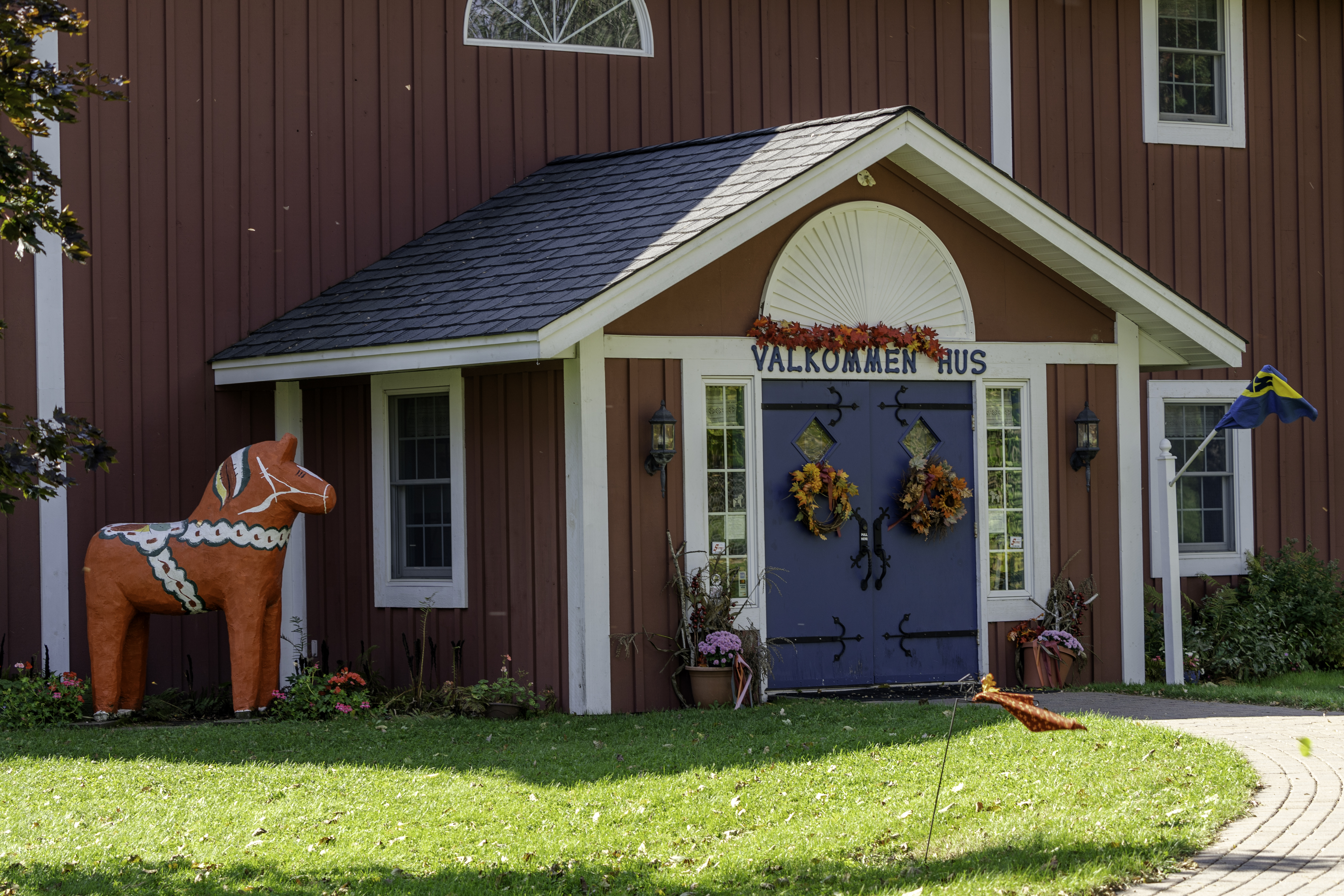
- Gammelgården Museum with Dala horse
- Motto: "Dedicated To Rural Community Values"
- Location of the city of Scandia within Washington County, Minnesota
- Coordinates: 45°15′13″N 92°48′21″W
- Country: United States
- State: Minnesota
- County: Washington

Area
  - Total: 39.85 sq mi (103.22 km^{2})
  - Land: 34.85 sq mi (90.27 km^{2})
  - Water: 5.00 sq mi (12.95 km^{2})
- Elevation: 1,040 ft (320 m)

Population (2020)
  - Total: 3,984
  - Estimate (2021): 3,963
  - Density: 114.3/sq mi (44.14/km^{2})
- Time zone: UTC-6 (CST)
  - Summer (DST): UTC-5 (CDT)
- ZIP code: 55073
- Area code: 651
- FIPS code: 27-58900
- GNIS feature ID: 2396548
- Website: cityofscandia.com

Scandia is a city in Washington County, Minnesota, United States. The population was 3,984 at the 2020 census. Scandia is 25 miles northeast of Saint Paul, Minnesota.

== History ==
As evidenced by the town's name, Scandia has a rich Scandinavian heritage. It is the site of what is believed to have been Minnesota's first Swedish immigrant settlement. In 1850, the first log cabin was built on the shores of Hay Lake. The first sanctuary of Elim Lutheran Church was built in 1856 on a site near Hay Lake.

After many years as New Scandia Township, Scandia became a city on January 1, 2007, to allay concerns that the community could be annexed by the nearby city of Forest Lake. The city is served by a weekly newspaper, the Country Messenger.

== Points of interest ==
- Gammelgården of Scandia has preserved, presented, and promoted Swedish immigrant heritage and history since 1972, with events such as Spelmansstämma, Midsommarafton, and Dalapalooza. The latter is a reference to the Dalecarlian horses the city has erected to welcome visitors.
- Hay Lake School was constructed in 1896. This was rural school district #2, organized in Washington County in 1855. After several years of holding school in local homes, the school was moved into the old Elim Lutheran Church building. The school used that structure, now a part of the Gammelgarden complex, until this brick building was built. The school was placed on the National Register of Historic Places on July 1, 1970.
- The Erickson Log House Museum centers on the log house constructed in 1868 by Johannes Erickson and his 13-year-old son, Alfred. In 1904, Alfred Erickson constructed a new home and the old log home became at various times a granary, a garage, and a playhouse. In 1974, the Washington County Historical Society purchased the old log house and moved it one and a half miles to its present site. The Erickson Log House was placed on the National Register of Historic Places on June 17, 1976.
- The Washington County Barn Quilt Trail is a 16.4-mile (26.39-km) route that winds through Scandia, Marine on St. Croix, and the Town of May. Along the way are 18 barn quilts based on patterns in the book The Quiltmaker's Gift.

== Geography ==
According to the United States Census Bureau, the city has an area of 39.82 square miles (103.13 km^{2}); 34.80 square miles (90.13 km^{2}) is land and 5.02 square miles (13.00 km^{2}) is water. Scandia is halfway between Stillwater and Taylors Falls along the St. Croix River. It is close to William O'Brien State Park. State Highways 95 and 97 are two of the main routes in the community.

== Demographics ==
Historical population
Census	Pop.	Note	%±
2000	3,692		—
2010	3,936		6.6%
2020	3,984		1.2%
2021 (est.)	3,963		−0.5%
U.S. Decennial Census; 2020 Census

=== 2020 census ===
As of the 2020 census, Scandia had a population of 3,984. The median age was 51.4 years. 19.4% of residents were under the age of 18 and 23.1% of residents were 65 years of age or older. For every 100 females there were 106.9 males, and for every 100 females age 18 and over there were 104.7 males age 18 and over.

0.0% of residents lived in urban areas, while 100.0% lived in rural areas.

There were 1,559 households in Scandia, of which 25.7% had children under the age of 18 living in them. Of all households, 68.2% were married-couple households, 14.2% were households with a male householder and no spouse or partner present, and 12.1% were households with a female householder and no spouse or partner present. About 18.6% of all households were made up of individuals and 9.7% had someone living alone who was 65 years of age or older.

There were 1,717 housing units, of which 9.2% were vacant. The homeowner vacancy rate was 0.5% and the rental vacancy rate was 0.0%.

Racial composition as of the 2020 census
Race	Number	Percent
White	3,725	93.5%
Black or African American	10	0.3%
American Indian and Alaska Native	6	0.2%
Asian	23	0.6%
Native Hawaiian and Other Pacific Islander	0	0.0%
Some other race	34	0.9%
Two or more races	186	4.7%
Hispanic or Latino (of any race)	80	2.0%

=== 2010 census ===
As of the census of 2010, there were 3,936 people, 1,499 households, and 1,178 families residing in the city. The population density was 113.1 inhabitants per square mile (43.7/km^{2}). There were 1,704 housing units at an average density of 49.0 per square mile (18.9/km^{2}). The racial makeup of the city was 97.2% White, 0.1% African American, 0.4% Native American, 1.0% Asian, 0.4% from other races, and 0.9% from two or more races. Hispanic or Latino of any race were 1.3% of the population.

Of Scandia's 1,499 households, 30.1% included children under 18, 69.9% were married couples living together, 5.1% had a female householder with no husband present, 3.5% had a male householder with no wife present, and 21.4% were non-families. 17.1% of all households were made up of individuals, and 7% had someone living alone who was 65 or older. The average household size was 2.61 and the average family size was 2.94.

The median age in the city was 46.9. 22.7% of residents were under 18; 5.5% were between 18 and 24; 18.4% were between 25 and 44; 38.9% were between 45 and 64; and 14.5% were over 64. The gender makeup of the city was 51.2% male and 48.8% female.

=== 2000 census ===
As of the census of 2000, there were 3,692 people, 1,294 households, and 1,075 families residing in the township. The population density was 102.7 inhabitants per square mile (39.7/km^{2}). There were 1,389 housing units at an average density of 38.6 per square mile (14.9/km^{2}). The racial makeup of the township was 97.86% White, 0.24% African American, 0.19% Native American, 0.57% Asian, 0.05% Pacific Islander, 0.27% from other races, and 0.81% from two or more races. Hispanic or Latino of any race were 0.76% of the population.

There were 1,294 households, out of which 34.7% had children under the age of 18 living with them, 75.7% were married couples living together, 4.6% had a female householder with no husband present, and 16.9% were non-families. 12.9% of all households were made up of individuals, and 4.5% had someone living alone who was 65 years of age or older. The average household size was 2.84 and the average family size was 3.12.

In the township the population was spread out, with 25.9% under the age of 18, 6.8% from 18 to 24, 26.3% from 25 to 44, 31.7% from 45 to 64, and 9.3% who were 65 years of age or older. The median age was 40 years. For every 100 females, there were 107.1 males. For every 100 females age 18 and over, there were 103.8 males.

The median income for a household in the township was $68,036, and the median income for a family was $76,389. Males had a median income of $45,298 versus $33,333 for females. The per capita income for the township was $27,399. About 2.0% of families and 2.3% of the population were below the poverty line, including 1.2% of those under age 18 and 0.6% of those age 65 or over.

== In popular culture ==
The fifth season of the FX television series Fargo is partially set in a heavily fictionalized version of Scandia.

== See also ==
- Copas, Minnesota
