= Samuel F. Hersey =

American politician (1812–1875)

Samuel Freeman Hersey
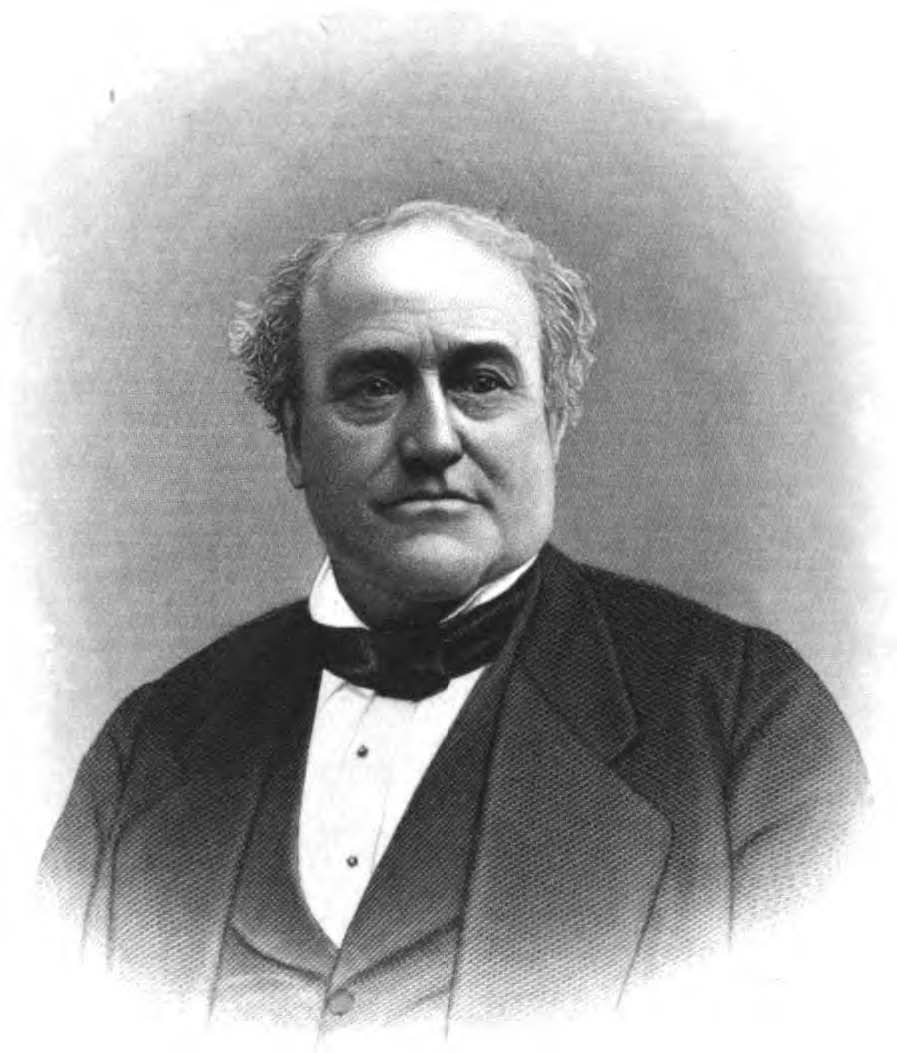

Member of the U.S. House of Representatives from Maine's 4th district
- In office March 4, 1873 – February 3, 1875
- Preceded by: John A. Peters
- Succeeded by: Harris M. Plaisted

Member of the Maine Senate
- In office 1868–1869

Personal details
- Born: April 12, 1812 Sumner, Massachusetts (now Maine)
- Died: February 3, 1875 (aged 62) Bangor, Maine
- Resting place: Mount Hope Cemetery

Samuel Freeman Hersey (April 12, 1812 – February 3, 1875) was a politician and "lumber baron" from the U.S. state of Maine. He served in the Maine State Senate and as a United States congressman from the district which included his hometown of Bangor.

Hersey was born in Sumner, Massachusetts (now Maine), and attended common schools in both Sumner and Buckfield. He also taught school 1828–1831. He graduated from Hebron Academy in 1831.

Hersey engaged in the mercantile business in Lincoln and in Milford; and then in the lumber business in Stillwater, Minnesota, and finally Bangor, where he settled and prospered. Hersey partnered with Isaac Staples to log the St. Croix River pineries along the Minnesota–Wisconsin border. Hersey stayed in Bangor while his eldest son Roscoe represented his interests out west. The 1880 Roscoe Hersey House in Stillwater, Minnesota, is now on the National Register of Historic Places.

In addition to owning timber land he was president of the Market Bank. He was elected as a member of the Maine House of Representatives, and was a delegate to the 1860 Republican National Convention which nominated Abraham Lincoln. Hersey was a close friend and patron of Bangor politician and Abraham Lincoln's Vice President Hannibal Hamlin, which is probably why he served on the Republican National Committee 1864–1868. He was elected to the Maine State Senate in 1868–1869.

Hersey was an unsuccessful candidate for Governor of Maine in 1870, losing by only 20 votes. But he was elected to the Forty-third and Forty-fourth Congresses, serving from March 4, 1873, until his death in Bangor before the close of the Forty-third Congress. He is interred in Mount Hope Cemetery.

Hersey is often styled "General Hersey" in contemporary documents, which is a state militia title dating to the time of the Aroostook War. During the Northeastern Boundary Dispute of 1839–42 he served as Commanding Colonel of the newly formed 6th Regiment of the 1st Brigade and 3rd Division which included the rapidly growing communities on the east of the Penobscot River north of Milford to the Saint John River. His men were the first responders to the kidnapping of State Land Agent Rufus McIntyre. When the Aroostook was organized into a County in 1840 and the 9th Division of the Maine State Militia was formed, he joined Colonel John Carpenter of Lincoln as the first commanders. He retired from the Maine State Militia as a major general commanding the 9th Division of the Maine State Militia before removing to Bangor, the headquarters of Maine's Third Militia Division.

Hersey left his fortune to the city of Bangor, Maine, which used it to found the Bangor Public Library and built a new City Hall (which was demolished in the late 1960s during "Urban Renewal"). A large portrait of Hersey still hangs in the Bangor Public Library.

== See also ==
- List of members of the United States Congress who died in office (1790–1899)

U.S. House of Representatives
Preceded by John A. Peters	Member of the U.S. House of Representatives from Maine's 4th congressional district March 4, 1873 – February 3, 1875	Succeeded by Harris M. Plaisted
