= School section =

A school section is a 640-acre plot of land in the United States, designated for the benefit of the public schools.

School section may also refer to:

- School Section Lake in Minnesota
- School Section Lake National Wildlife Refuge in North Dakota
