= Point Douglas–St. Louis River Road Bridge =

- Point Douglas-St. Louis River Road Bridge
- U.S. National Register of Historic Places
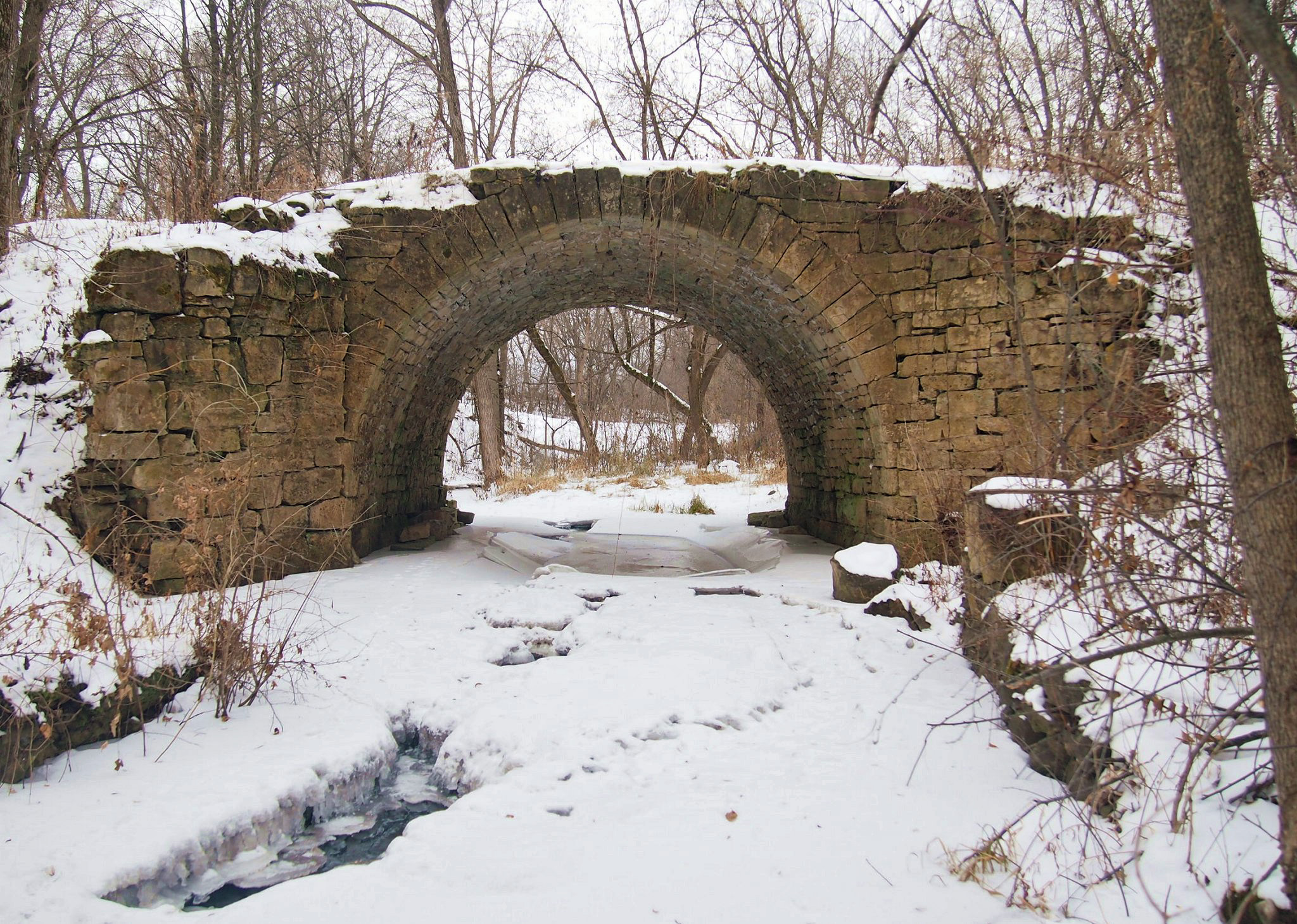
- The Point Douglas–St. Louis River Road Bridge viewed from the east

- Location within Minnesota Location within the United States
- Location: Off County Highway 5, Stillwater Township, Minnesota
- Coordinates: 45°4′32″N 92°49′44″W
- Area: 0.5 acres (0.20 ha)
- Built: 1865
- Architect: William Willim
- MPS: Washington County MRA (AD)
- NRHP reference No.: 75001033
- Designated: February 24, 1975

The Point Douglas–St. Louis River Road Bridge, built in 1865, is the second oldest known stone arch bridge in the state of Minnesota after Sibley's Ferry Bridge in Mendota, which was built in 1864. It was constructed in Stillwater Township to carry the Point Douglas to Superior Military Road over Brown's Creek. The bridge was listed on the National Register of Historic Places in 1975 for having local significance in the themes of engineering and transportation. It was nominated as an example of stone engineering and as a remnant of Minnesota's early government roads.

== History ==
The road that was carried by the bridge was built as one of Minnesota's earliest road construction projects. When Minnesota became a territory in 1849, there were few land transportation routes other than the Red River Trails, although water transportation was possible along the rivers. Henry Hastings Sibley, who later became Minnesota's first governor, appealed to the United States Congress in 1850 for funds to build a network of military roads in Minnesota Territory. The Minnesota Road Act was passed in July 1850. The Point Douglas to Superior Military Road was authorized from Point Douglas (north of present-day Hastings), through Cottage Grove, Stillwater, Marine Mills (now Marine on St. Croix), Falls of St. Croix (now Taylors Falls), and to the "Falls or Rapids of the Saint Louis River of Lake Superior". The presumed purpose of these military roads was to provide a way for army troops to move quickly to an area where they were needed, but in practice these roads were more often used by civilians traveling between existing settlements or settling new areas.

James H. Simpson, an officer in the U.S. Army and a member of the United States Corps of Topographical Engineers, was placed in charge of road construction. As specified in his construction bid, the original bridge built during the construction of the military road was wooden. Federal involvement in the road projects ended after Minnesota became a state, and the last personal left Saint Paul in 1861. By 1863, it was clear a new, sturdier bridge was needed. On September 2, 1863, a contract was made with Michael Hanley and Fredrick Curtis for the construction of a stone bridge across Brown's Creek by the Washington County Commissioners. But, when Curtis and Hanley appeared before the County Commissioners to receive payment, on November 20, 1863, the commissioners stated that their contract was not fulfilled and their work was not accepted for unknown reasons. On August 3, 1865, a motion was made to have Commissioner William Willim lead and oversee the construction of a replacement bridge. Commissioner Willim's bridge was completed and accepted by the County on October 17, 1865 at a cost of $1197.38. Brown's Creek had been diverted south to power one of the first sawmills in Stillwater, and the remaining trickle was easy to ford. The Point Douglas to St. Louis River Road was never fully completed as a military road because Congress only allocated $10,000, $15,000, or $20,000 at a time, so Sibley and other representatives had to keep appealing to Congress for more funds to complete the roads. By 1858, the year Minnesota became a state, two-thirds of the Point Douglas to St. Louis River Road was substantially complete.

The bridge is built of locally quarried limestone by Washington County Commissioner William Willim, who also was a stone and plaster contractor. The stone bridge was used until about 1891, when a wider wood bridge was built about 200 feet (60 m) east of the stone bridge, and the road was shifted onto a new alignment. In 1905 a local miller incorporated the bridge into a three-story mill on the site. The mill did not succeed, and it was torn down in 1927, leaving only the bridge.

== See also ==
- List of bridges on the National Register of Historic Places in Minnesota
- National Register of Historic Places listings in Washington County, Minnesota
