= Godillot Place =

Historic house in Connecticut, United States

- U.S. National Register of Historic Places
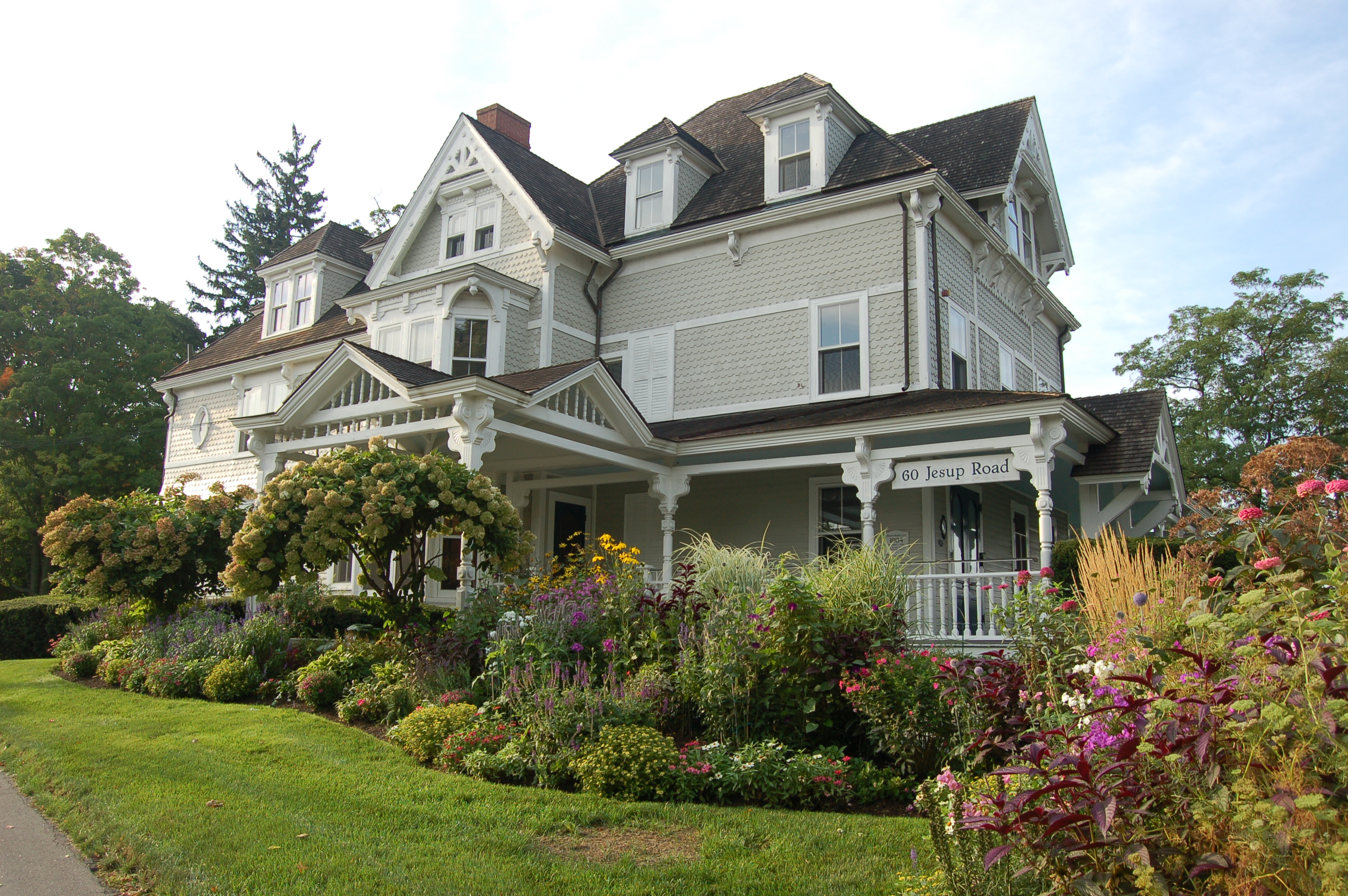

- Location within Connecticut Location within the United States
- Location: 60, 65 Jesup Road, Westport, Connecticut
- Coordinates: 41°8′25″N 73°21′35″W
- Area: 3.1 acres (1.3 ha)
- Built: 1879
- Architect: Palliser, Palliser & Co.
- Architectural style: Stick/Eastlake
- NRHP reference No.: 77001396
- Added to NRHP: August 29, 1977

Godillot Place is a historic country estate at 60 and 65 Jesup Road in Westport, Connecticut. The main house, now known as the Lyman Building, built c. 1880 around an 1804 farmhouse, is Westport's best example of Stick style architecture. The estate also includes a late 19th-century carriage house and guest cottage, all now owned by the town. The property was listed on the National Register of Historic Places in 1977.

== Description and history ==
Godillot Place occupies a distinctive position among Westport's cluster of civic buildings on Jesup Road, set on 3.1 acres (1.3 ha) at the junction with Bay Road just east of the police station. The main house is a 2 1/2-story wood-frame structure, with asymmetrical massing characteristic of the late 19th century. It has a busy roofline that has projecting gable sections and dormers that have decorative shingling and overlaid Stick woodwork. Across the street from the main house stand a carriage house and barn that date to the time of the major alterations.

The oldest portion of the house, its western end, was built in 1804 by Ebenezer Jesup for his daughter Abigail. The property was acquired in 1879 by Julia Godillot, daughter of a local merchant and wife of a French importer. The Godillot's expanded the estate, landscaping its grounds and constructing several outbuildings, of which the cottage and carriage house survive. The design of the house has been attributed to Palliser, Palliser & Co., a New York City architectural pattern book publisher; it bears some resemblance to a plate in the firm's American Cottage Homes pattern book. The property was sold out of the Godillot family in 1920. The house was subsequently used as a boarding house and then divided into apartments. The town purchased the property in 1953.

== See also ==
- National Register of Historic Places listings in Fairfield County, Connecticut
