= William D. Bishop Cottage Development Historic District =

Historic district in Connecticut, United States

- U.S. National Register of Historic Places
- U.S. Historic district
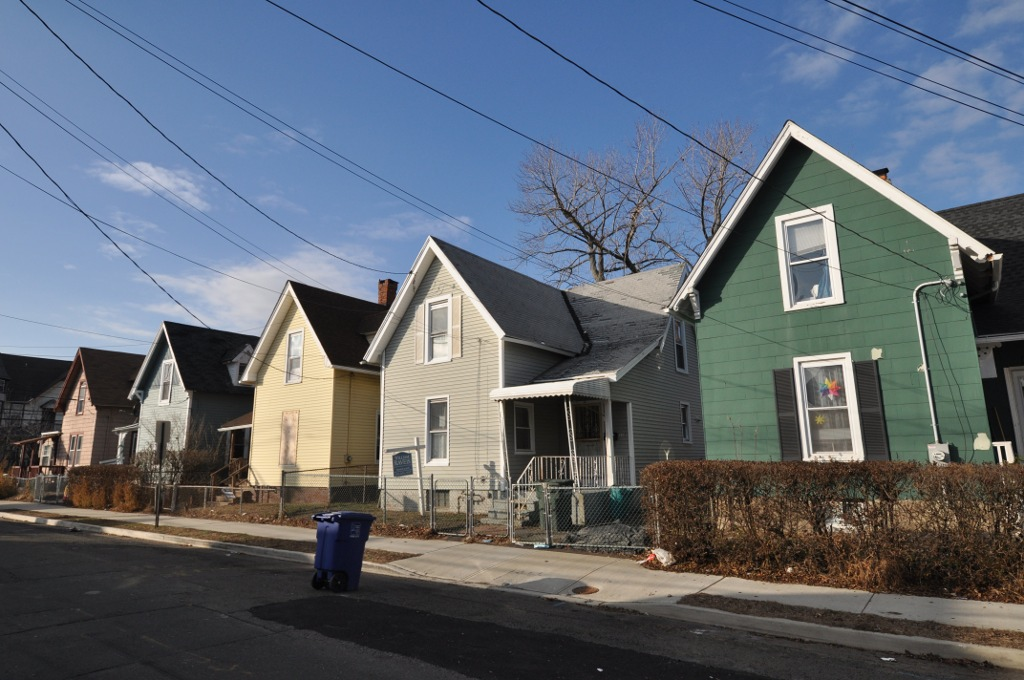
- A row of cottages on Cottage Place

- Location within Connecticut Location within the United States
- Location: Cottage Place and Atlantic, Broad, Main and Whiting Streets, Bridgeport, Connecticut
- Coordinates: 41.16796°N 73.18655°W
- Area: 3.1 acres (1.3 ha)
- Built: 1880
- Built by: Gould Bros.
- Architect: Palliser, Palliser & Company
- Architectural style: Gothic, Queen Anne, Italianate, Greek Revival, Other
- NRHP reference No.: 82004388
- Added to NRHP: June 28, 1982

The William D. Bishop Cottage Development Historic District, also known as the Cottage Park Historic District, encompasses a historic planned working-class residential community in the South End of Bridgeport, Connecticut. The district most prominently includes 35 1 1/2-story wood-frame cottages with Carpenter Gothic styling, developed in 1880 and 1881 by the Bishop Realty Company and probably designed by Palliser, Palliser & Company. It was one of the first such planned developments in the city, and was listed on the National Register of Historic Places in 1982.

== Description and history ==
Cottage Park is located in Bridgeport's South End, just north of the northeastern tip of Seaside Park. It occupies about 3 acres (1.2 ha), bounded by Broad and Main Streets to the east and west, Whiting Street to the north, and roughly Henry Street to the south. The cottages that make up its principal defining feature are primarily located on Atlantic Street and Cottage Place, which run east–west between Broad and Main. All 35 cottages are frame structures with clapboarded walls, board-and-batten gables, and Gothic trim. The cottages on Atlantic Street exhibit more variety than those on Cottage Place, with the one at Atlantic and Main in particular featuring a tower with pyramidal roof.

The development was the idea of William Darius Bishop, a wealthy local businessman and one-term Congressman. The cottages were apparently built to designs (or minor variants) from published works of Palliser, Palliser & Company, a Bridgeport-based architectural firm whose pattern books sold nationwide. The Palliser firm also designed the brick row house at 256-270 Broad Street, which is included in this district. The development was sited to be near the downtown and waterfront, and for its proximity to Seaside Park, which would provide recreational opportunities for the residents.

== See also ==
- National Register of Historic Places listings in Bridgeport, Connecticut
