= Stillwater Township, Washington County, Minnesota =

Stillwater Township, Minnesota
- Township
- Location within the state of Minnesota
- Coordinates: 45°4′54″N 92°49′7″W
- Country: United States
- State: Minnesota
- County: Washington

Area
  - Total: 17.5 sq mi (45.4 km^{2})
  - Land: 16.5 sq mi (42.8 km^{2})
  - Water: 0.97 sq mi (2.5 km^{2})
- Elevation: 932 ft (284 m)

Population (2020)
  - Total: 1,866
- Time zone: UTC-6 (Central (CST))
  - Summer (DST): UTC-5 (CDT)
- ZIP codes: 55082, 55083
- Area code: 651
- FIPS code: 27-62842
- GNIS feature ID: 0665712
- Website: https://stillwatertownshipmn.gov/

Stillwater Township is a township in Washington County, Minnesota, United States. The population was 1,866 at the 2020 census.

== Geography ==
According to the United States Census Bureau, the township has a total area of 17.5 square miles (45.4 km^{2}), of which 16.5 square miles (42.8 km^{2}) is land and 1.0 square mile (2.5 km^{2}) (5.59%) is water. Minnesota State Highways 95 and 96 are two of the main routes in the township.

The township contains eight properties listed on the National Register of Historic Places: the precolumbian St. Croix River Access Site, the 1863 Point Douglas–St. Louis River Road Bridge, the 1872 Pest House, the 1877 Bridge No. 5721, the late-1870s Henry Stussi House, the circa-1885 St. Croix Boom Company House and Barn, the 1911 Soo Line High Bridge, as well as the St. Croix Boom Site, which is a National Historic Landmark.

== Demographics ==
As of the census of 2000, there were 2,553 people, 833 households, and 736 families residing in the township. The population density was 154.3 inhabitants per square mile (59.6/km^{2}). There were 842 housing units at an average density of 50.9 per square mile (19.7/km^{2}). The racial makeup of the township was 98.28% White, 0.12% African American, 0.24% Native American, 1.02% Asian, 0.04% Pacific Islander, 0.04% from other races, and 0.27% from two or more races. Hispanic or Latino of any race were 0.55% of the population.

There were 833 households, out of which 45.9% had children under the age of 18 living with them, 83.0% were married couples living together, 3.2% had a female householder with no husband present, and 11.6% were non-families. 8.6% of all households were made up of individuals, and 2.6% had someone living alone who was 65 years of age or older. The average household size was 3.06 and the average family size was 3.28.

In the township the population was spread out, with 30.6% under the age of 18, 6.3% from 18 to 24, 26.0% from 25 to 44, 32.0% from 45 to 64, and 5.1% who were 65 years of age or older. The median age was 40 years. For every 100 females, there were 100.2 males. For every 100 females age 18 and over, there were 103.6 males.

The median income for a household in the township was $96,281, and the median income for a family was $100,560. Males had a median income of $70,000 versus $45,833 for females. The per capita income for the township was $36,795. About 0.5% of families and 0.6% of the population were below the poverty line, including 0.8% of those under age 18 and none of those age 65 or over.
