= Point Douglas to Superior Military Road =

Point Douglas to Superior Military Road, also known as Point Douglas to St. Louis River Military Road was a road that ran between Point Douglas, located at the outlet of the Lower St. Croix Lake near Hastings, Minnesota, first to the falls of the St. Louis River near Thomson, Minnesota, and later extended to the mouth of the St. Louis River in Superior, Wisconsin. From Douglas Point immediately east of Hastings, Minnesota, the route connected Stillwater, Taylors Falls, Sunrise, Chengwatana, Fortuna, Scotts Corner, to Thomson and Superior. Several discontinuous sections of this road are still in use.

== History ==
In 1852, the federal government began building the Point Douglas to Superior Military Road. Although intended as a highway for troop movement, this route from Hastings, Minnesota on the Mississippi River to Superior, Wisconsin on Lake Superior, was one of the first roads in Minnesota Territory and attracted a flood of civilian and commercial traffic. When Minnesota achieved statehood in 1858, responsibility for the road devolved to the state, which did not have the funds to finish the project. Although very rough and in places incomplete, the road was still the best route north until railroads were built in 1870. An alternative to the Military Road that ushered in the decline in use of the road came in 1895 when William Henry Grant built a spur of the Lake Superior and Mississippi Railroad to run to Sandstone, Minnesota. Traces of the unimproved military road can still be seen in Wild River State Park and Banning State Park.

== Landmarks ==
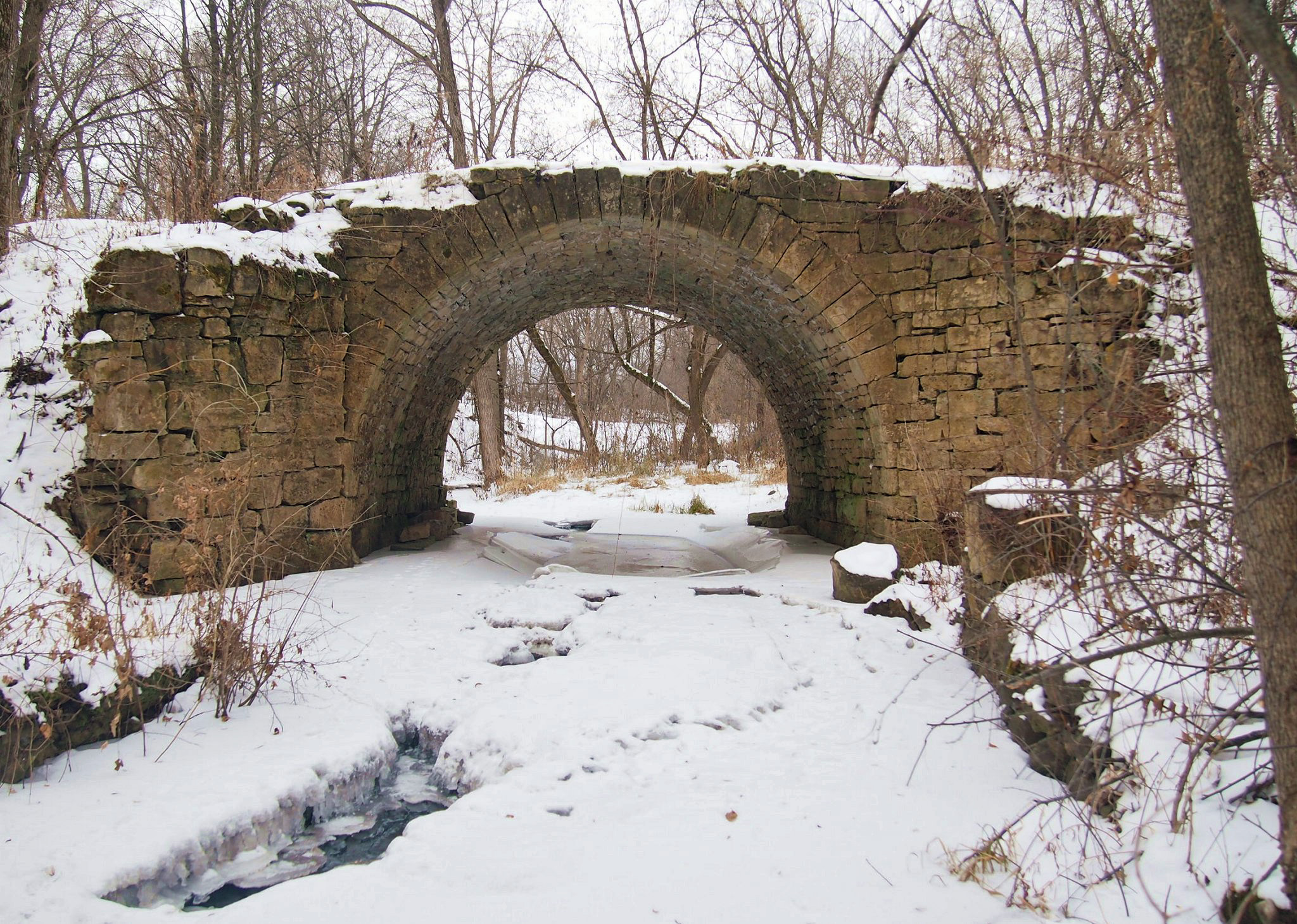
The Point Douglas–St. Louis River Road Bridge in Stillwater Township, Minnesota

- Point Douglas to Superior Military Road: Deer Creek Section, Wild River State Park
- Point Douglas–St. Louis River Road Bridge, Stillwater, Minnesota

== Existing sections ==
- St. Croix Trail / County Road 21, Washington County, Minnesota
- St. Croix Trail / Minnesota Highway 95, Washington and Chisago Counties, Minnesota
- Lake Boulevard / U.S. Highway 8 / Minnesota Highway 95, Taylors Falls, Minnesota
- Vista Road / County Road 71, Shafer, Chisago County, Minnesota
- Wild Mountain Road / County Road, Amador Township, Chisago County, Minnesota
- Deer Creek Loop, Wild River State Park, Minnesota
- River Road, Amador and Sunrise Townships, Chisago County, Minnesota
- Sunrise Road / County Road 9, Sunrise Township, Chisago County, Minnesota
- Government Road / County Road 57, Sunrise and Rushseba Townships, Chisago County, Minnesota
- Government Road / County Road 55, Rushseba Township, Chisago County, Minnesota
- Government Road / County Road 106, Rock Creek, Pine County, Minnesota
- Government Road / County Highway 4, Rock Creek and Pine City Township, Pine County, Minnesota
- Government Road, Pine City Township, Pine County, Minnesota
- Cross Lake Road / County Highway 9, Pine County, Minnesota
- Hinckley Road / County Highway 15, Mission Creek, Munch and Barry Townships, Pine County, Minnesota
- Government Road / County Road 140, Barry Township, Pine County, Minnesota
- Government Road, Barry and Sandstone Townships, Pine County, Minnesota
- Old Military Road, Sandstone, Minnesota
- Wolf Creek Trail, Banning State Park, Minnesota
- Interstate Highway 35, Finlayson Township, Pine County, Minnesota
- Old Military Road, Norman Township, Pine County, Minnesota
- Military Road, Norman and Windemere Townships, Pine County, Minnesota
- Military Road / County Highway 50, Pine County, Minnesota
- Military Road, Windemere Township, Pine County, Minnesota
- Military Road / County Road 13, Carlton County, Minnesota
- Military Road / Township Road 389, Carlton County, Minnesota

Original routing

- County Road 4, Carlton County, Minnesota
- County Road 1, Carlton County, Minnesota

Extended routing

- County Road 4, Carlton County, Minnesota
- County Road W, Douglas County, Wisconsin
- 31st Avenue East, Superior, Wisconsin
