= Benedict-Miller House =

Historic house in Connecticut, United States

- U.S. National Register of Historic Places
- U.S. Historic district – Contributing property
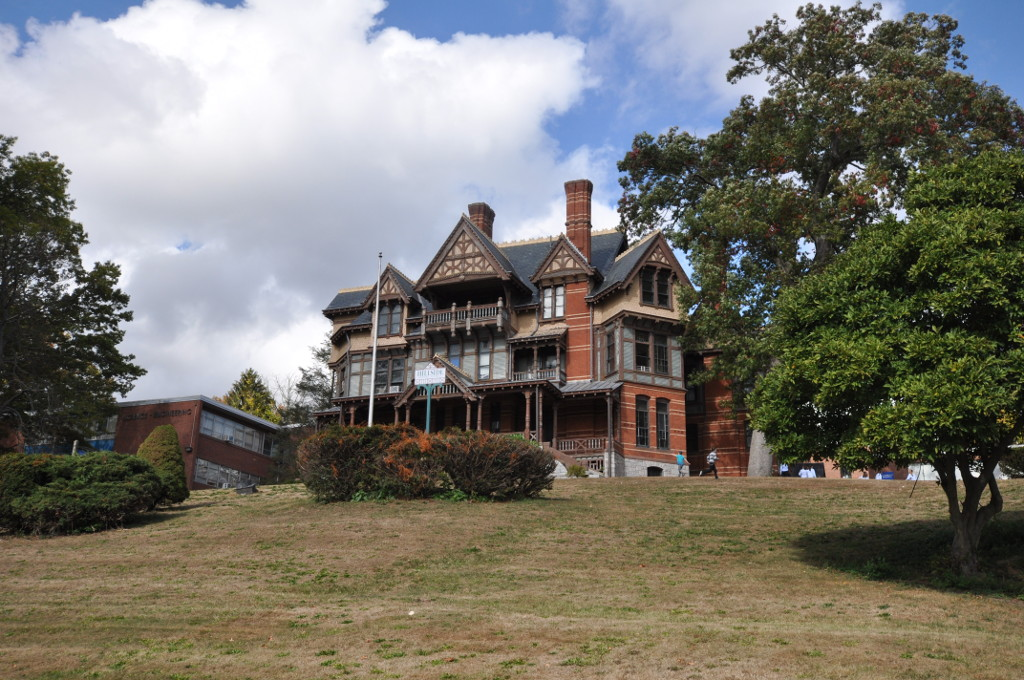

- Location within Connecticut Location within the United States
- Interactive map showing the location for Benedict-Miller House
- Location: 32 Hillside Avenue, Waterbury, Connecticut
- Coordinates: 41°33′42″N 73°02′30″W
- Area: 2.5 acres (1.0 ha)
- Built: 1879
- Architect: Palliser, Palliser & Co.
- Architectural style: Stick/eastlake, Queen Anne
- Part of: Hillside Historic District (ID87001384)
- NRHP reference No.: 81000616

Significant dates
- Added to NRHP: June 12, 1981
- Designated CP: August 20, 1987

The Benedict-Miller House is a historic house at 32 Hillside Avenue in Waterbury, Connecticut. Built in 1879, it is one of the city's finest surviving examples of Queen Anne architecture, designed by Palliser, Palliser & Co. for one of the city's leading industrialists. It was listed on the National Register of Historic Places in 1981. The house is now part of the campus of the Yeshiva K'tana.

== Description and history ==
The Benedict-Miller House is located in a residential area three blocks north of Waterbury's downtown West Main Street area, on the north side of Hillside Avenue at its junction with First Avenue. It occupies a large grassy parcel, and is set well back from the road, with a fine view over the downtown and industrial areas of the city. The house is a three-story wood-frame structure, with asymmetrical massing and plan typical of the Queen Anne style. Its exterior is clad in a variety of finishes, including brick on the lower levels, wooden paneling, and varying styles of cut wooden shingles on the upper levels. A variety of porches and gabled dormers add rich variety to the exterior, most retaining the turned posts and balustrades characteristic of the period. The interior of the house is also replete with high quality original period finishes.

The house was completed in 1880 for Charles Benedict, a leading industrialist in Waterbury's dominant brass works. It was designed by Charles and George Palliser, and exhibits many elements found in the pattern books they published. It is one of only two grand houses to survive that were built for the city's 19th-century industrial leaders. The house was the second to be built for Benedict, who acquired the land in 1869 and originally had an Italianate estate house built. Benedict died in 1881, apparently before the family finished moving in. It was sold by his daughter in 1889 to Charles Miller, a local dry goods merchant. The city purchased the surviving elements of the subdivided estate in 1952, and it served for a time as part of the Waterbury campus of the University of Connecticut.

== See also ==
- National Register of Historic Places listings in New Haven, Connecticut
