= Barnum–Palliser Historic District =

Historic district in Connecticut, United States

- U.S. National Register of Historic Places
- U.S. Historic district
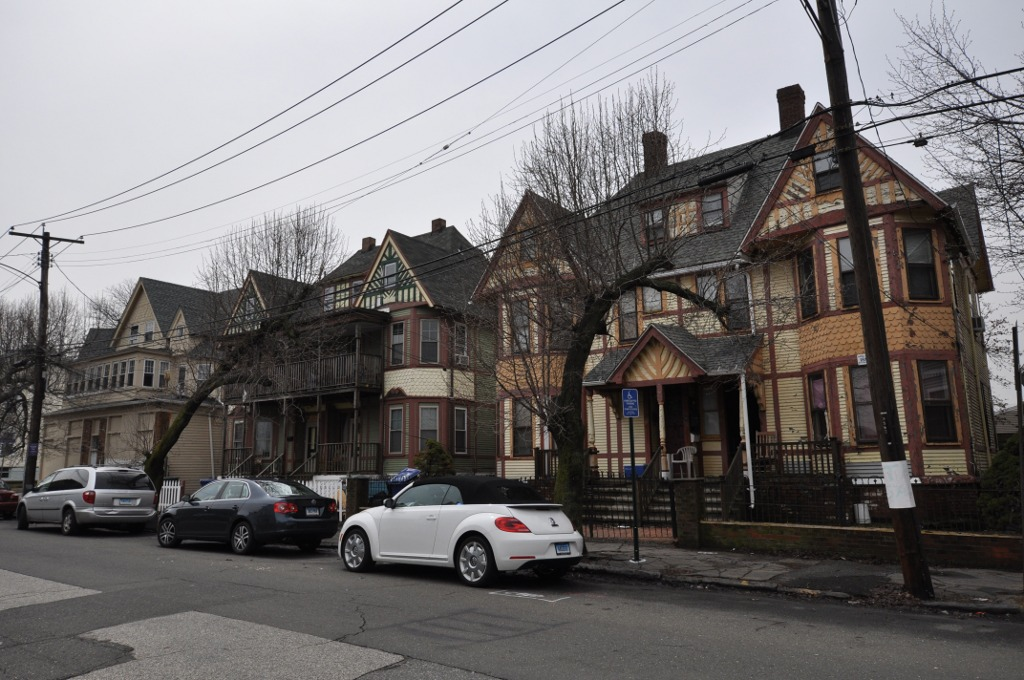

- Location within Connecticut Location within the United States
- Location: Roughly bounded by Myrtle and Park Avenues, Atlantic and Austin Streets (both sides), Bridgeport, Connecticut
- Coordinates: 41°10′4″N 73°11′3″W
- Area: 5.9 acres (2.4 ha)
- Architect: Palliser, Palliser & Co.
- Architectural style: Italianate, Queen Anne, Stick/Eastlake
- NRHP reference No.: 82000995
- Added to NRHP: December 16, 1982

The Barnum–Palliser Historic District is a 5.9-acre (2.4 ha) residential historic district in Bridgeport, Connecticut. The area, bounded roughly by Austin Street, Myrtle Avenue, Atlantic Street, and Park Avenue, was developed by P.T. Barnum to provide worker housing in the 1880s. Many of the houses were designed by Palliser, Palliser & Co., and are interesting examples of Italianate, Queen Anne, and Stick/Eastlake architecture. The district was listed on the National Register of Historic Places in 1982.

== Description and history ==
The Barnum–Palliser Historic District is located about 3/4 mile south of downtown Bridgeport, just south of the railroad tracks and Interstate 95. Most of the district consists of single and two-family houses on Austin, Gregory, and Atlantic Streets between Park and Myrtle Avenues. Houses are typically of wood-frame construction, and would originally have had wooden clapboard or shingled exteriors. Twenty-two of the 35 properties were designed by Palliser, Palliser & Co. One house, the Brooks-Knapp/Keating House which was built c. 1830, was moved to its current site at 349–351 Myrtle Avenue in 1878. One good example of the Pallisers' work is the James H. Jones House, at 341 Myrtle Avenue, which was built in 1878 and which seems to be an implementation of Design 23 in Palliser's "Model Homes for the People". Also notable is 373-377 Myrtle, which was the home of George and Charles Palliser. The only non-residential building in the district is the Myrtle Avenue/Jefferson School, which has a Beaux-Arts brick facade and front section and an earlier Victorian frame section in the rear which was contemporaneous to the residential development.

The area was developed by businessman P.T. Barnum in the 1880s, after he purchased the land from the estate of Ezra Wheeler in 1876. Barnum was well known for his support of the working classes, and this was one of several residential developments he funded in the city. He worked with the Pallisers, who were also involved in several residential development projects in the city.

== See also ==
- National Register of Historic Places listings in Bridgeport, Connecticut
