= Palliser, Palliser & Company =

Historic architectural firm and publisher of architectural pattern books

Palliser, Palliser & Company was a Bridgeport, Connecticut, and New York City architectural firm and publisher of architectural pattern books.

George Palliser, the firm's founder, was born around 1849 in Thirsk, Yorkshire, England. He emigrated to Newark, New Jersey in 1868. He worked as a carpenter and builder, later opening a millwork business.

In search of new territory, Palliser moved to Bridgeport in 1873, opening an architectural office. He would specialize in residential work. In 1877 he made his brother, Charles Palliser, a partner in the firm, which became Palliser, Palliser & Company. They remained in Bridgeport until 1882, when increasing business necessitated a move to New York. The Pallisers kept the Bridgeport office open as a branch through the 1880s, but would eventually close it in favor of the New York office.

By the 1890s, George Palliser was practicing alone, though the old firm-name of Palliser, Palliser & Company was often retained for publications. He died in 1903.

The Pallisers published many books of architectural plans. The first was Model Homes for the People in 1876. Copies of the 23-page pattern book were sold for 25 cents a copy and "sent into every State and territory in the Union, and many to the provinces." Other publications included American Cottage Homes (1878), Palliser's Model Homes (1883), Palliser's New Cottage Homes (1887), American Architecture; Or, Every Man a Complete Builder (1888), Palliser's Court Houses, Village, Town and City Halls, Jails and Plans of Other Public Buildings (1889), Palliser's Useful Details (1890), and Low Cost Houses Adapted for Florida (1892), and Late Victorian Architecture (1896).

Palliser designs were built nationwide. Upon choosing a design from one of the firm's many publications, the client would write to the main office and request full plans, as well as necessary alterations. The plans would then be sent.

A number of buildings built from Palliser, Palliser & Company designs are listed on the U.S. National Register of Historic Places.

Works include (with attribution):

- Several works in Barnum/Palliser Historic District, roughly bounded by Myrtle and Park Avenues, Atlantic and Austin Streets (both sides), Bridgeport, Connecticut (Palliser, Palliser & Co.), NRHP-listed
- Several works in Division Street Historic District, roughly bounded by State Street, Iranistan, Black Rock and West Avenues, Bridgeport, Connecticut (Palliser, Palliser & Co.), NRHP-listed
- Benedict-Miller House, 32 Hillside Avenue, Waterbury, Connecticut (Palliser, Palliser & Co.), NRHP-listed
- Several works in William D. Bishop Cottage Development Historic District, Cottage Place and Atlantic, Broad, Main and Whiting Streets, Bridgeport, Connecticut (Palliser & Palliser), NRHP-listed
- Sheldon Boright House, 122 River Street, Richford, Vermont (Palliser's American Cottage Homes), NRHP-listed
- Godillot Place, 60, 65 Jesup Road, Westport, Connecticut (Palliser, Palliser & Co.), NRHP-listed
- A. B. Leavitt House, ME 158, Sherman, Maine (Palliser, Palliser & Co.), NRHP-listed
- George Seybold House, 111 E. Main Street, Waveland, Indiana (Palliser, Palliser & Co.), NRHP-listed
- Henry Stussi House, 9097 Mendel Road, Stillwater, Minnesota (Palliser & Palliser), NRHP-listed
- Chamberlain-Hunt Academy's original buildings, McComb Hall and Guthrie Hall, built in 1900.

== See also ==
- Grand Opera House, 2012-2020 Avenue E, Galveston, Texas (Barnes & Palliser), NRHP-listed
- John C. and Mary Landenberger House, 58 N. Virginia Street, Salt Lake City, Utah (Palliser & Mills), NRHP-listed
