= Brown's Creek (St. Croix River tributary) =

- Mouth of Brown's Creek

Location
- Country: United States
- State: Minnesota
- Region: Washington County
- City: Stillwater

Physical characteristics
- Source
  - location: Withrow, Minnesota
  - coordinates: 45°07′08″N 92°53′57″W
  - elevation: 992 ft (302 m)
- Mouth: Confluence with the St. Croix River
  - location: Stillwater, Minnesota
  - coordinates: 45°07′08″N 92°53′57″W
  - elevation: 670 ft (200 m)

Brown's Creek is a 9.7-mile-long (15.6 km) stream which originates about 5.5 miles northwest of the city of Stillwater and flows south for about half its length then east to its confluence with the St. Croix River just north of Stillwater in Washington County, Minnesota, United States. It is one of few creeks in the Minneapolis – Saint Paul "Twin Cities" metropolitan area that supports a fishable trout population.

== History ==
The creek's name is from the founder of the first settlement in the Stillwater area, Joseph R. Brown, where Brown's Creek (then Pine Creek) flows into the St. Croix River. In 1840 Brown, a former soldier, Indian trader, promoter, and Justice of the Peace set up a small warehouse at the head of Lake St. Croix to supply his upriver fur trading operations. This warehouse, in what is now the north part of Stillwater, became the county seat of St. Croix County, Wisconsin Territory. Brown began building a courthouse and jail and importing settlers for his new village, which he named Dacotah. Several of Brown's relatives, including his half-sister Lydia Ann and her husband, Paul Carli, moved into a house built of tamarack logs. The Tamarack House, well known as “Mrs. Carli’s,” became a favorite stopping place for travelers on the St. Croix River. However, few other settlers arrived in Dacotah until a mill was built to the south in what became Stillwater.

== Watershed and course ==
The watershed includes School Section Lakes, Goggins Lake, Long Lake and Benz Lake. Brown's Creek flows through the Brown's Creek Park and Nature Preserve northwest of Stillwater, then proceeds east to its confluence with the St. Croix River. At one time in its history, Brown's Creek was diverted into McKusick Lake, which supplied water to Stillwater residents. By 1955 fisheries managers recognized that warm lake water was putting a strain on the trout population in Brown's Creek. In an effort to reduce water temperatures for the benefit of trout, a dike was constructed to separate the stream from the lake and return the flow back to Brown's Creek. The dike still exists today. Brown's Creek underwent a re-route in the fall of 1999 that shortened this section of the stream from 5,130 feet to 2,000 feet in order to lower water temperatures by avoiding water warming in the previous meander through a wetland just north of Lake McKusick, increasing stream velocity and decreasing organic matter in the stream. This project by the city of Stillwater and the Minnesota Department of Natural Resources also restored natural riparian vegetation as the creek traverses the Oak Glen Golf Course.

== Ecology ==
Brown's Creek has been listed as impaired since 2002 by the Minnesota Pollution Control Agency because of low indices of biological integrity (IBI) for fish and macroinvertebrates. Factors (all likely related to runoff) which harm fish and invertebrates include total suspended solids (TSS), high temperature, low dissolved oxygen (DO) and two pollutants: copper and nitrate-nitrite (NOx). NOx levels were higher than nitrite concentrations known to produce brown blood disease, lower productivity in trout, and other non-lethal impairments to trout growth and reproduction.

The creek has been stocked with non-native Brown trout (Salmo trutta) by the Minnesota Department of Natural Resources, Division of Fisheries since 1955. Stillwater students have been monitoring water quality in Brown's Creek since 1998. Recently there is a controversy where brown trout proponents are concerned that native beaver (Castor canadensis) dams are warming water temperatures and acting as an impediment to trout passage. However, the plan to set lethal traps to kill the beavers is controversial as the presence of beaver dams has been shown in scientific studies to increase the number of brown trout, their size, or both, in the Sierra Nevada and also in a study of small streams in brown trout's native Sweden, that found that the fish were larger in beaver ponds compared with those in riffle sections, and that beaver ponds provide habitat for larger trout in small streams during periods of drought. Deep water in beaver ponds provides critical winter refuge from ice in small streams like Brown's Creek. Also, as beaver dams raise the groundwater table, a larger hyporheic zone is created which may be important to trout spawning.

== See also ==
- Brown trout
- North American beaver
