= St. Croix Boom Company House and Barn =

Historic house in Minnesota, United States

- U.S. National Register of Historic Places
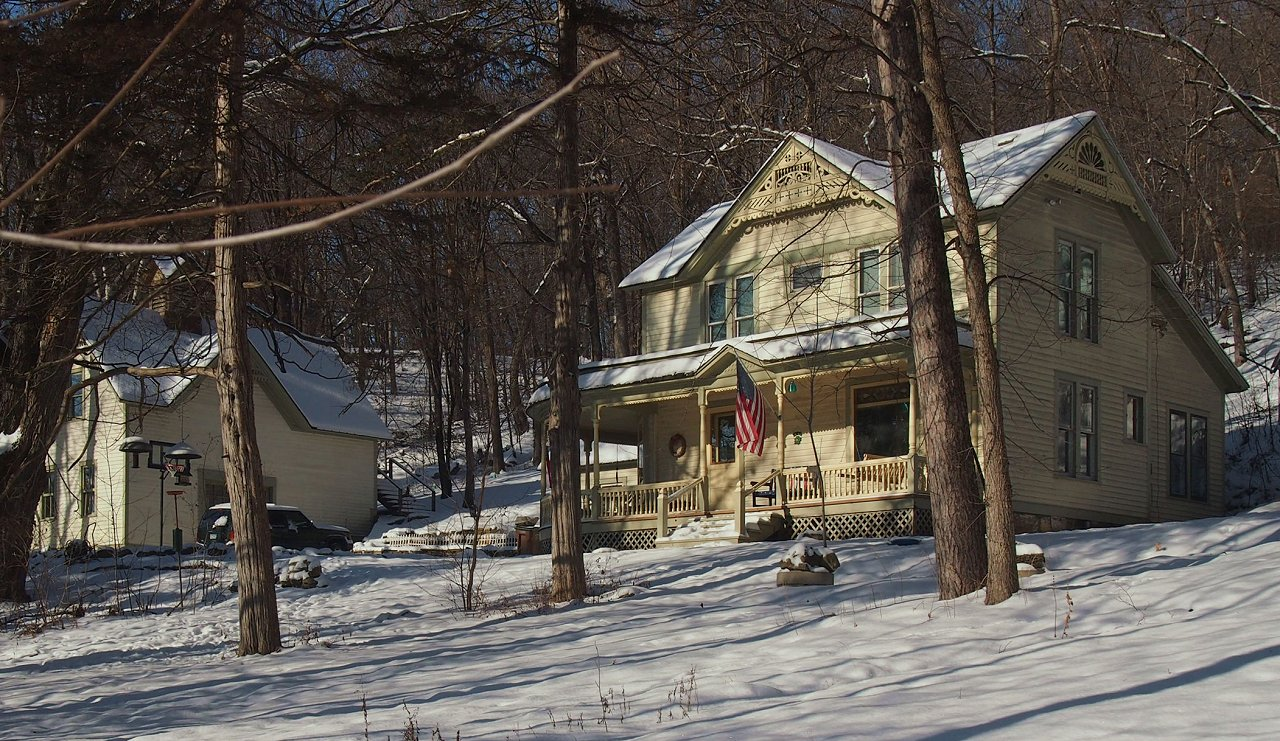
- The St. Croix Boom Company House and Barn viewed from the east

- Location within Minnesota Location within the United States
- Location: 9666 N. St. Croix Trail, Stillwater Township, Minnesota
- Coordinates: 45°5′11.4″N 92°47′5.2″W
- Area: 1 acre (0.40 ha)
- Built: c. 1885
- Architectural style: Queen Anne
- MPS: Washington County MRA (AD)
- NRHP reference No.: 80000409
- Designated NRHP: June 3, 1980

The St. Croix Boom Company House and Barn is a historic residence in Stillwater Township, Minnesota, United States, built circa 1885. It was listed on the National Register of Historic Places in 1980 for its local significance in the theme of industry. It was nominated as the only known standing building associated with the St. Croix Boom Company, which operated a log boom critical to Minnesota's logging industry from 1856 to 1914.

== Description ==
The St. Croix Boom Company House and Barn is located directly across Minnesota State Highway 95 from the St. Croix Boom Site, two miles (3.2 km) north of the city of Stillwater. The house has two stories while the barn has one and a half. Both are sided with clapboard and sport decorative spindlework on their gables. The house has a one-story wraparound porch. Originally built on a simple rectangular plan, the house has been modified with additions to the south and west, plus a dormer on the west.

== History ==
The house and barn were built around 1885 for W. Frank McGray, who served as the superintendent of the boom site for 34 years, from 1871 to 1905. McGray and his family had been living on a farm on the Wisconsin side of the St. Croix River until his employer built him this official residence on company property adjacent to the boom site. McGray purchased the house from the Boom Company in 1895 and continued to live in it from his retirement in 1905 until he sold the property in 1919.

McGray had worked for the Boom Company since its founding in 1856, and he reportedly sent the first log through on opening day. When the log boom closed on June 12, 1914, the 80-year-old retired superintendent was honored by being the one to send the last log through as well.

== See also ==
- National Register of Historic Places listings in Washington County, Minnesota
