= St. Croix River Access Site =

- U.S. National Register of Historic Places
- Location: Address restricted, Stillwater Township, Minnesota
- Built: 800–1700 CE
- NRHP reference No.: 84001712
- Designated NRHP: August 23, 1984

The St. Croix River Access Site (Smithsonian trinomial 21WA49) is a prehistoric Native American archaeological site on the St. Croix River in Stillwater Township, Minnesota, United States. It consists of a habitation site with a large quantity of stone tool artifacts, occupied from roughly 800 to 1700 CE. It was listed on the National Register of Historic Places in 1984 for having local significance in the theme of archaeology. It was nominated for its scientific potential to illuminate Late Woodland period cultural relationships, lithic technology, and resource use.

The St. Croix River Access Site was discovered during an archaeological field survey for the Minnesota Department of Transportation in 1983. 21 excavation units were dug, which showed that the center of the site had been destroyed by industrial activity in the 1930s but that archaeological deposits to either side remained intact. 100 ceramic sherds were found. These were identified with four different cultural complexes—the Kathio–Clam River, St. Croix, Sandy Lake, and Madison—indicating that the site had been occupied by different cultures over the span of the Late Woodland Period. Fire-cracked rocks suggested a hearth. Most significant, though, were pieces of animal bone and 886 stone tool fragments and lithic flakes. The lopsided ratio of lithic artifacts to ceramics suggests that groups utilized the site temporarily for a specific purpose, such as for bone or hide processing.

== See also ==
- National Register of Historic Places listings in Washington County, Minnesota
