= Hillside Historic District (Waterbury, Connecticut) =

Historic district in Connecticut, United States

- U.S. National Register of Historic Places
- U.S. Historic district
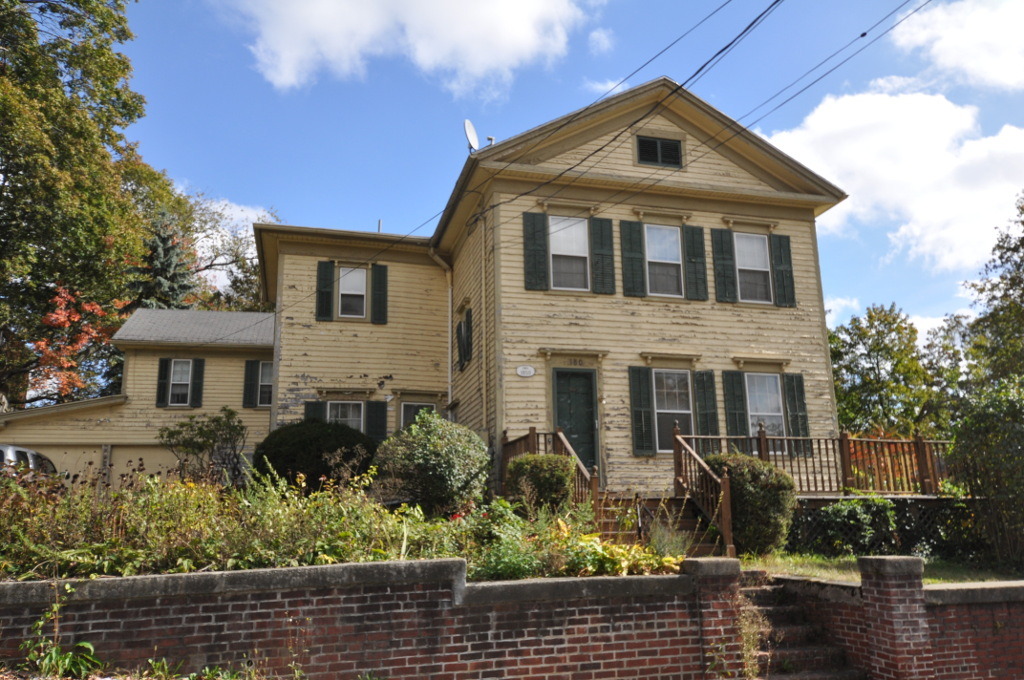

- Location within Connecticut Location within the United States
- Interactive map showing the location for Hillside Historical District
- Location: Roughly bounded by Woodlawn Terrace, West Main, and Willow Streets, Waterbury, Connecticut
- Coordinates: 41°33′37″N 73°2′28″W
- Area: 106 acres (43 ha)
- Architect: Multiple
- Architectural style: Mid 19th Century Revival, Late 19th And 20th Century Revivals, Queen Anne
- NRHP reference No.: 87001384
- Added to NRHP: August 20, 1987

The Hillside Historic District in Waterbury, Connecticut is a 106-acre (43 ha) historic district that was listed on the National Register of Historic Places (NRHP) in 1987. It encompasses a residential area north of the city's central business district, and is bounded on the south by West Main Street, the west by Willow Street and Cliff and Frederick Streets, on the north by Buckingham Street and Woodland Terrace, and on the east by Cooke Street. Developed principally over an 80-year period between 1840 and 1920, it includes a cross-section of architectural styles of the 19th and early 20th centuries. The area was a desirable neighborhood of the city for much of this time, and was home to a number of the city's elite. In 1987, it included 395 buildings deemed to contribute to the historic character of the area, and one other contributing structure. It includes the Wilby High School and the Benedict-Miller House, which are both separately listed. 32 Hillside Road, a several acre property that includes the Benedict Miller House, was the original site of The University of Connecticut's Waterbury Branch until 2003.

The oldest houses in the district are Greek Revival in style, and are located along its major roads, West Main and Cook Streets. The largest number of houses in the district are Queen Anne in style, reflective of the city's growth in the late 19th century. Early Victorian styles are present in smaller numbers, with a particularly fine examples of the Gothic Revival at 63 Prospect Street and the Italianate at 36 Buckingham Street. There are also a significant number of Colonial Revival and Tudor Revival houses, particularly along Prospect Street and Woodlawn Terrace. Non-residential properties include the 1889 Driggs School building on Woodlawn Terrace, and the Baptist and Christian Science churches, both built c. 1917.

== See also ==
- National Register of Historic Places listings in New Haven County, Connecticut
