= St. Croix Boom Site =

- U.S. National Register of Historic Places
- U.S. National Historic Landmark
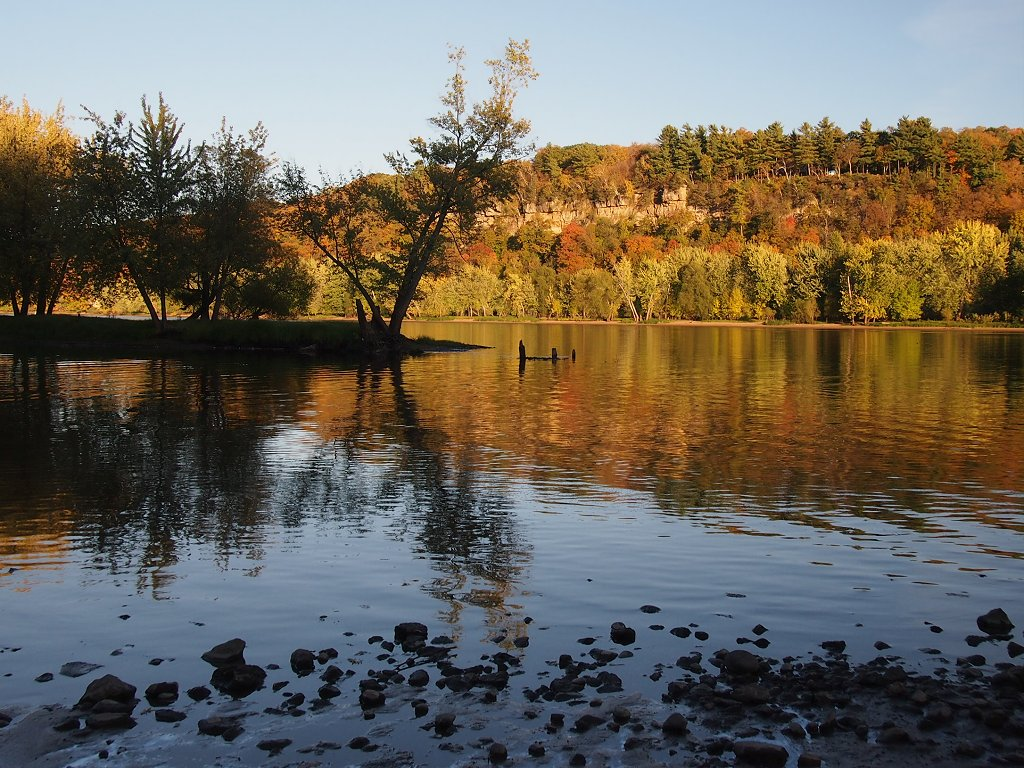
- Former site of the St. Croix Log Boom

- Location within Minnesota Location within the United States
- Location: Off Minnesota State Highway 95, Stillwater Township, Minnesota
- Coordinates: 45°5′6″N 92°47′8″W
- Area: 26.1 acres (10.6 ha)
- Built: 1856
- MPS: Washington County MRA (AD)
- NRHP reference No.: 66000407

Significant dates
- Designated NHL: November 13, 1966
- Designated NRHP: November 13, 1966

The St. Croix Boom Site is a historic and scenic wayside on the St. Croix River in Stillwater Township, Minnesota, United States. It commemorates the location of a critical log boom where, from 1856 to 1914, timber from upriver was sorted and stored before being dispatched to sawmills downstream. The site was developed as a roadside park along Minnesota State Highway 95 in the 1930s. In 1966 it was designated a National Historic Landmark for its national significance in the theme of industry. It was nominated for being the earliest, most important, and longest serving of the log storage and handling operations that supported Minnesota's major logging industry. Virtually no traces remain of the site's original buildings and structures.

== Origin ==
The vast white pine forests of the St. Croix River Valley became a major target for logging in the mid-19th century. The St. Croix and its tributaries provided easy transport downstream. Moreover, the St. Croix flowed directly into the Mississippi River, making a convenient route to the burgeoning communities all down the length of the nation plus the numerous inland settlements they served. Since multiple logging companies sent their timber down the same waterway, each company had a distinctive "timber mark" or "owner's mark" they stamped into the bottom of each log. In the 1830s and 40s the St. Croix harvest was collected and sorted downstream on an honor system, but the increasing number of companies and logs soon necessitated a more official approach.

In 1851 the Minnesota Legislature chartered the St. Croix Boom Company, granting them the right to collect all logs at a certain point on the river, sort them according to mark, and deliver them to the appropriate owners in return for 40 cents per thousand board feet (17 cent/m^{3}). The Boom Company's leadership was largely composed of men from Marine, Taylors Falls, and Osceola, so the boom was initially located near Taylors Falls. However, there were two major problems with this. One was that this was upstream from the mouth of the Apple River, the St. Croix's second-most productive tributary. The other was that Stillwater was already becoming the region's primary lumber town, and mills there had to pay extra to have their logs timber rafted 21 miles (34 km) downstream.

In 1856 the Boom Company ran into financial trouble, so a syndicate of Stillwater-based lumbermen led by Isaac Staples seized their opportunity to purchase and relocate the operation. Staples, familiar with log booms from his native Maine, picked an ideal site for the new boom. It was 3 miles (4.8 km) north of Stillwater in a stretch of the river that was narrow, high-banked, and naturally divided into multiple channels by small islands.

== Operation ==
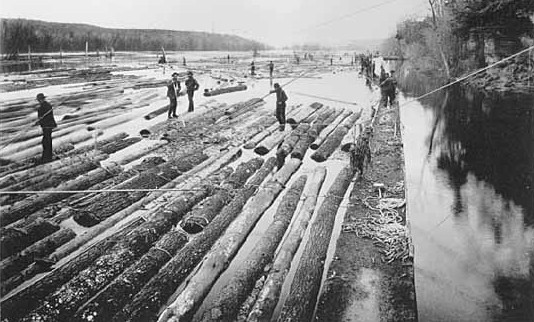
The St. Croix Boom Site around 1886

The St. Croix Log Boom used a series of booms—logs chained end-to-end across the river—to catch timber as it floated downstream. Workers called "boom rats" moved among the booms on catwalks, noting the timber marks stamped on the incoming logs and sorting them into holding pens. When enough of one brand were gathered, the boom workers would form them into a timber raft, which a "fitting-up crew" would steer downstream to the correct mill. Some receiving mills were as far south as St. Louis.

The boom operation was designed in such a way that it could handle both heavy and light volumes efficiently. In mid-summer logs could be backed up for 15 miles (24 km) above the boom, and hundreds of workers put in long days. However, in slow times the whole operation could run with a skeleton crew, leading to considerable labor savings.

In 1890 the Boom Company completed the Nevers Dam 11 miles (18 km) upstream from Taylors Falls to control the flow of logs even further and to prevent log jams like the 1886 St. Croix River log jam that had disrupted the business.

== Impact ==
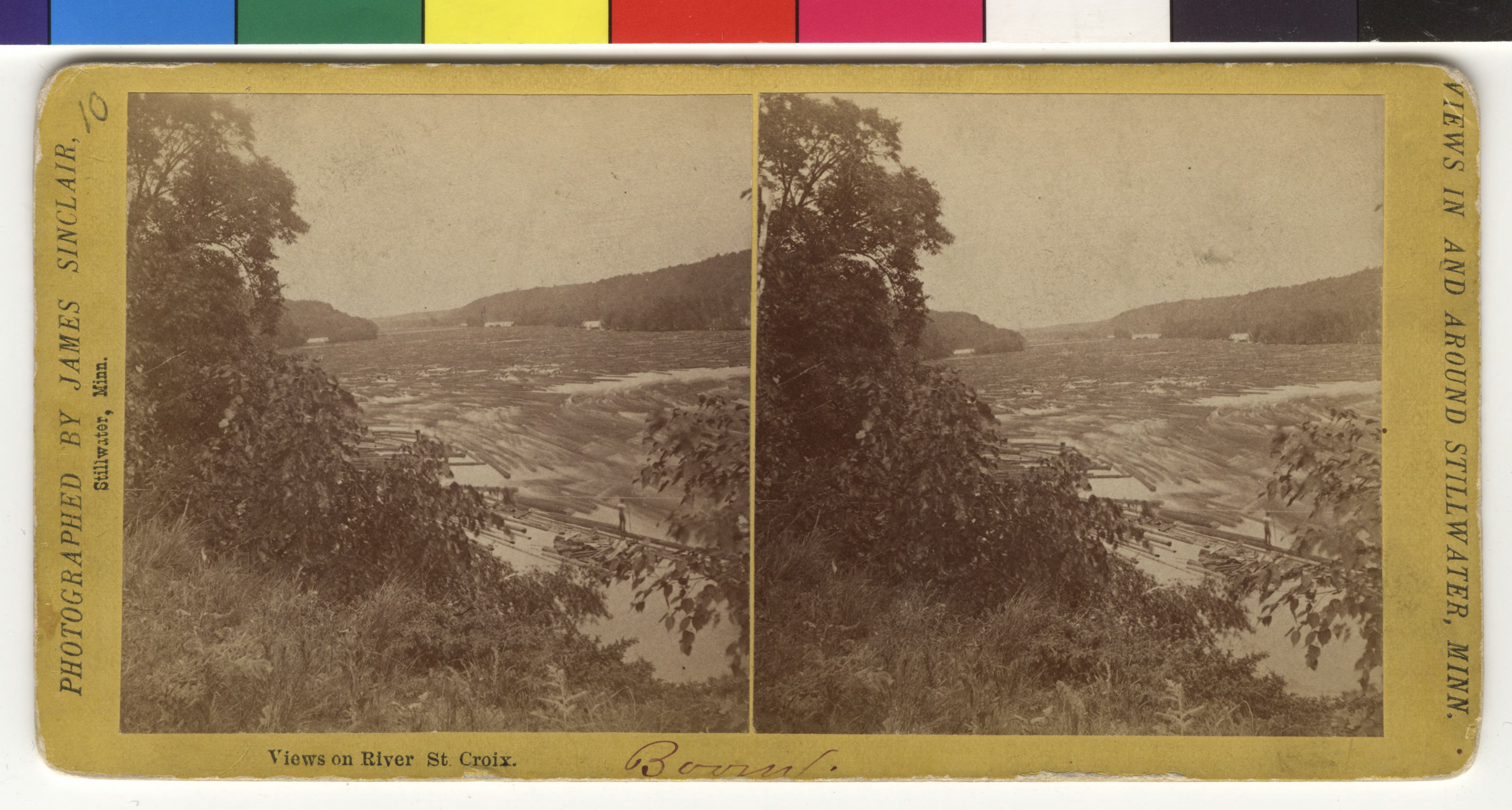
Stillwater boom full of floating logs on the St. Croix River, Stillwater, Minnesota

The massive volume of logs on the river and the centrality of the St. Croix Boom Company to the all-important lumber industry led to major regional impacts. At peak times the log-choked river was impassable to steamboats. Travelers couldn't move upstream or downstream, farmers couldn't ship their goods to market, and towns like Taylors Falls were starved economically. Jumbles of logs could block drainage, flooding riverside farms and homes. The Boom Company did endeavor to provide teams and wagons to portage passengers and goods around blocked areas, transferring them to small steamboats upstream so they could continue their journeys. In the 1860s and 70s the company worked on a shipping canal to bypass the boom site.

Millers, dependent on the Boom Company to deliver their logs, complained bitterly about any delays as well as the cost of the service. When logs weren't coming in, work was scarce, money was tight, and everyone in the lumber towns felt the pinch. The Boom Company had such economic and political clout that it became known as "The Octopus".

However the Boom Company made it possible for 150–200 lumber companies to work the St. Croix and its tributaries. Feeding all the lumberjacks, log drivers, and sawmill workers fueled the agricultural sector throughout the river valley. When the 8,500-square-mile (22,000 km^{2}) valley had been denuded of its salable timber, and the St. Croix Boom closed on June 12, 1914, it had processed over 15.5 billion feet of logs. Thanks to the quantity of timber, generous sorting fee enshrined in state law, and ability to scale labor efficiently, the St. Croix Boom was the most profitable in the entire Midwestern United States.

== Wayside history ==
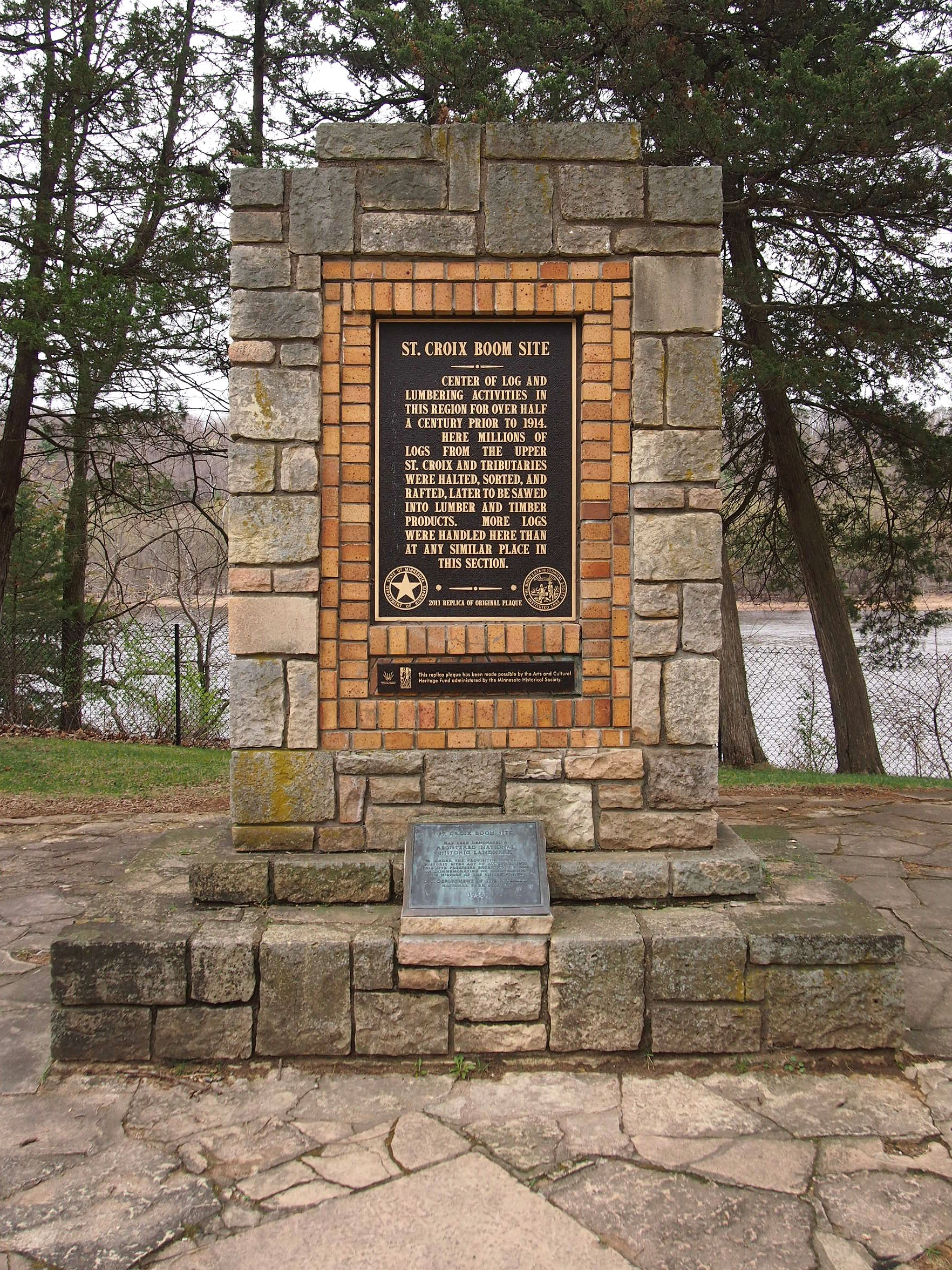
St. Croix Boom Site historical marker

The St. Croix Boom Site was one of the state's first sites to receive a roadside historical marker when the Minnesota Department of Highways began collaborating with the Minnesota Historical Society around 1929. A few years later as the Department of Highways began establishing scenic waysides throughout the state, the Boom Site was developed into a historic and recreational Roadside Parking Area as part of the extensive roadside improvements targeted around Stillwater.

The St. Croix Boom Site Roadside Parking Area was developed 1935–1939 using New Deal federal labor relief programs, which had been instituted to combat widespread unemployment during the Great Depression. Landscape architect Arthur R. Nichols designed the plans while construction was largely carried out by young men employed through the National Youth Administration (NYA). They constructed a more permanent historical marker, a picnic area, fire rings, toilets, a stone wall, a guardrail, and a staircase down to the riverbank. They also landscaped the site, planting trees and improving a natural spring.

In 1966 the site was declared a National Historic Landmark and listed on the National Register of Historic Places. Three years later the former Highway Department, renamed the Minnesota Department of Transportation (or MnDOT), modernized the wayside. At that time the original restrooms, retaining wall, and fence were replaced, a parking area was redesigned, and paved walkways, picnic tables, drinking fountains, and staircase railings were added. Further alterations over the years resulted in the removal of other NYA elements, including the spring enclosure, another guard rail, and several fireplaces. Although many of Minnesota's New Deal-era waysides are listed on the National Register in the own right—including the nearby Stillwater Overlook—the Boom Site was deemed ineligible because the changes over the years had too greatly compromised its historic integrity.

During the onset of the Great Recession in 2008, MnDOT closed 86 waysides around the state under the justification that they no longer served a transportation safety function. Two organizations, the Friends of Washington County and the Friends of the St. Croix Boom Site, led a successful campaign to reopen the site. In 2010 MnDOT transferred management of the property to the Minnesota Department of Natural Resources. In 2014 the two Friends organizations helped gather public input on proposed improvements to the site. Possible additions included an information kiosk, picnic shelters, and an enclosure for the portable toilets, all styled after the Boom Site's logging-era structures.

== Description ==
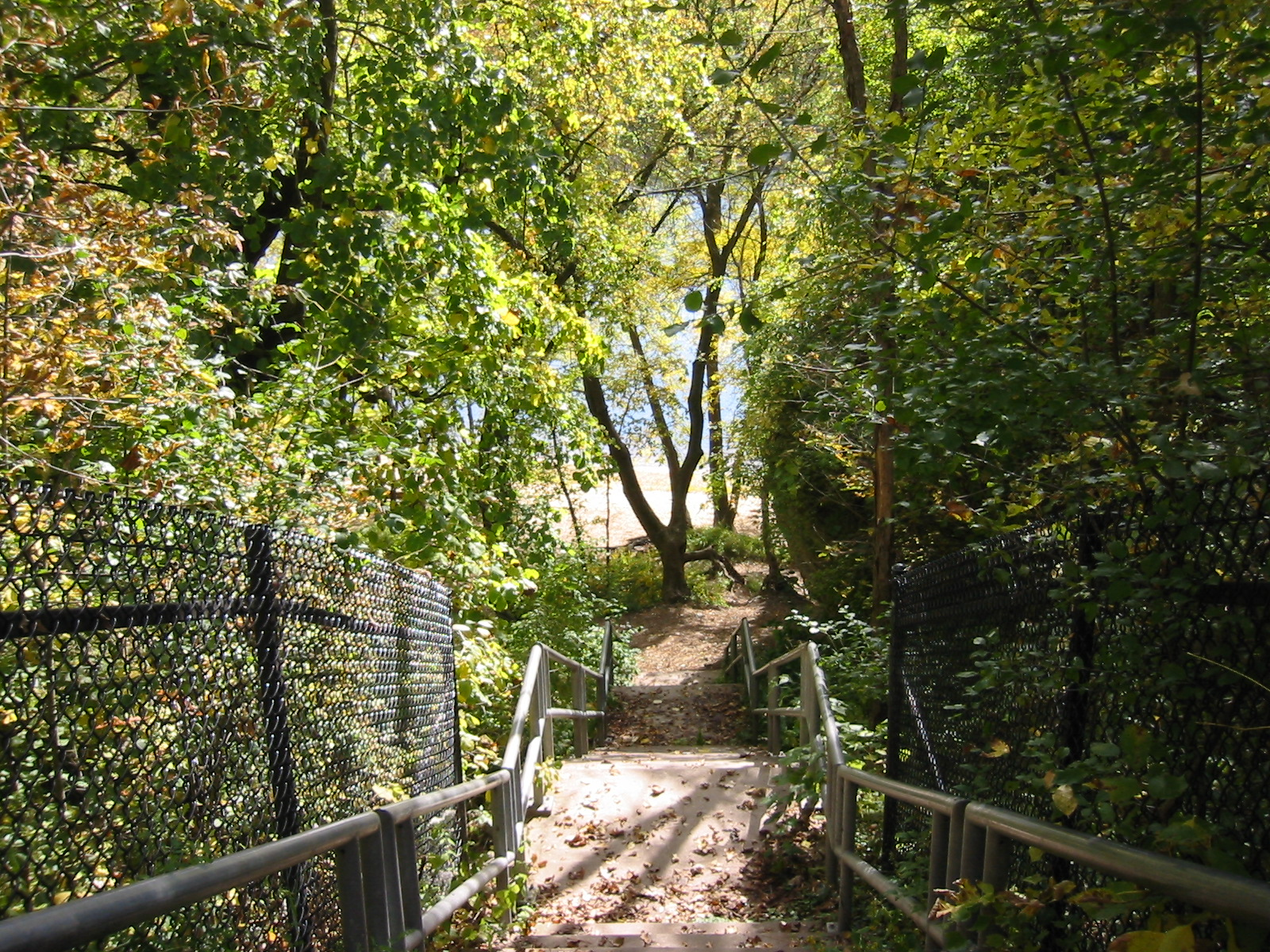
The staircase leading to the riverbank

In the present day the St. Croix Boom Site is a 26-acre (11 ha) park with five distinct areas. At the northern end is a large parking and picnic area, signposted as the "wayside". A few hundred yards to the south, but separated by a gully, is a smaller parking area with the historical marker and a staircase down to the riverbank. .25 miles (0.40 km) south is a scenic overlook, which provides the clearest view of the river for motorists. The overlook abuts the private Boomsite Marina, but a short distance downstream is a separate public boat launch.

Traces of log boom operation are scant, as most of the structures were removed when the business closed in 1914. The historical marker is located near the site of the mess hall. A shallow cave near the base of the river stairs was used as a natural root cellar. The cook shanty stood on the blufftop directly above, and a dumbwaiter was rigged through a hole cut in the cave roof to deliver food directly from its storage area. The scenic overlook rises above the point where the main log boom was chained across the river. Across the highway from the wayside parking area is a private home that was once the St. Croix Boom Company House and Barn, built circa 1885 as the residence of the on-site superintendent. It was long assumed that no other structures remained from the log boom era, but in 1975 a historical survey crew from the National Park Service rediscovered two buildings hidden by forest. One was identified as a crew office that also functioned as a winter warming hut.

== See also ==
- List of industrial heritage sites
- List of National Historic Landmarks in Minnesota
- National Register of Historic Places listings in Washington County, Minnesota
