= Pest House (Stillwater, Minnesota) =

- U.S. National Register of Historic Places
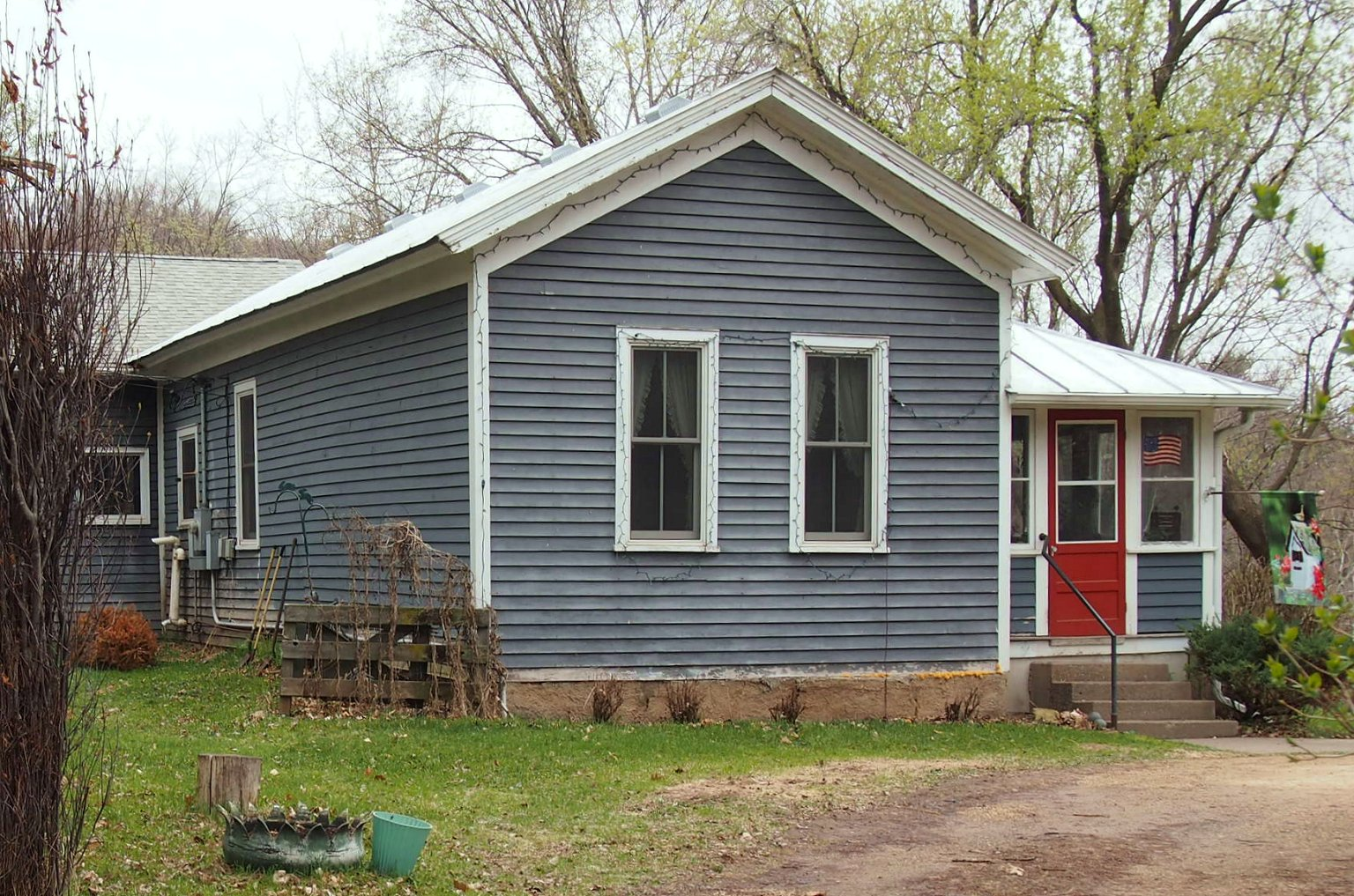
- The Pest House with later additions at right and rear

- Location within Minnesota Location within the United States
- Location: 9033 Fairy Falls Road; Stillwater Township, Minnesota
- Coordinates: 45°4′47.7″N 92°48′20.3″W
- Area: Less than one acre
- Built: c. 1872
- MPS: Washington County MRA (AD)
- NRHP reference No.: 80000408
- Added to NRHP: June 17, 1980

The Pest House in Stillwater Township, Minnesota, United States, is a former quarantine facility used by the city of Stillwater circa 1872 to 1910. It is a rare surviving example of a pest house, a common public health strategy of the late 19th and early 20th centuries, where people with contagious diseases were isolated. It was listed on the National Register of Historic Places in 1980 for having local significance in the theme of health/medicine. The original three-room Pest House has been converted into a private residence, with the addition of a porch on the southeast and a rear wing to the northwest.

== History ==
In 1871 the Stillwater city council appointed a local board of health. One of its tasks was to prevent epidemics by isolating visitors or residents found to have contagious diseases. Thus the following year the city purchased a property on a hill outside town, on which was built the Pest House. It primarily served to isolate victims of smallpox, but also saw cases of scarlet fever, typhoid, and diphtheria. Stillwater ceased use of the Pest House in 1910, as hospitals were assuming the role of treating contagious diseases. The building was later converted into a private residence.

== See also ==
- National Register of Historic Places listings in Washington County, Minnesota
