= Sheldon Boright House =

Historic house in Vermont, United States

- U.S. National Register of Historic Places
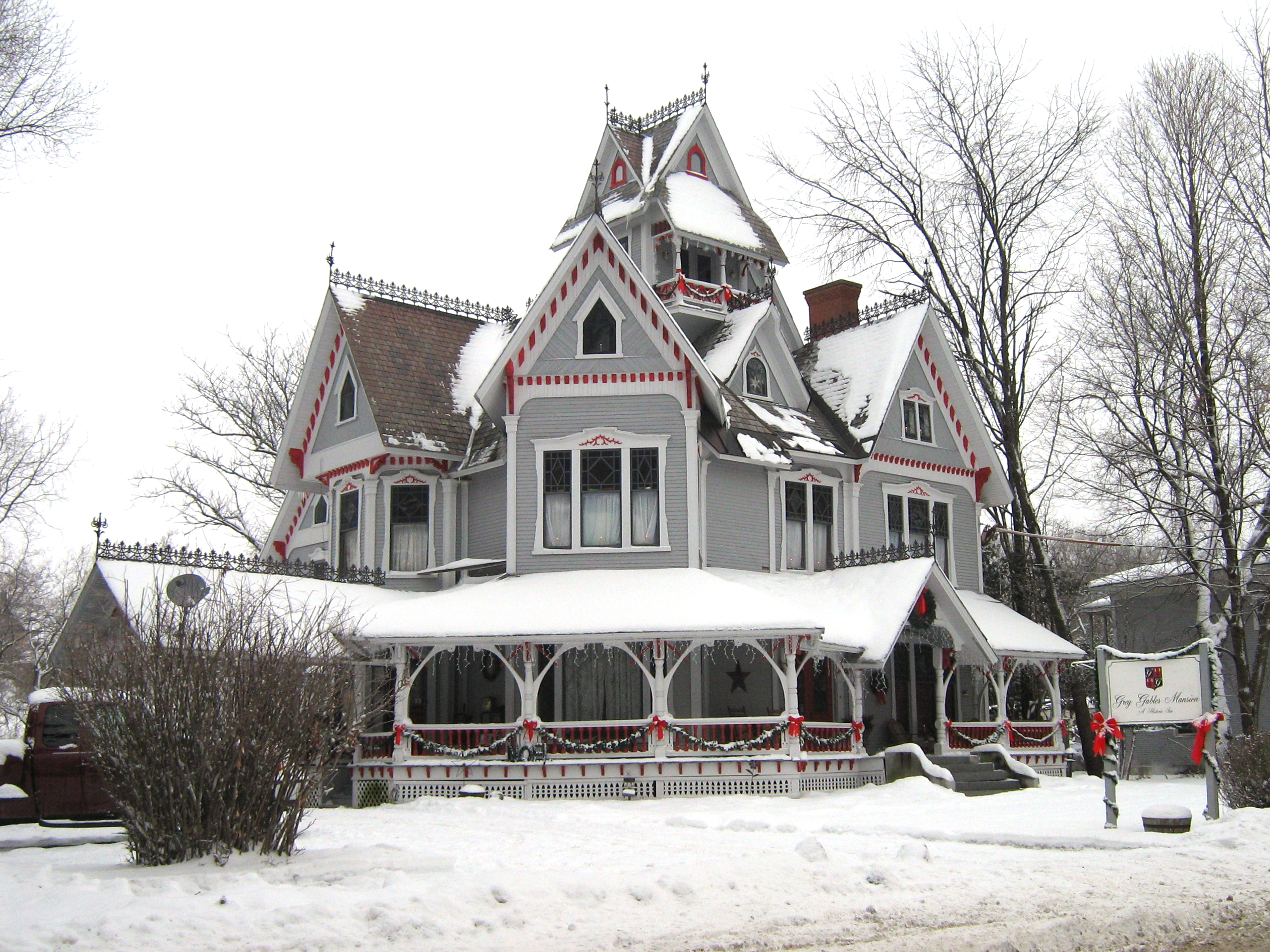

- Location within Vermont Location within the United States
- Location: 122 River St., Richford, Vermont
- Coordinates: 44°59′53″N 72°40′31″W
- Area: 1.2 acres (0.49 ha)
- Built: 1890
- Built by: Dode, M.E.
- Architect: Palliser's American Cottage Homes
- Architectural style: Stick/eastlake, Queen Anne
- NRHP reference No.: 89000433
- Added to NRHP: June 2, 1989

The Sheldon Boright House, also known as the Grey Gables, is a historic house at 122 River Street in Richford, Vermont. Built in 1890 for a prominent local businessman, it is a fine example of a pattern-book design by Palliser, Palliser & Company, and may be the only instance of a house found on the cover of one of that company's pattern books. Now a bed and breakfast inn, it was listed on the National Register of Historic Places in 1989.

== Description and history ==
The Sheldon Boright House stands on the west side of Richford's town center, overlooking the Missisquoi River from the north side of River Street. It is a distinctive 2 1/2-story wood-frame structure with elaborate Queen Anne styling. Its asymmetrical massing is covered by a multicolored slate roof that features iron cresting and numerous gables. A central tower rises to a third story, covered by a cross-gabled roof. The walls are finished mainly in clapboards, with pilastered corners and peaked window surrounds. A single-story porch wraps around two sides, with elaborate turned posts, gables and Stick style arched woodwork. The interior retains equally elaborate decorative elements original to its period of construction.

The house is the largest and most elaborately decorated in the small community. It was built about 1892 for Sheldon Boright, a Canadian immigrant who was a prominent local businessman. The house is based on a pattern published by Palliser & Palliser of Bridgeport, Connecticut in its 1878 Palliser's American Cottage Homes. It was apparently also the design for George Palliser's own home in Bridgeport, which no longer stands, and appears on the cover of the book. It is one of the only known examples of a Palliser house in Vermont, and it may be the only one that is a close copy of one of the Palliser's own homes. It was built by M.E. Dode, who successfully adapted local materials (including polychrome slate for the roof) to the design.

== See also ==
- National Register of Historic Places listings in Franklin County, Vermont
