= Henry Stussi House =

Historic house in Minnesota, United States

- U.S. National Register of Historic Places
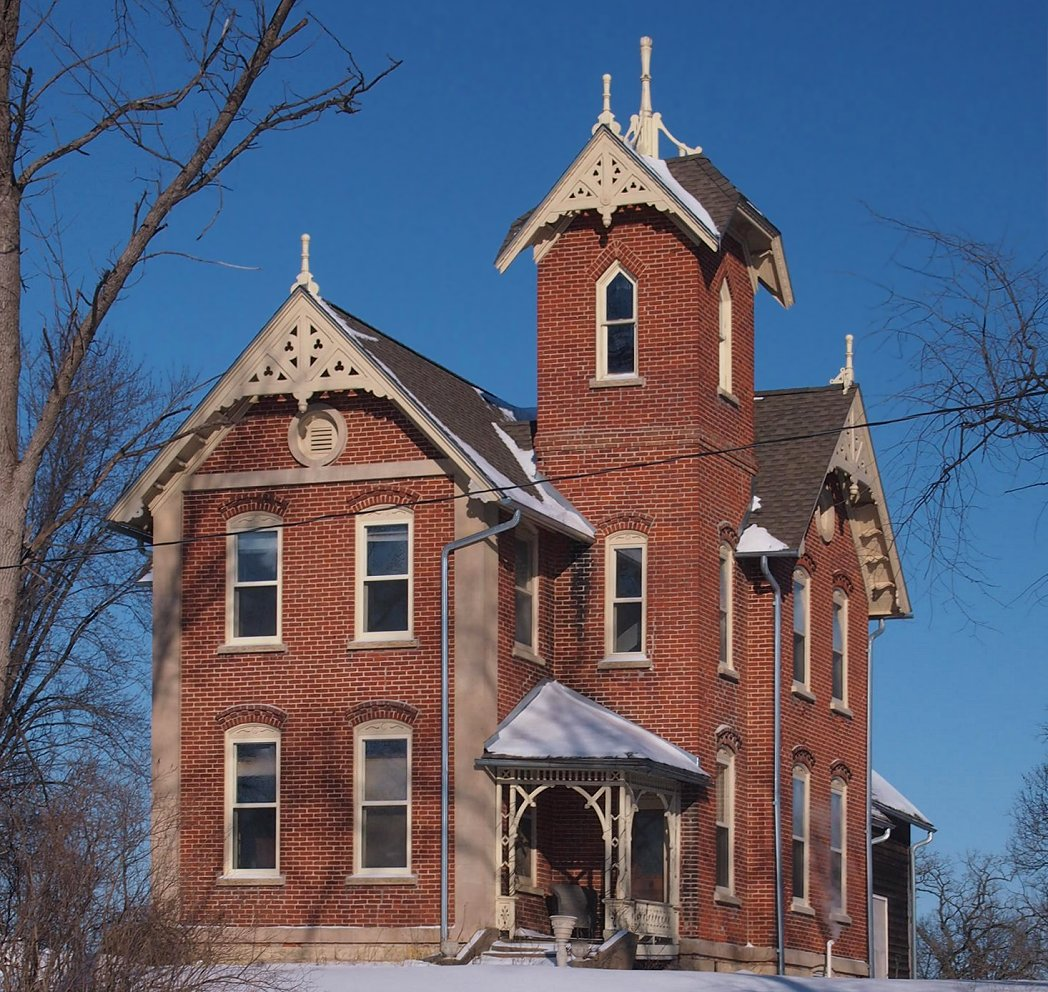
- The Henry Stussi House from the southeast

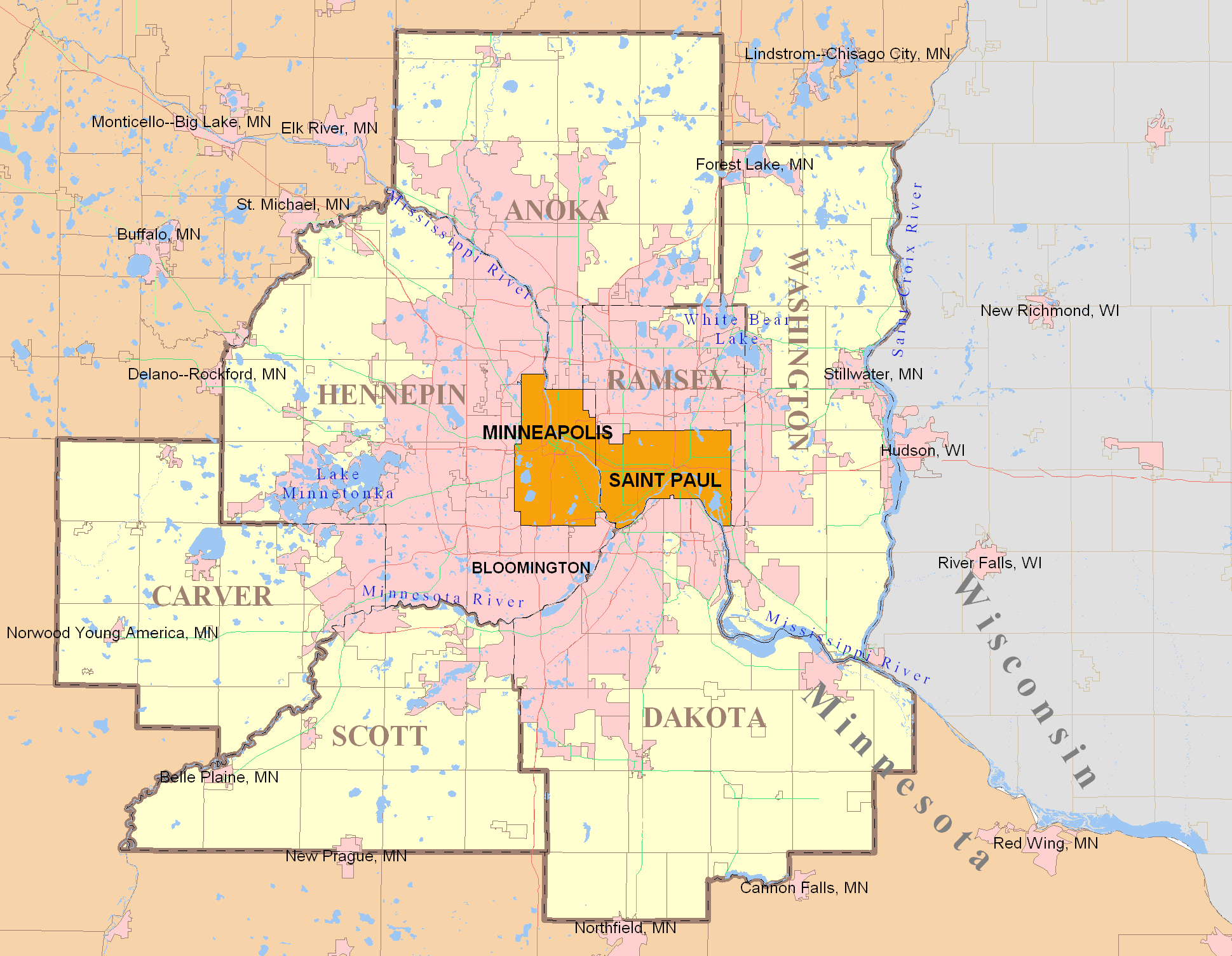
- Location within Minneapolis–Saint Paul Location within Minnesota Location within the United States
- Location: 9097 Mendel Road, Stillwater Township, Minnesota
- Coordinates: 45°4′50.2″N 92°50′45.2″W
- Built: Late 1870s
- Architectural style: Gothic Revival
- NRHP reference No.: 82003082
- Added to NRHP: April 20, 1982

The Henry Stussi House is a historic Gothic Revival house in Stillwater Township, Minnesota, United States, dating to the late 1870s. It was listed on the National Register of Historic Places in 1982 for its local significance in the themes of architecture and commerce. It was nominated for being one of Washington County's finest rural houses, and for its association with a notable figure in the local milling industry and ice trade.

== Description ==
The Henry Stussi House is a two-story brick building with a three-story tower. It is cruciform in shape. The main section and the tower both have gable roofs embellished with decorative wooden pendants and finials. The front façade has stone pilasters at both corners. The house is adapted from a design in a Palliser, Palliser & Company pattern book.

== History ==
Henry Stussi moved to Stillwater, Minnesota, in 1871, where he purchased and upgraded a mill that produced both flour and animal feed. In the late 1870s he had this home built outside of Stillwater overlooking Twin Lakes, where he engaged in farming and ice cutting.

== See also ==
- National Register of Historic Places listings in Washington County, Minnesota
