= Minnesota Bluegrass and Old-Time Music Association =

The Minnesota Bluegrass and Old-Time Music Association (MBOTMA) is a non-profit music organization based out of the U.S. state of Minnesota, founded in 1975. Its mission is to preserve and promote Bluegrass music and Old-Time music in and around Minnesota. The organization presents four annual festivals: Winter Bluegrass Weekend, Homegrown Kickoff, Minnesota Bluegrass & Old-Time Music Festival (August Fest), and Fall Jam.

Additionally MBOTMA organizes the Minnesota Bluegrass Community Concert Series, the Lonely Pines Concert Series, various jam sessions, educational workshops and school programs, and publishes a monthly magazine-style newsletter called Inside Bluegrass.

== Organizational history ==
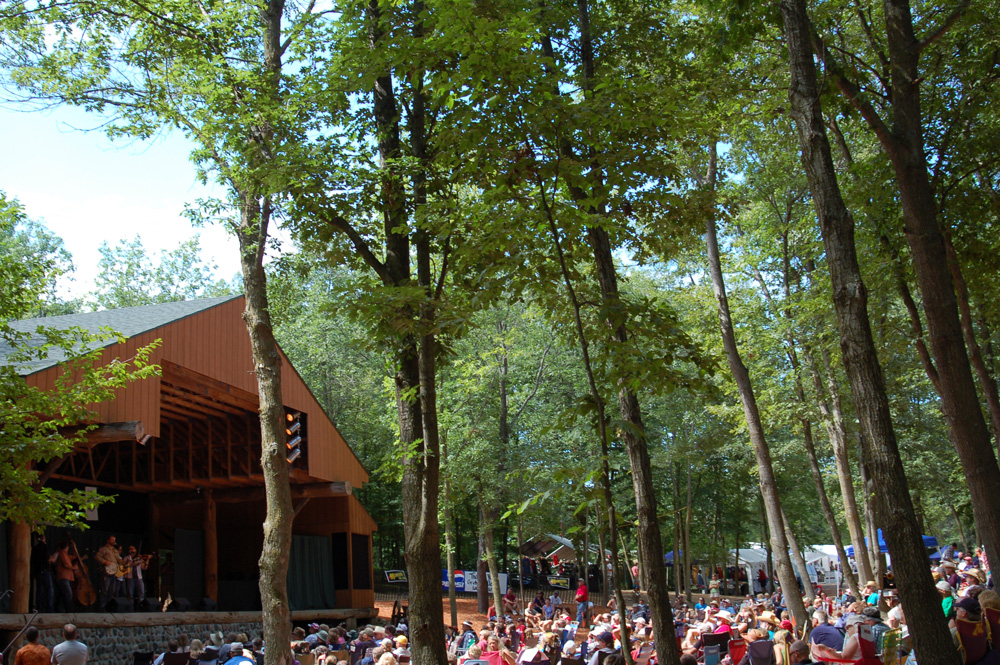
Mountain Heart performs at the 2008 Minnesota Bluegrass & Old-Time Music Festival.

MBOTMA was started in September 1975 by Minnesota bass player Tom O'Neill. He circulated a proposal to people that he knew were interested in bluegrass and old-time music, and sent out a preliminary newsletter announcing the Minnesota Bluegrass and Old-Time Music Association (MBOTMA), based on the San Diego Bluegrass Club and its newsletter format. MBOTMA sent its first official newsletter to a membership of 40 people in October of the same year.

The Association's membership grew steadily and, in August 1976, MBOTMA was incorporated as a non-profit corporation in Minnesota. During the first three years membership grew to over 400.

The organization introduced its first three-day summer bluegrass festival at Wildwood Campground in Taylors Falls, Minnesota, in August 1980. Later this event became the Minnesota Bluegrass & Old-Time Music Festival, located at El Rancho Mañana in central Minnesota. 1980 was also the year that MBOTMA held the first Buy, Sell, Swap Meet, which developed into the Winter Bluegrass Weekend: A Festival of Bluegrass & Old-Time Music & Dance, held annually the first weekend in March at the Crowne Plaza Hotel & Conference Center in Plymouth, Minnesota (formerly known as the Radisson Hotel & Conference Center).

In 1988, the summer MBOTMA Festival moved to Camp in the Woods Resort near Zimmerman, Minnesota, where volunteers constructed a permanent stage facility. The Minnesota Homegrown Kickoff Music Festival was started in June 1993 at the same venue. Both festivals flourished, but in 2001, Camp In The Woods was sold to a housing developer, and a larger location with a long-range future was sought.

In 2002, the two festivals moved to El Rancho Mañana, a campground and riding stables west of St. Cloud, Minnesota. Volunteers designed and contributed much of the labor to build the concert area and stage, and it is now considered one of the Midwest's most beautiful outdoor festival grounds.

In 2001, MBOTMA hired its first professional executive director, Jed Malischke, to better serve its membership and mission. The organization now has a steady membership of approximately 1000 individuals and 125 member bands.

Two winter concert programs are well established: the Community Concert Series brings MBOTMA member bands to venues in small communities throughout Minnesota, and the Lonely Pines Concert Series features professional touring bands in a series of concerts in large and small cities.

Since 2003, the organization has partnered with the Minnesota State Fair to present the Minnesota Flatpicking Guitar & Duet Championships. A fourth annual festival, the Harvest Jamboree, was launched in 2006, It is an indoor multi-day festival with concerts, workshops and jamming. MBOTMA also hosts various jam sessions, sponsors children’s educational programs, and helps support events sponsored by other organizations and its member bands.

MBOMTA’s monthly publication, Inside Bluegrass, has twice been voted “Best Newsletter” by the Society for the Preservation of Bluegrass Music in America (SPBGMA). The Minnesota Bluegrass & Old-Time Music Festival was nominated in the "Event of the Year" category by the International Bluegrass Music Association (IBMA) in 2005 and 2007.1

Until 2020, MBOTMA had an additional festival held in the early Spring, the Cabin Fever Festival. This was a long running festival in Duluth, and ended after their last show in 2019.

At the organization's main and self titled event in Richmond, Minnesota Bluegrass and Old Time Music Festival (August Fest), they host a three day jam camp leading up to the festival, where people come to jam with other people, and learn about jamming and their instrument. Some of the main attractions of August fest are the touring headline bands, local bands, family areas with activities for kids, jam sessions all throughout the campground all day and night.

The Winter Bluegrass Weekend is usually held in early March and is at the Crowne Plaza in Plymouth, Minnesota. During the festival, they have a youth camp called "Grass Seeds" and is for kids from roughly 6-18 years old. Grass Seeds contains workshops, jamming, instrument lessons, band etiquette, and more. Different musical artist and bands host this camp, but it is often hosted by the High 48s band. The Winter Bluegrass Weekend also contains jamming, musician workshops, raffles, and more.
