= School Section Lake =

Lake in the state of Minnesota, United States

- Location within Minnesota
- Location: Washington County, Minnesota
- Coordinates: 45°8′22″N 92°54′17″W
- Type: lake

School Section Lake is a lake in Washington County, in the U.S. state of Minnesota.

School Section Lake was so named from its location in school section 36.
