= History of the Irish in Saint Paul =

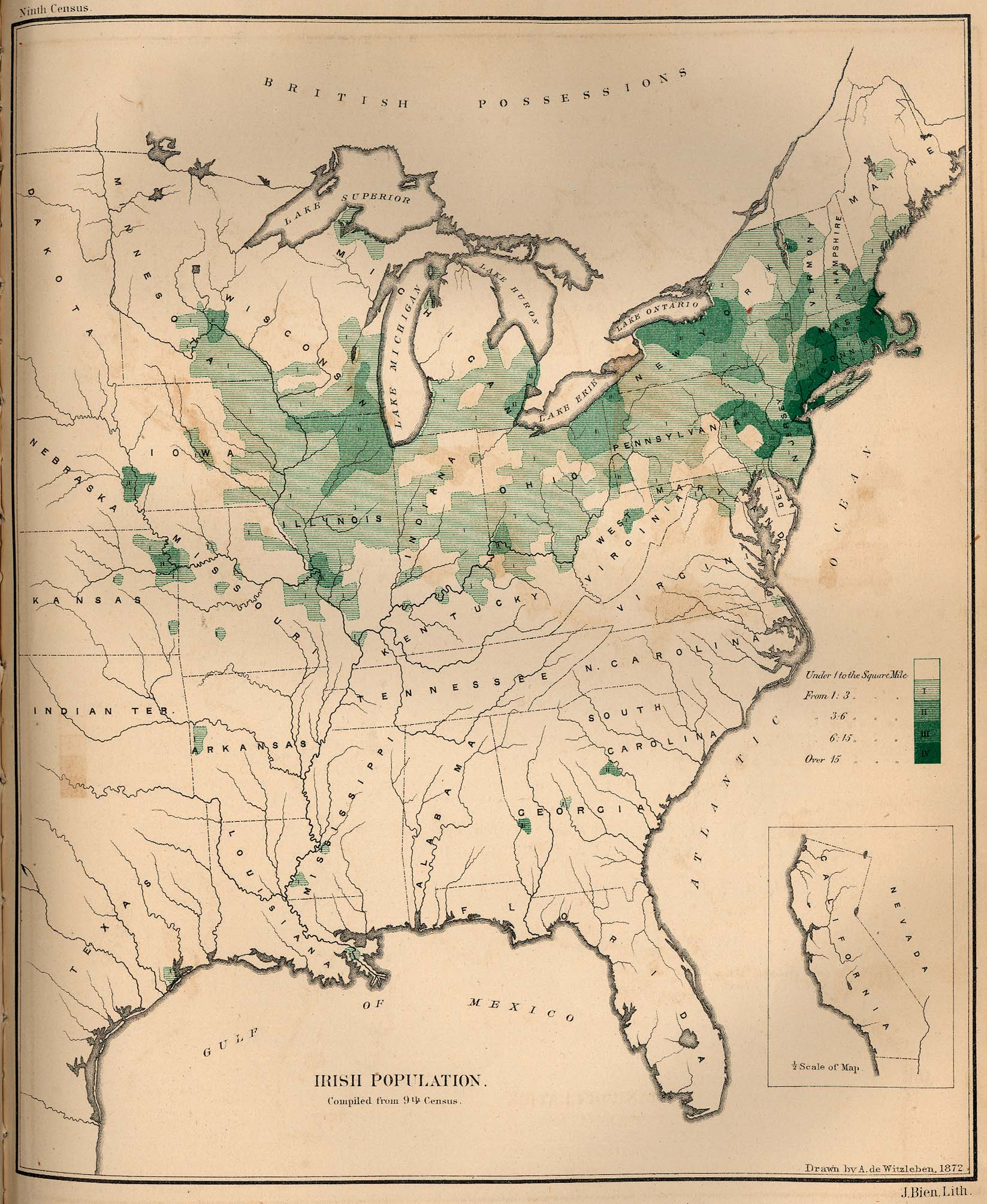
Note the relatively large density of Irish around Saint Paul.

Irish in Saint Paul, Minnesota have played an integral part in the founding and the growth of the city. The first Irish to settle in Saint Paul were three demobilised soldiers from Fort Snelling who were natives of Ireland. They became the first settlers in the area of downtown Saint Paul. Helped by Archbishop John Ireland, thousands of Irish emigrated from Ireland and Eastern cities in the United States to Minnesota; and especially large number settled in Saint Paul.

Despite being outnumbered by the German American community, the Irish, like in other American big cities, led the Democratic Party political machine that ran St. Paul. Many mayors of Saint Paul have been Irish, including a stretch of nine out of ten from 1932 to 1972. The dominance has been attributed to the control of the business, labor unions, and politics of the city.

== History ==
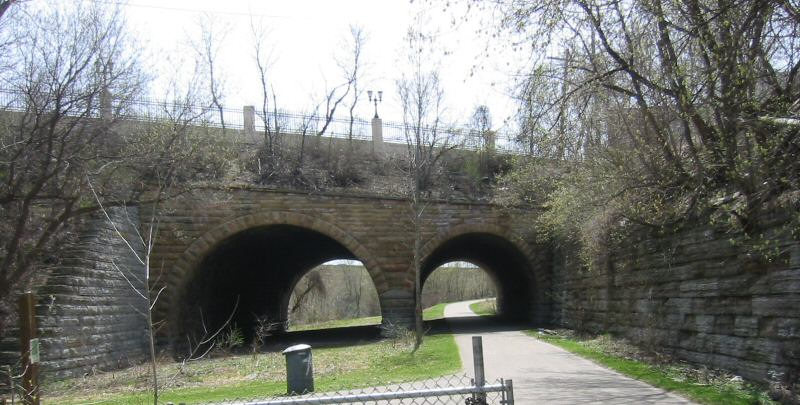
The Seventh Street Improvement Arches separated Swede Hollow from Connemara Patch. The north side (foreground) of the photograph is Swede Hollow; the area partially visible beyond the arches is the former site of Connemara Patch.

The first Irish to come in Minnesota were immigrants who served as soldiers at nearby Fort Snelling. These soldiers would later be some of Saint Paul's first settlers. In July 1838, three soldiers filed claims for land in what is now Saint Paul. Edward Phelan, John Hays and William Evans were all natives of Ireland and had been discharged from Fort Snelling. Evans settled on Dayton's Bluff, with Phelan and Hays becoming the first people to live on what is now Downtown Saint Paul. Hays later became the first person to be murdered in Saint Paul, dying in September 1839. Phelan was accused but was then released due to lack of evidence. He settled near the creek that runs through the East Side neighborhood, later named Phalen Creek. The creek runs from Lake Phalen through Swede Hollow to the Mississippi River and was later used by Hamm's Brewery. In 1850 after he was accused of perjury, Phelan fled to California.

A number of strong fraternal organizations had chapters in Saint Paul including the Benevolent Society of Erin and Shields Guards, a militia named for James Shields. Saint Paul's branch of the Fenian Brotherhood even led the Pembina Raid in conjunction with other attacks of the Fenian Raids.

One of the most direct connections to Ireland that still exists is Connemara Patch. In 1880, Archbishop Ireland attempted to settle the area around Graceville, Minnesota with Irish emigrants from Connemara, County Galway. The colony failed after one of the harshest winters on record. The immigrants spoke only the Irish language and established Connemara Patch, a community just downstream from Swede Hollow. Ireland managed to find jobs for most of Connemaras with the railroads.

In 1850 more than half of the Irish were unskilled laborers. A large portion of the Saint Paul Police Department have been Irish since the 1850s. The Irish in Saint Paul, like those in the Eastern United States participated heavily in politics. Many sought government jobs such as policemen, due to the job security. As a result, the Irish's particularly visible role prompted complaints and allegations from other ethnic groups such as the Germans who wanted more representation.

== Politics ==
Nine of the ten men who served as mayors of Saint Paul between 1932 and 1972 were Irish. Domination of the Democratic Party dates back to 1850s. Around the turn of the 20th century, Irish politicians allied themselves with businessmen and controlled city politics. A study in 1957 concluded that being Catholic was "almost essential for political success in Saint Paul". Led by the influential Archbishop John Ireland, the Catholic Church was heavily influenced by the Irish. Other ethnic groups complained of Irish Catholic ways being imposed on their parishes.

The O'Connor System was created by the Chief of Police, John J. O'Connor and his brother Richard. The system allowed known criminals to live in the city as long as they obeyed the law in Saint Paul. As a result, criminals such as Machine Gun Kelly, John Dillinger and Baby Face Nelson lived in Saint Paul. After the O'Connor brothers retired from politics and a series of high-profile kidnappings occurred, the system fell apart.

== Population ==
The city had a sizable Irish population working as household servants and dock laborers in 1851. In the 1857 census only 17% of Saint Paul's 9,973 residents were born in the United States. The largest foreign-born group were the Germans, with the Irish being the next largest. Immigration from Ireland peaked in 1890. In 1880, Irish immigrants made up 10% of Saint Paul's work force; 10 years later they made up 6%. In 1895, Irish-born residents made up between three and five percent of Saint Paul residents.

== Culture ==
=== Irish Fair of Minnesota ===
The grounds of Harriet Island in St. Paul, is the location for the annual Irish culture festival, known as the Irish Fair of Minnesota. It is held in August of every year. Visitors can choose from the many activities the festival has to offer, like listening to music on one of the three stages, having a bit of Irish food and drink, learning about the many engaging aspects of Irish culture, taking part in a workshop on how to play the Irish bodhran, watching the incredible Irish dancers, and perusing through the Irish marketplace.

=== Saint Patrick's Day ===
Saint Paul held Minnesota's first St Patrick's Day parade in 1851. The celebration was an impromptu event, with 300 participants partaking in flag-raising, speeches and a fired salute. When the parades first started, temperance was an integral theme. The Irish Catholic Temperance Society led many of the first parades, and in 1856 the Benevolent Society of Erin hosted a dinner complete with toasts of cold water. Festivities grew more elaborate during the Civil War. The celebration reached a zenith in 1901, when the city's chapter of the Ancient Order of Hibernians arranged special railroad rates in conjunction with James J. Hill, and as a result 4,000 people took part in the parade. The following year no activities took place, with the Irish celebrating "very quietly and religiously". Archbishop Ireland called to a halt celebrations that had turned into what he termed "midnight orgies". Around a half of a century later, the parade was revived by downtown businessmen in 1967. The parade has since grown to be an organized affair with 100,000 attending the downtown parade in 2007. In addition to a parade, the Irish Music and Dance Association hosts dancing, live music, and vendors in the nearby Landmark Center.

== Notables ==
- Archbishop John Ireland
- James J. Hill
- F. Scott Fitzgerald
- Danny Hogan
- Randy Kelly
- Chris Coleman
- Éamon a Búrc
