= Irish folklore =

Folk culture of Ireland

Irish folklore (Irish: béaloideas) refers to the folktales, balladry, music, dance and mythology of Ireland. It is the study and appreciation of how people lived. The stories are usually told to explain the unexplainable.

The folklore of Ireland includes banshees, fairies, leprechauns and other mythological creatures, and was typically shared orally by people among small communities. Many tales and legends were passed down from generation to generation, so were the dances and song in the observing of important occasions such as weddings, wakes, holidays, etc.

== Definition ==
What constitutes Irish folklore may be rather fuzzy to those unfamiliar with Irish literature. Diarmuid Ó Giolláin, for one, declared that folklore was elusive to define clearly.

Bo Almqvist (c. 1977) gave an all-encompassing definition that folklore covered "the totality of folk culture, spiritual and material", and included anything mentioned in Seán Ó Súilleabháin's A Handbook of Irish Folklore (1942).

It was not until 1846 that the word "folklore" was coined, by English writer William Thoms, to designate "the manners, customs, observances, superstitions, ballads, proverbs, & of the olden time". The term was first translated into Irish as béaloideas (lit. 'oral instruction') in 1927.

=== Folktales and songs ===
Tales have been traditionally recounted at social gatherings, typically by fireside, (Note: Such actual gatherings being reconstructed in Patrick Kennedy's works.) in which traditional Irish music and dance are performed. These gatherings are labeled as the cèilidh, though this is a term borrowed from Scottish Gaelic. The story-telling, songs and dance were a commemoration of special occasions, such as Christmas, Halloween (Oíche Shamhna, eve of Samhain), Bealtaine, held on the first day of May, or St. Patrick's Day. Irish folklore is closely tied with the pipe and fiddle, the traditional Irish music and folk dance.

The keening Caoineadh Airt Uí Laoghaire composed by Eileen Dubh Ní Chonaill in her husband's wake is a piece of poetry passed down by folk tradition.

Other than folktales and legends, the folkloristic genres is complemented by memorates, beliefs, and belief statements.

=== Handcraft and herb lore ===
Also part of Irish folklore are the handed-down skills, such as basket-weaving or making Brigid's crosses.

As an example, shallow wicker baskets called skeeoges as strainers (to empty the boiled potatoes and hot water on, to drain the liquid) were recorded in the Co. Wexford area by Patrick Kennedy in the 19th century. A later folklore collector was unable to ascertain whether this practice was carried out in the locality during the field work in the 1950s (or in the revisit in 1970's). (Note: James G. Delaney was a folklore collector for the Irish Folklore Commission.) This basket's name skeeoge supposedly derived from the Gaelic word for "shield" (Irish: sciath).

The Irish Folklore Commission has accumulated a collection of crosses made on St. Bridget's Day (1 February), and various craft objects made of plaited straw, etc., gathered from across the county.

Folklore can also include knowledge and skills such as how to build a house, or to treat an illness, i.e., herb lore.

== Common themes ==
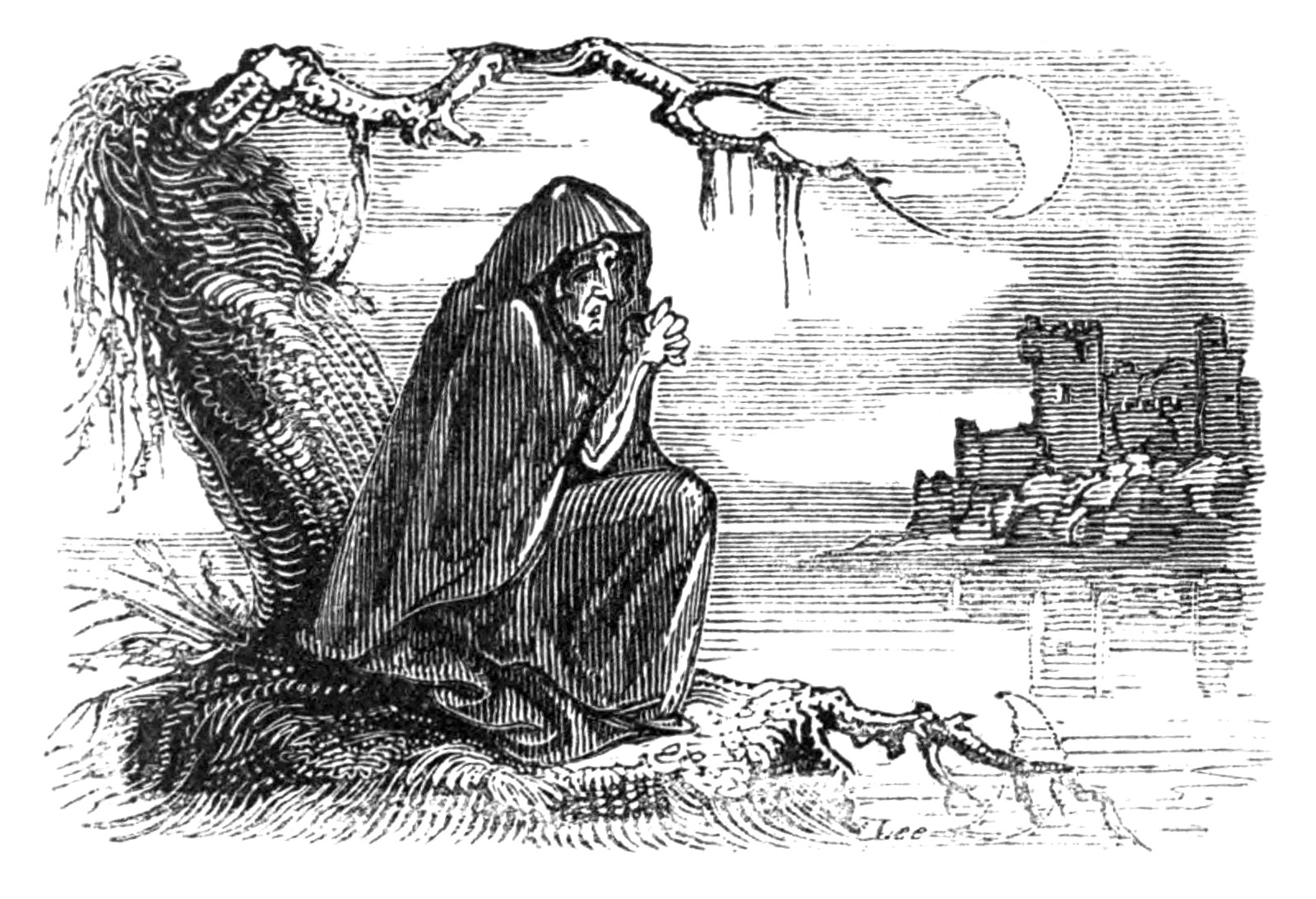
Bunworth Banshee, Fairy Legends and Traditions of the South of Ireland by Thomas Crofton Croker, 1825

There are certain stock motifs, often stereotypes, in Irish folklore.

=== Fairies ===
One commentator attributes to Andrew Lang the sweeping definition that Irish folklore is all about fairies. The belief in fairies (an lucht sidhe) has been widespread.

Some, such as Irish poet W. B. Yeats, have divided the fairies into multiple categories and/or species (see Classifications of fairies). However, Irish fairies are typically divided into two main categories: the fairy race and the solitary fairies.

The race of fairy people (Aos Sí) were thought to be descendants of the Tuatha Dé Danann, a godlike race who came to Ireland and conquered the people there. They are described as human sized, beautiful, powerful, and in tune with nature, similar to the modern day fantasy race of Elves.

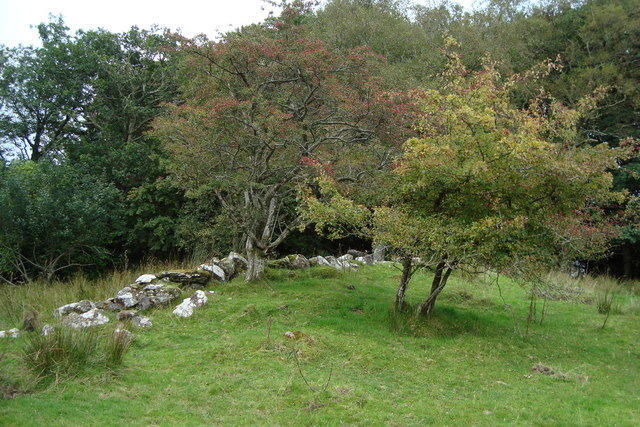
Fairy Trees near Greenan. According to fairy lore, the hawthorn tree, also known as a fairy tree, is said to mark the territory of the fairies.

Instead of living together like the elite fairy race, solitary fairies are secretive and isolated, often staying away from humans and coming out at night. The solitary fairies include a wide range of magical creatures in Irish folklore.

One type of Irish fairy is the female banshee, the death-messenger with her keening, or baleful crying over someone's death, and known by many different names. (Note: For example badhbh (meaning 'scaldcrow') us commonly used in the south-east of Ireland, though the crow represents the war-goddess Badb (conflated with Mór-Ríoghain) in early Irish literature.)

Another well-recognized Irish fairy is the leprechaun, which many have identified as the maker of shoes. (Note: The notion is based on Douglas Hydes's etymology of leprechaun, derived from leith brog or leith brogan 'one-shoemaker', however, others point out the word can be traced to Old Irish luchorpán meaning some sort of a dwarf(-like being). But not only Yeats but Bo Almqvist refers to the leprechaun as "fairy shoemaker".) (Note: Diarmuid Ó Giolláin (1984 paper, etc.) is prominent in the study of Leprechauns.) The cluricaune is a sprite many treat as synonymous to the leprechaun, (Note: T. Crofton Croker (1824), Researches and Thomas Keightley (1860) [1828] The Fairy Mythology, pp. 371–383, cited by Ó Giolláin (1984).) (Note: Croker's "The Field of Boliauns" featured the cluricaune, but when Joseph Jacobs included the tale he altered the spirit to the leprechaun.) and Yeats muses on whether these and the far darrig (fear dearg, "red man") are the one and the same. Mackillop says these three are the three kinds solitary fairies, but Yeats goes on to say "there are other solitary fairies", naming the Dullahan (headless horsemen), Púca, and so forth.

The changeling is often ascribed to being perpetrated by fairies. The theme is assigned its own migratory legend type, "The Changeling" (ML 5085).

=== Fairy land ===
Fairies are also connected with the Irish traditional belief in the Otherworld (An Saol Eile).

Fairy forts and hawthorn trees, also known as fairy trees, are places where fairies are thought to reside. Thus, to tamper with these sites is seen as hugely disrespectful to the fairies.

==== Hawthorn tree ====
There are several trees sacred to Ireland, but the lone hawthorn (aka the "may" tree) is particularly considered a fairy haunt, and patches underneath where the grass have worn down are reputed to be due to fairies dancing. (Note: Though George Henry Kinahan, a naturalist and archaeologist, reckons they are just as well caused by wayfarers taking refuge.) Though literary fiction more than folklore, two consecutive poems by Samuel Ferguson, "The Fairy Thorn" and "The Fairy Well of Lagnanay" describes the lone Fairy Hawthorn (The Whitethorn). (Note: In the first poem, a fairy abduction takes place, and in the second, a girl fades away after wishing to be taken to Fairy land, and drinking from the well.)

==== Fairy mounds ====
The notion that Irish fairies live in fairy mounds (fairy forts, fairy hills) give rise to the names aos sí or daoine sídhe ('people of the sidhe [fairy mound]').

In the instance of "The Legend of Knockgrafton" (name of a hill), the protagonist named Lusmore is carried inside the fairy "moat" or rath by the fairy wind (Irish: sidhe gaoithe). (Note: Or fairy blast.)

=== Heroic sagas ===
Other classic themes in Irish folktale literature include Cú Chulainn, Children of Lir, Fionn Mac Cumhail, from medieval heroic and tragic sagas.

Folklore material in the 'Pre-Croker period', according to Bo Almqvist's reckoning, do tentatively include various Medieval written texts (the heroic tales in the Ulster Cycle, Finn Cycle, the Cycle of the Kings, and the hagiography of St. Patrick and other saints, etc.), with the proviso that these works can no longer be considered intact folk legends, given the accrued literary layers of the "fanciful and fantastic". However they are an excellent well-source of comparative study, as collected folktales are sometimes traceable to these medieval sagas. An example is the tale of Cú Chulainn's horse (Note: The lore of Cú Chulainn's horse, the Grey of Macha, or perhaps the underlying story of the woman Macha in the narrative The Debility of the Ulstermen.) remnant in the legend type of "The Waterhorse as Workhorse" (MLSIT 4086), (Note: Migratory Legend Suggested Irish Type index of Bo Almqvist.) or so argued by C. W. von Sydow.

In the 20th century, the Irish Folklore Commission collected a large corpus of such romantic heroic sagas, particularly the stories of Fionn Mac Cumhail and the Fianna. (Note: The collection of such folktales was encouraged by the fact that Seán Ó Súilleabháin included summaries of Ulster cycle and Fenian tales in his 1942 Handbook, which was the field manual for collectors of the commission, and beyond.)

== History of collecting ==
=== Early collectors ===
For most of the 19th century, collection of Irish folklore was undertaken by English-speakers, and the material collected were recorded only in English.

Thomas Crofton Croker who compiled Fairy Legends and Traditions of the South of Ireland (1825–28) is considered one of the earliest collectors. Croker is the first among the significant "antiquary-folklorists" (the label applied by Richard Dorson) to emerge from mere antiquarians.

=== Tales in the Irish language ===
The Irish-speaking West, the Gaeltacht included for example the Aran Islands, where some folklore-collecting was performed by Danish linguist Holger Pedersen back in 1896, though the resulting collection was never published until a century later. The playwright J. M. Synge also included a couple of folktales in his The Aran Islands (1907).

=== Irish Folklore Commission ===
Séamus Ó Duilearga (James Hamilton Delargy), who founded the Folklore of Ireland Society and its Béaloideas magazine in 1927, was later appointed to head the Irish Folklore Commission (IFC) in established by the Irish government in 1935. Seán Ó Súilleabháin was the archivist for the IFC since its inception. After having undergone 3 month tutelage in Uppsala, Sweden under C. W. von Sydow on the methods of folklore archiving, the archivist became instrumental in establishing collecting policies for the IFC. One of Ó Súilleabháin's projects was the Schools' Scheme for primary school children to collect folklore (1937-1938). IFC established a network of 200 or 300 correspondents all over Ireland to whom long questionnaires were sent out to task them with particular areas of folklore collecting.

Ó Súilleabháin soon compiled a how-to guidebook for folklore-collecting fieldwork, entitled Láimh-Leabhar Béaloideasa (1937) in Irish, later expanded and published in English as A Handbook of Irish Folklore (1942). The methodology was based on the Uppsala system he studied, and the books became the standard bible for any Irish folklore collector.

=== An Irish Folklore Treasury ===
In the 1930s, Irish schoolchildren were tasked with the asking of older relatives and neighbours about stories and superstitions from times past so that ordinary people's lives could be preserved and celebrated. This collection of stories became the National Folklore Archive's Schools Collection.

In 1935, The National Folklore Commission (NFC) was created by the Irish Government. It contains about 2 million transcript pages, 500,000 index cards, 12,000 hours of sound recording, 80,000 photographs, and 1,000 hours of video material collected from across all 32 counties of Ireland.

John Creedon introduces and contextualizes 14 different stories in "An Irish Folklore Treasury", published by Gill Books in 2023.

=== Folktale classification ===
An effort to catalogue all the known international folk tales in Ireland, either in print or in oral circulation (as of 1956) was mounted by Seán Ó Súilleabháin and Reidar Thoralf Christiansen, culminating in The Types of the Irish Folktale (1963), a compilation of some 43,000 versions under 700 international tales.

Christiansen was the creator of the index of Norwegian migratory legends (ML index), and Bo Almqvist adapted this for Irish legends, calling it MLSIT (for Migratory Legend Suggested Irish Type). Although The Types of the Irish Folktale purportedly deals with folktale but not folk legend, there are found to be some intersections between these comparative study apparatuses.

== Sociological trends ==
Folklore is a part of national identity, and its meaning has evolved through time.

=== Irish identity ===
In Ireland the word folklore has deep meaning to its people and brings societies together, it is a word that has ideological significance in the country. To put it succinctly, folklore is an important part of the national identity.

=== Effects of Christianity on Irish folklore ===
When Christianity was first brought in Ireland during the 5th century by missionaries, they were not able to totally wipe out the pre-existing folklore and beliefs in God-like fairies. But folklore did not remain untouched, and the myths and Christian beliefs were combined such that Irish folklore would "enforce Christian ideals but still remain as a concession to early fairy belief systems". Christianity altered the importance of some beliefs and define a new place for them in folklore. For example, fairies, who were previously perceived as God, became merely magical, and of much lesser importance. Along with it, a fusion of folklore legends and Christianity was witnessed. One of the major example of this is the existence of legends featuring both Saint Patrick, a central figure in the Irish church, and fairies (for example, "The Colloquy of the Ancients" is a dialogue between Saint Patrick and the ghost of Caeilte of the Fianna, an ancient clan of Celtic warriors).

All in all, the current Irish folklore shows a strong absorption of Christianity, including its lesson of morality and spiritual beliefs, creating a "singular brand of fairy tale tradition".

=== English colonization ===
During the 16th century, the English conquest overthrew the traditional political and religious autonomy of the country.

=== Great Famine ===
The Great famine of the 1840s, and the deaths and emigration it brought, weakened a still powerful Gaelic culture, especially within the rural proletariat, which was at the time the most traditional social grouping. At the time, intellectuals such as Sir William Wilde expressed concerns on the decay of traditional beliefs:

In the state of things, with depopulation the most terrific which any country ever experienced, on the one hand, and the spread of education, and the introduction of railroads, colleges, industrial and other educational schools, on the other – together with the rapid decay of our Irish bardic annals, the vestige of Pagan rites, and the relics of fairy charms were preserved, - can superstition, or if superstitious belief, can superstitious practices continue to exist?

=== Modern society ===
Moreover, global migration has helped overcoming special spatial barriers making it easier for cultures to merge into one another (such as the amalgam between Samhain and Halloween).

All those events have led to a massive decline of native learned Gaelic traditions and Irish language, and with Irish tradition being mainly an oral tradition, this has led to a loss of identity and historical continuity, in a similar nature to Durkheim's anomie.

== Folk history ==
Irish folklore is replete with oral traditions that pertain to historical subjects. This was recognised in Seán Ó Súilleabháin's A Handbook of Irish Folklore, which includes a chapter specifically dedicated to collecting "Historical Tradition". Irish folk history was commonly known by the name seanchas, a term defined by Séamus Ó Duilearga as "orally preserved social-historical tradition." When conducting fieldwork in county Fermanagh, the American folklorist Henry Glassie, a pioneer in the study of folk history, observed that in Irish storytelling "history is a topic for conversation". In his prize-winning works on the memory of the Irish Rebellion of 1798, the Israeli historian Guy Beiner has written in-depth case studies of folk history, powerfully demonstrating the value of folklore for the study of social and cultural history. Beiner has advocated for use of the term "vernacular historiography", which he argues "consciously steers clear of the artificial divides between oral and literary cultures that lie at the heart of conceptualizations of oral tradition" and also allows for the inclusion of folklife sources found in ethnological studies of material and visual culture.

== In popular culture ==
Finnish folklorist Lauri Honko has referred to the re-contexted exploitation of folklore as its "second life". Irish folklore material is now being used in marketing (with strategies suggesting tradition and authenticity for goods), movies and TV shows (The Secret of Kells, mention of the Banshee are found in TV shows such as Supernatural, Teen Wolf, Charmed or So Weird), books (the book series The Secrets of the Immortal Nicholas Flamel, the novel American Gods...), contributing to the creation of a new body of Irish folklore.
