= Éamon a Búrc =

Irish storyteller (1866–1942)

Éamon a Búrc (1866–1942) was a tailor, employee of the Great Northern Railway of James J. Hill, and, in his later life, a storyteller or seanchaí from Ireland Connemara Gaeltacht. Seán Ó Súilleabháin, the former chief archivist for the Irish Folklore Commission later called Éamonn a Búrc, "possibly the most accomplished narrator of folktales who has lived into our time." Furthermore, according to Irish-American genealogist and historian Bridget Connelly, the stories from the Fenian Cycle of Irish mythology that were collected from Éamon a Búrc are still taught in University courses alongside Beowulf, the Elder Edda and the Homeric Hymns.

== Life ==
Born to an Irish-speaking family in Carna, County Galway, Ireland. His parents were Liam and Bríde a Búrc. His father, from whom he learned many of his stories, was a native of nearby Ardmore.

The Irish Famine of 1879 caused mass starvation, evictions, and violence in Connemara against the abuses of power by local Anglo-Irish landlords, bailiffs, and the Royal Irish Constabulary. In response, Father Patrick Grealy, the Roman Catholic priest assigned to Carna, selected ten, "very destitute but industrious and virtuous families", from his parish to emigrate to Graceville, Minnesota and be settled upon frontier farm claims in nearby Moonshine Township by Bishop John Ireland of the Roman Catholic Diocese of St. Paul.

On the records of the S.S. Austrian, Éamon a Búrc appears as passenger number 387, "Edmond Bourke", the fourteen year old son of "William Bourke" and his wife Bridget.

At the time, Bishop John Ireland wished to fill up the Minnesota prairie with Irish-American farm families. After the worst blizzard in the State's history, which Laura Ingalls Wilder later fictionalized in her novel The Long Winter, struck on 15 October 1880, the destitute condition of the Connemara homesteaders became an international scandal.

While being interviewed through an interpreter by concerned White Anglo-Saxon Protestant neighbors from nearby Morris, Minnesota, Liam a Búrc said, "There are shingles at my house waiting for a fine day to put them on; I have a cow but no milk; I have in the house fifty pounds of flour and corn meal; the flour I got from Morris people together with some clothing and two pairs of shoes, no use for children in the cradle; I have enough for about a week; did not suffer for wood; got some from Bishop Ireland's woods at Lake Tokua, and one cord from Father Ryan; Father Ryan always treated me well." The Morris newspaper concluded, "This man has four children. Mr. O'Brien left with him one pair men's shoes, one pair women's and two pair children's shoes."

Despite their refusal to criticize him, the a Búrc family was evicted from their claim by the Bishop and resettled in a Saint Paul, Minnesota shantytown which was dubbed the Connemara Patch. Éamon and his father went to work for the Great Northern Railway of James J. Hill. After losing a leg in a work-related accident, Éamon and his family returned to Ireland in 1883. He went to work as a tailor at his home in the township of Aill na Brón, near his native Carna.

During the aftermath of the Irish War of Independence and the Civil War, the Connemara was a major center for the work of the Irish Folklore Commission in recording Ireland's endangered folklore, mythology, and oral literature. According to folklore collector and archivist Seán Ó Súilleabháin, residents with no stories to tell were the exception rather than the rule and it was generally conceded in 1935 that there were more unrecorded folktales in the parish of Carna alone than anywhere else in Western Europe.

In the fall of 1935, he was visited by Séamus Ó Duilearga and Liam MacCoisdeala, representatives of the Irish Folklore Commission. They recorded his repertoire of legends and folk poetry on a collection of Ediphone cylinders. The recordings were later transcribed, filling more than 2,000 pages of manuscript.

Éamon a Búrc told one folklore collector, "Now if you were here fifty years ago, the cart and the horse could not pull all the stories they told you!"

Liam Mac Coisdeala later said, "Anywhere I went, I never met a better seanachie than Éaman. I think perhaps there were no better seanachies in all Ireland at that time. And some of them were marvelous, of course. And good as he was at telling old stories, he was better yet at telling his own... Unfortunately, there are only a little more than 200 bits written down from him. There's no doubt that he knew much more... Éaman a Búrc was the best."

Éaman a Búrc died on November 6, 1942. A tribute to him was later published in Béaloideas, the official periodical of the Irish Folklore Commission, by Liam Mac Coisdeala.

== Legacy ==
The Encyclopaedia of Ireland states: "He was perhaps the finest storyteller collected from in the twentieth century. The longest folk-tale ever recorded in Ireland - taking three nights to tell and amounting to more than 30,000 words - was collected from him."

According to folklorist Seán Ó Súilleabháin, "Éamonn a Búrc was possibly the most accomplished narrator of folktales who has lived into our time. His artistry is at once evident in any of the tales which fill the two thousand pages of manuscript recorded from him by Mac Coisdeala. One of his hero tales, Eochair, mac Rí in Éirinn, recorded in October 1938, filled twenty-two Ediphone cylinders, that is, over 26,000 words."

In the 1966 volume Folktales of Ireland, six tales by Éamon a Búrc, as translated by Seán Ó Súilleabháin, appeared in English for the first time.

== See also ==
- Seanchaí

== Sources ==
- "The Encyclopaedia of Ireland," 2003; ISBN 0-7171-3000-2.
- Bridget Connelly, "Forgetting Ireland; Uncovering a Family's Secret History," Borealis Books, Minnesota Historical Society, 2003.
- Sean O'Sullivan, "Folktales of Ireland," University of Chicago, 1966.
