= Bruce Vento Nature Sanctuary =

Park in Saint Paul, Minnesota, United States

Waḳaƞ Ṭípi
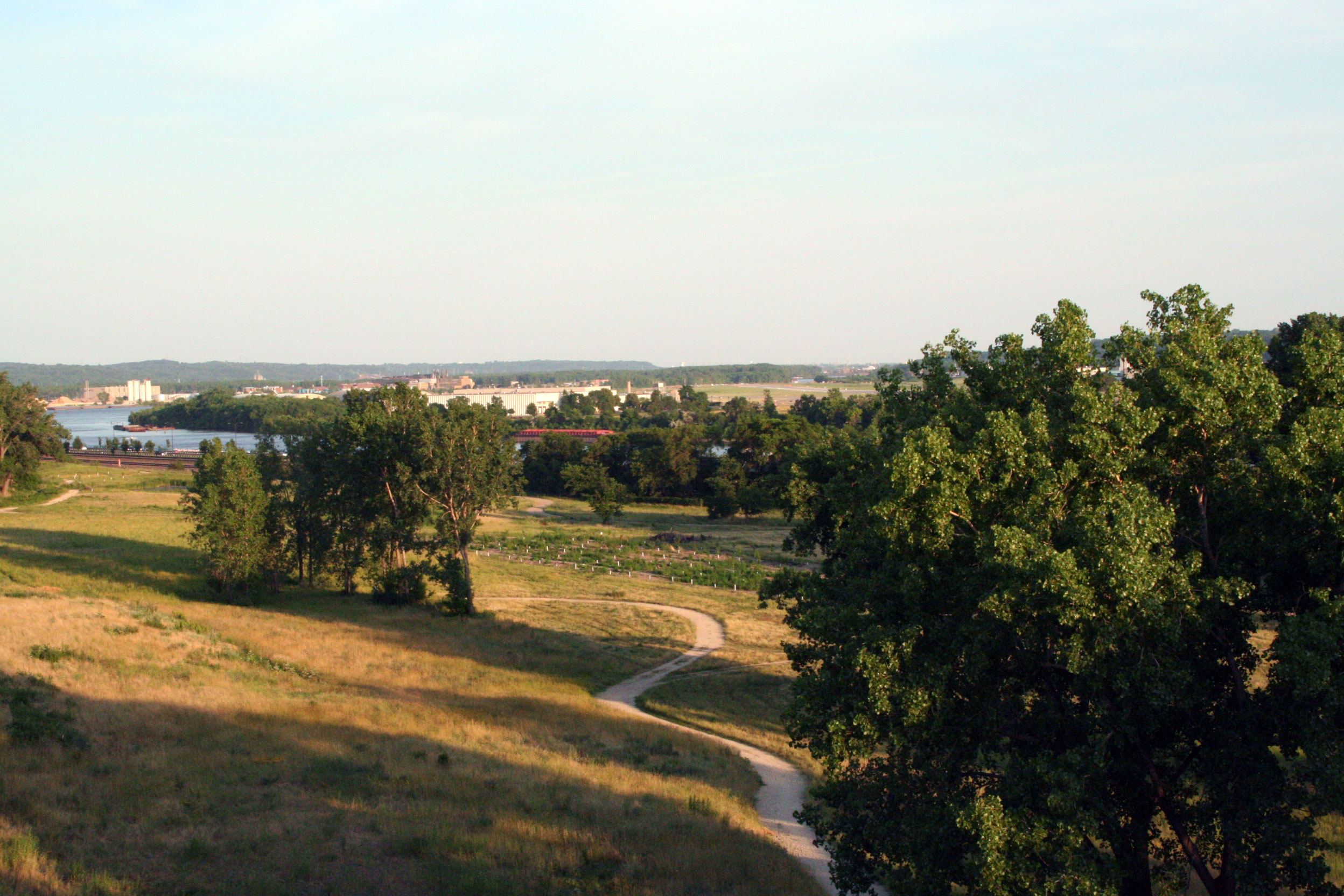
- Waḳaƞ Ṭípi looking toward the Mississippi River
- Interactive map of Waḳaƞ Ṭípi
- Location: Saint Paul, Minnesota, United States
- Coordinates: 44°57′3″N 93°4′17″W
- Created: 2005
- Operator: St. Paul Parks and Recreation

Waḳaƞ Ṭípi (previously named Bruce Vento Nature Sanctuary) is a city park in the Mississippi River corridor in Saint Paul, Minnesota. Just east of the city's downtown district, the sanctuary includes towering limestone and sandstone bluffs that date back more than 450 million years, spring-fed wetlands, abundant bird life, and dramatic views of the downtown Saint Paul skyline and Mississippi River. The park was opened to the public on May 21, 2005, and was originally named Bruce Vento Nature Sanctuary, after its early supporter U.S. Representative Bruce Vento. In May 2025 it was officially renamed Waḳaƞ Ṭípi, the Dakota name, to acknowledge and preserve the sacred importance of the site to the Dakota.

== History ==
The sanctuary has a rich ecological and human history. Once a floodplain where Phalen Creek and Trout Brook flowed together into the Mississippi River, the land was used and valued by Native people for thousands of years, and was home to Wakan Tipi (Spirit House), a sacred Dakota site also known as Carver's Cave, after explorer and writer Jonathan Carver. When the land that included today's Saint Paul was ceded to England after the French and Indian War, Carver was dispatched by England to explore the new colonial possession. He traveled up the Mississippi River, and encountered the Dakota on the bluffs in Saint Paul and Wakan Tipi on November 14, 1766. His discovery of the cave and the Dakota led him to explore the spiritual site, describing in detail, “The rock at the entrance of the cave is of lightish gray colour and very soft like the grit of a grindstone. I found many strange heiroglyphycks cut in the stone some of which was very ancient and grown over with moss. On the stone I marked the arms of the King of England.” Carver's recorded explorations later became a book, Travels through the Interior Parts of North America (1778), and he gave the landmark his own name. The book's popularity made Wakan Tipi an attraction for early settlers, but the cave was lost after falling limestone and debris covered its entrance.

In 1837, the Dakota ceded their lands east of the Mississippi River (35 million acres) after the early American expansion of the 1830s. Fourteen years later, the Mdewakanton Dakota ceded their lands west of the river for reservations up to the Minnesota River. After the Dakota were forced to leave, European immigrants took over the land and cultivated it, leading to industrial expansions. The North Star Brewery was built into the bluff in 1853 and later became Jacob Schmidt's first brewery. In the 1880s the land was claimed for industrial use, resulting in the expansion of railroads and the destruction of the Wakan Tipi petroglyphs.

Abandoned in the 1970s, the 27 acres (11 ha) of land were purchased through a broad partnership, and became a Saint Paul park in 2005. An additional 1.85 acres (0.75 ha) of adjacent industrial land were purchased and added to the park in 2008. The sanctuary's floodplain forests, oak woodlands, prairies and other native ecosystems are being carefully restored and the park has gained state and national recognition for its combination of ecological and cultural resources — and for the community involvement in its transformation.

== Management ==
Owned by the City of Saint Paul, the sanctuary lies within the National Park Service's Mississippi River and Recreation Area. The Trust for Public Land led acquisition efforts in the early 2000s and interns from the Community Design Center of Minnesota (now Urban Roots) East Side Youth Conservation Corps worked to restore the site's ecology and act as student naturalists during the initial restoration in 2004 and 2005. Neighborhood organizations, including the Dayton's Bluff Community Council and Friends of Swede Hollow, were also involved in the sanctuary while it was being established and continue to steward the adjacent Swede Hollow Park.

Now, Wakan Tipi Awanyankapi (WTA), a Native-led nonprofit, is the primary organization supporting the protection and stewardship of this land. WTA entered into a co-management agreement with the City of Saint Paul in 2024 to support the ongoing restoration and volunteer activities at the site. WTA has also developed a cultural and environmental interpretative center on site, Wakan Tipi Center.

== See also ==
- Bruce Vento Regional Trail
