= Bruce Vento Regional Trail =

Rail trail in Minnesota, USA

Coordinates: 44°58′44″N 93°2′48″W

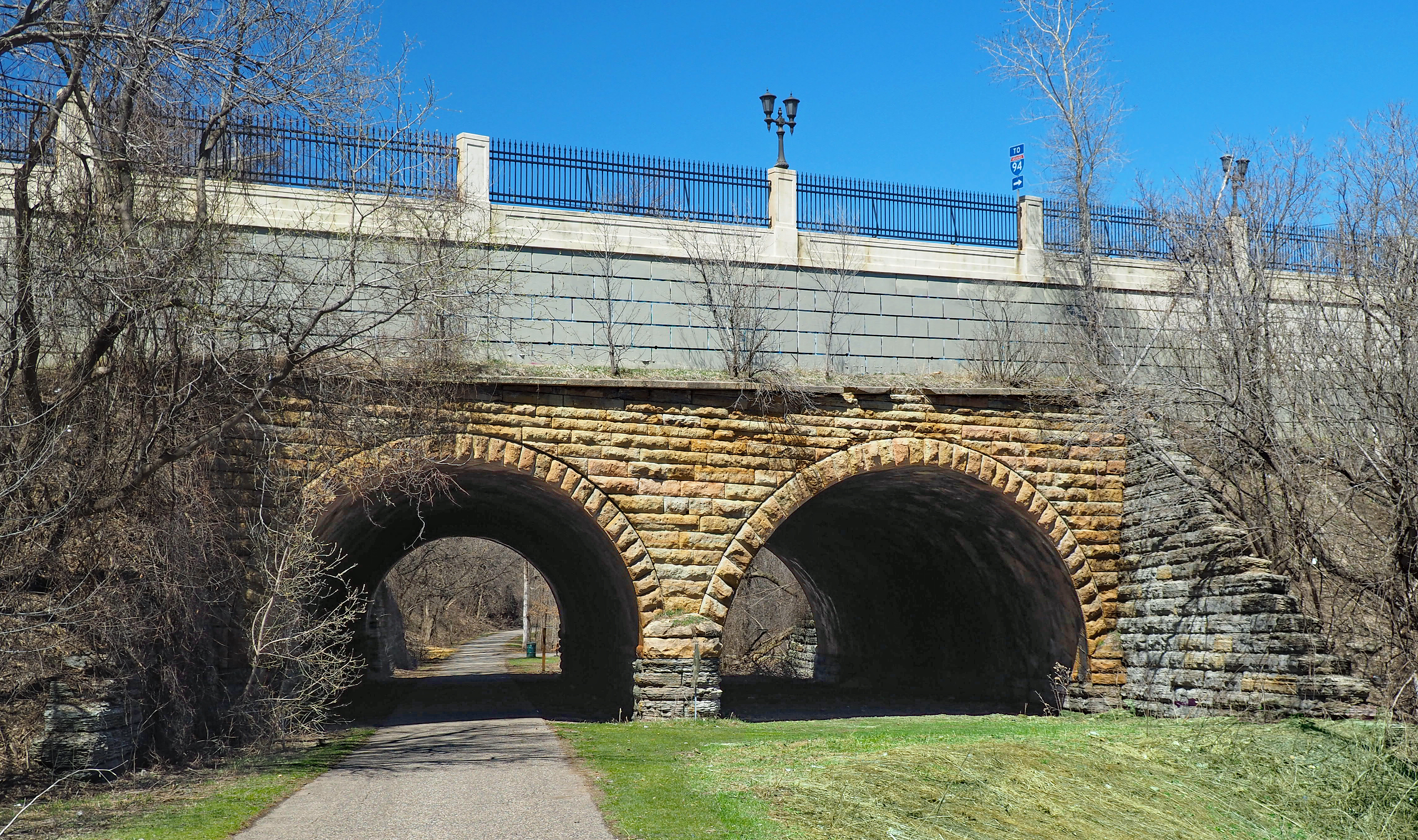
- The Bruce Vento Regional Trail running under the Seventh Street Improvement Arches
- Length: 7 mi (11 km)
- Location: Ramsey County, Minnesota, USA
- Trailheads: Bruce Vento Nature Sanctuary, St. Paul; Beam Avenue, Maplewood
- Use: Biking, hiking, in-line skating
- Difficulty: Easy
- Season: Year-round
- Sights: Swede Hollow, Greater East Side, Lake Phalen
- Hazards: Street crossings

The Bruce Vento Regional Trail is a rail trail in the cities of Vadnais Heights, Gem Lake, Maplewood, and Saint Paul, Minnesota, USA.

The trail occupies an abandoned Burlington Northern Railroad corridor and intersects with the Gateway State Trail in Maplewood and continues to just east of Lake Phalen in Saint Paul. South of the lake, it continues along Phalen Boulevard and through Swede Hollow to its terminus near Seventh Street. Another spur off of Phalen Boulevard continues west, going over a long bridge that crosses very active railroad tracks, and terminates at Interstate 35E.

The trail is approximately seven miles (11 km) long from its northern end just north of Interstate 694 to the southern terminus near Seventh Street and Payne Avenue. The extension along Phalen Boulevard is 1.3 miles (2.1 km). Most of the trail was built in the late 1990s. The section along Phalen Boulevard was paved in late 2005.

The trail leads through an abandoned rail corridor and is mostly off the road. In some places it goes through residential neighborhoods. There are some views of Lake Phalen through the trees. The section in Swede Hollow is particularly scenic where it runs through a ravine except for the presence of out-of-scale billboards. The south end of the trail features the Seventh Street Improvement Arches. This is a historic bridge built to carry the St. Paul and Duluth Railroad underneath Seventh Street. North beyond this are abandoned factories that belong to 3M. The Phalen Boulevard extension goes through more industrial and office areas, but at the top of the bridge over Westminster Junction, there is a historical exhibit with descriptions of how the railroads developed along with the city.

The trail is named for U.S. Representative Bruce Vento.

This former Burlington Northern Railroad corridor was formerly used by the Northern Pacific Railway and was originally built as the St. Paul and Duluth Railroad.

== See also ==
- Bruce Vento Nature Sanctuary
