= Roger Strand =

Roger Strand may refer to:

- Roger Gordon Strand (1934–2017), United States district judge
- Roger Ernest Strand (born 1948), American politician in Minnesota
