= Gateway State Trail =

Rail trail in Minnesota, United States

Coordinates: 45°1′24″N 92°58′40″W

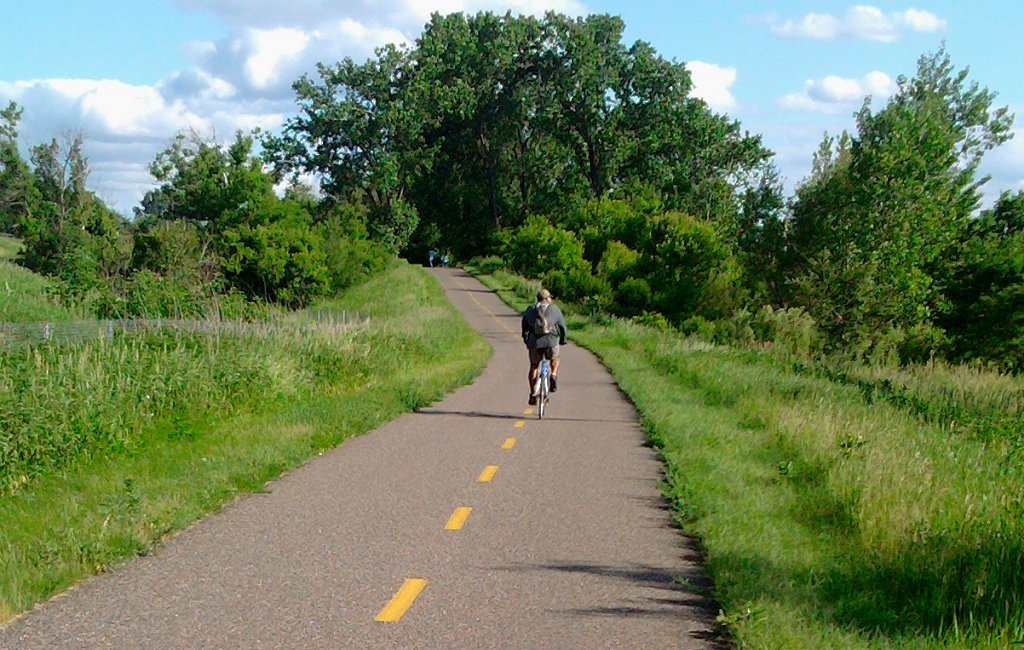
- The Gateway State Trail traverses urban open space in the heart of Saint Paul, Minnesota
- Length: 18.3 mi (29.5 km)
- Location: Ramsey and Washington Counties, Minnesota, USA
- Designation: Minnesota state trail National Recreation Trail
- Trailheads: Cayuga Park, St. Paul; Pine Point Regional Park, Stillwater
- Use: Biking, hiking, in-line skating. Partial: carriage driving, cross-country skiing, horseback riding, mountain biking
- Grade: Level
- Difficulty: Easy
- Season: Year-round
- Sights: St. Paul, Phalen-Keller Regional Park, wetlands, North St. Paul Snowman, Gateway Trail Iron Bridge, Stillwater
- Hazards: Road crossings, severe weather
- Surface: Asphalt, partial dirt parallel
- Website: Gateway State Trail

The Gateway State Trail is a multi-use recreational rail trail in the U.S. state of Minnesota, running 18 miles (29 km) from Saint Paul to Pine Point Regional Park in Stillwater. It runs through urban landscapes of eastern Saint Paul in Ramsey County and rural farmland and forests in Washington County. It was designated a National Recreation Trail in 2002.

The trail is open to walking, jogging, cycling, inline skating, and roller skiing during the summer. A side trail is designed for horseback riding. During the winter separate sections invite snowshoeing or cross-country skiing. Both horseback riding and cross-country skiing require permits from the Minnesota Department of Natural Resources.

== Historical development ==
=== Historical significance ===
The Gateway State Trail follows part of the Soo Line Railroad that served the upper Midwest and connected the Twin Cities of Minneapolis and Saint Paul, Minnesota with the Twin Ports of Duluth and Superior, Wisconsin on Lake Superior.

=== Trail history and evolution ===
In 1980 the "Interstate Commerce Commission issued an order, authorizing abandonment of the Soo Line railroad track on January 23, 1980, 'conditioned on a public use in accordance with the plans of the Minnesota Department of Natural Resources.' That condition opened the door for converting the railroad line into a recreational trail, and interested citizens seized the opportunity."

At the urging of county governments, the state Department of Natural Resources (DNR) took steps to acquire the eastern 10 miles (16 km) of the designated rail. However citizens owning abutting private property started a bidding war in an attempt to stop the creation of the trail. Money given by the Minnesota Parks Foundation allowed the state to purchase the property in auction, but the citizens then brought a suit against the state arguing that "the right-of-way reverted to abutting property owners once it ceased to be operated for railroad purposes. In a landmark decision, the Minnesota Supreme Court held that no such reversion takes place as long as the right-of-way continues to be used for public travel purposes even as a recreational trail."

After the Minnesota Supreme Court decision, the state acquired the western 10 miles (16 km) of the trail. The Minnesota Legislature appropriated funds to build the trail in 1990, and in 1993 the trail opened for use. Recently the state has acquired property to extend the Gateway Trail north to Taylors Falls, south to the Minnesota State Capitol, and east to downtown Stillwater. The Stillwater connection, via the Brown's Creek State Trail, was completed in 2014. However funding to complete newly acquired sections of the trail has not been appropriated.

== Trail development ==
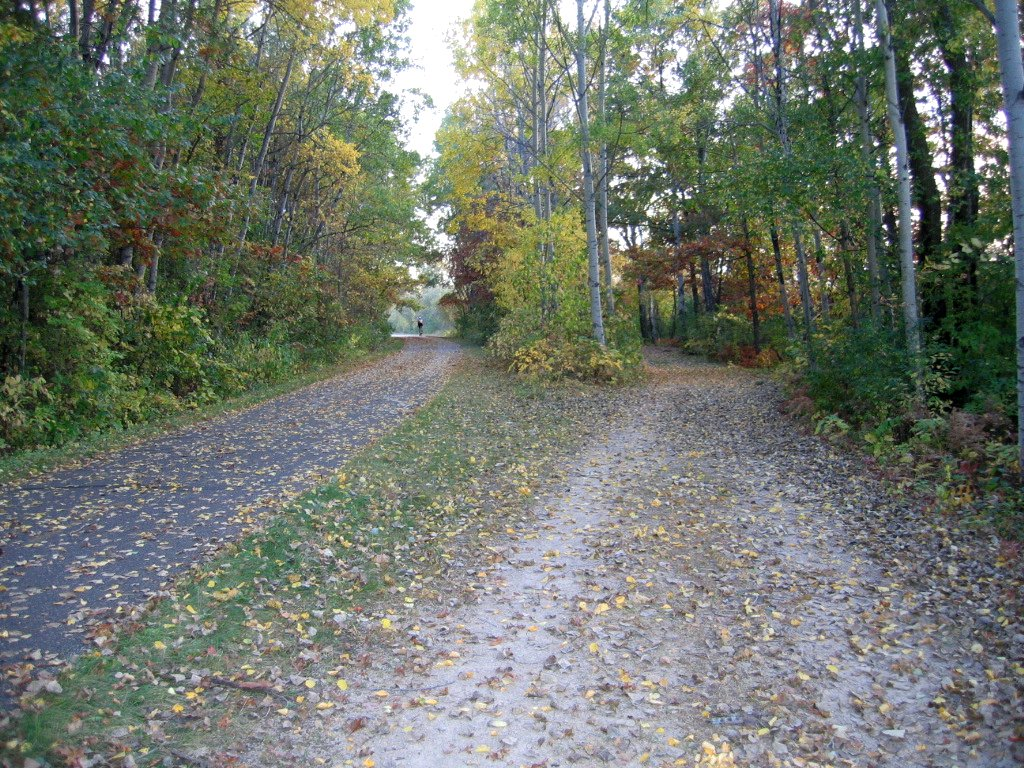
A section of the Gateway State Trail with parallel paved and unpaved trackways

=== Design and construction ===
An asphalt track runs the entire length of the developed corridor, and a segregated natural surface track for horseback riding and cross country skiing parallels the asphalt track for 9.2 miles (14.8 km) between Interstate 694 and the trail's terminus at Pine Point Regional Park. In winter the segment of paved track along the natural surface track is groomed for cross country skiing. The trail is wheelchair accessible, and many road crossings are served with under or over passes.

=== Amenities ===
Parking, restrooms, and water fountains are provided along the 18-mile (29 km) route. At the Phalen-Keller Regional Park picnic tables, a fishing dock, softball/baseball diamonds, playgrounds, and a sliding hill are available. At the Pine Point County Park trailhead, picnic tables are available. Community gardens are located along the trail, and community artists are also featured. During the winter the western sections of the trail are plowed, while the eastern sections are left unplowed to allow for cross-country skiing and snowshoeing.

== Community ==
The trail is maintained by the state Department of Natural Resources. A conservation group, the Parks and Trail Council of Minnesota, works to promote wildlife and conservation efforts along the trail. Members of the Brown's Creek Trail Association (GBCTA), a citizen's group, support the trail through their efforts to:

- Promote improvements to make the trail a pleasurable experience for all users and abutting property owners
- Support adequate state funding for trail maintenance
- Publish a newsletter on trail events, improvements and ecology
- Provide feedback, support and constructive criticism to the State DNR
- Provide a forum for the competing needs of recreational users and abutting property owners
- Sponsor "Adopt-a-Trail" commitments to help keep the trail and abutting property clean
- Develop signage and educational programs for public use

The Gateway Brown's Creek Trail Association also works with local schools and artists to place artwork along the trail. A recent project, headed by local Hmong American artist David Vang, has focused on interpretations of the word "welcome" in the cultures of people who live along and utilize the trail. Local students at the Mississippi Magnet Creative Arts School created tiles interpreting their idea of welcome, and a mosaic of them will serve as a welcome sign for a future community garden site.

Note that the previous name for the GBCTA was the Gateway Trail Association.
