= Gateway Trail Iron Bridge =

Bridge in Minnesota, US

- Coordinates: 45°06′14″N 92°51′54″W

Statistics
- Bridge No. 5721
- U.S. National Register of Historic Places
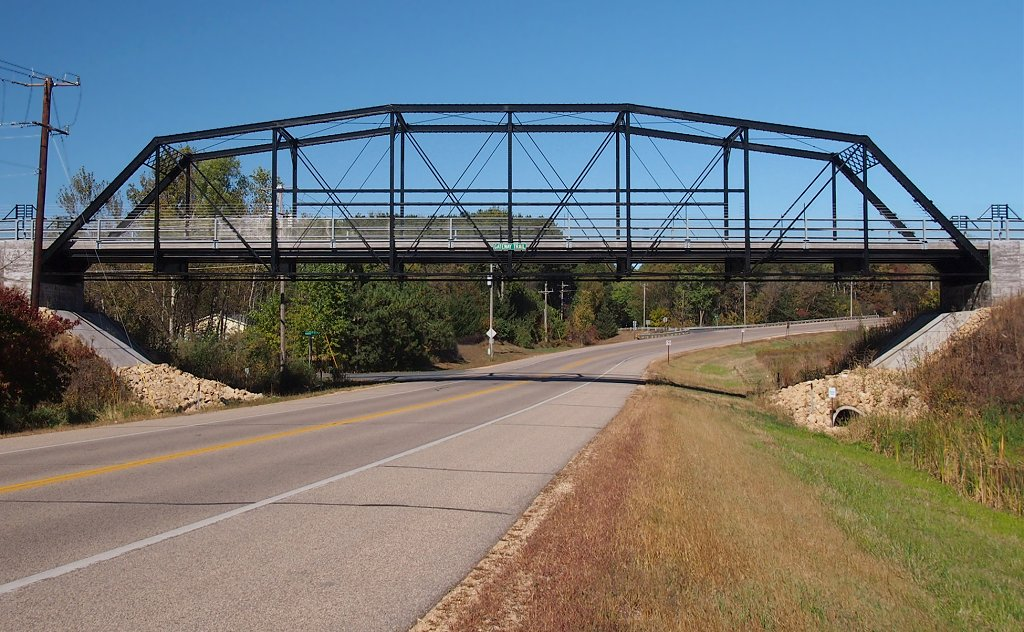
- The Gateway Trail Iron Bridge from the southeast

- Location within Minnesota Location within the United States
- Location: Gateway State Trail over Manning Avenue, Grant, Minnesota
- Coordinates: 45°6′16″N 92°51′54″W
- Area: Less than one acre
- Built: 1873
- Built by: E.W. Coons, Inc.
- Architect: Minnesota Highway Department
- Architectural style: Camelback through truss
- MPS: Iron and Steel Bridges in Minnesota MPS
- NRHP reference No.: 98000717
- Designated NRHP: July 13, 1998

Location
- Interactive map of Gateway Trail Iron Bridge

The Gateway Trail Iron Bridge is a historic camelback truss bridge on the Gateway State Trail in Grant, Minnesota, United States. The bridge has stood in three locations in Minnesota. Its main span was built of wrought iron in 1873—before steel became the preferred material for metal bridges—and erected in Sauk Centre in Central Minnesota. Designated Bridge No. 5721, it was refurbished and moved in 1937 to rural Koochiching County in northern Minnesota, where it became known as the Silverdale Bridge. It was relocated to its present site in east-central Minnesota in 2011 and renamed Bridge No. 82524. It was listed on the National Register of Historic Places in 1998 for its state-level significance in engineering. It was nominated as a rare example of a wrought iron truss bridge with ornamental detailing.

== Description ==
The historic main span of the Gateway Trail Iron Bridge is a camelback through truss of pin-connected wrought iron. It spans 160 feet (49 m) in eight panels. Its bracing members are decorated with ornamental latticework. It originally had a wood deck but was given a lightweight concrete deck during the 2011 relocation to accommodate equestrian use. The side railings were retained from its 1937 iteration, though respaced according to modern safety standards. Although it was a visual departure from its historic appearance, cables were strung above the railings to protect horseback riders and bicyclists from being thrown off the bridge in the case of an accident.

== History ==
The bridge was originally constructed over the Sauk River in the city of Sauk Centre. It was completed in 1873, accommodating horse and buggy traffic on the town's Main Street. At some point it was dismantled and put into storage in Sauk Centre.

In 1937 the bridge was taken out of storage and reassembled at 47°58′34″N 93°8′37″W, about two miles southwest of Silverdale in Koochiching County. There it carried Minnesota State Highway 65 over the Little Fork River. Steel, which had come into favor for bridges in the 1890s, was used for the new approaches on either end. It was listed on the National Register of Historic Places as "Bridge No. 5721" in 1998.

Within a few years it was clear that Bridge 5721 was insufficient for the demands of modern traffic, particularly the logging trucks common in northern Minnesota. An analysis in 2006 determined that the bridge was insufficient for highway use but retained its historic design integrity and was a candidate for rehabilitation in a less rigorous context. The Minnesota Department of Transportation collaborated with the Minnesota Department of Natural Resources to determine possible new locations. One was identified on the Gateway State Trail where the rail trail intersected a county highway on a level crossing. Bridge 5721 was dismantled in 2009 and put in storage while the new site was prepared. In May 2011 the reassembled truss was hoisted into place. It now serves pedestrians, bicyclists, and horses much as it did in its first incarnation.

== See also ==
- List of bridges on the National Register of Historic Places in Minnesota
- National Register of Historic Places listings in Washington County, Minnesota
