= Ola Larsmo =

Swedish writer (born 1957)

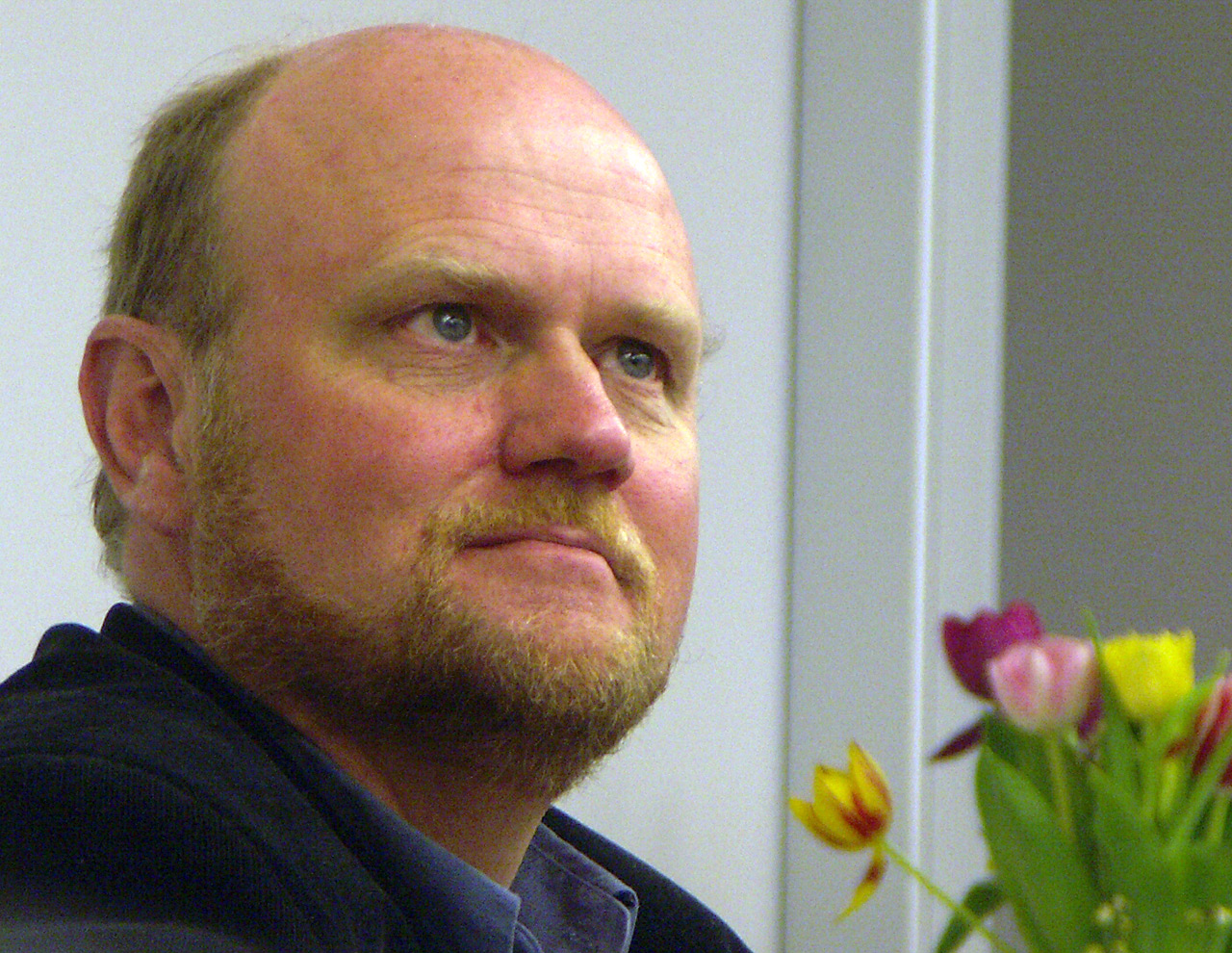
Ola Larsmo.

Ola Larsmo was born in 1957 in Sundbyberg and has lived in Västervik for ten years. He studied at Uppsala University, mainly in North Germanic languages, literature, theology and history.

== Career ==
Larsmo was editor of BLM from 1984 to 1990, and now works as writer and freelance critic, mainly for Dagens Nyheter. He was a member of the board at Författarförbundet ("Authors association") until May 2003. As of 2011, he has been living in Uppsala.

== Honors and awards ==
In 2008 he was awarded the Bjørnson Prize.

Larsmo was appointed to the Moa Martinson visiting professorship at Linköping University for the academic year 2023–2024, specialising in the contribution of the historic novel to research, and historical falsification, historical distortion, and the role of the scholar.

== Books ==
- Vindmakaren ("The wind maker"; In Fyra kortromaner, 1983)
- Fågelvägen ("As the bird flies"; novel, 1985)
- Engelska parken ("The English park"; novel, 1988)
- Odysséer (essays, 1990),
- Stumheten ("The dumbness"; short stories, 1981),
- Himmel och jord må brinna ("Heaven and earth will burn"; historic novel, 1993, paperback 1995),
- Maroonberget ("The Maroon Mountain"; novel, 1996),
- net.wars (debate book about IT and democracy, with Lars Ilshammar, 1997, paperback 1999).
- Joyce bor inte här längre, ("Joyce doesn't live here any more"), a book about Irish literature written with Stephen Farran-Lee (1999).
- Norra Vasa 133 (novel, 1999)
- Andra sidan ( "The other side", literary essays, 2001).
- En glänta i skogen ("A glen in the forest", novel, 2004)
- 404 (debate on the Internet and democracy, with Lars Ilshammar, 2005)
- Djävulssonaten ("The devil's sonata", essays on Swedish antisemitism during World War II, 2007)
- Jag vill inte tjäna ("I don't want to serve", novel, 2009)
- Förrädare ("Deceit", novel, 2012)
- 101 historiska hjältar ("101 human rights' heroes", with Brian Palmer, 2013)
- Swede Hollow (novel about Swedish emigrants who settled in Swede Hollow, Saint Paul, 2016)
- Översten ("The Colonel", historical novel about Oscar Broady, 2020)
