= Swede Hollow, Saint Paul =

Human settlement in Saint Paul, Minnesota, US

Coordinates: 44.9603°N 93.076°W

Swede Hollow was a neighborhood of Saint Paul, Minnesota, from the 1850s to 1956. Located on the city's East Side, it lay east of the Railroad Island neighborhood and at the northwestern base of Dayton's Bluff. The Hamm's Brewery complex bordered it to the north, while the Seventh Street Improvement Arches marked its southern boundary. Despite being one of Saint Paul's oldest settlements, it was also its poorest, housing successive waves of immigrants in substandard conditions. Swedes, Poles, Italians, and Mexicans each called the valley home during different periods.

== History ==
The area was originally a small, steep, wooded ravine cut through by Phalen Creek. The first settler, Edward Phelan, moved there in 1841. Phelan fled Minnesota in 1850 after perjury charges arose but not before leaving a mark that would change what was once Mill Creek to Phalen. Among the earliest inhabitants to settle permanently in the isolated spot were Swedish immigrants. First arriving in the 1850s, they gave their new home the name "Svenska Dalen" (lit. [the] Swedish Valley), a designation that remained (in English translation) long after they moved on, to be replaced by a wave of Italian immigrants in the early 20th century. At the time of the neighborhood's demise in the mid-fifties, it had attracted some Mexican families as well.

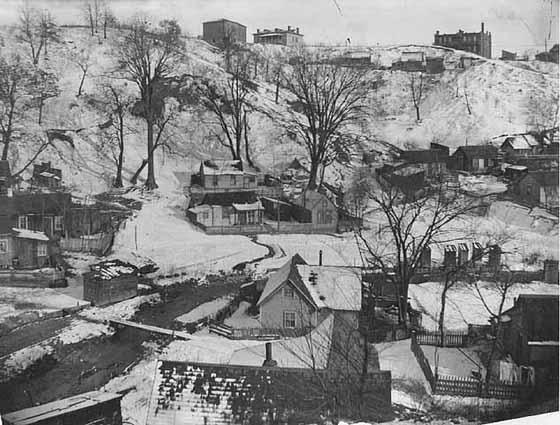
Swede Hollow in 1910 which was during the later years of Swedish immigration.

Although remembered with a certain nostalgia today, the former area was a true slum. People and industries occupying the surrounding "upper" neighborhoods used the Hollow as a makeshift dump, which the inhabitants down below routinely scavenged for clothing, metals, building supplies, and even shoe repair needs. Several gristmills operated on the creek by the 1850s. Railroad tracks were built along the creek in 1865 because the creek bed provided an easier grade up from the Mississippi River than bluffs elsewhere.

Unusually for a neighborhood in the heart of a mid-20th-century major American city (especially given the Twin Cities' challenging climate), Swede Hollow was never electrified, and plumbing was extremely primitive. The residences were constructed almost entirely out of recovered and scrapped building materials and serviced by a single dirt road. Toilets consisted of outhouses constructed directly over Phalen Creek. The original inhabitants got their water from springs and used Phalen Creek as their sewer, leading to sanitation problems.

== Destruction ==
So squalid were the conditions of the Hollow, in fact, that in 1956 the city declared the entire neighborhood a health hazard. The last remaining families were forcibly evicted, and the entire housing stock was burnt to the ground on December 11 of the same year. At one time (1905) as many as 1,000 people called the tiny little glade their home, although there were far fewer (14 families in all) remaining at the time of the December 11, 1956 clearing.

== Today ==
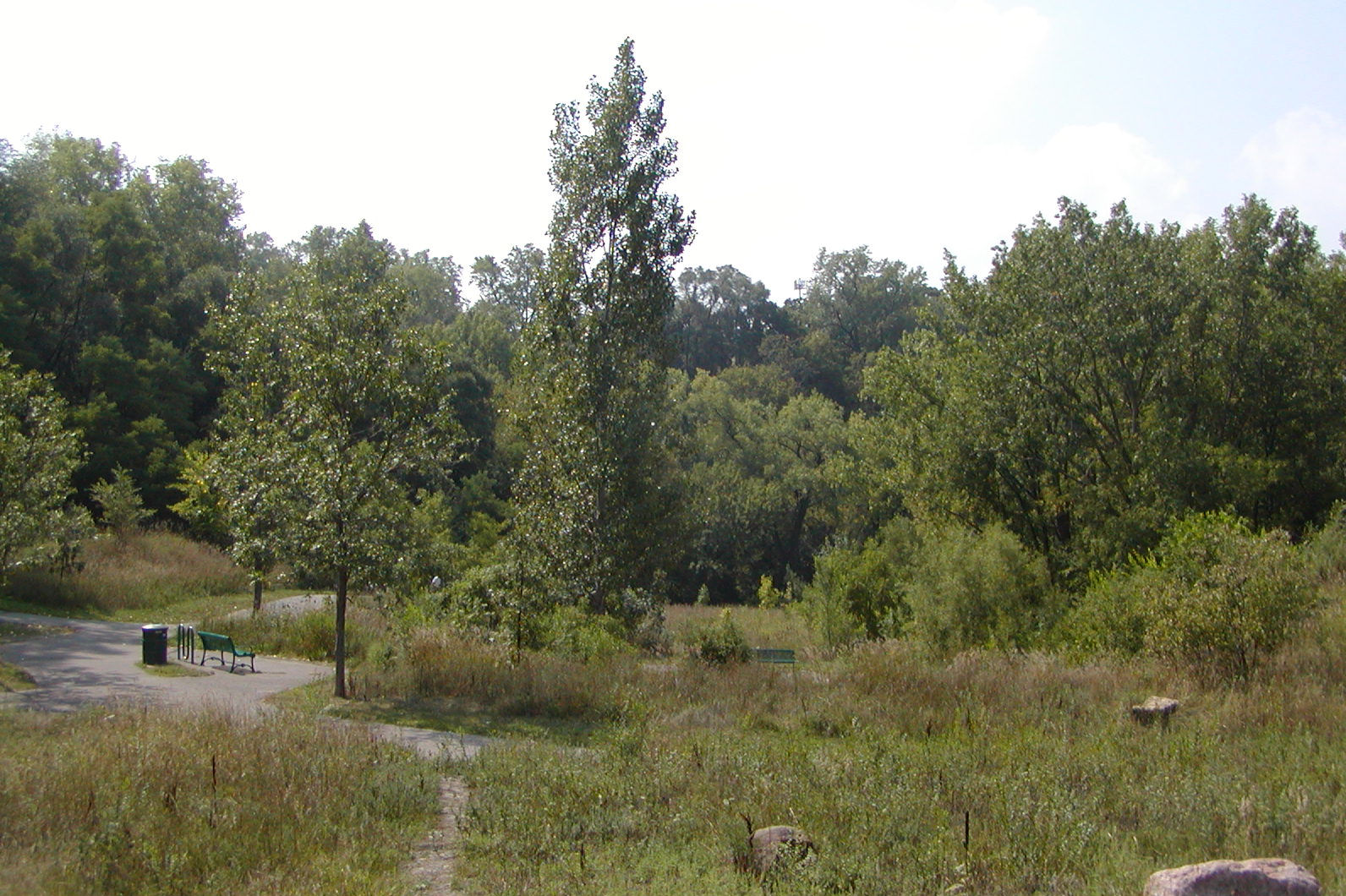
Swede Hollow Park 2008

Soon after the destruction, the area became a dumping ground and gathering place for the homeless. In the 1970s the valley was cleaned up, and it was designated a nature center in 1976. A 1917 report remarked, "Phalen Creek and the banks of this stream are ideal for park purposes, while in their present state they constitute a menace to the health of the residents and to the community at large." The area remains uninhabited to this day. The original woodland state has returned (although some of the building foundations still remain), the creek has been partially restored, and the entire valley has been made part of Swede Hollow Park, a city park. The trail running along the west edge of Swede Hollow is the Bruce Vento Regional Trail, paved on the former right-of-way of the Northern Pacific Railway's Skally Line that ran from St. Paul to Duluth.

The award-winning album Minnesota: A History of the Land, released by musician Peter Ostroushko in 2005, included a piece called "Swede Hollow Lament". In 2012 composer Ann Millikan premiered an opera about Swede Hollow.

In Sweden, the history of 19th-century migration to Minnesota was popularized by Vilhelm Moberg's four-novel series The Emigrants (1949–1959), which describes rural, hard-working, successful settlers in the 1850s. Former ABBA members Björn Ulvaeus and Benny Andersson adapted these books into the 1995 musical Kristina från Duvemåla. The poorer, urban, less successful emigrants of the 1890s received less attention until described in Ola Larsmo's 2016 novel Swede Hollow, which has also been adapted into a play.

== Connemara Patch ==
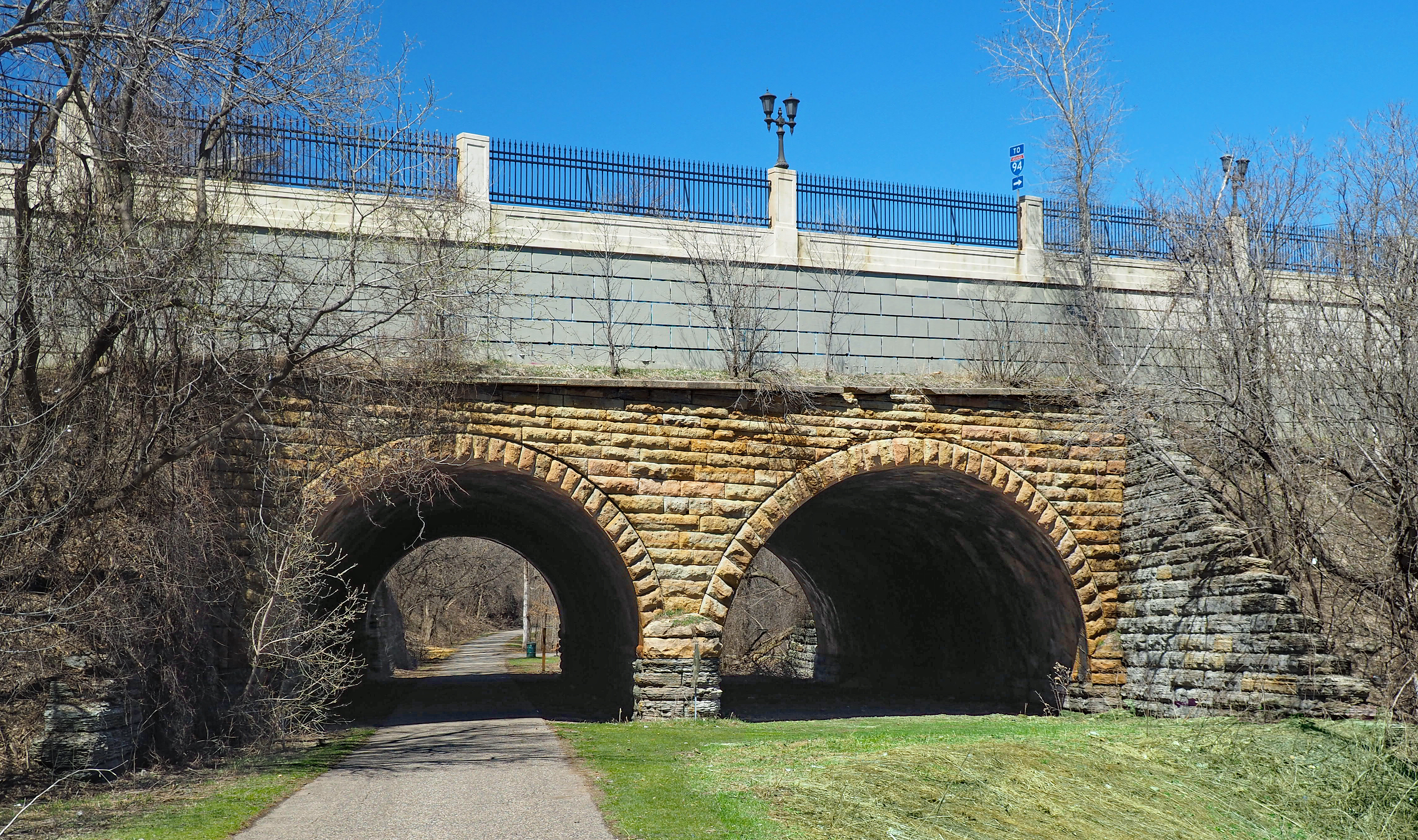
The Seventh Street Improvement Arches separated Swede Hollow from Connemara Patch. This photo is taken from the south of the arches; to the north, past the bridge, is Swede Hollow.

Just south and downstream of Swede Hollow was a lesser-known Irish neighborhood called Connemara Patch. It was so named after the original home of its Irish settlers, who arrived in the United States under the sponsorship of Archbishop John Ireland, who settled them on prairie claims near Graceville, Minnesota. When the original rural colonization plan was aborted by poor planning and the long, blizzard-wracked "Snow Winter" of 1880-81 (a season so harsh it was immortalized in the Laura Ingalls Wilder book The Long Winter), the desperate immigrants were resettled along lower Phalen Creek in the area between East Seventh and East Fourth streets as a stopgap measure—one that ultimately became permanent. The legendary Irish-language storyteller Éamon a Búrc spent several years in the district before a railroad accident took his leg, leading him to return to his village in County Galway, Ireland.

Like Swede Hollow, Connemara Patch was eventually cleared of its inhabitants. The neighborhood's remnants were completely destroyed by urban renewal in the 1950s. Interstate 94 currently occupies a substantial portion of the old enclave. The rest of the site is largely vacant, except for a few dilapidated industrial structures.
