= Irish Folklore Commission =

Organization to study and collect information on the folklore and traditions of Ireland

The Irish Folklore Commission (Irish: Coimisiún Béaloideasa Éireann) was set up in 1935 by the Irish Government to study and collect information on the folklore and traditions of Ireland.

== History ==
Séamus Ó Duilearga (James Hamilton Delargy) founded An Cumann le Béaloideas Éireann (The Folklore of Ireland Society) and its journal Béaloideas in 1927. Ó Duilearga prescribed a guideline for gathered oral tradition, for example, insisting that the collected data identified the informant's name and age as well as provenance of material. The Society would not only edit and publish the collected folklore, but endeavor to supply a translation or at least a summary in German, English, or French. It was a call for the preservation of Irish folklore, and his countrymen heeded the appeal by sending in manuscripts to the Society, and these materials would be published in the Béaloideas periodical.

Public sentiment mounted that such a grave undertaking should not be left entirely to a voluntary society, and the Irish government established the Institiúid Bhéaloideas Éireann (The Irish Folk Institute) in 1930, to be headed by Ó Duilearga, with other board members of An Cumann recruited alongside.

A few years later in 1935, the Irish Folklore Commission (Coimisiún Béaloideasa Éireann) was formed by the government when its precursor was deemed inadequate, and a larger organization which was better equipped felt needed. Ó Duilearga was appointed honorary director of the commission, and led its effort.

The Commission continued its work by that name until 1971 when it was superseded by the Department of Irish Folklore the University College, Dublin. The department has since served as a repository of the data collected, including the Irish Folklore Collection, which later became the National Folklore Collection, at the UCD Delargy Centre for Irish Folklore and the National Folklore Collection.

== Work and legacy ==
The commission was responsible for the collection of preservation of Irish folk tradition of all forms, with the additional tasks of cataloguing the material under classification, their study and exposition.

With funding at a limit, the commission was often limited to six to nine collectors. While graduate and university students could be of great help as collectors, the commission was focused on Ireland's diverse populations. They went to fisherman, primary teachers, as well as professional collectors with the idea that "anyone who does go among the people must go among them as one of themselves and have no high-faluting nonsense about them".

The Irish Folklore Commission also made an effort to collect folk music and song. Ó Duilearga professed to not being very musically oriented, and the commission hired Liam de Noraidh as full-time collector, until he had to resign in 1942 due to poor health, and replaced by Séamus Ennis, who used the Ediphone recording device extensively.

The commission was also closely involved with locals, especially Irish-speaking districts. They distributed questionnaires and used media outlets to inform the general public of the commission. The commission also began making recordings in 1948 of the dwindling number of native speakers of Manx Gaelic on the Isle of Man,

During its time, the extensive collecting by the Commission caught the attention of many foreign scholars. With greater recognition, Ó Duilearga's vision for the Commission grew and around the 1950s many scholars were participating by contributing to collections and research.

=== Recording devices ===
The commission owned a substantial collection of Ediphone recordings on cylinders, obtained through purchases (e.g. the Fr. Luke Donnellan folksong collection, acquired 1939) or from full-time music collectors by the time Ennis was hired in 1942, and he began by transcribing them onto paper, later using the Ediphone as recording instrument for field work, some time between 1943 and 1944 perhaps (the circumstances are unclear). The device, despite its shortcomings, did help them to collect lyrics more efficiently.

The Ediphone was also used to record long folktales, although it could not be utilized in some cases, for example, some of the reciters were uncomfortable in its presence. The Ediphone was also prodigiously heavy, and together with a supply of cylinders, was cumbersome carrying across rough terrain. The commission could not afford a constant fresh supply of cylinders, so the recordings had to be reused and overwritten after being transcribed.

Ó Duilearga had since the very beginning harbored the design of using the gramophone as recording device, since each vinyl disc was not more durable and far more affordable than the Ediphone wax cylinders. The problem of the machine's cost, some $500, was obviated when the Edison Company made a present of it free of charge, and the gramophone arrived at the Commission in June 1940. Unfortunately, the Commission at this time was unable to adapt the device for field work, and as WWII had already started, it was also difficult procuring parts from America or England. It would not be until 1947 that the commission would figure out how to use the gramophone for collecting folklore in the field. The Commission decided to purchase the necessary sets of mobile recording equipment on its meagre budget, if only to carry out the project of recording the remnants of the Manx language (1948). This had been something of a pet project of Éamon de Valera's, though the politician had been rather sluggish in responding to the pleas of a budget for the proper equipment.

=== School's Collection ===
Among the Irish Folklore Commission's collections are written interviews recorded between 1937 and 1939. Known collectively as The School's Collection, these interviews were conducted by more than 50,000 school children from all primary schools in the South of Ireland. This was possible with a grant of $500 from the Rockefeller Foundation. The 1,128 volumes include written accounts are sorted of daily life as well as regional folklore and stories as told by the interviewees. This was instigated by Seán Ó Súilleabháin and Séamus Ó Duilearga, who publicized the scheme and explained to teachers what folklore was and how to properly collect it. They met with principal teachers, who then explained to the children how to collect the folklore for the collection. They received a grant from the Rockefeller Foundation of 500 dollars.From September to June, each week the teacher would choose a heading and read out the questions, and the children would copy it down and question their family members and neighbors. In June 1939, Ó Duilearga stated in his annual report that there were collectively 375,660 pages of books from the schools.

=== Dúchas Project ===
The Dúchas Project is an online crowdsourcing effort to digitize and transcribe the National Folklore Collection in order to make it accessible and searchable worldwide. Based online, the project includes (1) both digitized and transcribed volumes of the collection; (2) a search feature to find people, topics, and places mentioned in the collections; (4) an index of Irish surnames, and (5) numerous historical photographs.

Transcriptions of the collection are crowdsourced from around the world, and volunteers transcribe pages from the journal, allowing each page transcribed to become searchable from within the page itself and via internet search databases.

== See also ==
- Irish language
- Irish folklore
- Peig Sayers
- Éamon a Búrc
- Kevin Danaher
