= Roger Ernest Strand =

American politician (born 1948)

Member of the Minnesota Senate
- In office 1977–1980

Personal details
- Born: April 4, 1948 (age 78) Morris, Minnesota, U.S.
- Party: Democratic
- Education: University of Minnesota Morris, Minnesota State University, Mankato
- Occupation: Politician, Farmer

Roger Ernest Strand (born April 4, 1948) is an American politician and farmer.

Strand was born in Morris, Minnesota and grew up in Cyrus, Minnesota. He graduated from Cyrus High School in 1966 and received his bachelor's degree in political science from the University of Minnesota Morris in 1970. Strand went to Minnesota State University, Mankato for graduate school in public administration and constitutional law. He was a farmer. Strand served as court administrator for Traverse County, Minnesota and for Big Stone County, Minnesota. He served in the Minnesota Senate from 1977 to 1980 and was a Democrat. In 2005, Strand served on the Graceville, Minnesota City Council.
