= Seventh Street Improvement Arches =

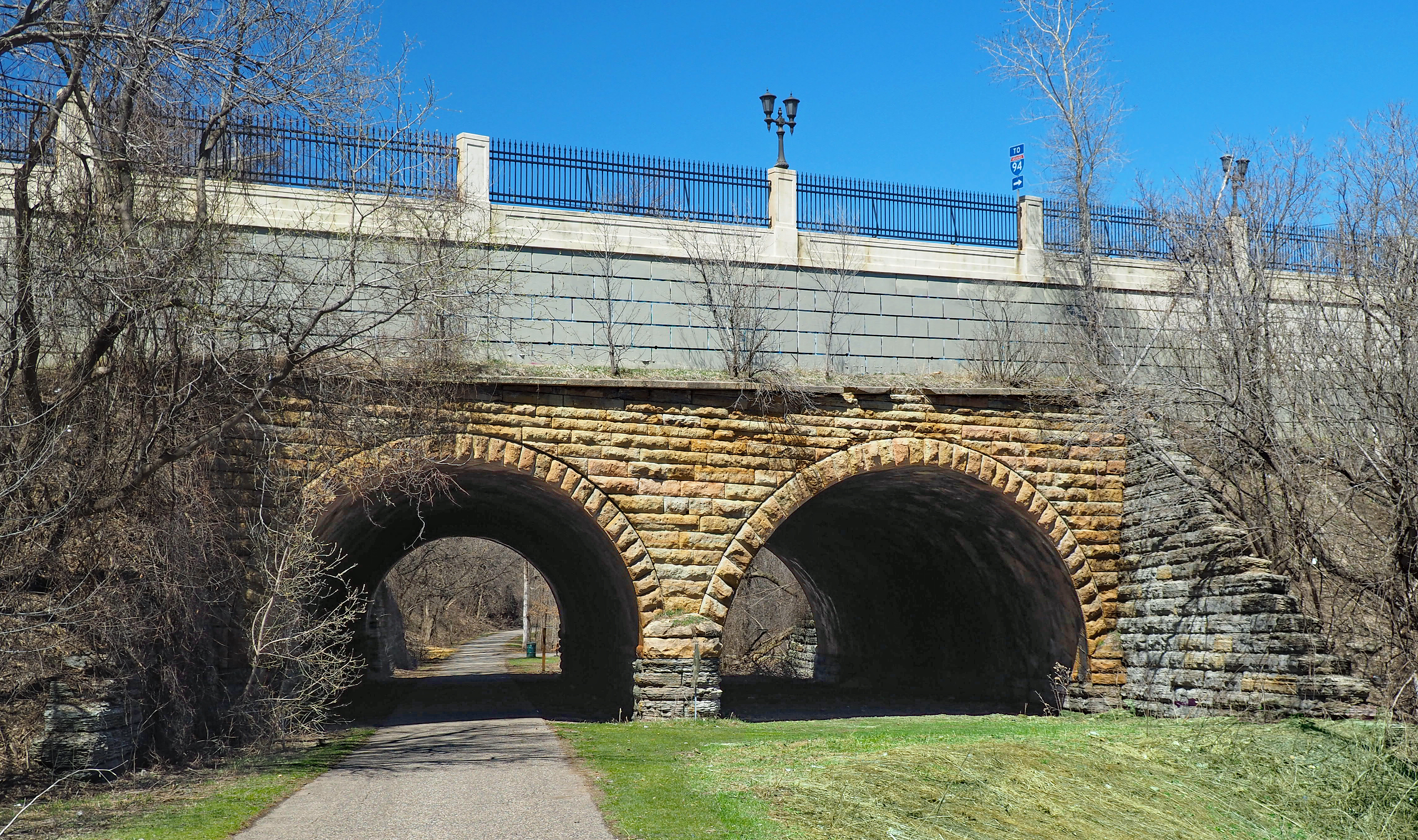
- The Seventh Street Improvement Arches viewed from the south
- Coordinates: 44°57′23″N 93°04′38″W
- Carries: Four lanes of MN 5 (East Seventh Street)
- Crosses: Bruce Vento Regional Trail (former trackage of St. Paul and Duluth Railroad)
- Locale: Saint Paul, Minnesota
- ID number: 90386

Characteristics
- Design: Skewed, helicoidal, double stone arch bridge
- Total length: 27.4 metres (90 ft)
- Width: 124 feet
- Longest span: 41 feet (east arch), 30 feet (west arch)
- Clearance below: 6.37 metres (20.9 ft)

History
- Opened: 1884

Statistics
- Daily traffic: 21524

Location
- Interactive map of Seventh Street Improvement Arches

The Seventh Street Improvement Arches are a double-arched masonry highway bridge that formerly spanned the St. Paul and Duluth Railroad tracks in Saint Paul, Minnesota, United States. The Seventh Street Improvement Arches are historically significant for its rarity and the technically demanding nature of its skewed, helicoidal spiral, stone-arch design. The bridge is one of the few of its type in the United States, and is the only known bridge of its type in Minnesota. It was built from 1883 to 1884 by Michael O'Brien and McArthur Brothers of Chicago and was designed by William A. Truesdell. The bridge was listed on the National Register of Historic Places in 1989 and on the American Society of Civil Engineers Historic Civil Engineering Landmarks in 2000.

The bridge was proposed in 1883 as part of a group of improvements along Seventh Street, linking downtown St. Paul with the Dayton's Bluff neighborhood on the east. Other parts of this project included a 300-foot iron bridge crossing the Northern Pacific Railway, a long embankment, and a stone-arch sewer for the crossing of Phalen Creek. These improvements were necessary because the hill on Seventh Street needed to be rebuilt to lessen its steepness, so streetcars could travel between downtown and the Dayton's Bluff neighborhood. The Seventh Street Improvement Arches bridge posed a special engineering challenge because the street crossed the St. Paul and Duluth tracks at a 63-degree angle. The bridge also had to carry sewer and water pipes and match the rest of the profile of the regraded hill, making a substantial amount of fill necessary. This precluded the construction of a bridge with ribbed arches, because this method could not support all the weight of the fill. Truesdell also considered using the classical French method of skewed arch construction, but the amount of skilled stonecutting necessary would have made the cost prohibitive. He turned to the helicoidal or spiral method, introduced by British architect Peter Nicholson in 1828. This method was mathematically rigorous, but since Truesdell studied mathematics as a hobby, he decided to accept the challenge. The voussoir stones were cut with curved surfaces to form a series of parallel spiral courses. The initial calculation of the curves was difficult, but once the calculation was performed, all of the voussoirs (except for the ring stones) could be cut from the same pattern. This required the stonecutters to work with more precision than they were used to, but a skilled foreman helped to organize the work. The abutments, piers, and wing walls were built with a variety of gray limestone locally quarried in St. Paul, while the voussoirs, ring stones, coping and spandrel walls were built with a buff-colored limestone quarried in Kasota, Minnesota.

Construction on the bridge began in September 1883, with Michael O'Brien of St. Paul doing general contracting for excavation, foundation, and abutments. McArthur Brothers of Chicago was responsible for the final construction of the bridge, which opened for traffic on December 18, 1884. Truesdell's engineering colleagues recognized his achievements, even if the general public soon forgot the significance of the bridge. The Association of Engineering Societies Journal characterized the bridge as "the most important piece of masonry in the city" upon his death in 1909.

The railroad tracks have since been removed, but the bridge still stands. Today, the Bruce Vento Regional Trail follows the former railroad line under the bridge.

== Gallery ==
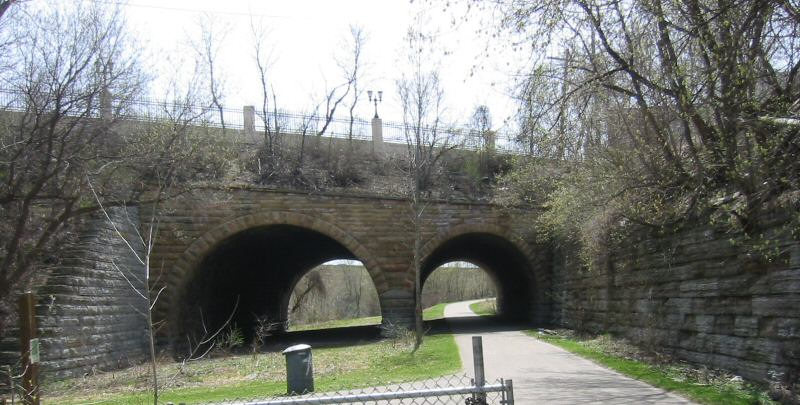
North elevation

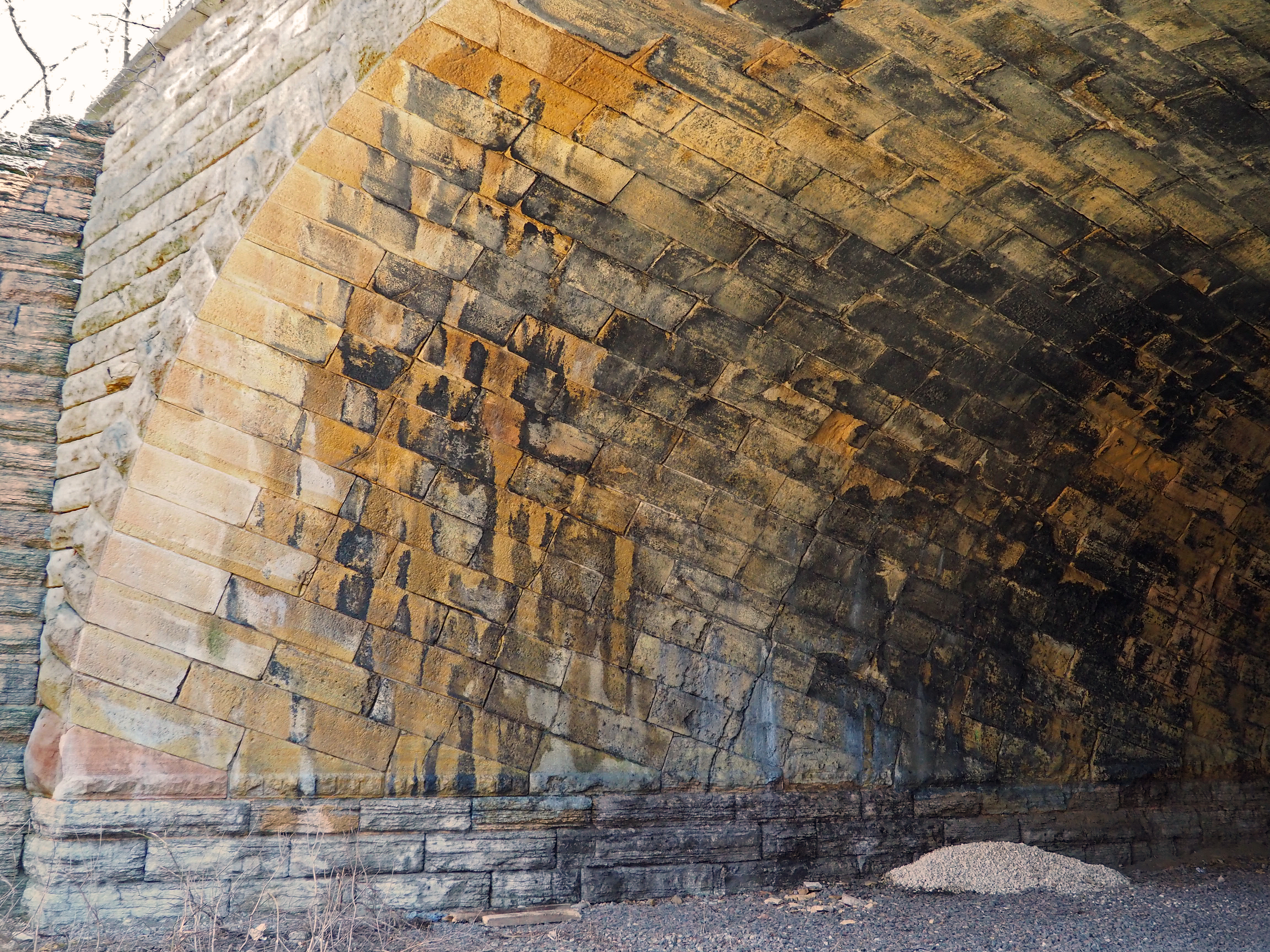
Detail of the ring stones and the entrance to the east arch

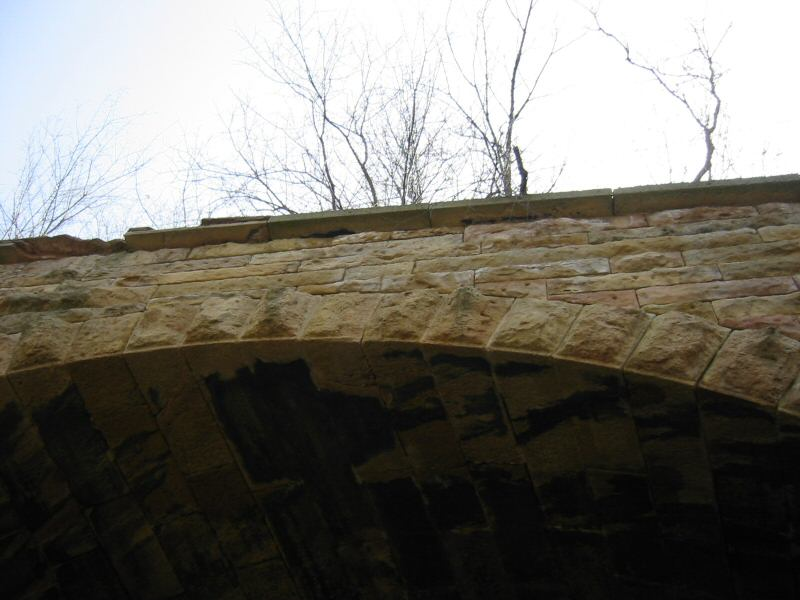
Detail of the ring stones at the top of one of the arches

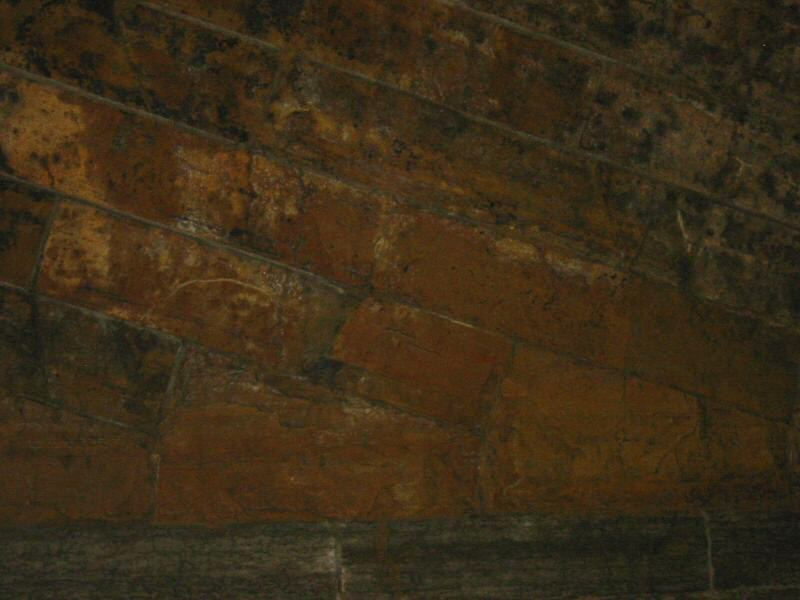
Interior view of the helicoidal construction. The gray stonework at the bottom is the horizontal pier on which the arches sit.

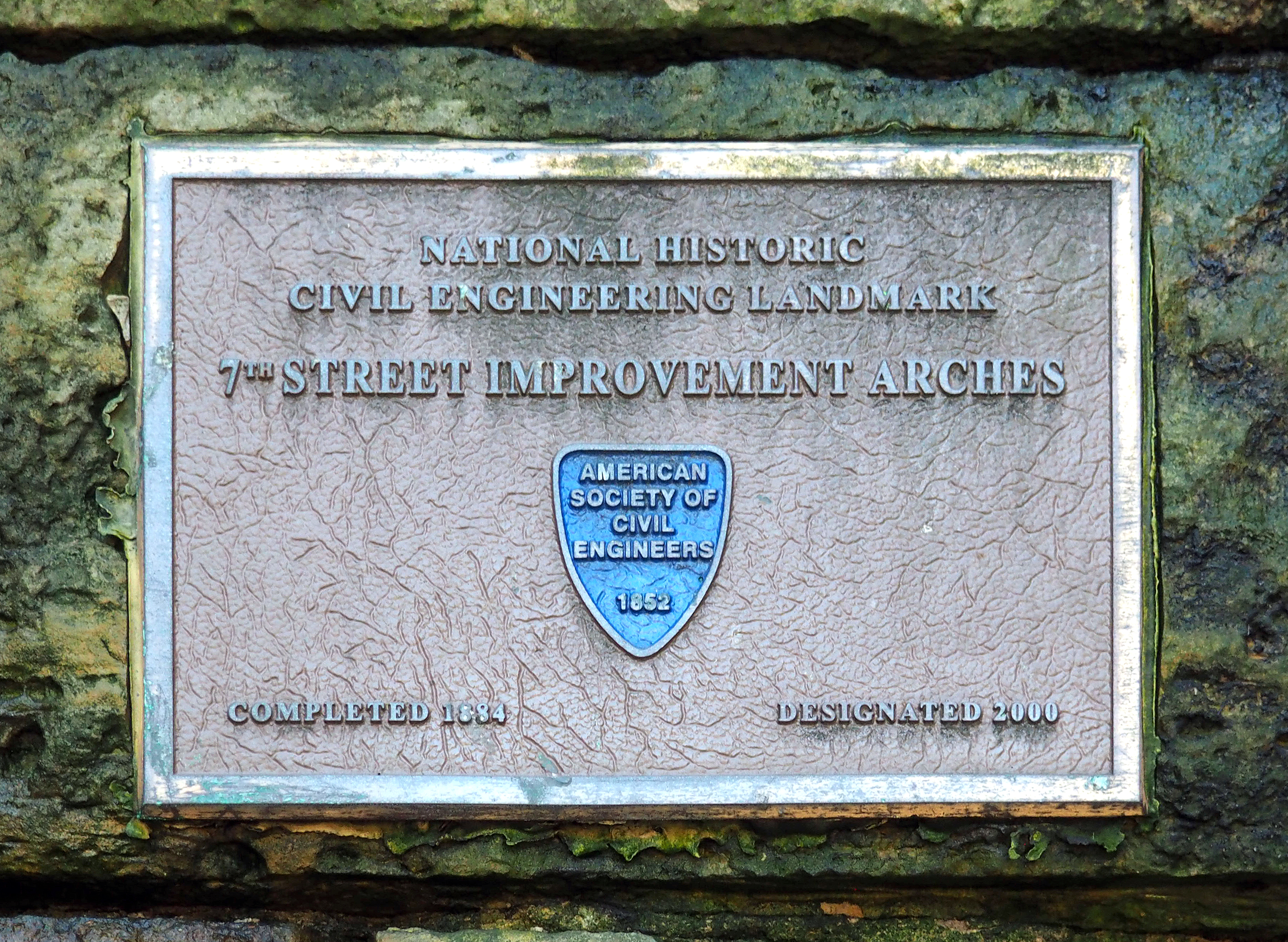
The bridge's National Historic Civil Engineering Landmark plaque
