= Seán Ó Súilleabháin =

Irish folklorist

- Born: 30 November 1903; County Kerry, Ireland
- Died: 13 December 1996 (aged 93)
- Resting place: Shanagangan Cemetery, County Dublin, Ireland
- Education: St Brendan's College, Killarney; De La Salle College Waterford; University College London
- Alma mater: University College London; National University of Ireland
- Occupations: Folklorist, Teacher
- Employers: Irish Folklore Commission; University College Dublin
- Known for: Archivist with the Irish Folklore Commission
- Spouse: Mairin Sheehy
- Children: One son and one daughter
- Awards: Honorary DLittCelt from the National University of Ireland (1976)

Seán Ó Súilleabháin (30 November 1903 – 13 December 1996) was a teacher and folklorist with the Irish Folklore Commission. He was a native Irish speaker from County Kerry.

Educated at St Brendan's College, Killarney, he trained as a national school teacher from 1921 to 1923 at De La Salle College Waterford. He worked as a teacher in County Kilkenny and Mount Sion, Waterford. In 1934, he earned an external BA in Celtic Studies from University College London, followed by an MA. In 1935, he became the first archivist with the Irish Folklore Commission, which had been established, and received training at Uppsala University in Sweden. Following the commission's closure, he worked as a lecturer at University College Dublin. He was awarded an honorary DLittCelt from the National University of Ireland in 1976.

== Personal life ==
He married Mairin Sheehy, and had a son and daughter. He died on 13 December 1996, and is buried in Shanganagh Cemetery, County Dublin.
