= Graceville, Minnesota =

City in Minnesota, United States

Graceville
- City
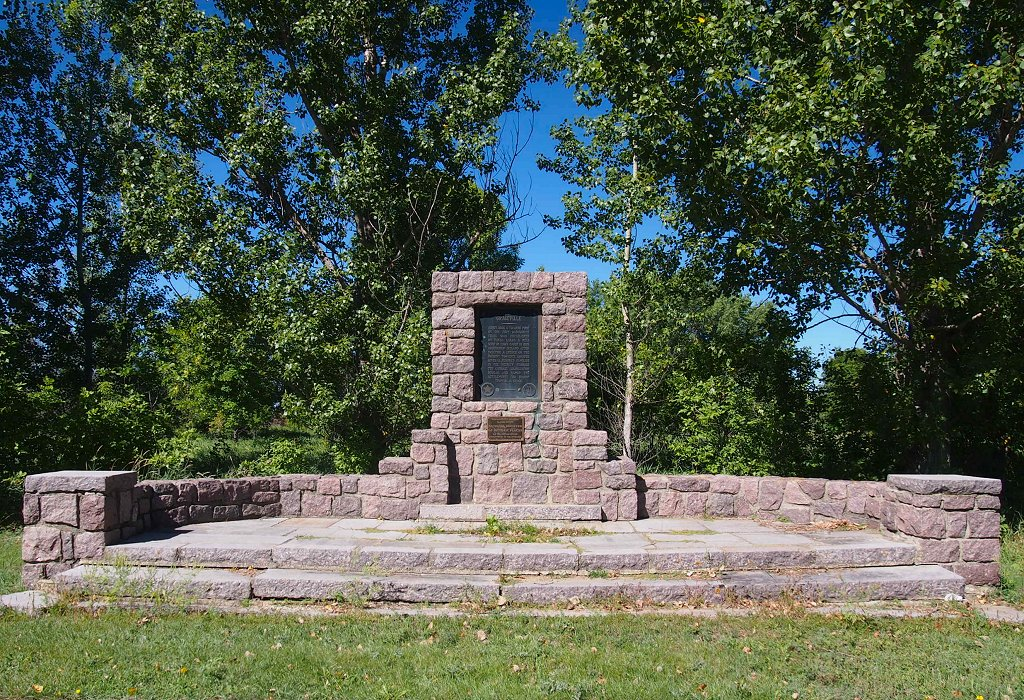
- Graceville Historical Marker

- Location of Graceville, Minnesota
- Coordinates: 45°34′07″N 96°26′14″W
- Country: United States
- State: Minnesota
- County: Big Stone

Area
  - Total: 0.58 sq mi (1.50 km^{2})
  - Land: 0.58 sq mi (1.50 km^{2})
  - Water: 0 sq mi (0.00 km^{2})
- Elevation: 1,109 ft (338 m)

Population (2020)
  - Total: 529
  - Density: 913.4/sq mi (352.65/km^{2})
- Time zone: UTC-6 (Central (CST))
  - Summer (DST): UTC-5 (CDT)
- ZIP code: 56240
- Area code: 320
- FIPS code: 27-24758
- GNIS feature ID: 2394940

Graceville is a city in Big Stone County, Minnesota, United States. The population was 529 at the 2020 census.

== History ==
Graceville was founded in the 1870s by a colony of Catholics and named for Thomas Langdon Grace, the second Roman Catholic Bishop of Saint Paul, Minnesota.

Covenant of our Lady of the Lake was a Native American residential school that operated in Graceville and opened in 1885. The school held Native American girls from Sisseton, South Dakota. In 1896, the US government withdrew its funding of the school and the students were sent back to Sisseton. The building was used as a school for students from the Graceville area for two years until it burned down in 1898.

== Geography ==
According to the United States Census Bureau, the city has an area of 0.58 square miles (1.50 km^{2}), all land.

US 75 and MN 28 are the two major highways that run through the community. The town's main street is Studdart Avenue. The town is on the northeast corner of Toqua Lake, a recreational lake surrounded by two campgrounds, a golf course, and a shooting club.

Graceville is in a natural area called a wet prairie, which is a mix of prairie land, swamp and numerous small lakes and ponds.

== Demographics ==
Historical population
Census	Pop.	Note	%±
1880	40		—
1890	508		1,170.0%
1900	856		68.5%
1910	987		15.3%
1920	1,022		3.5%
1930	969		−5.2%
1940	1,020		5.3%
1950	962		−5.7%
1960	823		−14.4%
1970	735		−10.7%
1980	780		6.1%
1990	671		−14.0%
2000	605		−9.8%
2010	577		−4.6%
2020	529		−8.3%
U.S. Decennial Census; 2020 Census

=== 2010 census ===
As of the census of 2010, there were 577 people, 263 households, and 135 families residing in the city. The population density was 994.8 inhabitants per square mile (384.1/km^{2}). There were 305 housing units at an average density of 525.9 per square mile (203.1/km^{2}). The racial makeup of the city was 99.8% White and 0.2% Asian. Hispanic or Latino of any race were 0.7% of the population.

There were 263 households, of which 19.0% had children under the age of 18 living with them, 46.8% were married couples living together, 1.5% had a female householder with no husband present, 3.0% had a male householder with no wife present, and 48.7% were non-families. 44.5% of all households were made up of individuals, and 25.9% had someone living alone who was 65 years of age or older. The average household size was 2.01 and the average family size was 2.80.

The median age in the city was 52.2 years. 17% of residents were under the age of 18; 5.5% were between the ages of 18 and 24; 15.8% were from 25 to 44; 26.6% were from 45 to 64; and 35% were 65 years of age or older. The gender makeup of the city was 45.9% male and 54.1% female.

=== 2000 census ===
At the 2000 census, there were 605 people, 257 households and 149 families residing in the city. The population density was 1,007.7 inhabitants per square mile (389.1/km^{2}). There were 283 housing units at an average density of 471.4 per square mile (182.0/km^{2}). The racial makeup of the city was 99.50% White, 0.17% Native American, 0.17% Asian, and 0.17% from two or more races. Hispanic or Latino of any race were 0.17% of the population.

There were 257 households, of which 26.8% had children under the age of 18 living with them, 51.4% were married couples living together, 5.1% had a female householder with no husband present, and 42.0% were non-families. 39.7% of all households were made up of individuals, and 22.2% had someone living alone who was 65 years of age or older. The average household size was 2.15 and the average family size was 2.92.

Age distribution was 22.3% under the age of 18, 5.1% from 18 to 24, 21.8% from 25 to 44, 18.2% from 45 to 64, and 32.6% who were 65 years of age or older. The median age was 46 years. For every 100 females, there were 80.1 males. For every 100 females age 18 and over, there were 74.7 males.

The median household income was $27,143, and the median family income was $35,385. Males had a median income of $27,031 versus $21,250 for females. The per capita income for the city was $15,451. About 3.9% of families and 8.6% of the population were below the poverty line, including 10.7% of those under age 18 and 12.1% of those age 65 or over.

== Politics ==
Presidential election results 1960–2020

Precinct General Election Results
Year	Republican	Democratic	Third parties
2020	67.8% 227	31.3% 105	0.9% 3
2016	57.5% 195	34.5% 117	8.0% 27
2012	45.4% 148	52.8% 172	1.8% 6
2008	45.3% 153	53.0% 179	1.7% 6
2004	42.1% 143	56.8% 193	1.1% 4
2000	42.0% 142	49.1% 166	8.9% 30
1996	26.1% 89	63.1% 215	10.8% 37
1992	29.8% 108	49.6% 180	20.6% 75
1988	29.3% 119	70.7% 287	0.0% 0
1984	39.4% 163	60.6% 251	0.0% 0
1980	39.2% 191	53.6% 261	7.2% 35
1976	26.2% 102	70.5% 275	3.3% 13
1972	32.2% 126	66.0% 258	1.8% 7
1968	30.2% 117	65.6% 254	4.2% 16
1964	22.3% 88	77.7% 306	0.0% 0
1960	26.1% 109	73.6% 307	0.3% 1

== Arts and culture ==
=== Toquatennial Days ===
In an effort to promote tourism, the Graceville Civic Group began Toquatennial Days on the first weekend of July in 1988, the 110th anniversary of the town's founding. Events included the crowning of "Miss Toquatennial" (entrants limited to women who would be seniors at the high school), a "Medallion Hunt", softball tournament, Sunday evening ice cream social and drag competition (an apparent parody of past Miss Toquatennials), two street dances (a free "kiddie" dance on Friday night, and the Graceville Volunteer Fire Department Fundraiser dance on Saturday night), and the Saturday morning "Graceville Gallop", a six-kilometer walk/run that circles Toqua Lake. The events culminated with a fireworks display at dusk on Sunday evening over Toqua Lake. Events continued to be held annually on the first weekend of July or last weekend of June until the Civic Group disbanded in 1998, but several local businesses and the Volunteer Fire Department have independently kept many of the events going every year, including the addition of a 3-on-3 basketball tournament and fire department "water fights".

== Education ==
Graceville is part of the Clinton-Graceville-Beardsley School District (Independent School District 2888). It is an elementary and high school conglomerate consisting of rural schools in Big Stone County, which united in 1994. The school mascot is the Wolverine and the school newspaper is the "Paw Press." The high school is in Graceville and the elementary school in nearby Clinton.

Clinton-Graceville-Beardsley High School earned the Minnesota State High School League Championship in 9-man football, played at the H.H.H. Metrodome on November 13, 2012. In 2009, C-G-B High School competed in the semifinal game against Stephen-Argyle School District, losing 18–21. C-G-B sports compete in the Pheasant Conference of the Minnesota State High School League.

== Notable people ==
- Charles A. Berg, farmer and politician
- Congresswoman Madeleine Bordallo.
- Irish language storyteller Éamon a Búrc (1866–1942) was a resident in the early years of settlement.
- Birthplace of Jack Conway Director, producer and actor from the first half of the 20th century.
- Arthur Willard Davis (born June 6, 1942 in Graceville), Major League Baseball first baseman
- Todd Hendricks (born August 13, 1968 in Graceville) is a former professional football player.
- Birthplace of former Minnesota Twins baseball manager Tom Kelly
- Maureen Owen (born July 6, 1943, in Graceville), poet, editor, and biographer
- Birthplace of Charles "Charlie" Ryan Singer and songwriter, best known "Hot Rod Lincoln".
- Robert Ernest Strand, farmer and politician
