= Séamus Ó Duilearga =

Irish folklorist (1899–1980)

Séamus Ó Duilearga (born James Hamilton Delargy; 26 May 1899 – 25 June 1980) was an Irish folklorist, professor of folklore at University College Dublin and Director of the Irish Folklore Commission.

Born in Cushendall, Co Antrim, he was one of two sons of James Delargy and Mary Josephine McQuillan. Following the death of James Delargy the family moved to Glenariff, Co Antrim and later to Co Wicklow.

Graduating with a degree in Celtic Studies from University College Dublin, he founded the Folklore of Ireland Society in 1926 and was involved with the foundation of its magazine 'Béaloideas' the following year. He would remain its editor until his retirement.

In 1930 the Society became the Irish Folklore Institute and received a government grant, and in 1935 the Irish Folklore Commission (Coimisiún Béaloideasa Éireann) was established in University College Dublin by the first Fianna Fáil government. Ó Duilearga was appointed director and Seán Ó Súilleabháin (1903-1996) a Kerryman, was the appointed archivist.

The Commission operated under the aegis of the Department of Education, and aimed to collect, preserve and classify all aspects of Irish folk tradition in a systematic manner. One of its first projects was the Schools’ Collection Scheme 1937, which was a voluntary nationwide attempt to rescue 'from oblivion the traditions…of the historic Irish nation.’ Operated through the National Schools system, it resulted in a collection of about a half a million manuscript pages of folklore, now housed in the Department of Irish Folklore at University College Dublin.

Ó Duilearga was appointed lecturer in Irish in UCD in 1923, and later that year he was visiting Seán Ó Conaill in Kildreelig, south-west Kerry, when he encountered the Swedish folklorist Carl Wilhelm von Sydow. He subsequently negotiated a sabbatical from UCD to study folklore in Lund and Uppsala.

He was made lecturer in folklore in UCD in 1934, and Professor of Folklore in 1946, while continuing to serve as Director of the Folklore Commission. He edited Oidhche Sheanchais (1935), the first Irish language sync sound film.

In the early 1960s, he collaborated with Anthony T. Lucas, the director of the National Museum of Ireland (NMI), to create and circulate a questionnaire on the uses of hay, rushes, and straw. It was sent to 150 people, and from the results, Lucas embarked on an extensive collecting programme in the NMI for objects made of these materials.

He resigned his UCD chair in 1969, retired from the Commission in 1971, and died in Dublin in 1980.

Ó Duilearga was married to Maud McGuigan; they had one son and one daughter.

== Selected publications ==
- Irish folk tales, (edited with introduction and notes) 1942
- The Gaelic Storyteller, 1945
- Leabhar Sheáin Í Chonaill, 1948
- Seanchas ón Oileán Tiar, (folk history recorded by Robin Flower from Tomás Ó Criomhthain) 1956
