= Lake Phalen =

Lake in the state of Minnesota, United States

Phalen Lake
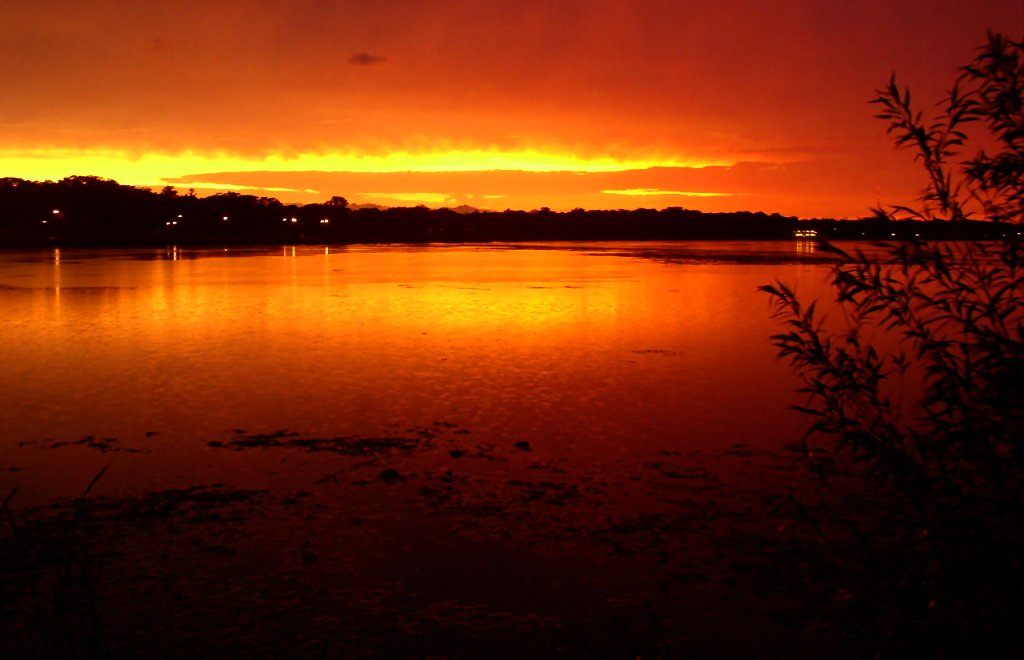

- Location within Minnesota Location within the United States
- Location: St. Paul / Maplewood, Minnesota, United States
- Coordinates: 44°59′N 93°03′W
- Primary outflows: Phalen Creek
- Basin countries: United States
- Surface area: 198 acres (0.80 km^{2})
- Average depth: 24 feet (7 m)
- Max. depth: 91 feet (28 m)
- Shore length^{1}: 3 miles (5 km)
- Surface elevation: 860 feet (262 m)
- ^{1} Shore length is not a well-defined measure.

Lake Phalen is an urban lake located in Saint Paul, Minnesota and in its suburb of Maplewood. It is one of the largest lakes in Saint Paul and is the centerpiece of the Phalen Regional Park System. The lake drains into the Mississippi River after traveling through Phalen Creek. The lake and surrounding 494-acre (2.00 km^{2}) park receive around 500,000 visitors each year.

== Lake ==
Lake Phalen is one of the Twin Cities' most popular fishing lakes. The lake is stocked with walleye every other year and tiger muskies every three years. The lake also has northern pike, largemouth bass, crappie and sunfish that are able to maintain population levels naturally. The lake has a 23-square-mile (60 km^{2}) watershed. The lake is also home to an unusual fish: the rainbow darter. First found in 1996 by workers from the Minnesota Department of Natural Resources, the fish normally lives in fast moving streams. The fish is only found in six to eight other streams in Minnesota. Eurasian watermilfoil, an invasive plant to Minnesota, was first discovered in the lake in 1997 and continues to grow in the lake.

=== Boating ===
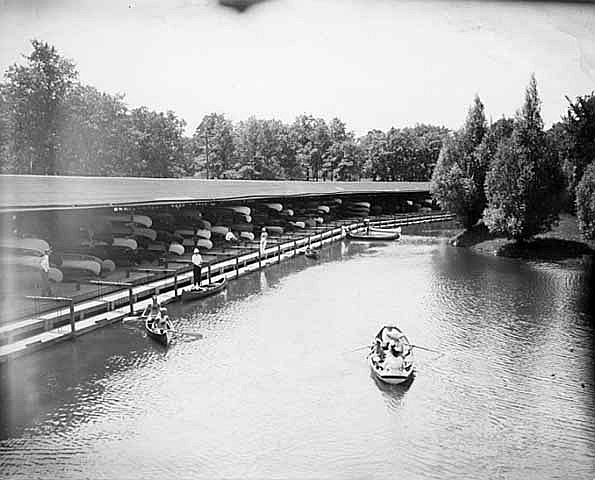
Canoe docks on the shore of Lake Phalen

The lake has always had sailing and boating. In the 1890s sailing was very popular. In 1919, 880 canoes were stored onshore. Now the Saint Paul Sailing Club has space to moor 50 boats on the lake. In addition the lake hosts College rowing competitions on a 1,940-meter course. The University of Minnesota holds several meets a year at Lake Phalen. The first competition to be held was in the spring of 2003 after the U of M elevated rowing to a Varsity Sport in 2000. In 2006, the Big Ten Championships were held at Lake Phalen. Currently gas powered motors are not allowed on the lake. Electrical trolling motors however are allowed.

== History ==
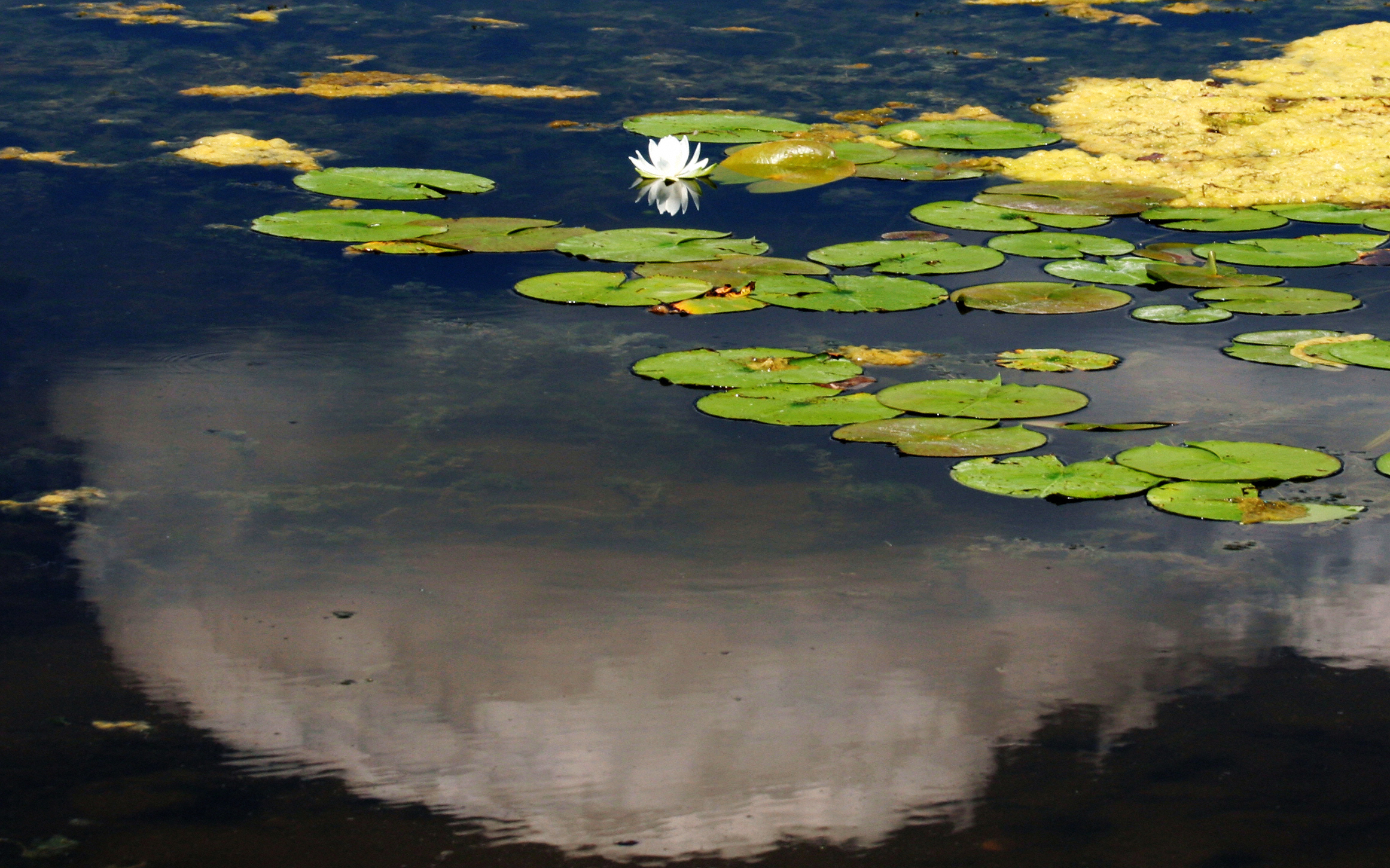
Cloud and water lily

Lake Phalen was named after an early Irish settler of Saint Paul, Edward Phelan. Phalen built a cabin near Phalen Creek in Swede Hollow. Phalen Creek travels from Lake Phalen and drains into the Mississippi River just north of Lambert's Landing. The lake that was drained by the creek became known as Phalen's Lake despite Phelan never living near its shores. The Saint Paul Water Company set up a supply plant at Lake Phalen in 1869 and the lake was used as Saint Paul's primary source of water until 1913. John Fletcher Williams, a local historian, wrote in 1876 "It is a disgrace, that the name of this brutal murderer has been affixed to one of our most beautiful lakes - one that supplies our households with water." Phalen had been accused of murdering his partner, John Hays in 1839, however another man later confessed to Hays' murder.

Soon after the park was acquired, in 1899, the Saint Paul Board of Park Commissioners attempted to "tame" the lake shore. Emergent vegetation and other plants, such as bulrush, grew all around the lake shore. The lake shore became almost constantly dredged and wetland areas around the lake were filled in to create lawn space. Eventually 400,000 cubic yards (305,822 m^{3}) of vegetation and sediment was dredged from around the lake shore. In the 1920s, 50 percent of the shoreline was lined with riprap. Beginning in 1906 with a herd of sheep, the lawn space next to the lake was cut right up to the lake shore. As a result of these practices shoreline erosion became a problem. In 2001, the lake began a five-year shoreline restoration program. The program converted a majority of the riprap to natural vegetation. The percentage natural vegetation around the lake changed from 28 percent to 74 percent.

== Park ==
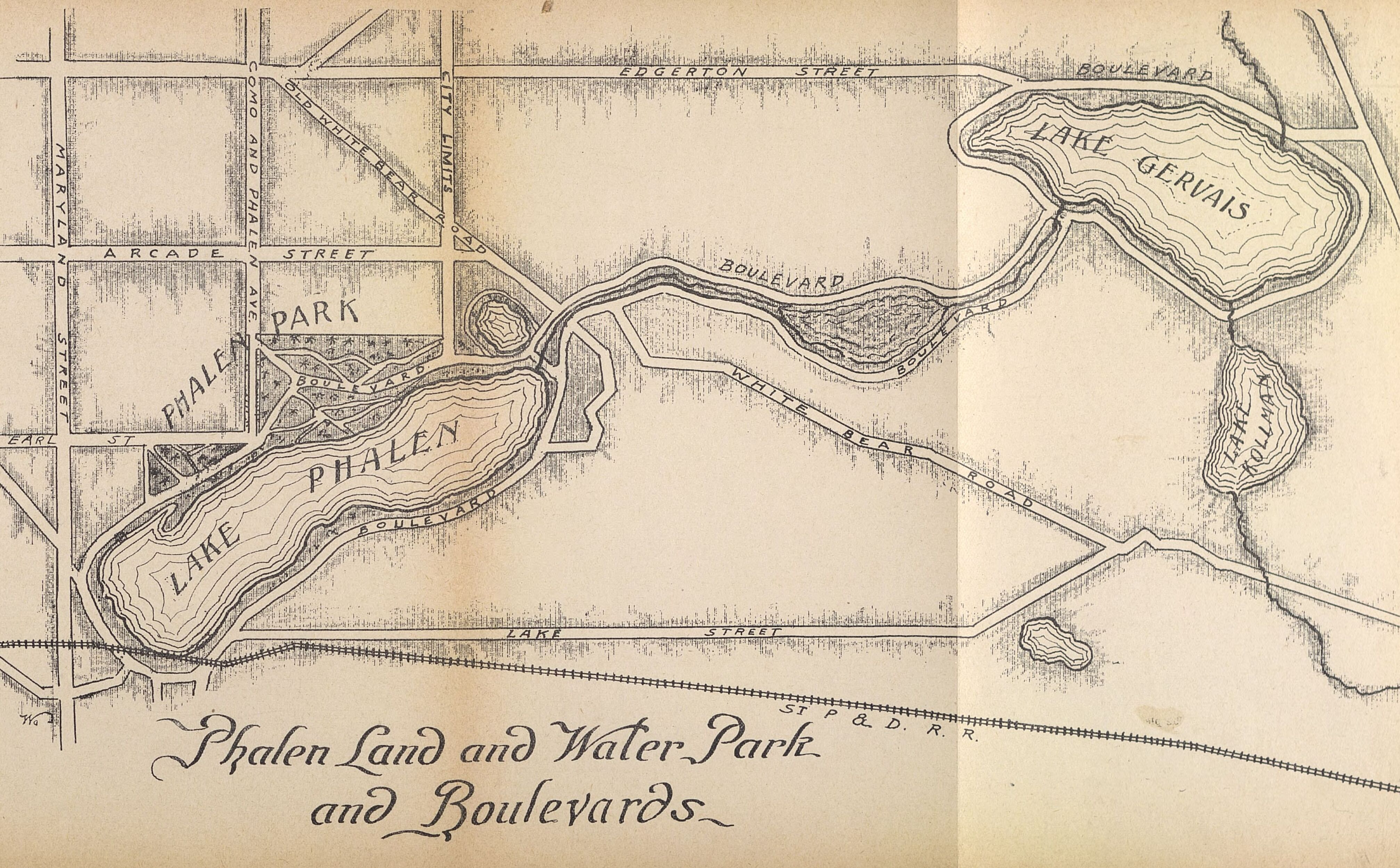
Drawing of Lake Phalen and surrounding area ca 1895

The city of Saint Paul acquired the lake and surrounding area in 1899 for $22,000. The area surrounding the lake has been made into a 494-acre (2.00 km^{2}) park. The park has the only swimming lake in Saint Paul. An 18-hole golf course is also located in the park. A Chinese garden is being developed with St. Paul's sister city, Changsha, China. Phalen Park is a sister to that city's Yanghu Wetland's Park. A replica of the latter's pavilion is being sent in exchange for five Peanuts statues. Along the west side of the shoreline is a monument that the Civilian Conservation Corps built to commemorate their work in improving the park.

== Phalen Creek ==
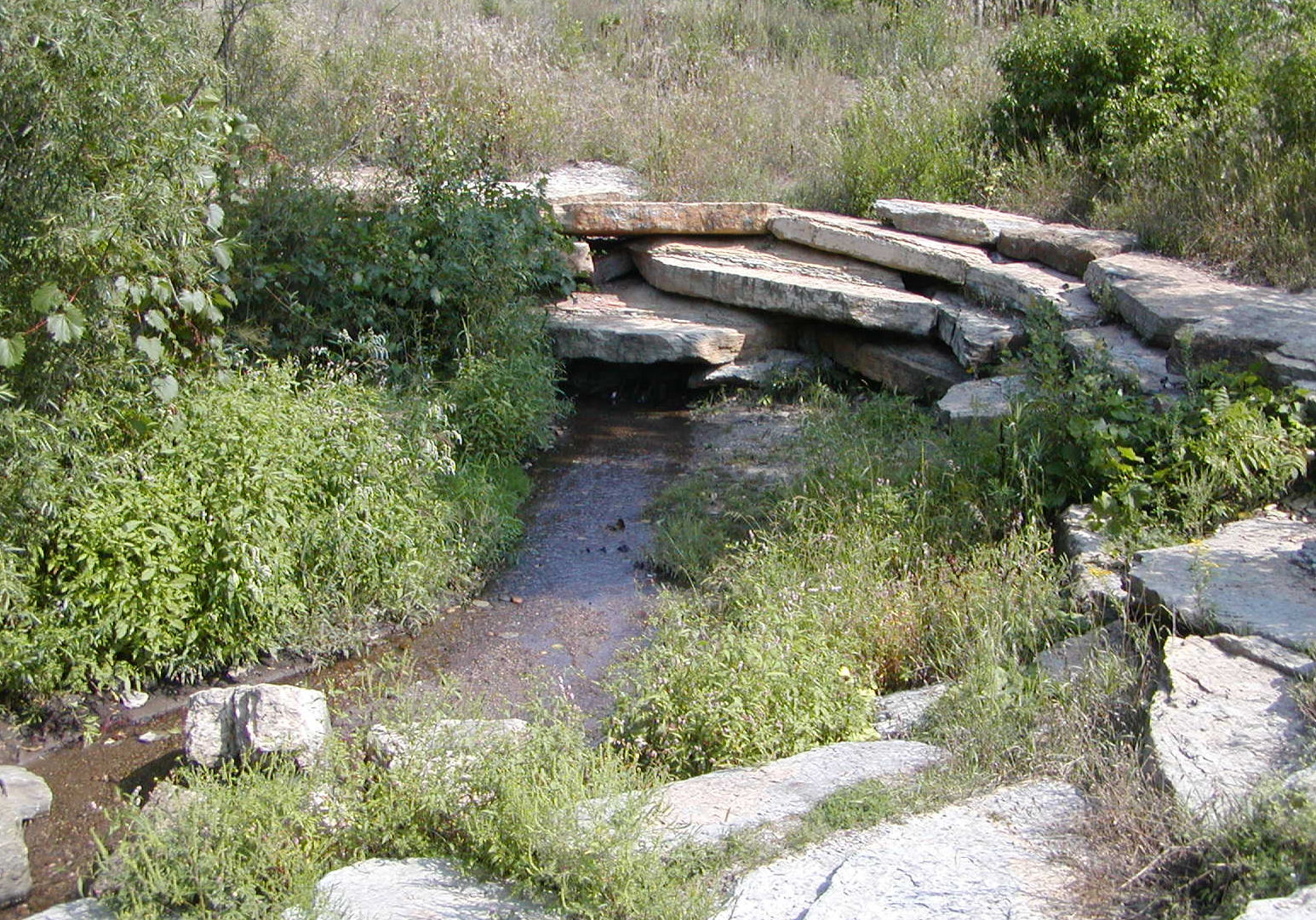
Phalen Creek in Swede Hollow

Phalen Creek drains the lake and flows into the Mississippi River. Near the turn of the 20th century most of the creek was covered over and routed through sewers. Since then, there have been several attempts to completely uncover it. A portion of the lower creek is uncovered and runs along the Bruce Vento Regional Trail. In 2026, a nonprofit organization, Waḳaƞ Ṭípi Awaƞyaƞkapi, received a close to $2 million grant from the Minnesota Pollution Control Agency and the Minnesota Department of Natural Resources to daylight some portions of Phalen Creek. The organization plans to complete the first phase of creek restoration in 2027.

== PLAN Phalen Lake Association of Neighbors ==
PLAN was founded in 2009 with its stated mission to, "Advocate for and preserve the quality of life of neighborhoods around Phalen lake." The organization consists of people living in and around the Phalen Lake area. The association has no public or private funding, and all of its administrators donate their time. PLAN also hosts an online calendar of events for activities focusing on the lake.
