= Bass Rock (disambiguation) =

The Bass Rock, also known as "the Bass", is a distinctive island off the coast of East Lothian, Scotland. Scottish emigrants named three islands in the United States after the Bass Rock:

Bass Rock may also refer to:

== Locations ==
- Bass Rock (Norfolk County, Massachusetts)
- Bass Rock (Greenland), a small island in East Greenland, named for its resemblance to Bass Rock, Scotland
- Bass Rock (Maine), a large boulder set in Webb Lake, Maine

== Albums ==
- Bass Rock (album), an album by Clyde Carson

== Novels ==
- The Bass Rock, 2020 novel by Evie Wyld
