= Tumbledown (disambiguation) =

Tumbledown is a 1988 British television play.

Tumbledown can also refer to:

- the Battle of Mount Tumbledown in the Falklands War in 1982
- Tumbledown Mountain in Maine, USA
- Tumbledown Dick, a nickname given Richard Cromwell, British politician and army officer (1626–1715)
- Mike Herrera's Tumbledown an alternative country band
- "Tumbledown", a song on The Jesus and Mary Chain's Honey's Dead
- Tumbledown (2015 film), a film produced by Bron Studios
