= Bass Rock (Maine) =

Boulder in Webb Lake, Maine, US

- Location within Maine
- Interactive map of Bass Rock
- Location: Weld, Maine, United States
- Coordinates: 44°40′43″N 70°26′23″W
- Administrator: Mount Blue State Park

Bass Rock is a large boulder set in Webb Lake, Maine. Located in Weld, it is about 30 feet long, 25 feet wide, and an unknown height, due to its partial submergence within the surrounding sediments.

== Geologic history ==
Bass Rock is a large metamorphic glacial erratic, made up mostly of schist, but with foliations of other minerals scattered throughout. Though much of Western Maine lacks detailed bedrock maps, it has been hypothesized that the rock was plucked from the Tumbledown Mountain area and deposited to its current location sometime during the last glacial period.

== History ==
Bass Rock has long been a favorite spot for paddlers and swimmers due to its easy accessibility. It is the site of the annual Bass Rock Walk, held by Camp Kawanhee, a local boys camp, every year on the Sunday immediately preceding President's Day in February.

== Location ==
Bass Rock is located 600 feet offshore of Webb Beach in Webb Lake, Weld, Maine. It is within the boundaries of Mount Blue State Park.

== See also ==
- List of individual rocks
