= 14th Louisiana Infantry Regiment =

Infantry regiment of the Confederate States Army

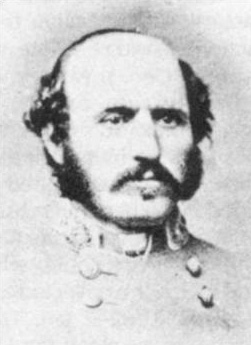
- Colonel Zebulon York was the regiment's third commander. He became a brigadier general.
- Active: 16 June 1861 – 9 April 1865
- Country: Confederate States of America
- Allegiance: Louisiana
- Branch: Confederate States Army
- Type: Infantry
- Size: Regiment
- Part of: 1st Louisiana Brigade (Hays'); 2nd Louisiana Brigade (Nicholls', Stafford's, York's)
- Engagements: American Civil War; Siege of Yorktown (1862); Battle of Williamsburg (1862); Battle of Seven Pines (1862); Battle of Beaver Dam Creek (1862); Battle of Gaines' Mill (1862); Battle of Glendale (1862); Battle of Cedar Mountain (1862); Second Battle of Bull Run (1862); Battle of Antietam (1862); Battle of Fredericksburg (1862); Battle of Chancellorsville (1863); Second Battle of Winchester (1863); Battle of Gettysburg (1863); Battle of Mine Run (1863); Battle of the Wilderness (1864); Battle of Spotsylvania (1864); Battle of Cold Harbor (1864); Battle of Monocacy (1864); Third Battle of Winchester (1864); Battle of Fisher's Hill (1864); Battle of Cedar Creek (1864); Siege of Petersburg (1864–65); Battle of Appomattox (1865)

Commanders
- Notable commanders: Zebulon York

The 14th Louisiana Infantry Regiment was a unit of volunteers recruited in Louisiana that fought in the Confederate States Army during the American Civil War. Formed in June 1861 as the 1st Regiment, Polish Brigade, the unit was later accepted into Confederate service as the 13th Regiment. After being sent to fight in the Eastern Theater of the American Civil War, it was renamed the 14th Regiment. In 1862, it fought at Yorktown, Williamsburg, Seven Pines, Beaver Dam Creek, Gaines' Mill and Glendale. At Glendale, the unit suffered a severe number of casualties and, thereafter, surviving members of the regiment dubbed the battle "the Slaughterhouse."

After being assigned to the 1st Louisiana Brigade, the regiment fought at Cedar Mountain, Second Bull Run, and Antietam. It transferred to the 2nd Louisiana Brigade and served at Fredericksburg, Chancellorsville, Second Winchester, Gettysburg, Mine Run and the Wilderness. At Spotsylvania most of the regiment's soldiers were captured. Its remains fought at Cold Harbor, Monocacy, Third Winchester, Fisher's Hill, Cedar Creek, and Petersburg in 1864. A few survivors surrendered at Appomattox in 1865.

== See also ==
- List of Louisiana Confederate Civil War units
- Louisiana in the Civil War
