= Mount Blue State Park =

State park in Franklin County, Maine

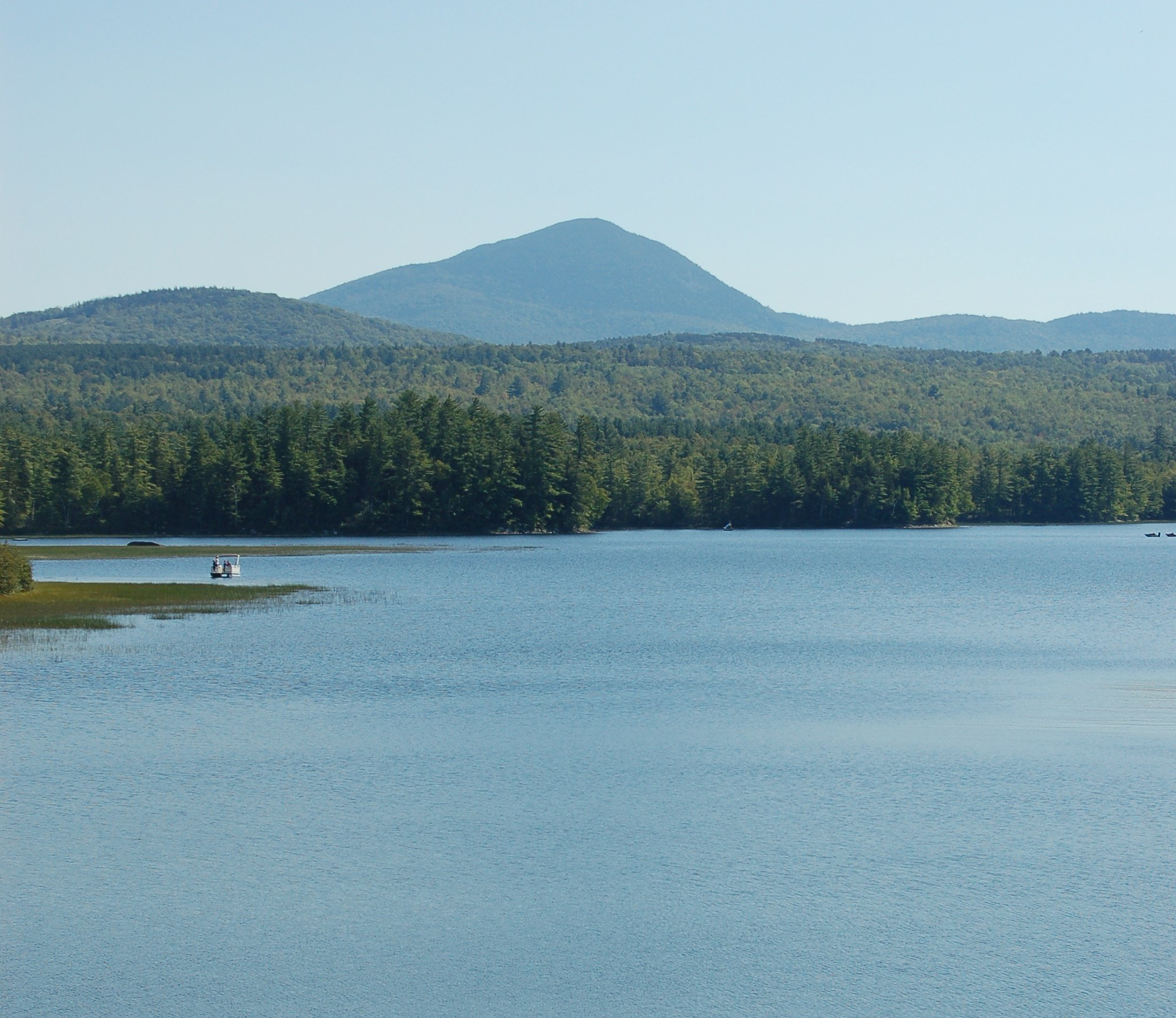
- Webb Lake and Mount Blue

- Location within Maine
- Interactive map of Mount Blue State Park
- Location: Weld, Maine, United States
- Coordinates: 44°43′41″N 70°20′31″W
- Area: 7,489 acres (30.31 km^{2})
- Elevation: 3,183 ft (970 m)
- Established: 1955
- Administrator: Maine Department of Agriculture, Conservation and Forestry
- Website: Official website
- Maine State Parks

Mount Blue State Park is a public recreation area covering 7,489 acres (3,031 ha) in the town of Weld, Franklin County, Maine. The state park's bifurcated land includes acreage on the west shore of Webb Lake as well as Mount Blue and other peaks to the east of the lake. The park is connected by road with the 10,555-acre (4,271 ha) Tumbledown Public Lands, the site of Little Jackson Mountain, Tumbledown Mountain, and Tumbledown Pond, an alpine lake near the top of Tumbledown and Little Jackson mountains. The park and public lands are managed by the Maine Department of Agriculture, Conservation and Forestry.

== History ==
During the 1930s, workers with the Works Progress Administration began developing the area that would become Mount Blue State Park. In the 1940s, there was a proposal for a ski hill on Mount Blue and a winter recreation complex nearby; these were illustrated in an engaging flier but apparently developments did not take place. The state of Maine took possession from the U.S. Department of Agriculture in 1955.

The park saw a 50% increase in size in 2002, when the state purchased 2,468 acres from a subsidiary of McDonald Investment Company for $980,000. The funds used to purchase the land came from the Land for Maine’s Future program, the federal Land and Water Conservation Fund, the Maine Outdoor Heritage Fund and private donations. The land purchased included the 1,298-foot peak known as Hedgehog Hill.

== Wildlife ==
This park is home to mammalian species including moose, squirrels, white-tailed deer, foxes, black bears and coyotes.

== Activities and amenities ==
The park offers a nature center, camping at 136 campsites, swimming area, motorized and non-motorized boating, fishing, and hunting. The extensive trail system is used for hiking, horseback riding, cross-country skiing, snowmobiling, and ATV riding. The park is open year-round.

== See also ==
- Bass Rock, a large boulder within the boundaries of Mount Blue State Park
