= Stillwater, Minnesota =

City in Minnesota, United States

Stillwater
- City
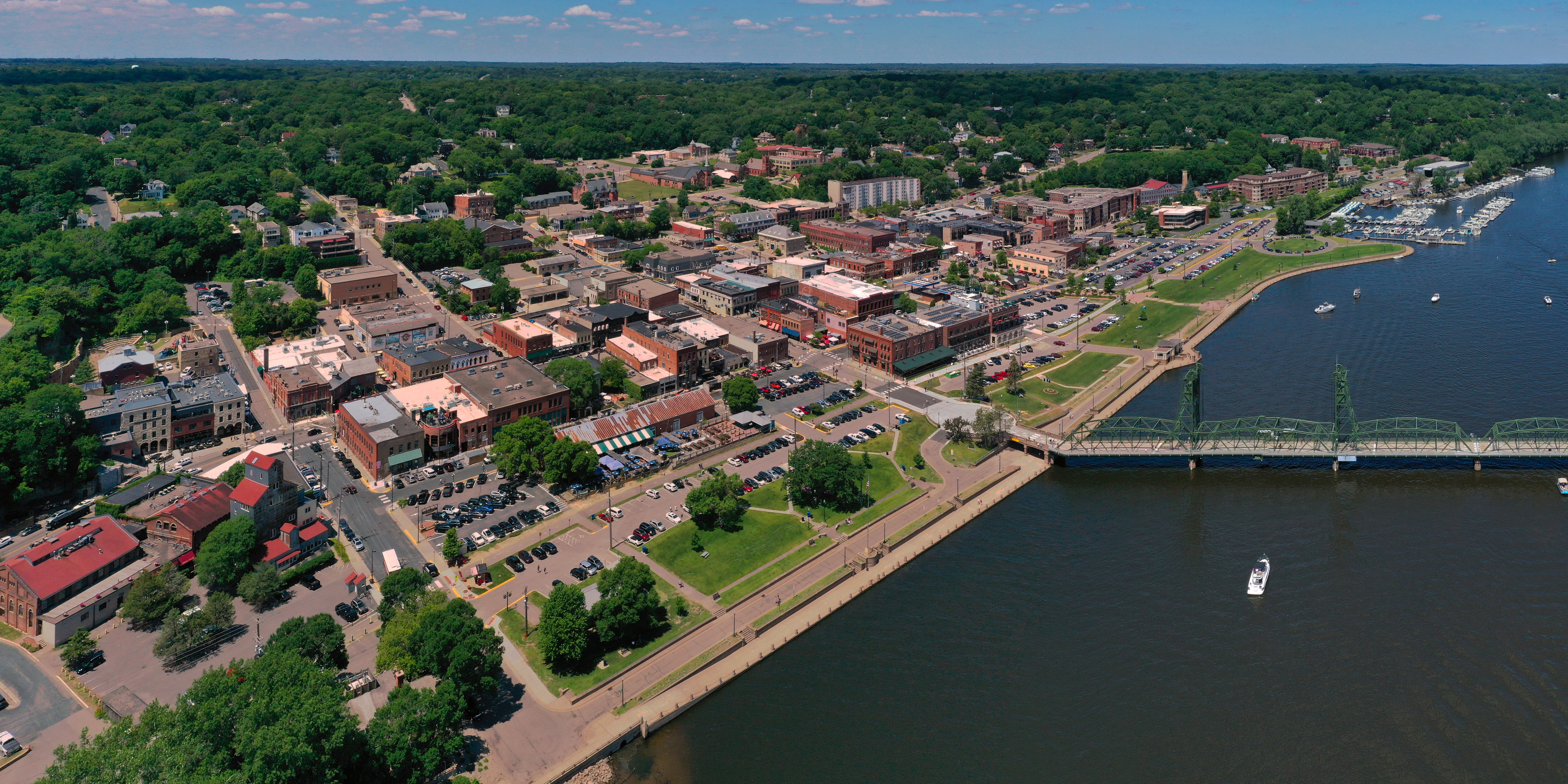
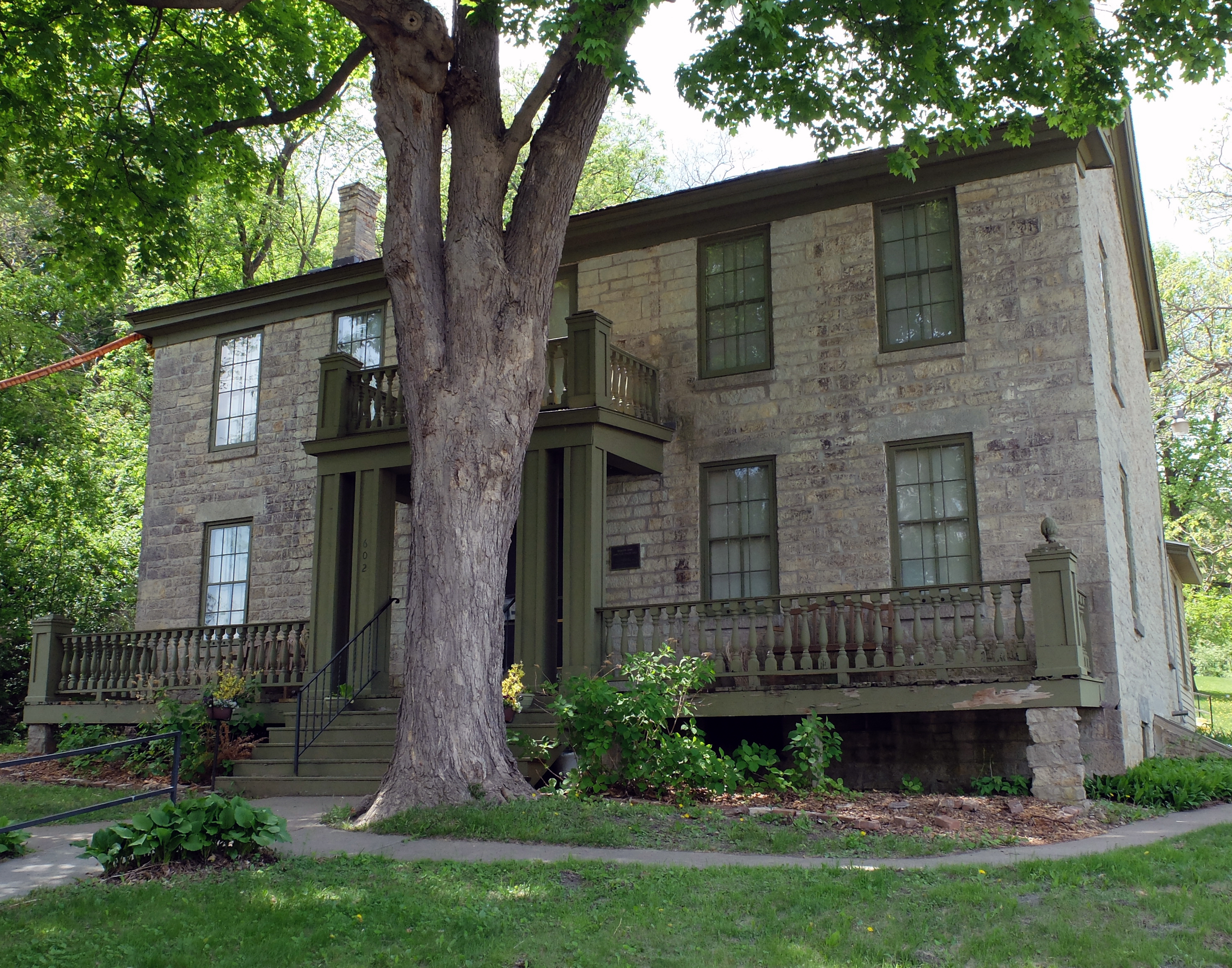
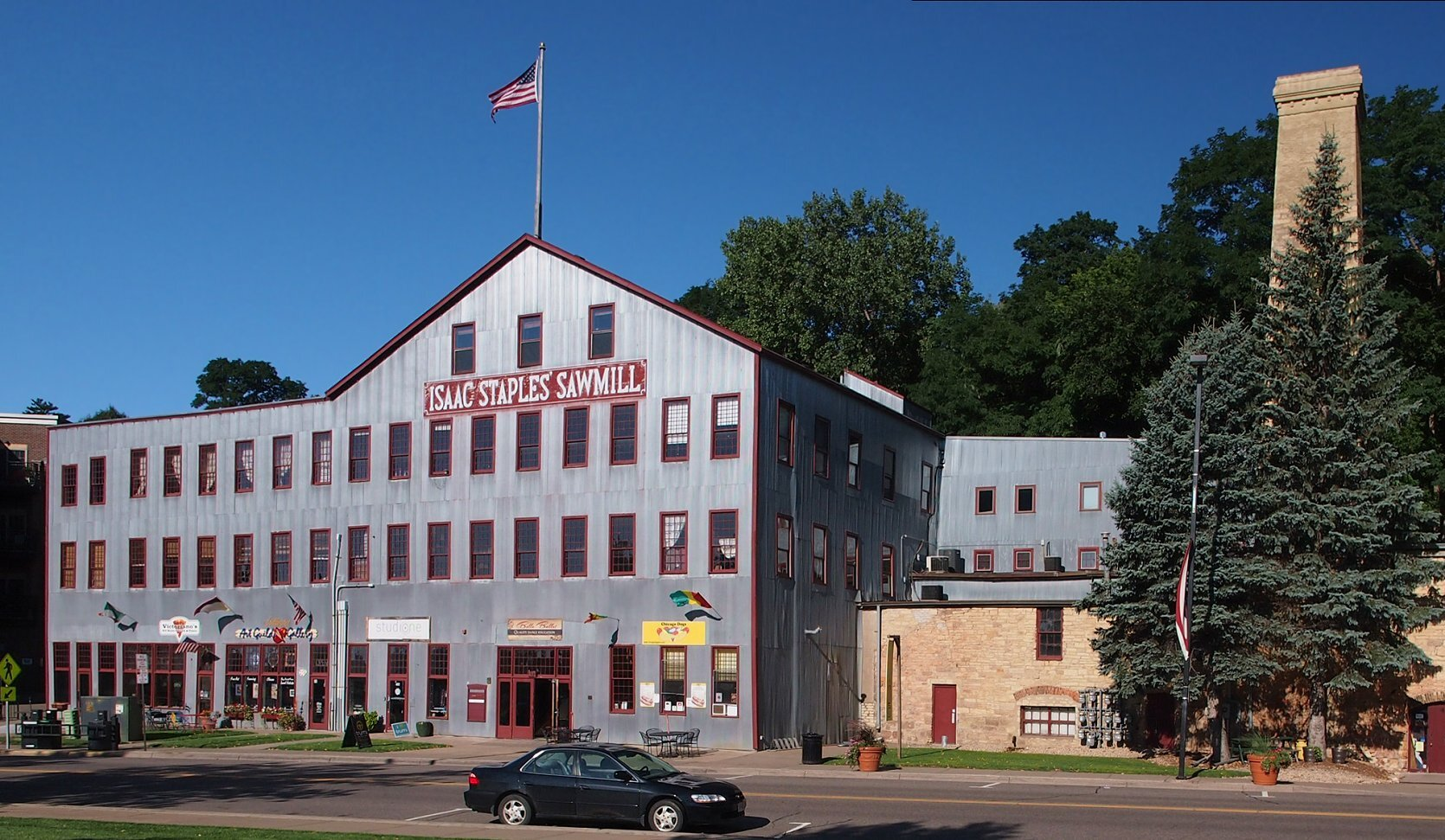
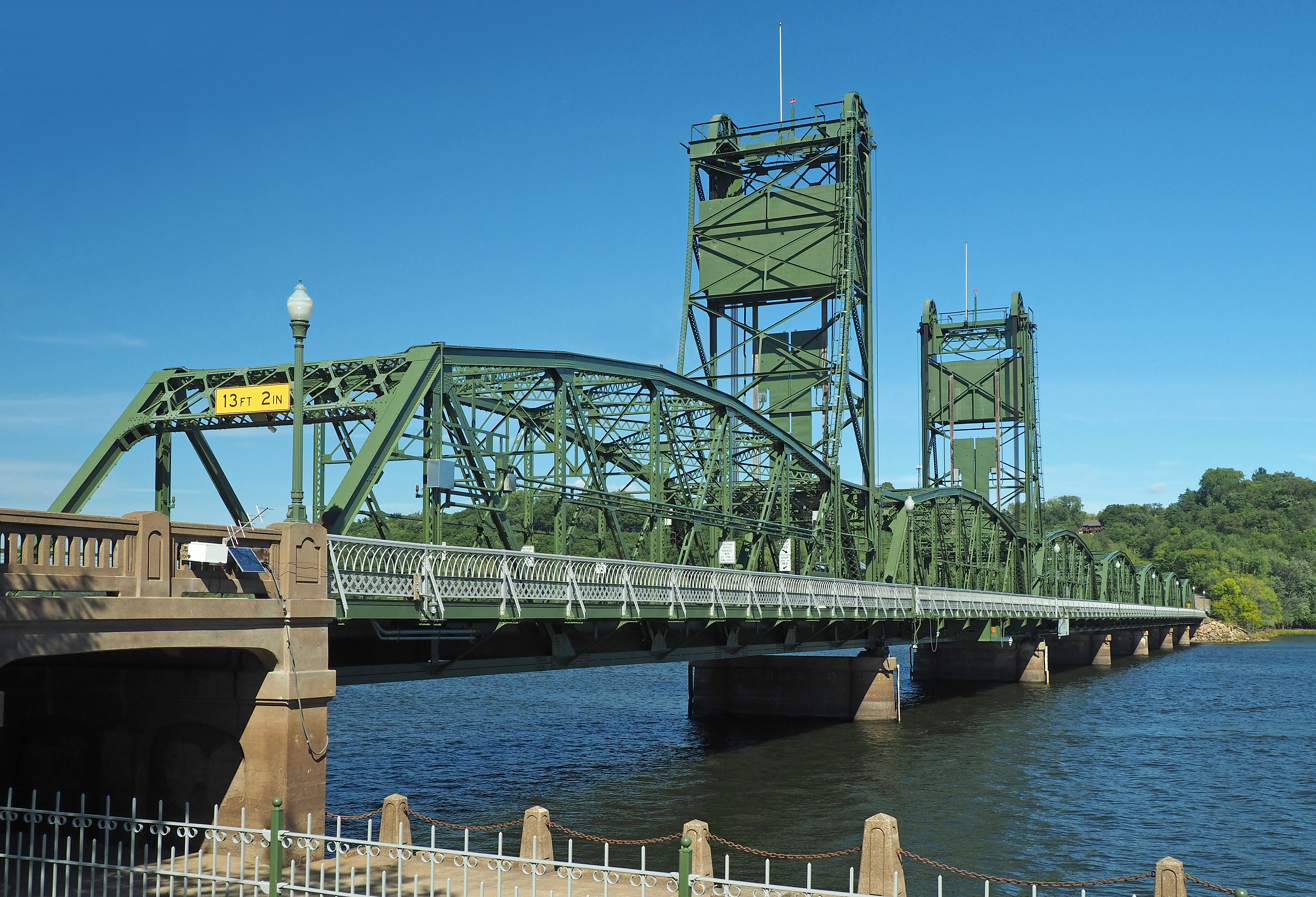
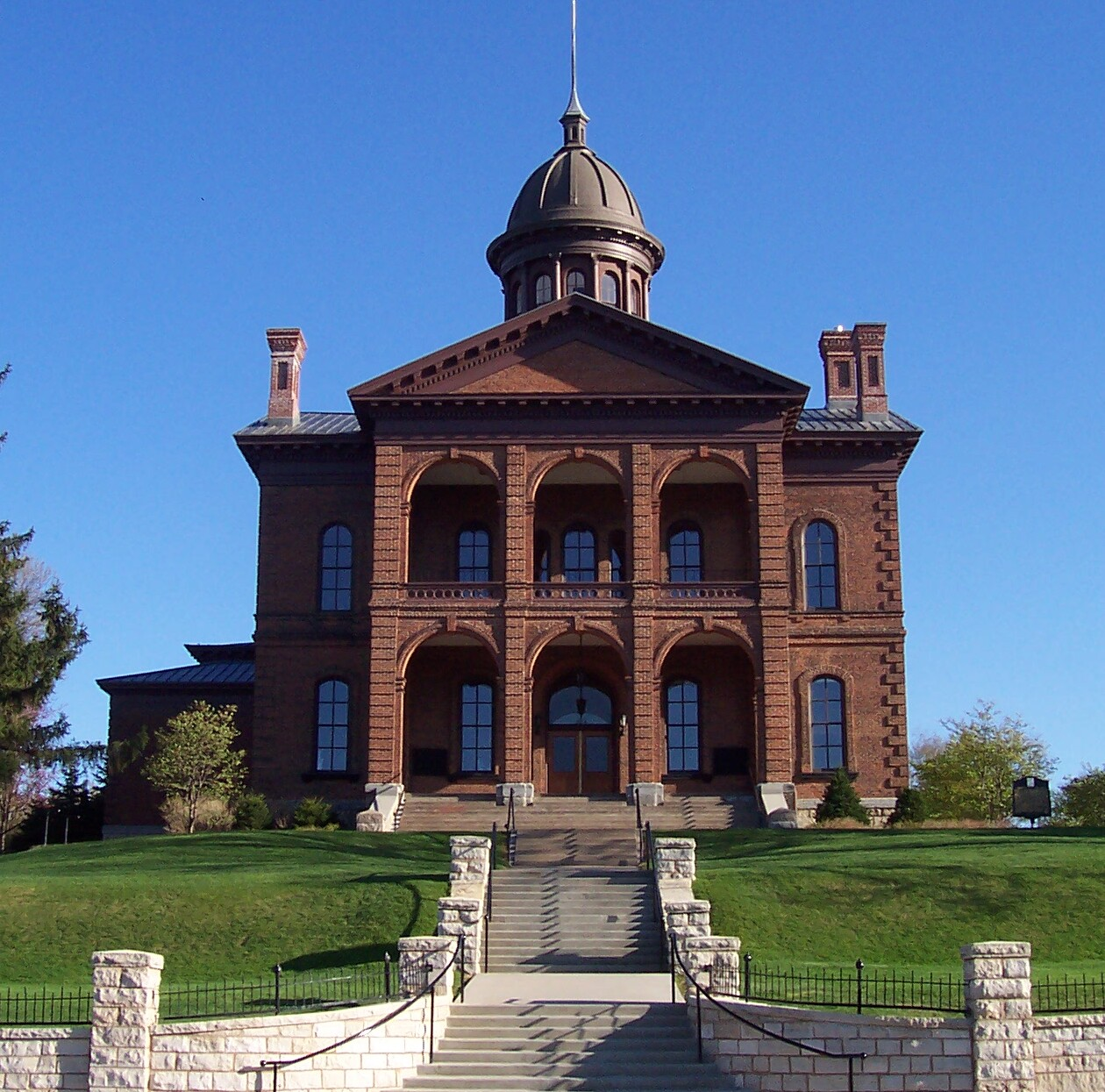
- Downtown Stillwater and St. Croix River Warden's House Museum Isaac Staples' Sawmill Stillwater Lift Bridge Washington County Courthouse

- Seal
- Nickname: The Birthplace of Minnesota
- Location of the city of Stillwater within Washington County, Minnesota

- Location within the United States
- Coordinates: 45°3′N 92°49′W
- Country: United States
- State: Minnesota
- County: Washington
- Metro: Minneapolis–Saint Paul
- First settled: October 26, 1843
- Named for: Still waters of the St. Croix River, Stillwater, Maine

Government
  - Mayor: Ted Kozlowski

Area
  - Total: 9.07 sq mi (23.50 km^{2})
  - Land: 8.05 sq mi (20.84 km^{2})
  - Water: 1.03 sq mi (2.66 km^{2})
- Elevation: 866 ft (264 m)

Population (2020)
  - Total: 19,394
  - Estimate (2025): 19,354
  - Density: 2,410.4/sq mi (930.66/km^{2})
- Time zone: UTC−6 (CST)
  - Summer (DST): UTC−5 (CDT)
- ZIP Codes: 55082, 55083
- Area code: 651
- FIPS code: 27-62824
- GNIS feature ID: 2395969
- Website: www.stillwatermn.gov

Stillwater is a city in the U.S. state of Minnesota and the county seat of Washington County. It is in the Minneapolis–Saint Paul metropolitan area, on the west bank of the St. Croix River, across from Houlton, Wisconsin. Stillwater's population was 19,394 at the 2020 census. Stillwater is often called "the birthplace of Minnesota" due to its role in the establishment of the state.

== Geography ==
According to the United States Census Bureau, the city has an area of 7.98 square miles (20.67 km^{2}); 6.96 square miles (18.03 km^{2}) is land and 1.02 square miles (2.64 km^{2}) is water. State Highways 36, 95, and 96 are three of the community's main routes.

== Climate ==
Stillwater receives an average annual snowfall of 42 inches (1,100 mm). Average annual rainfall is 24 in (610 mm). Each year has an average of 14 days above 90 °F (32 °C).

== Name ==
The name "Stillwater" was proposed in 1843 by John McKusick, who built the settlement's first sawmill. McKusick was later a state senator. The name derives from the St. Croix River's calmness near the town center. It is also believed that McKusick had fond memories of Stillwater, Maine, where he had migrated from.

Long before European Americans arrived the area was occupied by various indigenous peoples for thousands of years. The Dakota people called it Hoġan Wanḳe Kin, a term that encompassed not only the St. Croix River but also Lake St. Croix and a large sandbar across from present-day Afton. The name, meaning "the place where the fish lies", derived from a legend in which a man was transformed into a giant fish (a catfish or a pike, depending on the version) and then into a sandbar. In English, Hoġan Wanḳe Kin has been spelled variously as Hogan-wahnkay-kin, Hogan-wauke-kin and Hogan-wan-kee.

The Ojibwe name for the place was Giigoonzh-agomod, with the slightly different meaning of "where the fish floats". The Ojibwe origin legend is very similar, also involving a man transformed into a giant fish and found floating in the lake. He was ultimately transformed into "a piece of land crossing the lake there" (i.e., the sandbar). In English renderings, Giigo onh-zhagomod has been spelled as Kee-go-shagewa-minnie and Kegan-Shaw-Ga-Nut.

== History ==
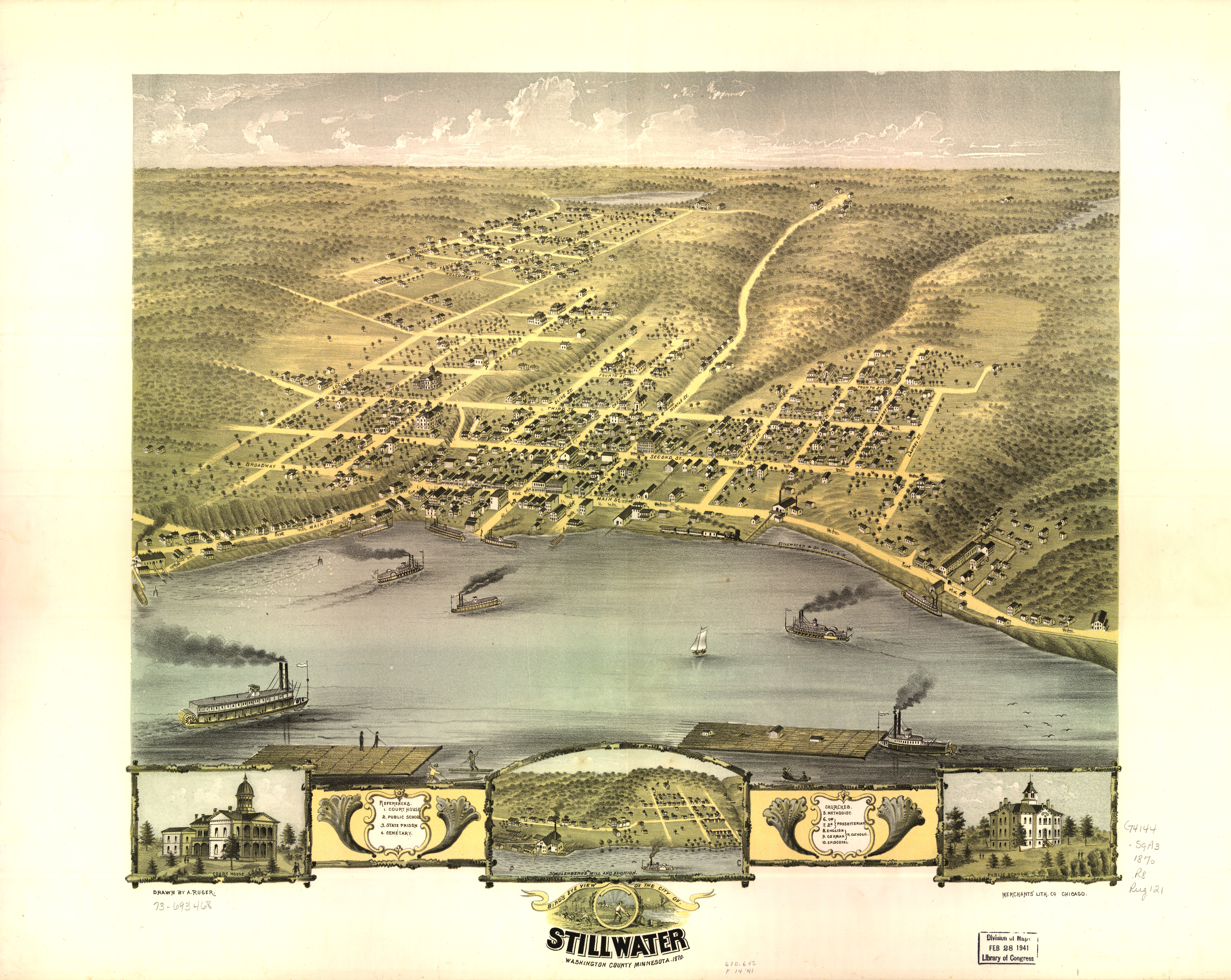
A panoramic sketch of Stillwater drawn by Albert Ruger in 1870.

In the 1830s, European Americans were pressing west into this territory. The U.S. government tried to arrange for their settlement in Native American lands, and on July 29 and September 29, 1837, it signed treaties with the local Ojibwe and Dakota nations to allow such settlement in the St. Croix Valley.

The settlement was founded on October 26, 1843, when four partners formed the Stillwater Lumber Company. Settlers were drawn by the area's abundant lumber and river traffic resulting from the industry. This was one of Minnesota's oldest towns, preceding Minneapolis by several years. Stillwater was officially incorporated as a city on March 4, 1854 (the same day as Saint Paul).

Stillwater is often called the "birthplace of Minnesota". In 1848, a territorial convention that began the process of establishing Minnesota as a state was held in Stillwater, at the corner of Myrtle and Main streets. Originally part of the Wisconsin Territory, Minnesota officially became a separate territory in 1849 and, after population increases, a state in 1858.

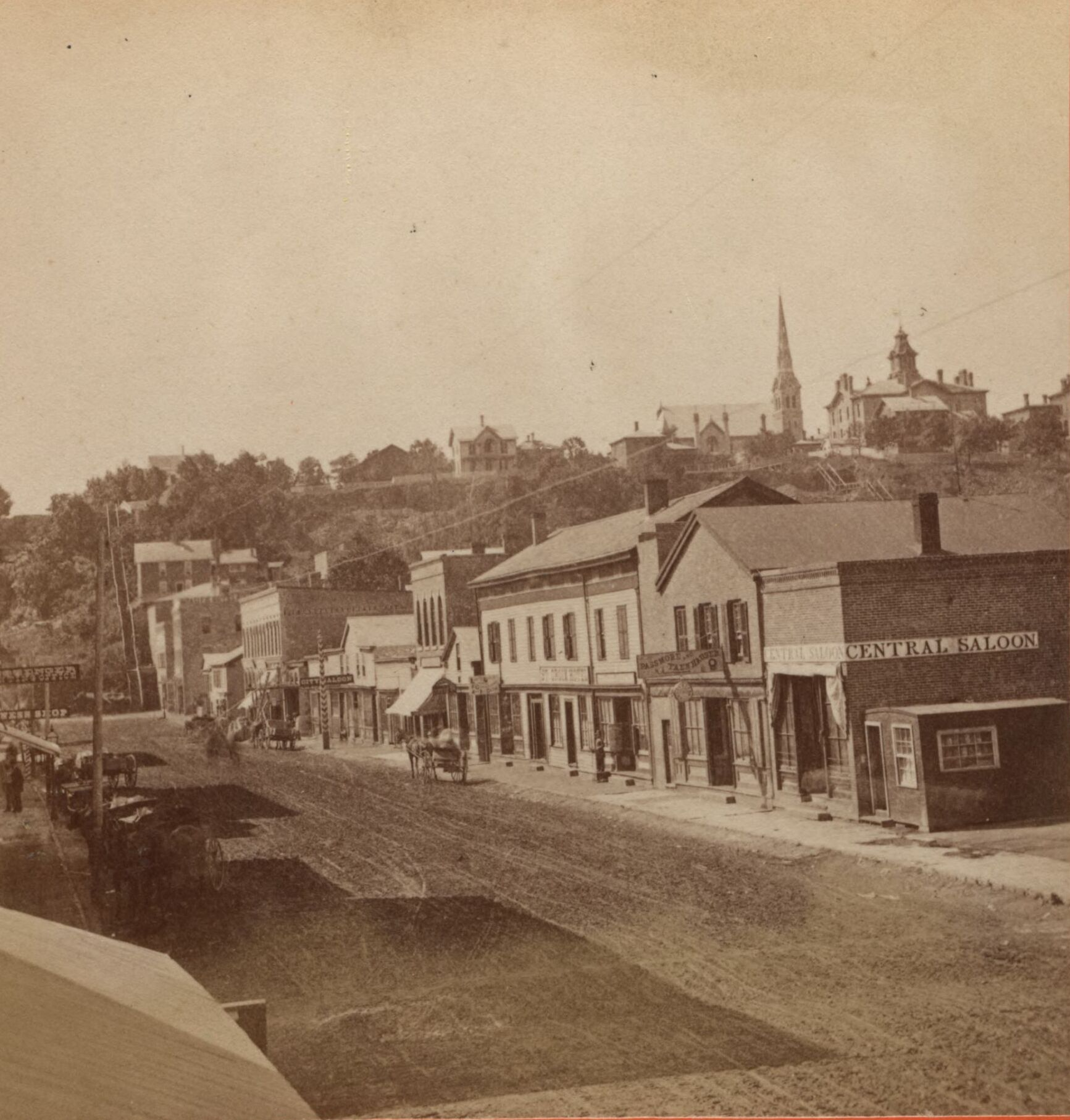
Looking south on Main Street in Stillwater, mid-1870s.

As more evidence of Stillwater's importance at the time, the territorial convention selected three leading Minnesota cities as locations for three important public institutions: Saint Paul was designated as the capital; the University of Minnesota was established at Minneapolis; and Stillwater became the site of the territory's first prison. The Minnesota Territorial Prison (later Minnesota State Prison) was opened in 1853. The prison held Cole, Jim, and Bob Younger, three of the Younger brothers of the James–Younger Gang.

Lumbering was the predominant industry in the St. Croix River Valley in the second half of the 19th century. For many years, lumbermen sent large rafts of logs down the St. Croix. They were collected at the St. Croix Boom Site two miles upstream of Stillwater, and processed in Stillwater's many sawmills. Steamboats were used most widely on the river from 1860 to 1890. A few still operate as entertainment venues today.

David Swain operated a shipyard and engine works in Stillwater. Excursion steamboats, such as the Verne Swain and the Capitol, began to operate in the early 20th century, taking passengers to other cities along the river.

During the American Civil War, Stillwater sent men of the 1st Minnesota Volunteer Infantry Company B, 5th Minnesota Infantry Regiment Company K, and the 8th Minnesota Volunteer Infantry Regiment Company C, among others, to fight for the Union.

On October 18, 1921, Charles Strite invented the automatic pop-up bread toaster in Stillwater. By 1926, the Toastmaster Company began to market the first household toaster using a redesigned version of Strite's invention. In 1923, Nelson's Ice Cream parlor was established.

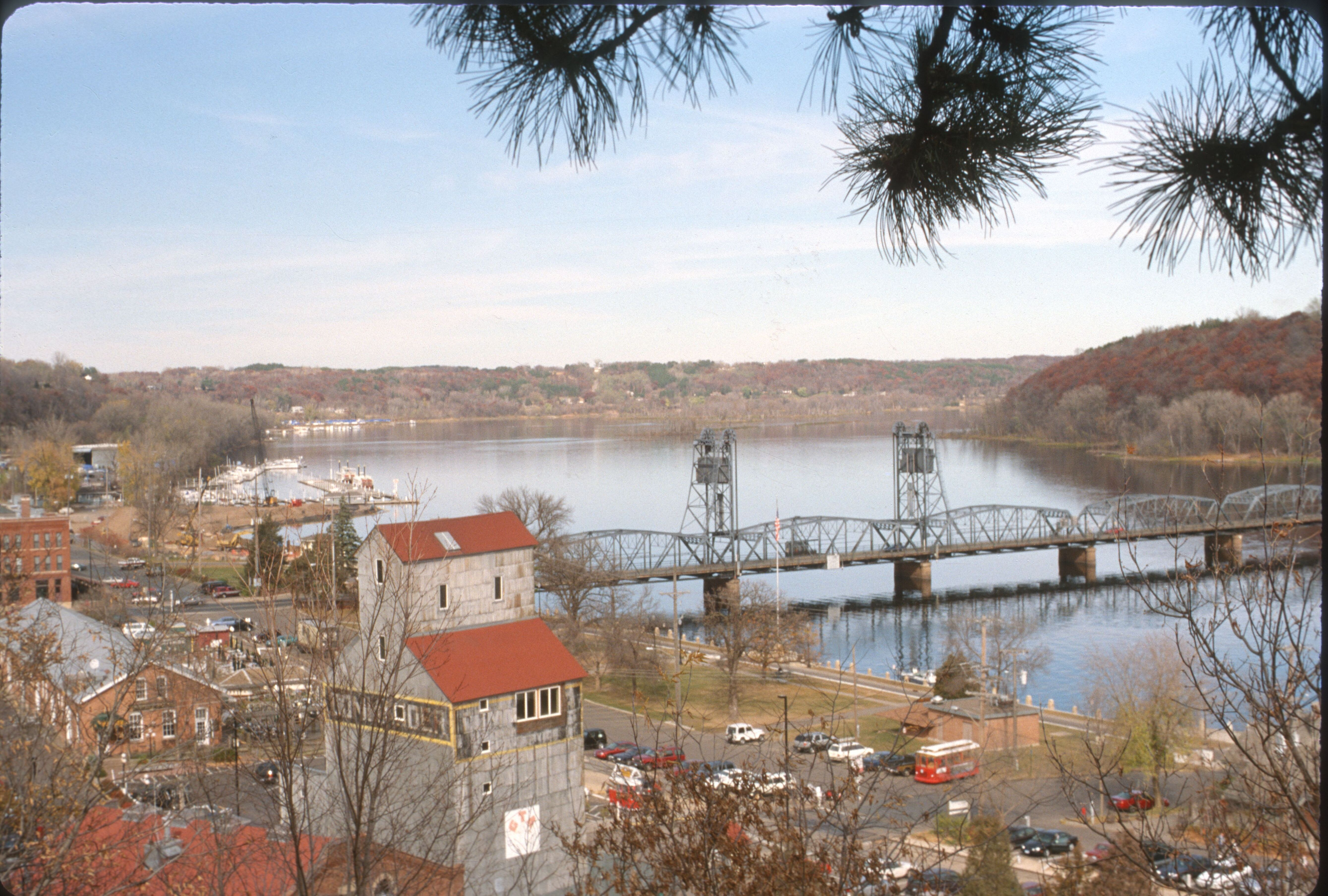
Birdseye view of the Stillwater Lift Bridge and the Commander Building, 1999, Stillwater, Minnesota

In 1931, construction of the Stillwater lift bridge over the St. Croix River was completed at a final cost of $460,174, which was split equally between Minnesota and Wisconsin. The lift bridge is one of the city's most iconic and visible local monuments. It was part of Minnesota State Highway 36 until 2017, when it closed to vehicle traffic. In 2020 it became part of a five-mile trail loop running through Stillwater and Houlton, Wisconsin.

In 1996 the city of Stillwater entered into an agreement with Stillwater Township to annex land. In 2015 the Stillwater city council approved the annexing the last of the land covered by the agreement. The city's western border is now Manning Avenue (County Road 15). The northern border is now mostly, but not entirely, Minnesota Highway 96.

Stillwater was described as the Minnesota headquarters of the Ku Klux Klan in 1991, and has been identified as a "probable" former sundown town.

The city has hosted an event called Lumberjack Days since the 1930s.

== Gallery ==
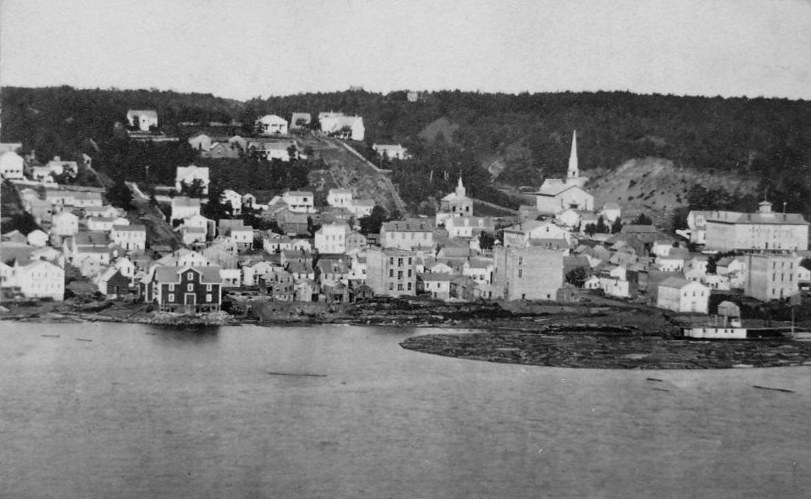
Stillwater c. 1860s

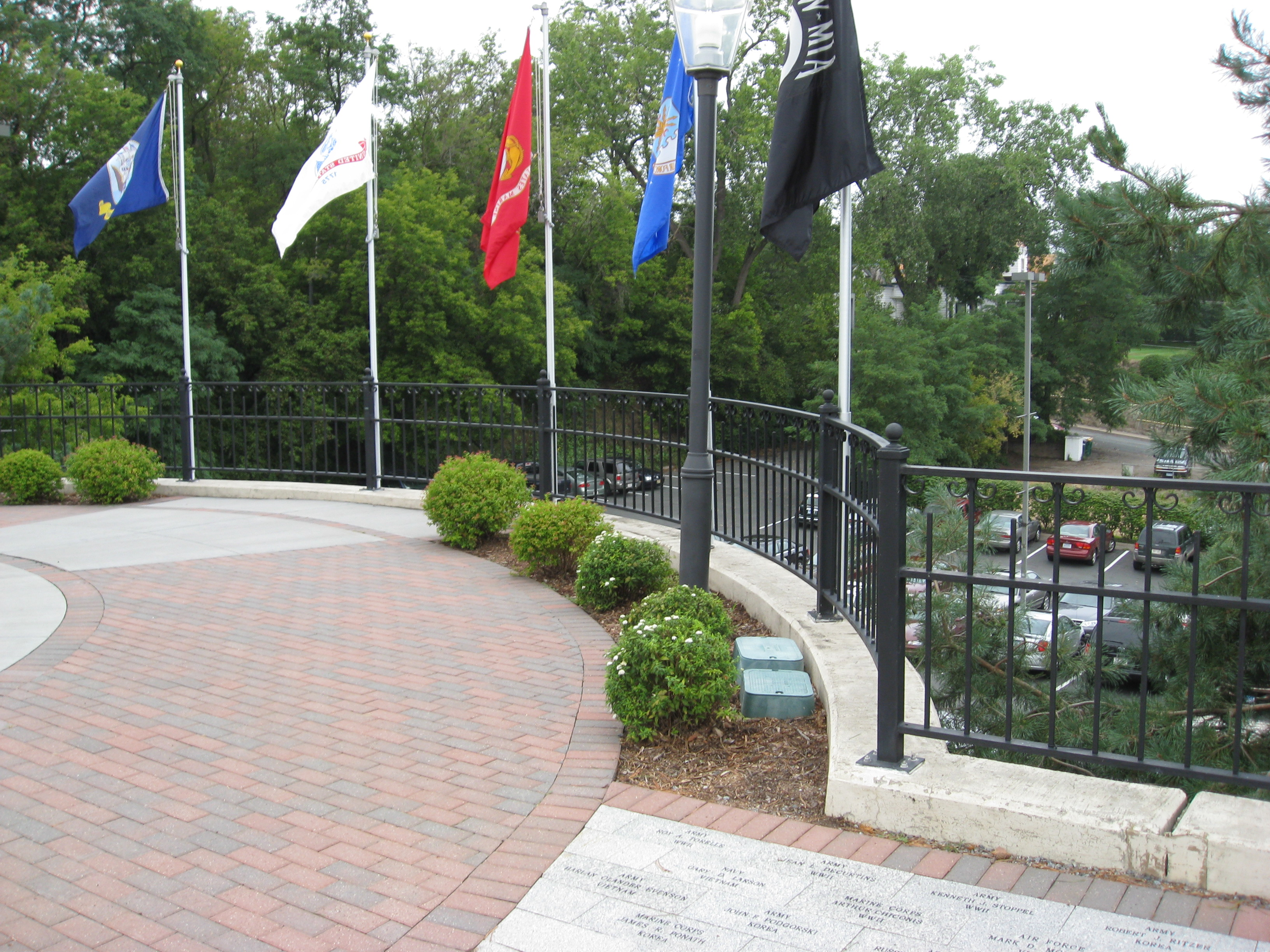
Across the street from the Courthouse, the Veterans' Memorial for local veterans

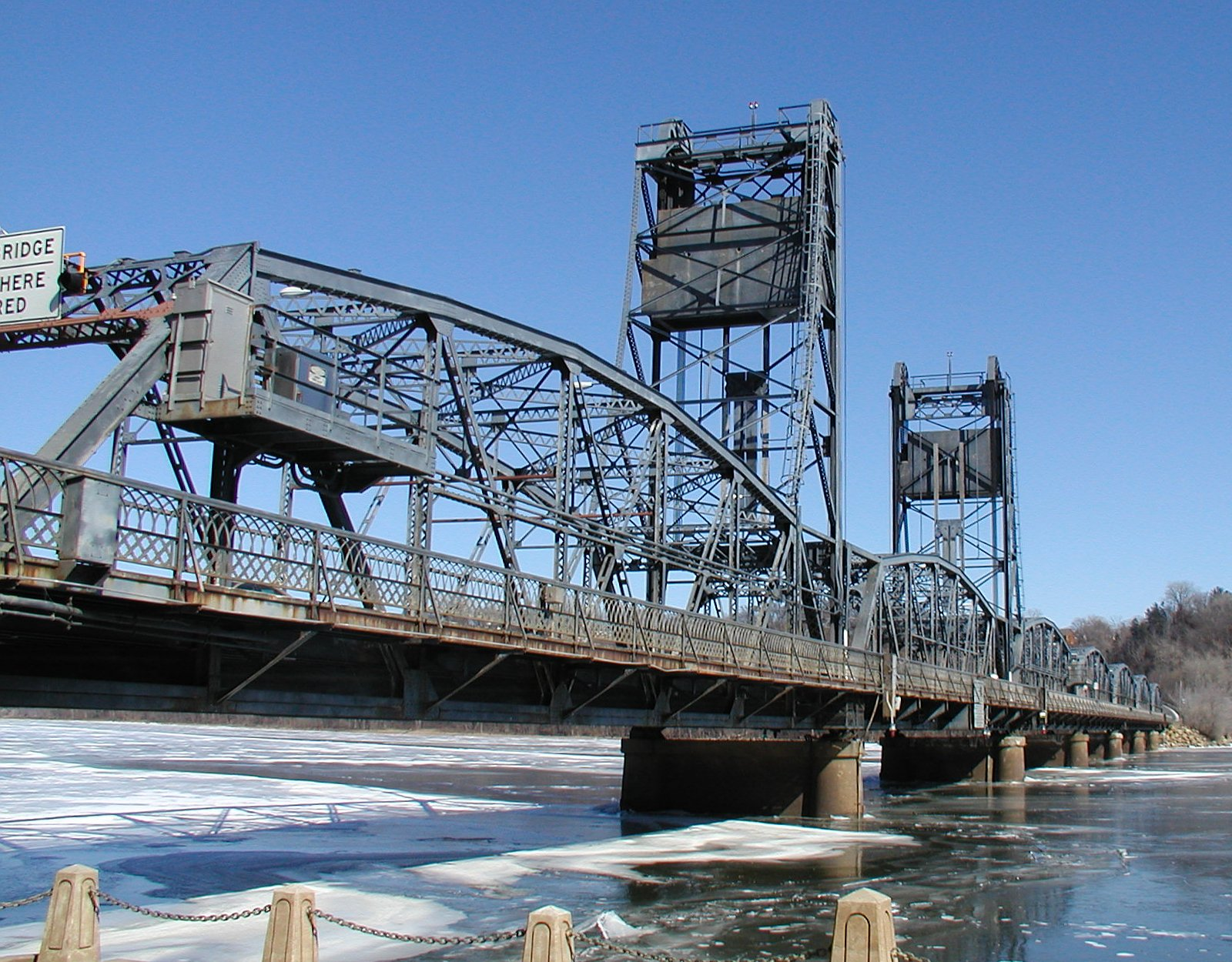
Lift Bridge

== Demographics ==
Historical population
Census	Pop.	Note	%±
1860	2,380		—
1870	4,124		73.3%
1880	9,055		119.6%
1890	11,260		24.4%
1900	12,318		9.4%
1910	10,198		−17.2%
1920	7,735		−24.2%
1930	7,173		−7.3%
1940	7,013		−2.2%
1950	7,674		9.4%
1960	8,310		8.3%
1970	10,191		22.6%
1980	12,290		20.6%
1990	13,882		13.0%
2000	15,143		9.1%
2010	18,225		20.4%
2020	19,394		6.4%
2025 (est.)	19,354		−0.2%
U.S. Decennial Census

=== Historic census data ===
==== 1870 ====
White: 4,106 (99.54%)
Colored: 18 (0.44%)
Indian: 1 (0.02%)
Total: 4,125

==== 1880 ====
White: 9,020 (99.71%)
Colored: 22 (0.24%)
Chinese or Japanese: 2 (0.02%)
Total: 9,046

==== 1890 ====
White: 11,209 (99.55%)
Colored: 18 (0.16%)
Civilized Indian: 1 (0.01%)
Total: 11,260

==== 1910 ====
White: 10,131 (99.4%)

Born in U.S. to two U.S.-born parents: 2,447 (23.99%)
Born in U.S. to one or two foreign-born parents: 4,910 (48.15%)
Born outside U.S. 2,774 (27.2%)

African American: 56 (0.49%)
Chinese, Japanese, or Indian: 5 (0.05%)
Total: 10,199

==== 1920 ====
White: 10,137 (99.95%)

Born in U.S. to two U.S.-born parents: 2,384 (30.82%)
Born in U.S. to one or two foreign-born parents: 3,683 (47.61%)
Born outside U.S. 1,664 (21.51%)

African American: 4 (0.05%)
Total: 7,735

==== 1940 ====
White: 7,012 (99.99%)
Other: 1 (0.01%)

==== 1950 ====
White: 99.9%
Other: 0.1%

==== 1960 ====
White: 99.9%
Other: 0.1%

==== 1970 ====
White: 10,159 (99.73%)
African American: 1 (0.01%)
Indian: 12 (0.12%)
Asian: 9 (0.09%)

Japanese: 3 (0.03%)
Filipino: 6 (0.06%)

Other: 6 (0.06%)

=== 2020 census ===
As of the 2020 census, Stillwater had a population of 19,394. The median age was 43.1 years. 23.7% of residents were under the age of 18 and 18.5% of residents were 65 years of age or older. For every 100 females there were 93.2 males, and for every 100 females age 18 and over there were 90.4 males age 18 and over.

99.5% of residents lived in urban areas, while 0.5% lived in rural areas.

There were 7,750 households in Stillwater, of which 31.4% had children under the age of 18 living in them. Of all households, 53.0% were married-couple households, 14.5% were households with a male householder and no spouse or partner present, and 26.8% were households with a female householder and no spouse or partner present. About 26.9% of all households were made up of individuals and 12.1% had someone living alone who was 65 years of age or older.

There were 8,210 housing units, of which 5.6% were vacant. The homeowner vacancy rate was 0.8% and the rental vacancy rate was 6.8%.

Racial composition as of the 2020 census
Race	Number	Percent
White	17,442	89.9%
Black or African American	321	1.7%
American Indian and Alaska Native	67	0.3%
Asian	294	1.5%
Native Hawaiian and Other Pacific Islander	9	0.0%
Some other race	170	0.9%
Two or more races	1,091	5.6%
Hispanic or Latino (of any race)	623	3.2%

White residents alone or in combination accounted for 95.4% of the population.

=== 2010 census ===
As of the census of 2010, there were 18,225 people, 7,075 households, and 4,885 families living in the city. The population density was 2,618.5 inhabitants per square mile (1,011.0/km^{2}). There were 7,576 housing units at an average density of 1,088.5 per square mile (420.3/km^{2}). The racial makeup of the city was 95.1% White, 1.0% African American, 0.4% Native American, 1.1% Asian, 0.6% from other races, and 1.8% from two or more races. Hispanic or Latino of any race were 1.9% of the population.

There were 7,075 households, of which 35.6% had children under the age of 18 living with them, 54.3% were married couples living together, 11.0% had a female householder with no husband present, 3.8% had a male householder with no wife present, and 31.0% were non-families. 25.5% of all households were made up of individuals, and 8.7% had someone living alone who was 65 years of age or older. The average household size was 2.51 and the average family size was 3.03.

The median age in the city was 40 years. 26.5% of residents were under the age of 18; 6.7% were between the ages of 18 and 24; 25.3% were from 25 to 44; 29% were from 45 to 64; and 12.8% were 65 years of age or older. The gender makeup of the city was 48.5% male and 51.5% female.

=== 2000 census ===
As of the census of 2000, there were 15,143 people, 5,797 households, and 4,115 families living in the city. The population density was 2,340.0 inhabitants per square mile (903.5/km^{2}). There were 5,926 housing units at an average density of 915.7 per square mile (353.6/km^{2}). The racial makeup of the city was 94.0% White, 0.9% African American, 0.4% Native American, 1.1% Asian, 0.02% Pacific Islander, 0.1% from other races, and 1.6% from two or more races. Hispanic or Latino of any race were 1.9% of the population.

There were 5,797 households, of which 36.8% had children under age 18 living with them, 57.2% were married couples living together, 10.8% had a female householder with no husband present, and 29.0% were non-families. 24.3% of all households were made up of individuals, and 9.0% had someone living alone who was 65 or older. The average household size was 2.55 and the average family size was 3.07.

In the city, the population was spread out, with 27.7% under the age of 18, 6.3% from 18 to 24, 28.8% from 25 to 44, 25.4% from 45 to 64, and 11.8% who were 65 years of age or older. The median age was 38 years. For every 100 females, there were 92.9 males. For every 100 females age 18 and over, there were 86.7 males.

The median household income was $57,154, and the median family income was $72,188. Males had a median income of $49,158 versus $33,680 for females. The per capita income was $27,163. About 3.0% of families and 4.3% of the population were below the poverty line, including 5.6% of those under 18 and 5.3% of those 65 or older.

=== 2016–2020 American Community Survey ===
According to the American Community Survey estimates for 2016–2020, the median income for a household in the city was $91,947, and the median income for a family was $109,151. Male full-time workers had a median income of $73,986 versus $67,005 for female workers. The per capita income for the city was $48,553. About 3.3% of families and 5.2% of the population were below the poverty line, including 4.6% of those under age 18 and 5.9% of those age 65 or over.

Of the population age 25 and over, 96.4% were high school graduates or higher and 46.6% had a bachelor's degree or higher.

== Education ==
Stillwater has a mix of public district, public charter, and private schools at the primary and secondary levels. The city is served by the Stillwater Area Public Schools system and the nearest high school is Stillwater Area High School in Oak Park Heights, Minnesota.

== Notable people ==
- Thomas J. Abercrombie, photographer, first journalist to reach South Pole, Born in Stillwater
- Ed Ackerson, musician (Polara, The 27 Various) and record producer (The Jayhawks, The Replacements, Motion City Soundtrack), born and attended high school in Stillwater
- Brian Arnfelt, NFL defensive end, attended high school in Stillwater
- Michele Bachmann, U.S. Representative, lived in Stillwater
- Ben Blankenship, member of Team USA Track and Field who set the world record in the distance medley
- Robert Brown, Minnesota state senator and educator, born in Stillwater
- Noah Cates, professional ice hockey player for the Philadelphia Flyers, born in Stillwater
- James B. Clark, director and Oscar-nominated film editor, born in Stillwater
- Jessie Diggins, Olympic gold medalist in cross-country skiing, attended high school in Stillwater
- Nate Dwyer, NFL linebacker, born in Stillwater
- Chris Engler, NBA player, born in Stillwater
- Otto Folin, biochemist, educated in Stillwater
- Sam Gorski and Niko Pueringer, creators of Corridor Digital
- Sean Graham, retired professional track athlete and current head track and cross country coach at American University
- Nicole Hause, skateboarder for REAL Skateboards and Nike SB, originally from Stillwater
- Patrick Hicks, novelist, poet, and essayist, grew up in Stillwater
- Phil Housley, Hockey Hall of Fame player and NHL coach, coached in Stillwater
- Sherri Jarvis, murder victim
- Todd Kalis, NFL guard, born in Stillwater
- Brandon Laatsch, game developer and YouTuber
- Jessica Lange, actress, resided in Stillwater
- Frankie Lee, musician, born in Stillwater
- Chris Maddock, stand-up comedian
- Jonah Marais, member of boy band Why Don't We
- Denis McDonough, 11th Secretary of Veterans Affairs and White House Chief of Staff for President Obama, born in Stillwater
- Harriet McPherson, Minnesota state legislator, farmer, and educator
- Bob Nelson, NFL linebacker, born in Stillwater
- Socrates Nelson, Minnesota state senator, resided in Stillwater
- Karl G. Neumeier, Minnesota state senator and lawyer, born in Stillwater
- Glen Perkins, pitcher for Minnesota Twins, born in Stillwater
- Sam Shepard, playwright and actor, resided in Stillwater
- Zach Sobiech, musical artist who wrote the #1 hit “Clouds” after being diagnosed with osteosarcoma; inspiration for the Disney film Clouds
- Rich Sommer, actor, raised in Stillwater
- LaVyrle Spencer, a New York Times bestselling author, lived in Stillwater
- Alpheus Beede Stickney, a famous railroad builder, lived in Stillwater, born in Maine
- C. Gardner Sullivan, screenwriter and producer, born in Stillwater
- John B. Taft, farmer and Minnesota state legislator, resided in Stillwater
- Butch Thompson, jazz pianist and clarinetist, went to high school in Stillwater
- Thomas Vanek, ice hockey forward for the Minnesota Wild, resides in Stillwater

== See also ==
- List of cities in Minnesota
- History of Minnesota
- Citizens for the St. Croix Valley political organization
