= Mount Blue (Maine) =

Mountain in the state of Maine

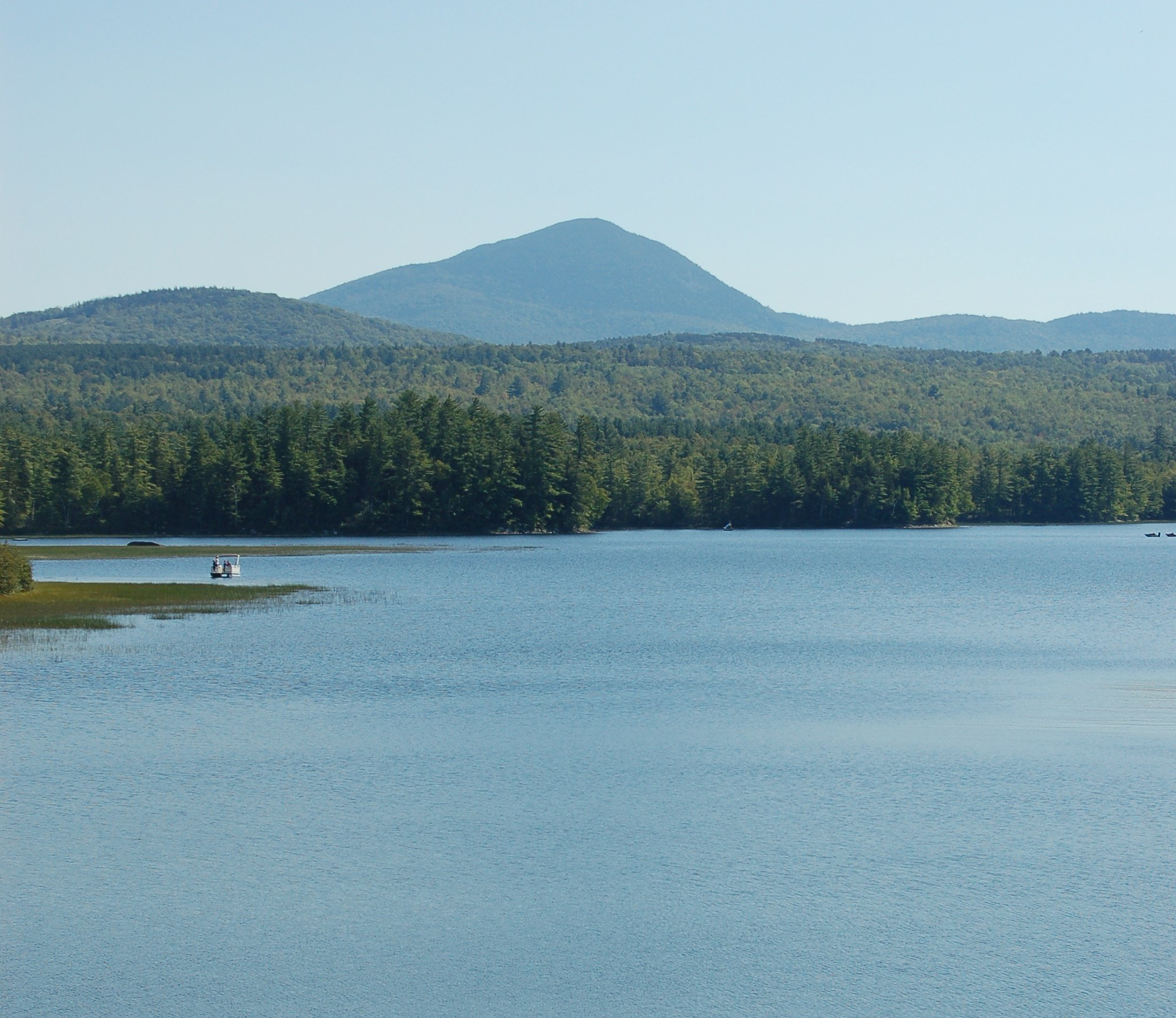
- Mt. Blue, seen from the north side of Webb Lake

Highest point
- Elevation: 3202 NAVD 88
- Prominence: 1,840 ft (560 m)
- Listing: 49 New England Fifty Finest
- Coordinates: 44°43′41″N 70°20′31″W

Geography
- Location within Maine
- Location: Franklin County, Maine, United States
- Topo map: USGS Mount Blue

Climbing
- Easiest route: Hiking, class 1

Mount Blue is a mountain in Maine, United States. It is a hiking destination with outstanding views from the observation deck of a tower at the summit. Its name is shared with Mount Blue State Park in Weld and Mount Blue High School in Farmington.

== Access to summit, and reflections ==
Mount Blue is a mountain 3,187 ft (971.4 m), in Franklin County, western Maine. To the south and west it drains into the Androscoggin River Valley, while the north and east slopes drain toward the Sandy River in the Kennebec River Valley. The summit and much of the trail are in the town of Avon, while the lower part of the trail is in Weld. The trail and summit are part of Mount Blue State Park, see map, history and further information. Access to the trailhead is through a chain-gated entrance road, Mt. Blue Road, which is located along Center Hill Road. Mt Blue Road is about 2.5 mi (4.02 km) long and is a dead end with the parking lot and trailhead at the end. Hours are 9 am til sunset, with no camping except groups in the Adirondack shelter at the end of the road, with reservations made in advance. However, camping is available at Mount Blue State Park's excellent campground on the southwest shore of Webb Lake. Camping reservations are recommended and can be made online starting in February each year.

On the drive along Mt. Blue Road, the forest protected in this state park is beautiful but, as with Maine forests in most places, it lacks larger sized trees and fallen logs that were here in the 1600s. The Wabanaki people were the first owners of these forests, summits and waters, and they continue to be present in Maine with us today. Visitors may notice occasional stone walls in the woods especially on the east side of the road. These were built by Anglo-European settlers as early as the late 1700s, some of whom had migrated from Massachusetts. They created open fields here, but the forest has long since reclaimed hard-won farm openings in this area. Some of the early settlers may be among those buried at Center Hill Cemetery (1809), on Center Hill Road in North Weld on the way from/to Route 142. Some of their descendants might still live in the area.

The trailhead has parking for about fifteen vehicles. An outhouse is available to the east of the parking lot near the Adirondack shelter. The hiking distance from trailhead to summit is 1.6 mi (2.58 km) (incorrectly indicated as 1.2 mi on at least one map), with an approximate 1600 ft (488 m) elevation gain. This is a steep, rocky, strenuous trail with only a few short level areas, but no iron rings or much bouldering. While the trail is well marked at the trailhead there are few other markings. Just a few obvious side trails are apparent over the length of the trail, and it seems that most hikers are unlikely to lose their way; just stay with the well-worn path. Over the years some sections have been improved by Maine Conservation Corps volunteers with water bars and stone steps. Less than halfway up, below a stream crossing, are the remnants of an old cabin that was used by people working in the former fire lookout tower at the summit. Its associated outhouse (a two-holer) is across the trail. Both are now in disrepair. As the trail ascends, some mature yellow birch trees are dominant in the canopy, but then higher up, the spruce-fir slope forest is prominent on bouldery steep ground. Mountain paper birch, red spruce, black spruce, and balsam fir are the principal tree species in the upper slopes.

The trail increases in steepness as one approaches the summit, ascending a cone-like upper part of the mountain. At the summit there is a large, elaborate galvanized steel tower that appears from a distance to be a fire tower, but it is a communications tower, part of a vital emergency network. There is also a utility building with warning signs and absolutely no access. The public can climb steel steps to the second level of the tower to enjoy 360 degree views from what is referred to as the observation deck. In clear weather, Mount Washington in the Presidential Range, Hew Hampshire, can be seen about 54.2 mi (87.23 km) to the southwest. Sugarloaf Mountain in Carrabasset Valley, Maine can be seen 20.6 mi (33.15 km) to the North. The route back to the trailhead and parking lot are the same as the trail up. Estimated hiking times to the summit seem to have been offered by hardy, fast-paced hikers. Slower hikers should start early, and allow all day long. It is suggested to bring two bottles of water per person, extra food, and rain gear. Cell coverage can be had at the summit but is otherwise unreliable at the State Park and should probably not be considered an emergency backup.

In the 1940s there was a proposal for a ski hill on Mount Blue and a winter recreation complex nearby; these were illustrated in an engaging flier but developments did not take place.

== Nearby lakes ==
West of Mount Blue is Webb Lake, a very shallow 2,124-acre (8.60 km^{2}) lake. Webb Lake is publicly accessible and has several fish species, including brook trout. About 3 miles (4.8 km) north of Mount Blue is Mount Blue Pond, a 134-acre (0.54 km^{2}) lake that is accessible by the public and is reported to have good fishing.
