= Webb Lake (Maine) =

Body of water in Maine, United States

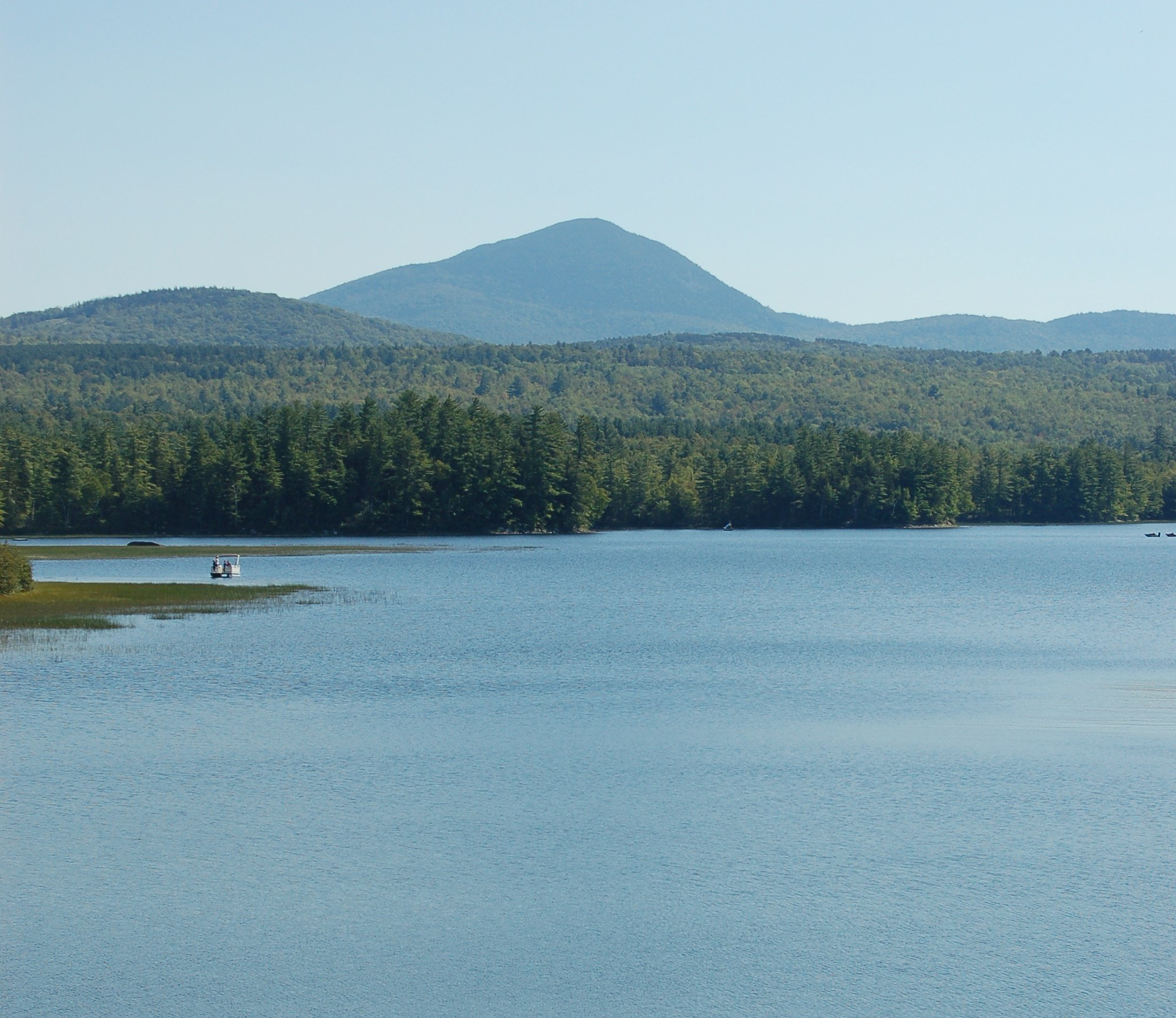
- Webb Lake and Mt. Blue

- Location within Maine Location within the United States
- Location: Weld, Franklin County, Maine, United States
- Coordinates: 44°41′53″N 70°26′55″W
- Type: Glacial
- Primary inflows: several small tributaries
- Primary outflows: Webb River
- Basin countries: United States
- Max. length: 4.57 mi (7.35 km)
- Max. width: 1.51 mi (2.43 km)
- Surface area: 2,146 acres (868 ha)
- Max. depth: 42 ft (13 m)
- Surface elevation: 676 feet (206 m)
- Settlements: Weld

Webb Lake is a lake in the town of Weld in Franklin County, Maine.

Webb Lake is publicly accessible via a boat launch in Mount Blue State Park and has several fish species, including brook trout. The lake's principal fisheries are brown trout, smallmouth bass, white perch, and chain pickerel. Water quality is marginal for coldwater fish due to warm temperatures and low dissolved oxygen

Lake Webb is home to Camp Kawanhee for Boys and The Kawanhee Inn. It is also home to Camp Lawroweld at the head of the lake.

== See also ==
- Bass Rock, a large boulder offshore of Webb Beach in Webb Lake
