= John B. Taft =

John B. Taft (February 1, 1826 – June 23, 1900) was an American farmer and politician.

Taft was born in Weld, Franklin County, Maine. He went to the public schools. He moved to Stillwater, Washington County, Minnesota in 1856 with his wife and family and was a farmer. Taft served in the Minnesota House of Representatives in 1889 and 1890 and was a Republican. Taft died from complications from surgery at the Lake Elmo Sanitorium in Minnesota.
