= Nelson's Ice Cream =

Ice cream parlor in Minnesota, USA

Coordinates: 45°3′12.5″N 92°49′8″W

Restaurant information
- Established: 1923; 103 years ago
- Owner: Dave Najaria
- Location: Minnesota
- Website: nelsonsicecream.biz

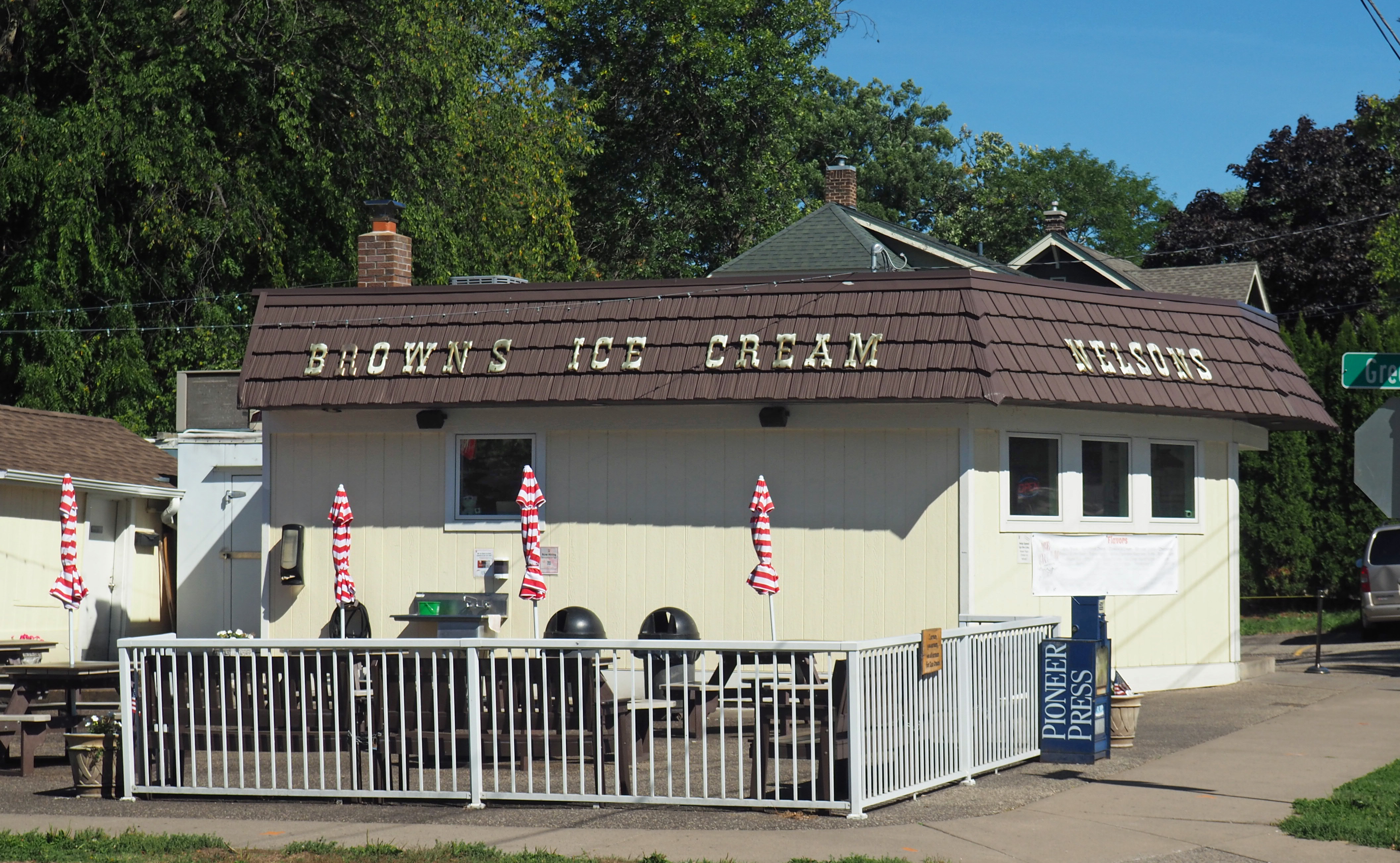
Nelson's Ice Cream in Stillwater, Minnesota

Nelson's Ice Cream is an ice cream parlor in Stillwater, Minnesota, United States, a tourist town on the St. Croix River. It was established in 1923.

== History ==
Nelson's was originally a grocery store called Seven Corners, which was operated by John Lustig in the 1920s. Along with all of the other groceries that were sold, so was Supreme ice cream. Lustig added on to the grocery store in the 1930s but died soon after in 1947. Art Nelson (local Stillwaterians still refer to it as Art's), who lived on the property, took over running the store after Lustig died. The Nelsons ran a business in Minneapolis, MN by the name of Brown's Ice Cream. In 1964 when Art died, his nephew Wade bought the store and continued to run it but added large portion ice cream cones to their menu in the 1960s. Eventually the name was changed to Nelson's Dairy Store. The store was sold in 1992 to Bob Pasket and Chuck Kummeth, who continued the tradition of serving large portions. In 2006 Nelson's was sold again to Stillwater natives Dave Najarian and Bill Bergstrom. Najarian is currently running the store.

== Nelson's today ==
Nelson's is open from April to October every year. Nelson's serves a variety of flavors such as Pirate's Booty, Snowflake, and Rocky Road. The ice cream that is sold at Nelson's is provided by "Brown's Ice Cream", which was owned by the Nelson family.

Nelson's was originally a grocery store and deals with a limited amount of indoor space, therefore there is no indoor seating, only a few picnic tables outside. Nelson's is still known for their massive portions, the most outrageous being the Lumberjack, which consists of five scoops of ice cream and some toppings. There is a wall in the store with pictures of people who were able to finish the Lumberjack.
