= Zebulon York =

American lawyer

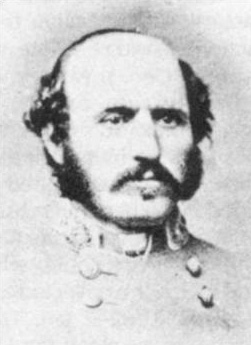
- Born: October 10, 1819; Avon, Maine
- Died: August 5, 1900 (aged 80); Natchez, Mississippi
- Military career
- Allegiance: Confederate States of America
- Branch: Confederate States Army
- Service years: 1861–65
- Rank: Brigadier General
- Commands: 14th Louisiana Infantry Regiment; Louisiana Brigade
- Conflicts: American Civil War Peninsula Campaign Second Battle of Bull Run Battle of Antietam Battle of Fredericksburg Gettysburg campaign Bristoe Campaign Mine Run Campaign Battle of the Wilderness Battle of Spotsylvania Court House Valley Campaigns of 1864

Zebulon York (October 10, 1819 – August 5, 1900) was a general in the Confederate States Army during the American Civil War. He was among a small group of Northern-born Confederate generals.

== Early life ==
York was a native of Avon, Maine. His grandfather was aide-de-camp to General George Washington during the American Revolution and was present at the surrender of Lord Cornwallis following the Battle of Yorktown. York graduated from Transylvania University in Kentucky, and then studied law at the University of Louisiana.

He was a pre-war lawyer and cotton planter in the state of Louisiana. With his business partner E.J. Hoover, York was recorded as owning 782 people as slaves on their six plantations in Concordia Parish, which ranked them as the sixth largest slaveholders in the United States, as well as the second largest in Louisiana.

== Civil War ==
When the state seceded from the Union in early 1861, York organized a company of the 14th Louisiana Infantry and served as its first captain. He was successively promoted to major and lieutenant colonel, and fought in the Peninsula Campaign in the summer of 1862. He was wounded during the Battle of Williamsburg. He displayed personal bravery and good military judgement during the Seven Days Battles and was promoted to an opening as the regiment's colonel in August 1862.

Colonel York led the 14th Louisiana in the battles of Second Manassas (being wounded a second time), Antietam, and Fredericksburg. In the winter and spring of 1863, he returned to Louisiana on recruiting duty to help replenish the dwindling ranks of his regiment. He returned in time for the Gettysburg campaign and the subsequent Bristoe Campaign and Mine Run Campaign.

In 1864, York participated in the battles of the Wilderness and Spotsylvania Court House. He was promoted to brigadier general in May and assigned command of the combination of two depleted Louisiana brigades previously led by Harry T. Hays and Leroy A. Stafford. Serving in the division of John B. Gordon in Jubal A. Early's Army of the Valley, York fought in many of the battles and skirmishes in Early's Raid on Washington, including the Battle of Monocacy in Maryland. He was severely wounded in the Shenandoah Valley at the Battle of Opequon and incapacitated for any further field service.

After his lengthy recuperation, York was assigned to recruiting duty in various prisoner-of-war camps. After the fall of Richmond, York and a small number of troops and artillery successfully defended the Yadkin River Bridge from an attack by Stoneman's Raiders, enabling fleeing President Jefferson Davis to evade capture for some time, when he had reached Salisbury by carriage (because of the many railroads already damaged by Stoneman) on his flight from Greensboro.

== Postbellum ==
Following the war, York returned to Vidalia, Louisiana, to find that all six of his sprawling plantations had been destroyed. Undaunted, he opened and ran a profitable hotel, the York House, across the river in Natchez. He also purchased five steamboats and began delivering people, cargo, and livestock to rural areas. In 1882, his steamboats helped deliver relief supplies to flood victims.

Zebulon York died in Natchez, Mississippi, and is buried in Natchez City Cemetery.

== See also ==
- List of American Civil War generals (Confederate)
- Stoneman's Raid: Salisbury and the Yadkin River Bridge
