= Weld, Maine =

Town in Maine, United States

- Town
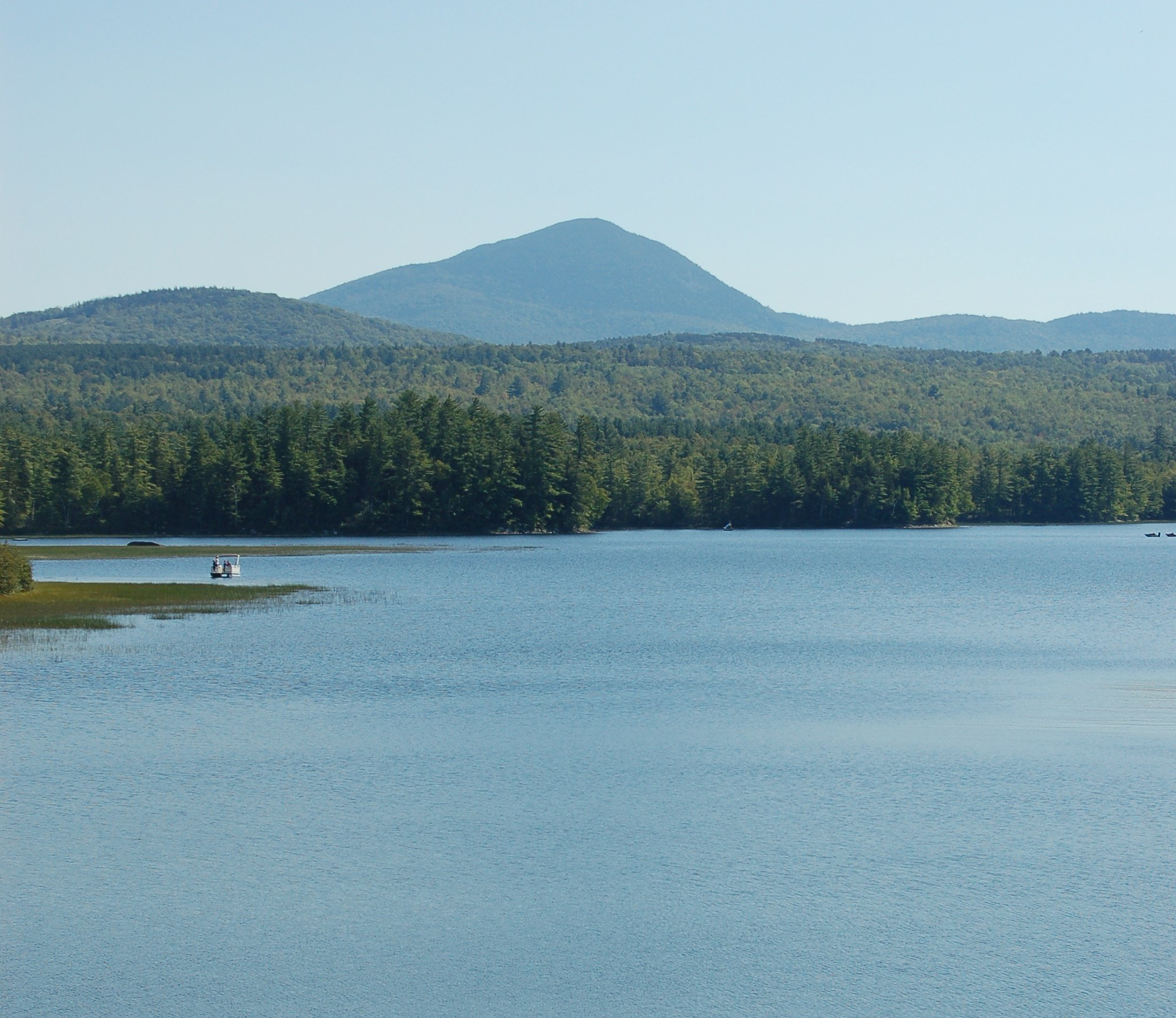
- Webb Lake and Mount Blue

- Location within the state of Maine
- Coordinates: 44°42′42″N 70°26′23″W
- Country: United States
- State: Maine
- County: Franklin
- Incorporated: 1816
- Communities: Weld; Weld Corner

Area
  - Total: 62.87 sq mi (162.83 km^{2})
  - Land: 59.50 sq mi (154.10 km^{2})
  - Water: 3.37 sq mi (8.73 km^{2})
- Elevation: 679 ft (207 m)

Population (2020)
  - Total: 376
  - Density: 6.2/sq mi (2.4/km^{2})
- Time zone: UTC-5 (Eastern (EST))
  - Summer (DST): UTC-4 (EDT)
- ZIP code: 04285
- Area code: 207
- FIPS code: 23-81300
- GNIS feature ID: 582798
- Website: www.weld-maine.org

Weld is a town in Franklin County, Maine, United States. The population was 376 at the 2020 census. Set beside Webb Lake and almost surrounded by mountains, Weld is noted for its scenery. It is home to Mount Blue State Park, Camp Kawanhee for Boys, and Camp Lawroweld.

== History ==
Originally called No. 5 (or Webb's Pond Plantation), it was first settled in 1800 by Nathaniel Kittredge and his family from Chester, New Hampshire. The town was part of an extensive tract purchased about 1790 from the state of Massachusetts by Jonathan Phillips of Boston. Phillips was an investor whose agent, Jacob Abbott of Wilton, New Hampshire, resold parcels of the land to settlers. Together with Benjamin Weld of Boston, Abbott and his brother-in-law Thomas Russell Jr. in 1815 bought what remained of the Phillips tract.

Incorporated on February 8, 1816, the town was named for its proprietor, Benjamin Weld, a member of the Weld family. Inauspiciously, 1816 was the Year Without a Summer, when unusually cold weather threatened northeastern communities with famine.

A longtime resident of Weld was Pomp Russell, an African-American man adopted as a very young child by Thomas and Bethia Holt Russell in Andover, Massachusetts in the early 1760s. The only extant record is a church baptism for Pompey, “servant to Thomas Russel” in Andover, MA. on November 18, 1764. Thomas Russell, son of Joseph, was born in Andover, MA June 5, 1732. He and Bethia Holt married May 15, 1760, in Andover, MA. In 1769, Thomas and Bethia and four children (Bethia, Thomas, Jr., Pomp and Hannah) moved to Wilton, N.H. In September 1769, Thomas purchased for £106, 13 shillings and 4 pence, lot 8, and two and a half acres of Lot 7, both in the seventh range, Wilton, New Hampshire. Another son, Daniel, was born a few months after their move to Wilton, N.H.

Pomp Russell served at the Battle of Bunker Hill in June 1775 and was later caught spying behind British lines. Russell was lined up to be shot when he managed to escape. About 1781 at age 21, Pomp was awarded his freedom by Thomas, his father and adoptive parent. On June 26, 1788, Pomp Russell married Margaret Cutt. In handwritten town records of Packersfield, N.H. the birth on December 5, 1789, of their first child, Peter, is recorded. (Nelson is present day name of Packersfield). In the 1790 U.S. census of Packersfield, N.H., the entry for Pompey Russell shows three free colored people: Pomp, Peggy, and their first-born, Peter. Zadok was born February 1, 1794. Pomp was a farmer, owning one or two cows between 1789 and 1804 and also fencing was mentioned in the handwritten tax records. Come 1804, he was taxed for 1 ton of hay and 3 acres of pasture land. Around this time, Pomp's brothers, Abel and Joseph, invited him and his family to leave Packersfield and join them in Weld, Maine where their father Thomas had moved prior to his move to Temple. The brothers had built Pomp's family a home on Center Hill in Weld.

Weld is located on a fairly level area of gravelly loam almost surrounded by mountains, some of which are beyond the town's limits. Farmers cultivated corn, potatoes, wheat and oats. Weld was noted for numerous and prolific apple orchards. Streams provided water power for mills, which included five sawmills, three box mills, a gristmill and a carding machine. It also produced fork and shovel handles, butter tubs, harness and tinware. Other industries were a starch factory, blacksmith and tannery. By 1870, the population was 1,130.

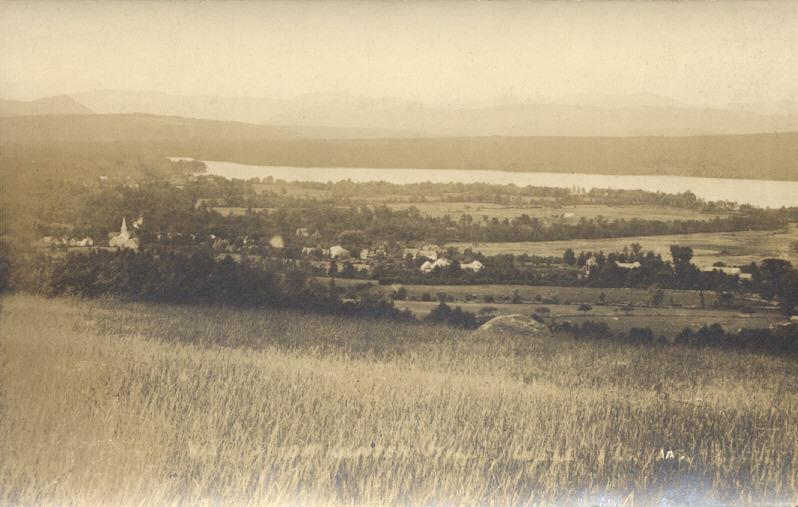
Bird's-eye view c. 1915

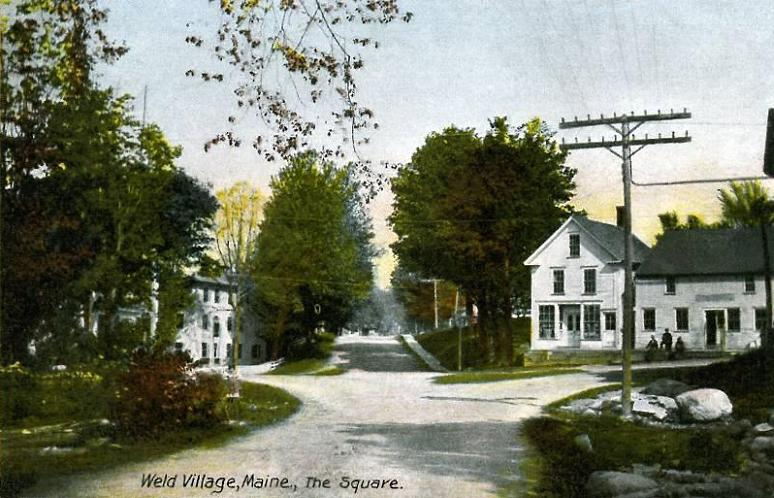
The Square c. 1906

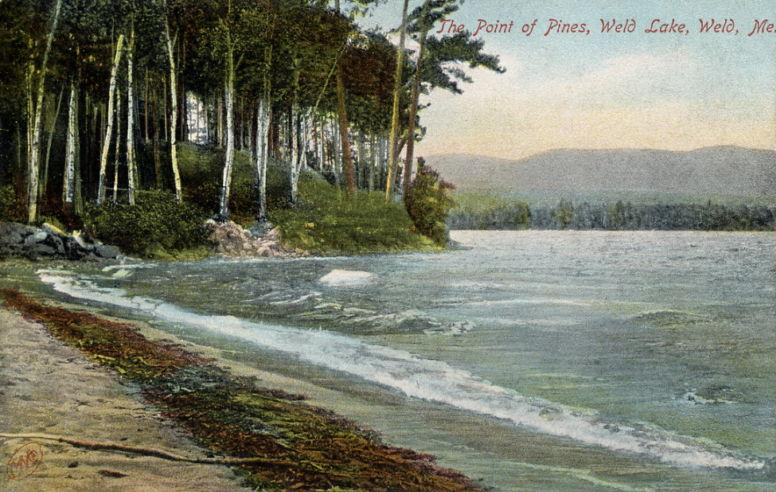
Webb Lake c. 1908

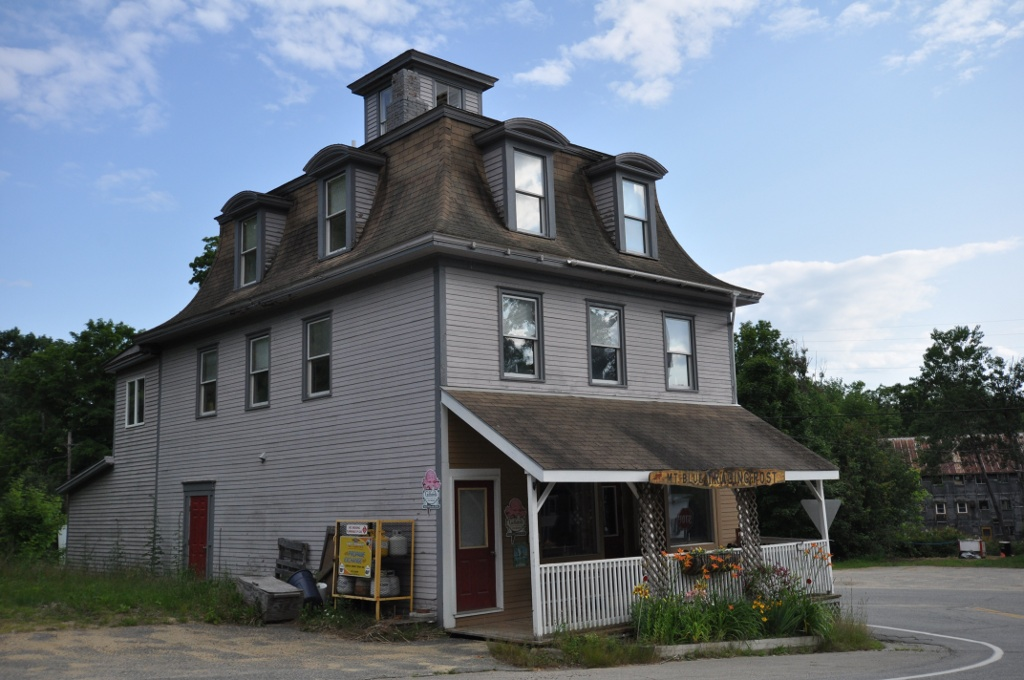
Mount Blue Trading Post

== Geography ==
According to the United States Census Bureau, the town has a total area of 62.87 square miles (162.83 km^{2}), of which 59.50 square miles (154.10 km^{2}) is land and 3.37 square miles (8.73 km^{2}) is water. Weld is situated beside Webb Lake, which is drained by the Webb River, a tributary of the Androscoggin River.

The town is crossed by state routes 142 and 156. It borders the town of Phillips and Unincorporated Township No. 6 to the north, Avon and Temple to the east, and Carthage and Perkins Plantation to the south.

Weld is home to Spruce Mountain and Hurricane Mountain, and considered home to several summits outside the town's boundaries, including Tumbledown Mountain and Mount Blue.

== Demographics ==
Historical population
Census	Pop.	Note	%±
1820	489		—
1830	765		56.4%
1840	1,045		36.6%
1850	995		−4.8%
1860	1,035		4.0%
1870	1,130		9.2%
1880	1,040		−8.0%
1890	885		−14.9%
1900	738		−16.6%
1910	574		−22.2%
1920	521		−9.2%
1930	493		−5.4%
1940	422		−14.4%
1950	361		−14.5%
1960	348		−3.6%
1970	360		3.4%
1980	435		20.8%
1990	430		−1.1%
2000	402		−6.5%
2010	419		4.2%
2020	376		−10.3%
U.S. Decennial Census

=== 2010 census ===
As of the census of 2010, there were 419 people, 194 households, and 138 families living in the town. The population density was 7.0 inhabitants per square mile (2.7/km^{2}). There were 632 housing units at an average density of 10.6 per square mile (4.1/km^{2}). The racial makeup of the town was 97.9% White, 0.2% African American, 0.2% from other races, and 1.7% from two or more races. Hispanic or Latino of any race were 0.2% of the population.

There were 194 households, of which 15.5% had children under the age of 18 living with them, 64.4% were married couples living together, 2.1% had a female householder with no husband present, 4.6% had a male householder with no wife present, and 28.9% were non-families. 22.7% of all households were made up of individuals, and 7.7% had someone living alone who was 65 years of age or older. The average household size was 2.16 and the average family size was 2.46.

The median age in the town was 54 years. 11% of residents were under the age of 18; 5.9% were between the ages of 18 and 24; 14% were from 25 to 44; 45.1% were from 45 to 64; and 23.9% were 65 years of age or older. The gender makeup of the town was 51.3% male and 48.7% female.

=== 2000 census ===
As of the census of 2000, there were 402 people, 176 households, and 132 families living in the town. The population density was 6.7 people per square mile (2.6/km^{2}). There were 691 housing units at an average density of 11.6 per square mile (4.5/km^{2}). The racial makeup of the town was 98.01% White, and 1.99% from two or more races. Hispanic or Latino of any race were 0.50% of the population.

There were 176 households, out of which 29.0% had children under the age of 18 living with them, 63.1% were married couples living together, 3.4% had a female householder with no husband present, and 25.0% were non-families. 21.6% of all households were made up of individuals, and 11.9% had someone living alone who was 65 years of age or older. The average household size was 2.28 and the average family size was 2.60.

In the town, the population was spread out, with 20.6% under the age of 18, 2.0% from 18 to 24, 29.1% from 25 to 44, 31.1% from 45 to 64, and 17.2% who were 65 years of age or older. The median age was 44 years. For every 100 females, there were 112.7 males. For every 100 females age 18 and over, there were 100.6 males.

The median income for a household in the town was $37,250, and the median income for a family was $41,250. Males had a median income of $27,708 versus $21,875 for females. The per capita income for the town was $17,796. About 14.1% of families and 14.0% of the population were below the poverty line, including 20.8% of those under age 18 and 13.0% of those age 65 or over.

== Notable people ==
- Henry Braun, poet
- C. J. Stevens, author
- John B. Taft, Minnesota state legislator
