= Bass Rock (EP) =

EP by Clyde Carson
- Released: July 21, 2009
- Recorded: Infinite Sound Studios (Alameda, CA), Rehab, (Las Vegas, NV)Tape Vault, (San Francisco, CA)
- Genre: Hip-hop, Hyphy
- Label: Moe Doe Records, Black Wall Street
- Producer: Bedrock, Cookin' Soul, Finatik N Zac, Jim Jonsin, Raw Smoov, Street Symphony

Clyde Carson chronology
Doin That (2007)	Bass Rock (2009)	Playboy (2014)

Bass Rock is the second EP by American recording artist Clyde Carson on Moe Doe Entertainment released on July 21, 2009. A member of Bay Area The Team and a solo artist as well, Clyde devoted a lot of his time to the Team, but still did work on his own. The guest appearances on the album are The Jacka, Prozak, and Soni.

== Background ==
As one of the most anticipated rap artists from the Bay, Clyde went into his own career by signing with Capitol Records while still being able to release independent projects.

== Track listing ==
- All production, writing, and track listing credits provided by Discogs.com, except track 6 which comes from cduniverse.

No.	Title	Writer(s)	Producer(s)	Length
1.	"Belevier"	Joseph Epperson, Nyle Parish	Bedrock	4:14
2.	"Popular Thugs" (featuring The Jacka)	D. L. Newton, N. Parish, Shaheed Akbar, Torrance Esmond	Street Symphony	3:03
3.	"Bo"	J. Epperson, N. Parish	Bedrock	3:37
4.	"Crooked"	N. Parish	Cookin' Soul	4:21
5.	"Wonderful" (featuring Prozak)	Isaac De Boni, Michael Mule, N. Parish	Finatik N Zac	3:32
6.	"I'm On" (featuring Soni)	Jacob Tupolo, N. Parish	Raw Smoov	3:44
7.	"Secret Lover"	N. Parish	Jim Jonsin	4:16

== Personnel ==
All credits adapted from AllMusic.

- Bedrock – producer
- Clyde Carson – executive producer, primary artist
- Cookin Soul – producer
- Jason "Jay E" Epperson – producer
- Prozack Turner – featured artist
- Soni – featured artist
- Street Symphony – producer
- The Jacka – featured artist
- Jacob Tupolo – composer
- Zac – producer
