= Tumbledown Mountain =

Mountain in the state of Maine

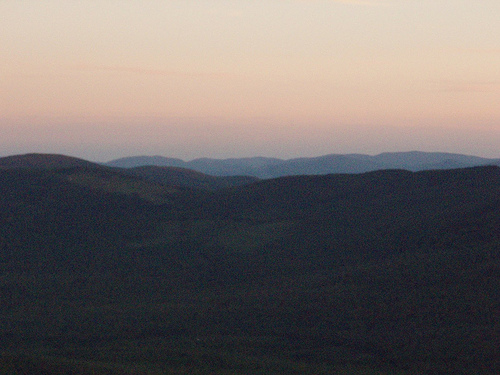
- Tumbledown Mountain at sunset

Highest point
- Elevation: 3,054 ft (931 m)
- Prominence: 1,400 ft (430 m)
- Coordinates: 44°45′03″N 70°32′50″W

Geography
- Location within Maine
- Location: Franklin County, Maine, U.S.

Climbing
- Easiest route: Hiking, class 1

Tumbledown Mountain is a mountain in Franklin County, Maine. The mountain is a popular hiking spot in western Maine, with trailheads located on Byron Road in unincorporated Township 6, north of Weld. It is distinguished by an alpine pond (known locally as Crater Lake or Tumbledown Pond) just below the summit. Tumbledown offers trails of varying difficulty for different hikers.

== Routes ==
=== Easy ===
According to hikers, the least strenuous route to the summit is to hike to Tumbledown pond via either the Brook or Parker Ridge trails. From the pond, hikers can access the summit via the Tumbledown Ridge Trail, a fairly well marked path that leads across the mountaintop all the way from the East Peak to the West Peak. It also connects to the Loop Trail, which descends steeply back to Byron Road. Weaker hikers should avoid the Loop Trail, as it can be a very challenging hike.

Brook Trail: The Brook trail begins approximately 4.5 miles down Byron Road. It is one of the most popular routes up Tumbledown. There is a large parking area located across the road from the trailhead, along with an outhouse for public use. The trail itself initially follows an old logging road before steeply ascending the mountain to Tumbledown pond. It is roughly 2.5 miles in length and takes approximately 2 hours to hike at a brisk pace.

Parker Ridge Trail: This trail is the oldest route to the pond. It gradually rises through the woods before leading up a steep, rocky ridgeline, then down to Tumbledown Pond. In the past, to access this route, hikers had to travel into the woods on a private road called the Morgan Road, and park near a place locally known as "Tumbledown Field." Tumbledown Field and the land surrounding it is all privately owned, and hikers are no longer encouraged to use the Morgan Road. Instead, hikers can now access Parker Ridge Trail directly from the Brook Trail parking lot. It is approximately a one-mile walk to the Parker Ridge trailhead from the Brook Trail parking lot. Hikers can also access the trail leading up Little Jackson Mountain from here as well. Total distance to the pond (including the access trail) is about 3.2 miles.

=== Hard ===
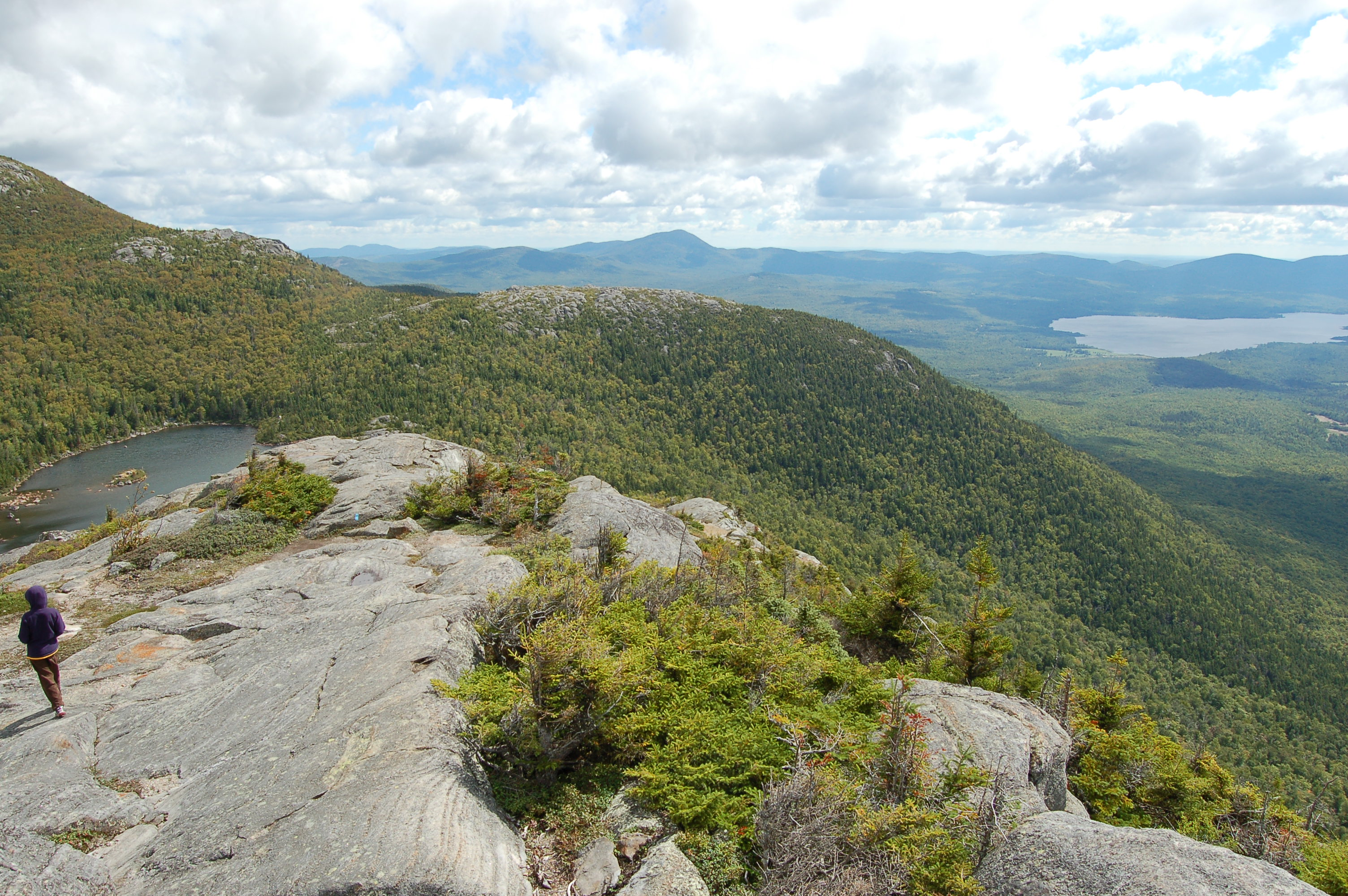
View from the summit of Tumbledown Mountain, showing Crater Lake (left) and Lake Webb (right)

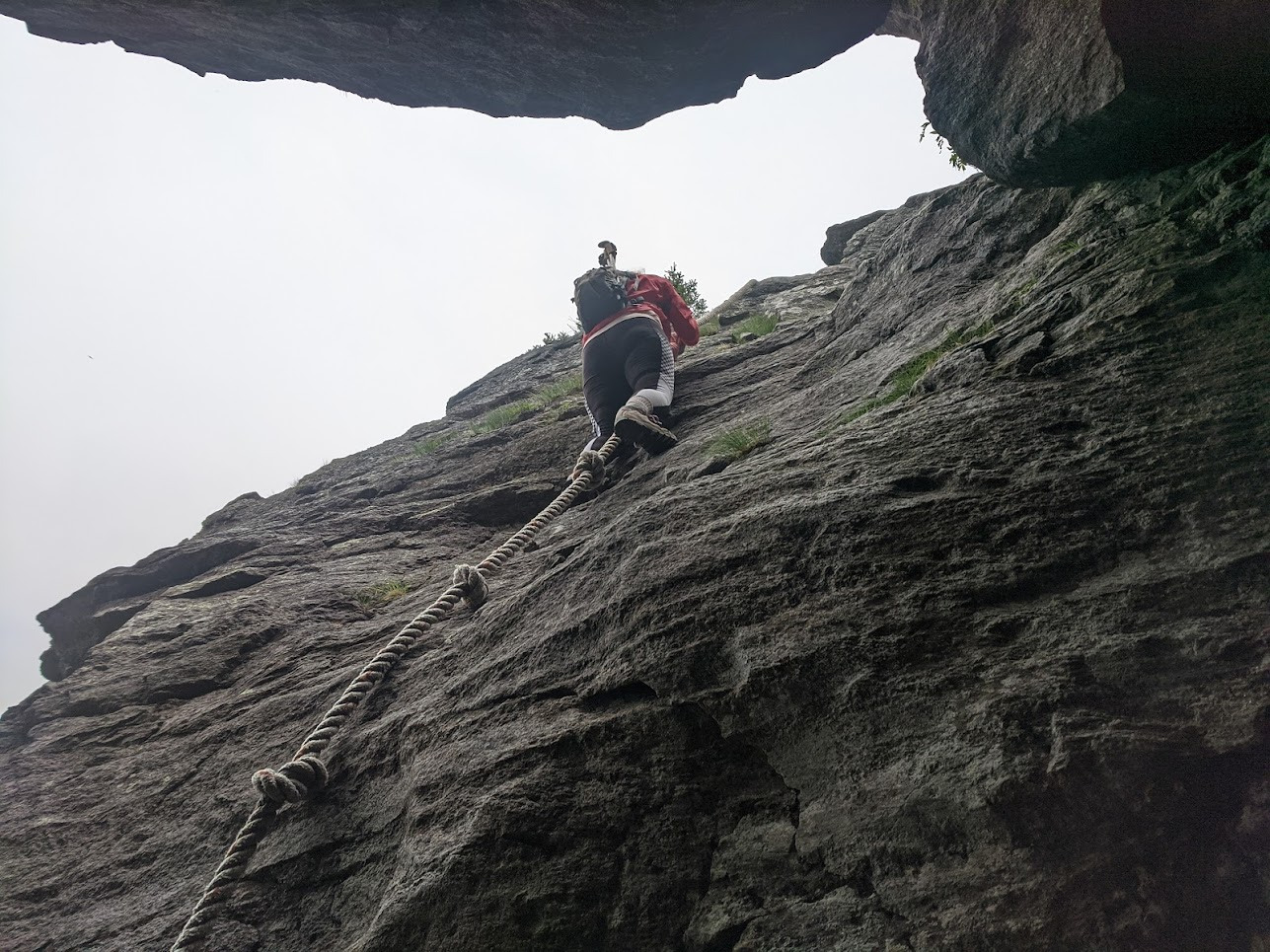
The rope section at the top of the derelict Chimney Trail

Loop Trail: The Loop Trail begins roughly 5.8 miles down the Byron Road roughly 1.5 miles beyond the Brook Trail. The trailhead is well-marked and has a parking area. This route is one of the most direct paths to the summit, as it rises steeply up the mountainside, eventually intersecting with the Tumbledown Ridge Trail, which provides access to the mountain's peaks. The trail itself is 2 rugged miles, and has views of the Tumbledown cliffs approximately one mile in. From there, the trail rises very steeply up a gully and requires a lot of boulder scrambling. Near the end, the trail actually goes up through a fissure between several boulders, creating a steep, chimney - like passage referred to in most guidebooks and web pages as "Fat Man's misery,". There are several iron rungs to assist hikers, but you must remove your backpack in order to fit through it. This makes having a partner very helpful. Claustrophobics should not climb this trail, nor should individuals who struggle with heights. Descending this trail is extremely tough and a bit dangerous. Hikers are better off ascending the Loop Trail and descending to the pond via Tumbledown Ridge Trail. From there, you can hike back to the Byron Road via the Brook Trail. The actual "Fat Man's Misery" is downhill and to the left of "The Chimney," is poorly marked, and opens into a cliff face.

Tumbledown Chimney Trail: This trail is considered derelict and should be avoided. It leaves the Loop Trail roughly one mile in, traveling through an extremely rough boulder field. From there, the trail climbs a severely steep, smooth rock slope. Eventually, it reaches the Tumbledown Chimney, which is approximately 15 feet high and very steep. A hand - over - hand climb via a fixed line is required to reach the top. Although the trail is still identified in some older guidebooks, it does not appear to be maintained any longer. Tumbledown is now regularly patrolled by rangers. Hikers should realize that climbing this trail is quite risky due to its steepness. Slabs of rock regularly fall here.

In 2009, a new rope was installed at the top of the Chimney Trail. As of December 2009, it was a purple synthetic rope tied off to the second of several iron rungs at the top. The trail itself is still unmaintained and hard to follow above the cliff wall and presumably the same below.
