= Von Sydow =

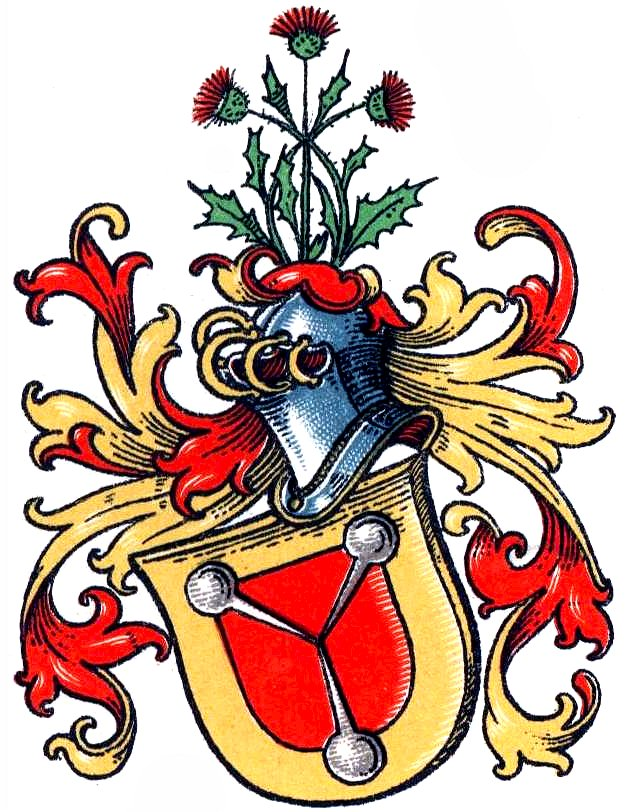
Coat of Arms of the German von Sydow family

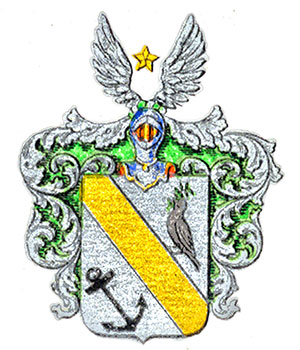
Coat of Arms of the Swedish von Sydow family

The Sydow family or simply von Sydow is the name of two noble families. One, belonging to an ancient nobility, originated in Brandenburg was part of the German nobility. The other, more recent one, also of German descent, hailing from Stettin, later moved to Sweden and became part of the Swedish nobility. According to an oral tradition, the Swedish family is related to the noble German family von Sydow, known since the 13th century. However, there is no written evidence for this.

== Notable members from the German family ==
- Emil von Sydow (1812–1873), German geographer
- Hans Joachim Friedrich von Sydow (1762–1823), Prussian general
- Rolf von Sydow (1924–2019), German film director

== Notable members from Swedish family ==
- Björn von Sydow (born 1945), Swedish politician
- Carl Wilhelm von Sydow (1878–1952), Swedish folklorist
- Ebba von Sydow (born 1981), Swedish journalist
- Erik von Sydow (1912–1997), Swedish diplomat
- Fredrik von Sydow (1908–1932), Swedish murderer
- Henrik von Sydow (born 1976), Swedish politician
- Hjalmar von Sydow (1862–1932), Swedish politician
- Max von Sydow (1929–2020), Swedish actor
- Oscar von Sydow (1873–1936), Swedish politician

== See also ==
- Sydow
