= Carl von Sydow =

Carl von Sydow may refer to:

- Carl Wilhelm von Sydow, Swedish folklorist
- Max von Sydow, actor, full name Carl Adolf von Sydow
