= Sydow =

Sydow is a surname. Notable people with the surname include:

- Christoph Sydow (1985–2020), German journalist
- Ellinor Südow (born 1998), Swedish professional golfer
- Hans Sydow (1879–1946), German mycologist, son of Paul
- Paul Sydow (1851–1925), German mycologist and lichenologist, father of Hans

== See also ==
- Von Sydow
