= Helena Henschen =

Swedish designer and writer (1940–2011)

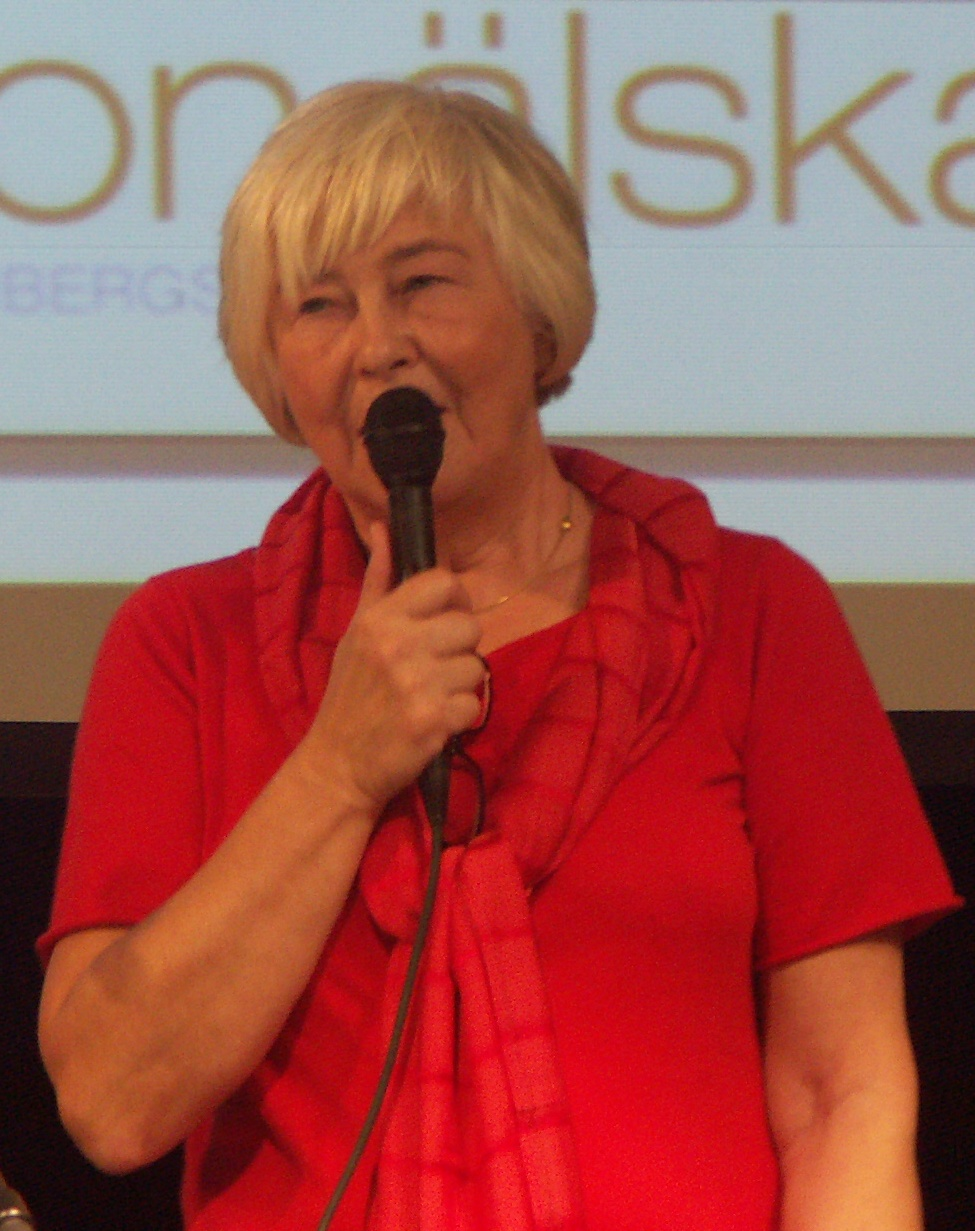
Helena Henschen

Helena Henschen (1940–2011) was a Swedish designer and writer.

== Biography ==
Born and raised in Stockholm, she worked as a graphic designer, achieving success as an illustrator of children's books. She co-founded the famous design company Mah-Jong.

She won the EU Prize for Literature for her novel I skuggan av ett brott (The Shadow of a Crime), dealing with the von Sydow murders.

Henschen was a niece of Fredrik von Sydow.
