= Memorate =

Term in folklore studies

A memorate is a term in folklore studies for a first-person personal experience narrative, typically presented as a truthful account of an extraordinary event (often but by no means always involving a supernatural being or paranormal occurrence). Memorates are usually told in the speaker's own voice and framed as something that happened to the narrator (or, in some usage, to someone the narrator knows closely), which distinguishes them from more fully traditionalized legends and other narrative genres.

== History ==
The concept is commonly traced to the Swedish folklorist Carl Wilhelm von Sydow, who introduced "memorate" as part of a broader effort to classify narrative forms by how they are transmitted and by their relationship to personal experience. Later scholars refined the term and debated its scope. For example, work associated with Lauri Honko and subsequent discussion has treated memorates as a key source for studying folk belief and vernacular interpretations of unusual experiences, while also noting that the definition has shifted across scholarly traditions. The term proved particularly important in Scandinavian folklore studies but has also been used increasingly in the Anglo-sphere.

== Usage ==
In research practice, memorates are used to examine how individuals narrate and interpret experiences within existing cultural frameworks, and how such accounts can circulate, accumulate variants, and sometimes develop into more widely shared traditional narratives.
