= Von Sydow murders =

Swedish criminal case

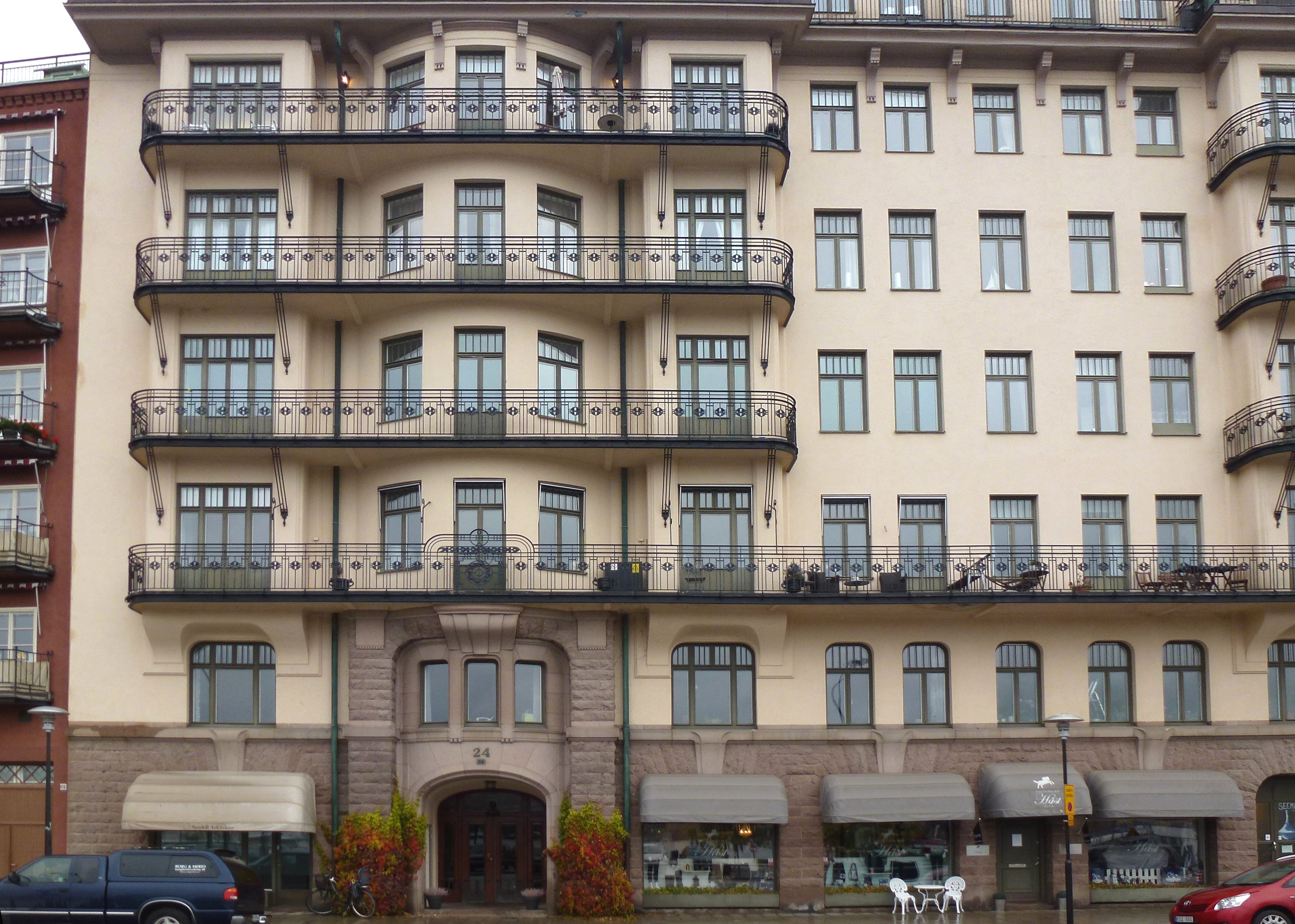
- Building at Norr Mälarstrand 24 where the first three murders were committed.
- Location: 59.32702°N 18.04546°E; Norr Mälarstrand 24, Stockholm, Sweden
- Date: 7 March 1932 c. 15:30–16:00 (CET)
- Target: Hjalmar von Sydow, Karolina Herou, Ebba Hamn, Ingun von Sydow
- Attack type: Blunt force trauma, shooting
- Weapon: Revolver
- Victims: 4
- Perpetrator: Fredrik von Sydow

The von Sydow murders, one of Sweden's most notorious criminal cases, occurred on 7 March 1932 in Stockholm.

== Events ==
On the night of 7 March 1932, Swedish politician Hjalmar von Sydow, his cook Karoline Herou, and his maid Ebba Hamn were all found beaten to death at Sydow's town house at Norr Mälarstrand in Stockholm. The bodies of Sydow and Herou were found in Herou's room; Hamn lay dead in Sydow's room. From the outset, it was presumed the murder weapon was an iron pipe, bought the day before the murders by Sydow's son, Fredrik von Sydow, but it was later determined that a flatiron, missing after the murders, was the real murder weapon.

A young niece of Sydow's late wife, who also lived at the home, discovered the bodies. Her account led the police to issue a warrant for the arrest of Fredrik von Sydow and his wife Ingun as the main suspects in the case. Immediately after the murders, the pair had travelled by taxi to meet competitive shooter Sven O. Hallman, a friend of Fredrik's, borrowing a gun from him. Afterwards, the pair went to the Tegner restaurant in Stockholm, then visited a men's clothing store, a pharmacy, yet another restaurant called Vallonen, and the Gillet restaurant in Uppsala, where they arrived at about 8 pm. They had arranged to have dinner with friends, and while the dinner was in progress, Fredrik shot his wife and then shot himself in the head.

== Motive ==
The motive for the murders remains unclear, but one possible scenario is that Fredrik was a drug user and had fallen into serious financial difficulties. Fredrik's relationship with his father was strained. These factors might have resulted in a desperate impulse to murder. According to the police, Fredrik had taken his father's wallet, which contained SEK 235 (equivalent to SEK 7,000 today) at the time of the murders.

== In fiction ==
The murders were the inspiration for Sigfrid Siwertz's play Ett brott ("A Crime"), which premiered on 13 October 1933 at the Lorensberg Theatre in Gothenburg. It was also performed at the Royal Dramatic Theatre in Stockholm on 15 March 1934, directed by Alf Sjöberg. In 1940 the play was the basis of a film, with the actors Edvin Adolphson and Karin Ekelund playing the lead roles.

A television film about the murders, Ett skuggspel ("A Shadow Play"), directed by Ingvar Skogsberg, was broadcast on SVT in 1985. The lead roles were played by Stefan Ekman and Jessica Zandén. In 2004, author Helena Henschen published her book I skuggan av ett brott ("In the shadow of a crime") about the murders. In 2006, the Uppsala City Theatre presented a play based upon the event titled von Sydowmordens gåta ("Mystery of the von Sydow Murdere"), prompting the journalist Karin Thunberg to interview the daughter of Fredrik and Ingun von Sydow to discuss how the murders had affected her life.

== Gallery ==
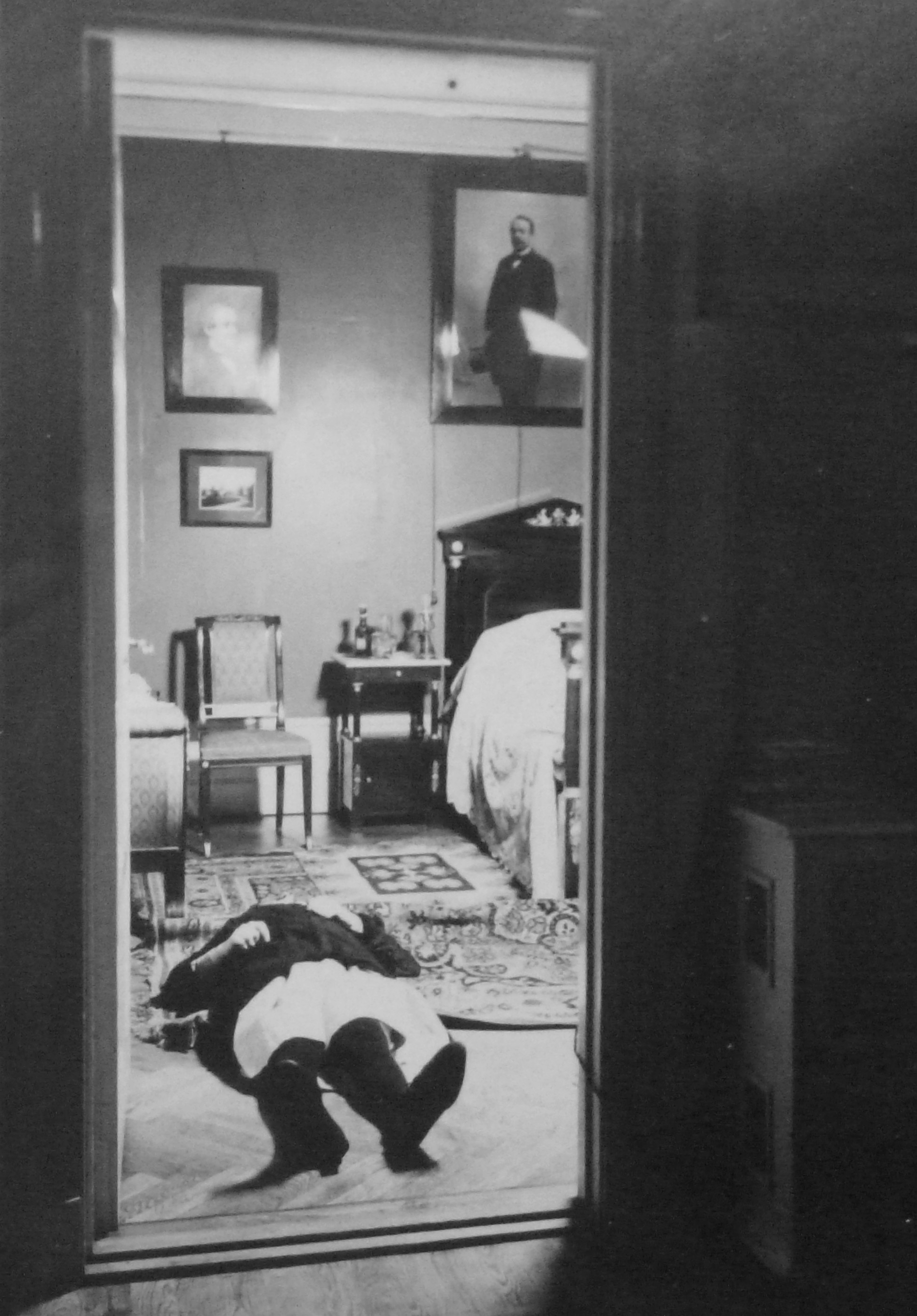
Ebba Hamn, one of the victims, at the scene

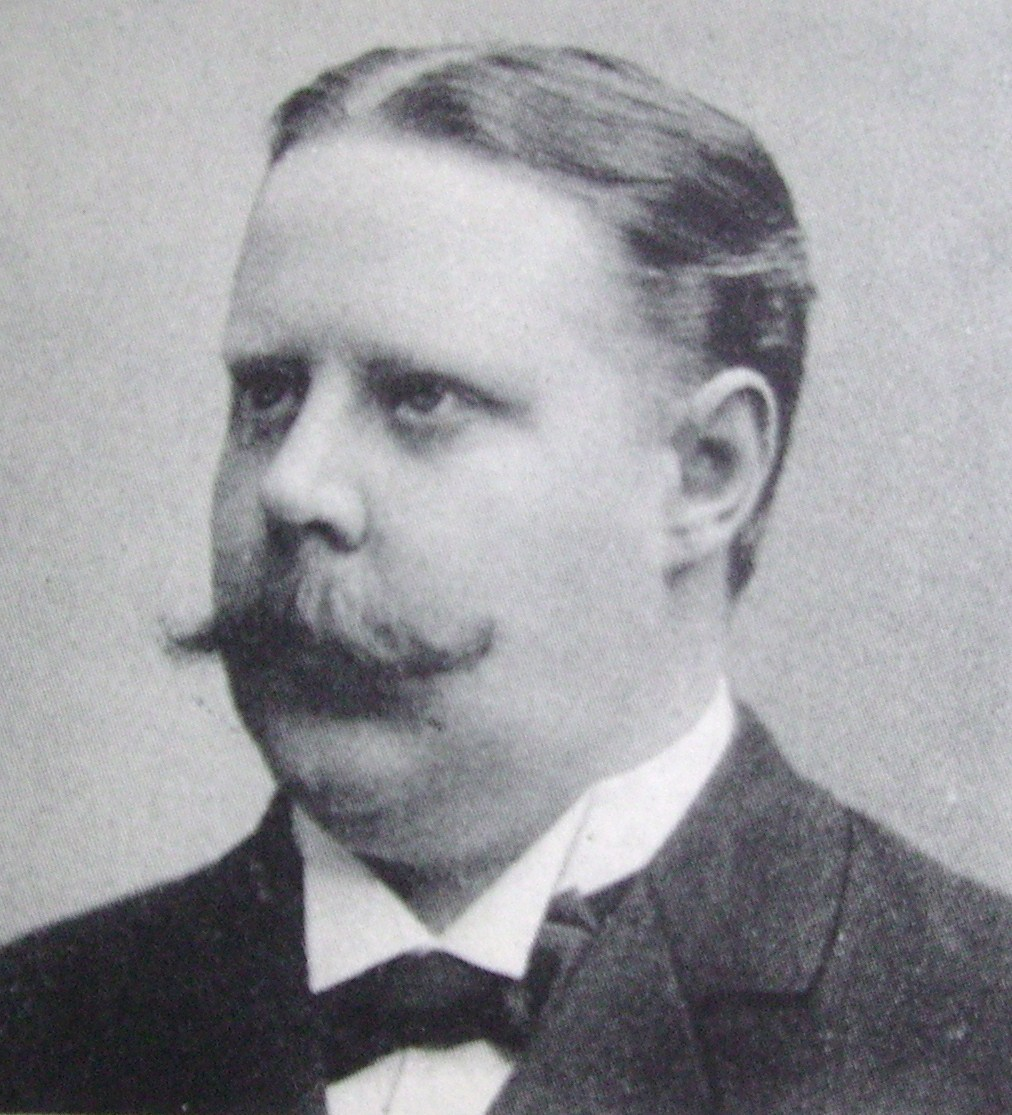
Hjalmar von Sydow, one of the murder victims

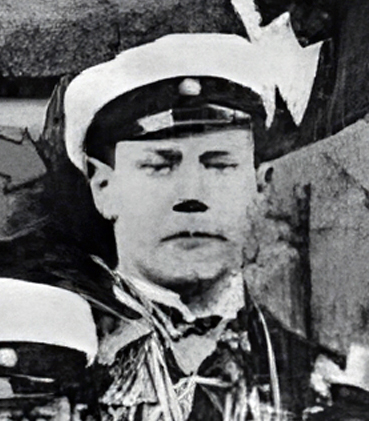
Fredrik von Sydow at his graduation on 12 March 1926

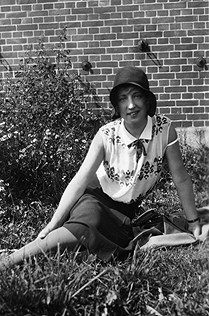
Ingun von Sydow

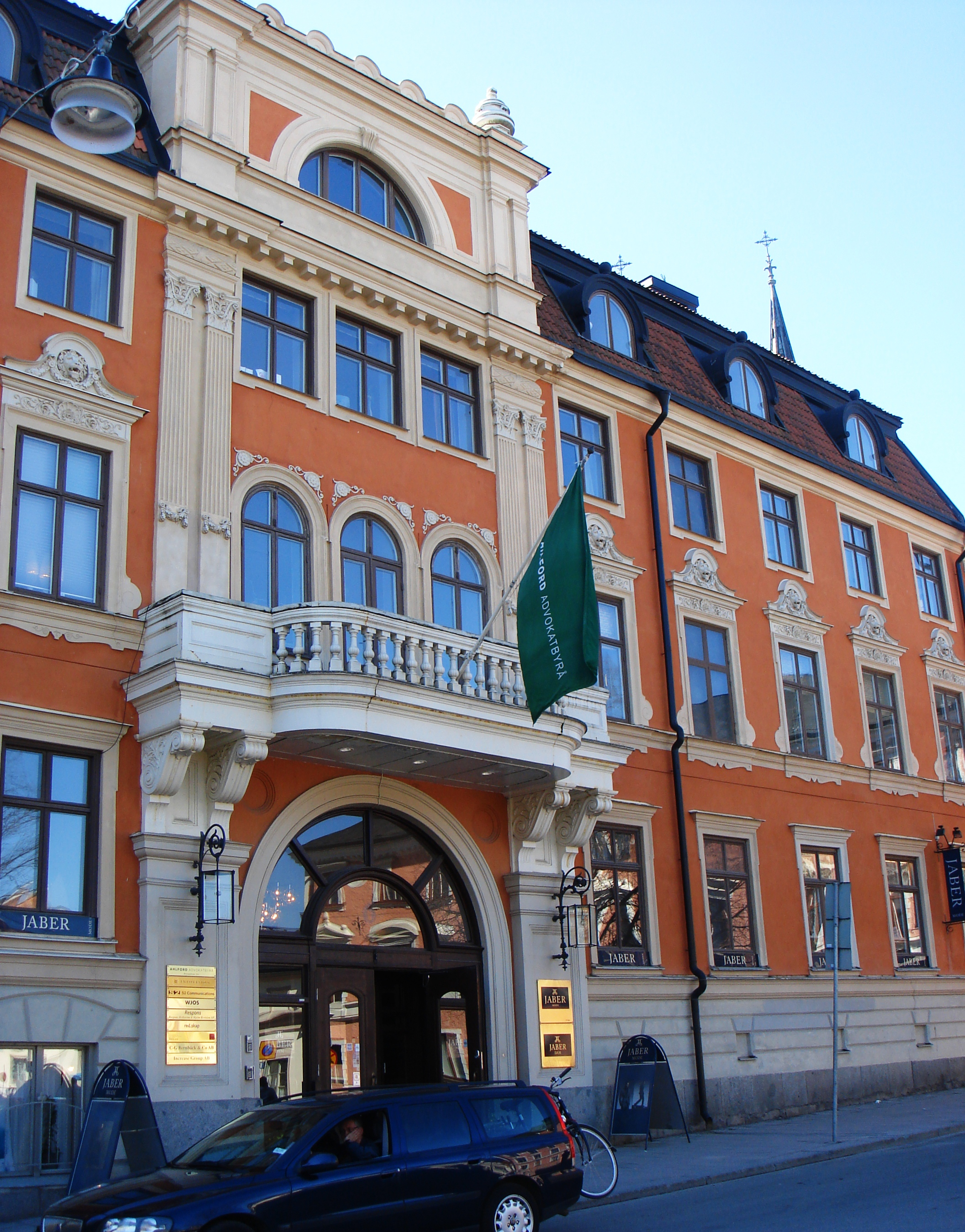
Hotell Gillet in Uppsala today

== See also ==
- List of unsolved murders (1900–1979)
