= Ellinor Südow =

Swedish professional golfer (born 1998)

Personal information
- Full name: Ellinor Josefina Südow
- Nationality: Sweden
- Born: 27 June 1998 (age 28) Helsingborg, Sweden
- Height: 5 ft 9 in (175 cm)

Career
- Sport: Golf
- College: University of North Carolina at Charlotte; University of Arizona
- Turned professional: 2022
- Current tours: Ladies European Tour (joined 2024); Epson Tour (joined 2024)
- Former tours: LPGA Tour (joined 2023); LET Access Series (joined 2022)

Ellinor Südow (born 27 June 1998) is a Swedish professional golfer who has played on the LPGA Tour and now plays on the Ladies European Tour.

== Early life and amateur career ==
Südow grew up in the fishing hamlet Lerberget in Höganäs Municipality. A niece of former LPGA Tour player Mikaela Parmlid, she did not take up golf until age 12, having previously focused on gymnastics. She joined Vasatorp Golf Club and competed nationally in both golf and badminton during high school.

In 2013 she won a title on the Skandia Tour, and in 2016 she claimed a title in the Junior Masters Invitational series.

Südow played college golf at University of North Carolina at Charlotte, joining the year women's golf was added to the Charlotte sports lineup, the 2017–18 school year. She helped Charlotte win their first ever team title with a tie for fourth at the Yale Invitational going 74-73-68 to earn her Conference USA Player of the Week.

In 2019, she experienced the 2019 University of North Carolina at Charlotte shooting and hid in a library on campus during the incident.

Südow joined the University of Arizona in 2021 and pursued a master's degree in business while training with the Arizona Wildcats women's golf team.

In 2021, Südow finished solo second at the Danish International Ladies Amateur Championship and solo third at the German International Amateur. She finished solo third in the 2022 Helen Holm Scottish Women's Open Championship.

== Professional career ==
Südow turned professional in 2022 and played on the LET Access Series, where she held the lead at the Västerås Ladies Open after an opening round of 69, and was a quarter finalist at the Big Green Egg Swedish Matchplay Championship.

She finished tied 17th at LPGA Tour Q-School to earn an LPGA Tour card for 2023. In her rookie season, she missed the cut in 10 of her 12 starts, but shared the lead at the ISPS Handa World Invitational after a first round 69, ultimately finishing in a tie for 48th, her best finish of the campaign. She was relegated to the Epson Tour for the 2024 season.

In 2023, she was part of the Swedish Golf Federation squad ahead of the 2024 Summer Olympics.

Südow earned her card for the 2024 Ladies European Tour at Q-School where she tied for 16th. She shared the halfway-stage lead at the 2025 Amundi German Masters and ultimately tied for 14th.

== Amateur wins ==
- 2013 Skandia Tour Skåne #4
- 2016 Innersvingen Junior Open
