= Hjalmar von Sydow =

Swedish lawyer and politician

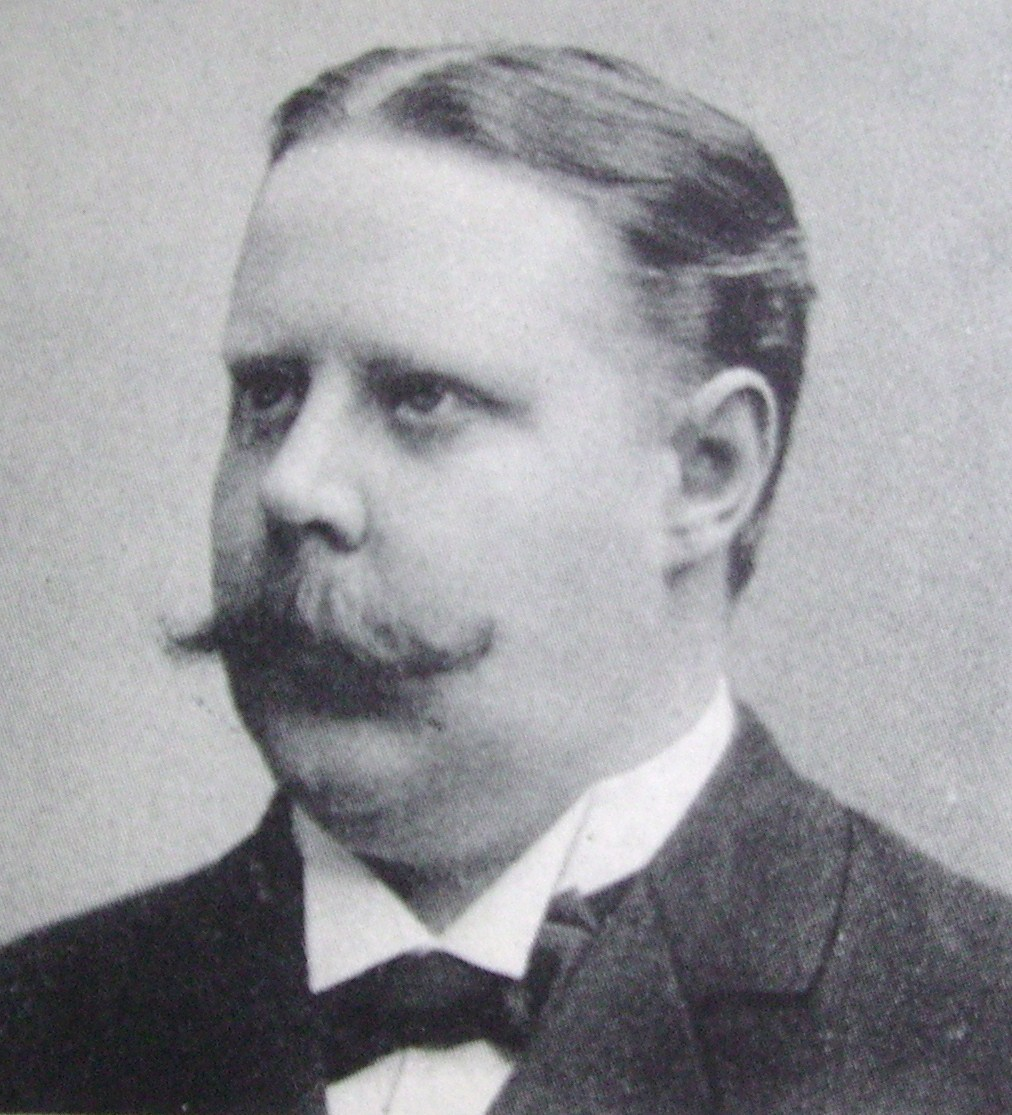
Hjalmar von Sydow

Adolf Hjalmar von Sydow (22 August 1862 – 7 March 1932) was a Swedish lawyer and politician.

== Biography ==
Adolf Hjalmar von Sydow was born in Växjö. He began studying law at Lund University in 1880, graduating in 1886. After practicing as a lawyer in Scania, he was made president of the Swedish Employers' Confederation in 1907, a position he held until 1931.

From 1916 until his death, von Sydow was a member of the First Chamber (upper house) of the Riksdag for the National Party. He was also a member of several government committees during his career.

== Death ==
On 7 March 1932, von Sydow, along with two of his employees, the cook Karoline Herou and the maid Ebba Hamn, were found beaten to death at his apartment in Stockholm. His son Fredrik von Sydow, the only suspect and the presumed murderer, committed suicide later the same day.

== Honours and awards ==
- Knight of the Order of Vasa (1901)

== Selected publications ==
- A. H. von Sydow, Om Stockholms rättskipning, polis och fångvård (Stockholm, 1897)
- A. H. von Sydow, Öfversikt af stadsfiskalernas i Stockholm ställning från äldsta till närvarande tid (Stockholm, 1897)
