= Carl Wilhelm von Sydow =

Swedish ethnologist (1878–1952)

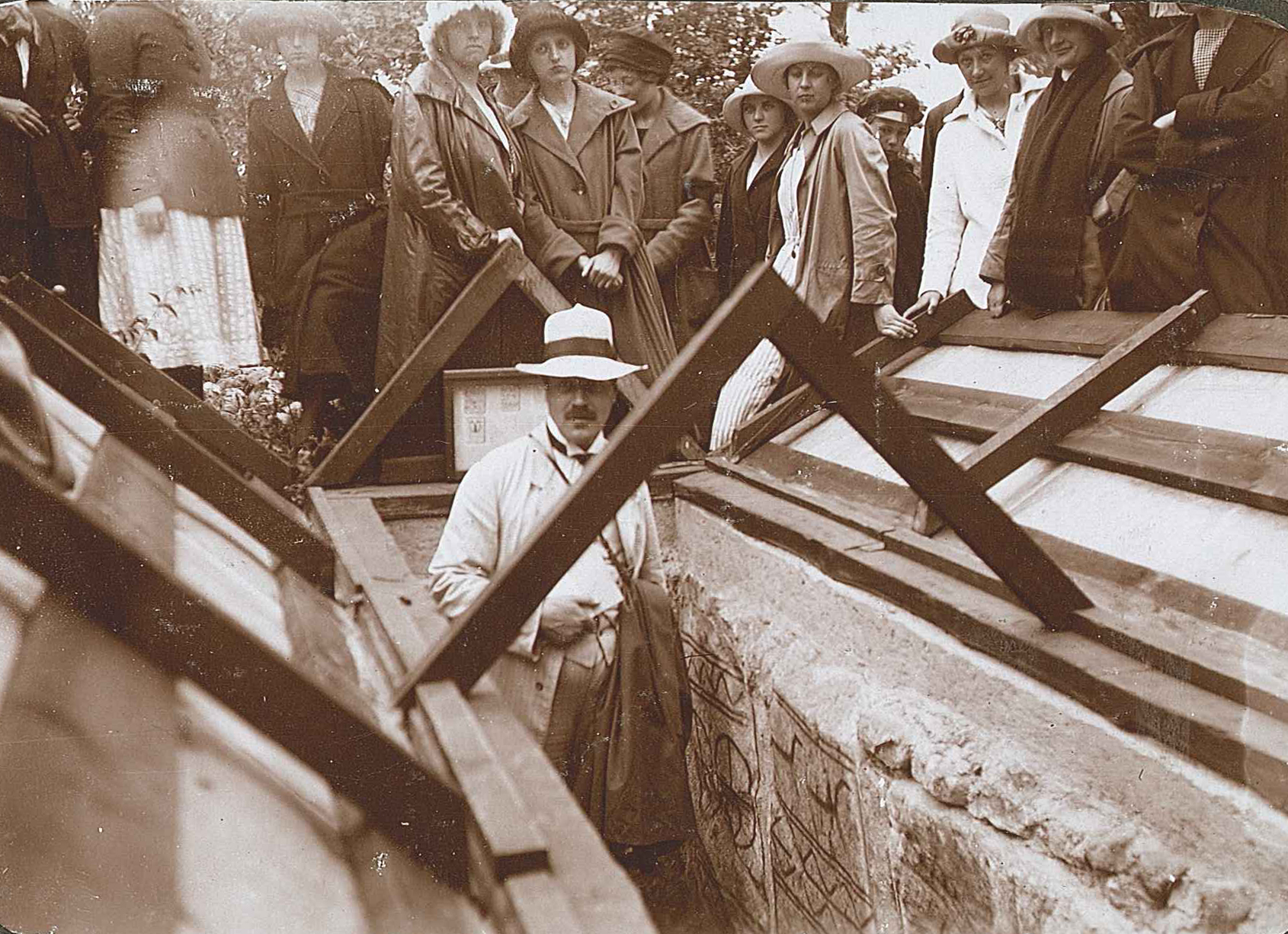
- Carl Wilhelm von Sydow (in trench) at the excavation of The King's Grave in Kivik, 1922
- Born: 21 December 1878; Ryssby, Kronoberg County, Sweden
- Died: 4 March 1952 (aged 73); Lund, Skåne County, Sweden
- Resting place: North Cemetery in Lund
- Education: Lund University
- Spouse(s): Anna von Sydow (m. 1906; died 1924) Greta von Sydow (m. 1926)
- Children: 2, including Max von Sydow
- Family: Von Sydow

Carl Wilhelm von Sydow (21 December 1878 – 4 March 1952) was a Swedish folklorist and professor at Lund University. Von Sydow was a pioneer of folklore studies in Sweden and contributed to establishing systematic methods in the field.

== Early life and education ==
Von Sydow was born on 21 December 1878 in Ryssby to Otto Ludvig von Sydow, a member of the Von Sydow family, and friherrinnan Göthilda Rappe.

Von Sydow was educated in Växjö. In 1897, Von Sydow entered Lund University and earned his master's degree in 1908 with a study of the legend of Finn and his wife and his doctorate in 1909 with a thesis titled Två spinnsagor—en studie i jämförande folksagoforskning (Two Spinning Legends—A Study in the Comparative Study of Folk Legends). During his university studies, he taught at folk high schools and met the Danish folklorist Henning Frederik Feilberg, who inspired him to begin collecting folk tales. In 1907 he published Våra folkminnen—Folksaga, folksägen, folktro (Our Folklore—Folktale, Legend, and Folk Belief) and participated in the founding of the Federation of Folklore Fellows' Communications in Copenhagen. Another folklorist who influenced him was Axel Olrik, who was to have been the disputant for his PhD thesis.

== Career ==
Von Sydow was appointed a lecturer in Nordic and comparative folkloristics at Lund University in September 1910, and became a professor in 1938. In April 1940 he was awarded a personal chair. He was a pioneer of radio lecturing, beginning in 1926. In 1914 he founded the journal Folkminnen och folktankar; in 1921 he became head of the foundation for the study of Swedish folklore established by Gunnar Olof Hyltén-Cavallius. He also advised the Swedish government on the formation of a commission to study peasant culture, which was established in 1924.

He was called up for national service during World War I. In the 1930s he was a founding member of the Nazi-sympathising Riksföreningen Sverige–Tyskland (National Swedish-German Association) and served as vice president, but in April 1940 he resigned his membership.

In addition to his publications on folklore, von Sydow contributed to the establishment of methodical study in the field in Sweden, and his work was influential in other countries, particularly Ireland; beginning with Tors färd till Utgård (Thor's Journey to Útgarð), one of his areas of particular interest was Celtic influence in Germanic folklore and literature, and Irish Gaelic was among several languages he learnt in adulthood and one he taught at Lund in the 1920s. An early interest in botany and zoology caused him to take a scientific approach to folklore study: in 1927 he originated the concept of the oicotype or ecotype, a form of a folktale which arose in adaptation to local circumstances, and suggested several other terms, such as dite (a saying) and memorate (a personal narrative, usually concerning a supernatural encounter). Starting in the 1920s, he came to regard many supernatural beings and customs in modern folk belief as ficts, fanciful explanations often meant to manage children by creating a bogeyman, and therefore came into conflict with other scholars' religio-historical theories, such as Wilhelm Mannhardt's analyses of harvest customs. He also came to repudiate the Finnish School in folklore studies as atomistic; he focussed on the transmission of folktales between individuals, for example drawing a distinction between 'active' and 'passive' tradition carriers or bearers (tale tellers and audience members).

== Personal life ==
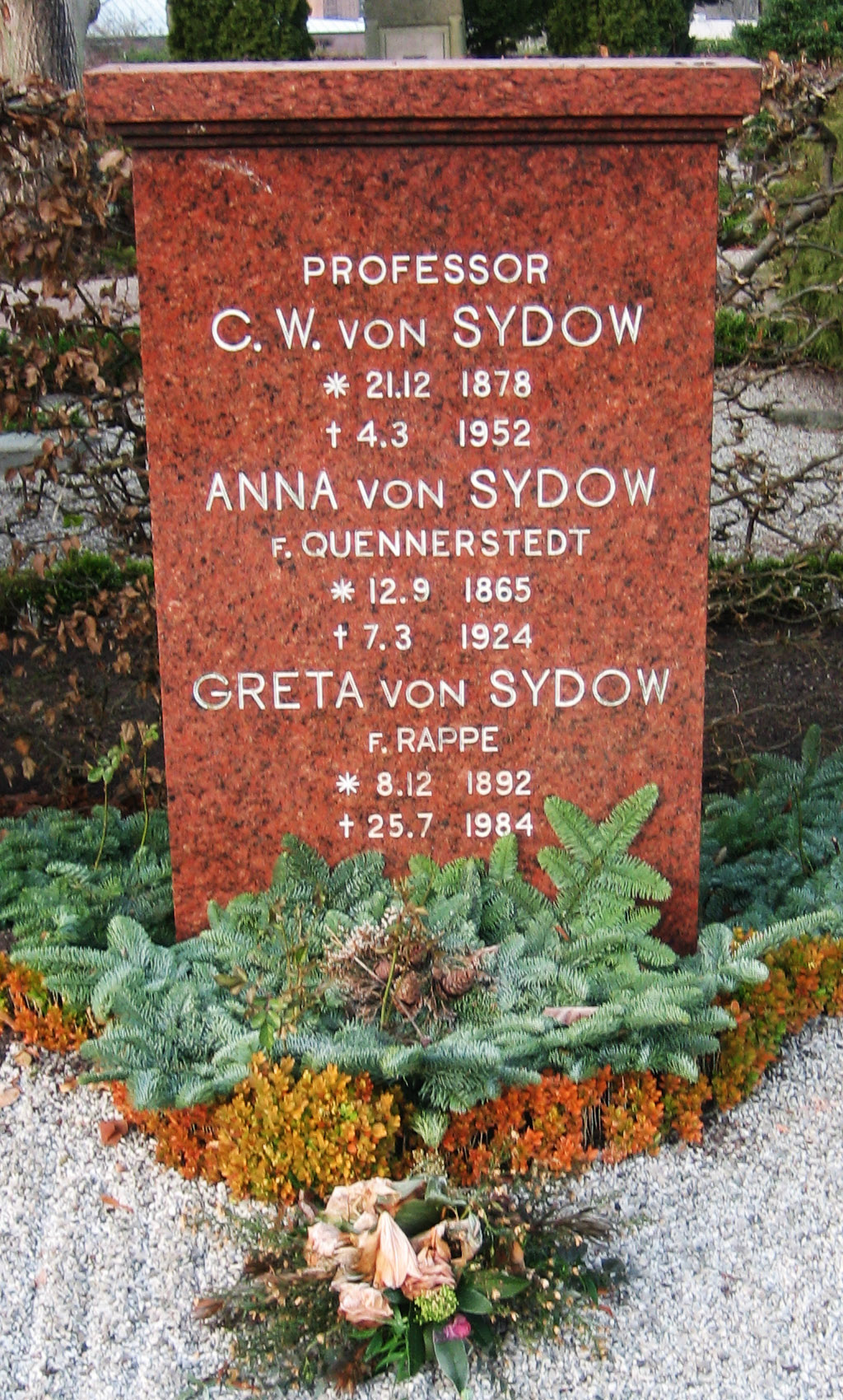
Von Sydow's grave at the North Cemetery in Lund

On 5 June 1906, Von Sydow married the painter Anna von Sydow (née Quennerstedt; 1865–1924). Von Sydow and Anna had one son.

On 10 June 1926, Von Sydow married his second cousin friherrinnan Maria Margareta "Greta" von Sydow (née Rappe), a folk high school teacher. Von Sydow and Greta had one son, the actor Max von Sydow.

On 4 March 1952 Von Sydow died in Lund, aged aged 73, and was buried in the family plot at the North Cemetery in Lund.

== Honours ==
- Honorary doctorate, National University of Ireland, 1937
