= List of county roads in Chisago County, Minnesota =

- Standard county road markers

Highway names
- Interstates: Interstate X (I-X)
- US Highways: U.S. Highway X (US X)
- State: Trunk Highway X (MN X or TH X)
- County State-Aid Highways: County State-Aid Highway X (CSAH X)
- County Roads: County Road X (CR X)

System links
- County roads of Minnesota; Chisago County

The following is a list of county-maintained highways in Chisago County, Minnesota, United States. Some of the routes in this list are also County State-Aid Highways (CSAH.)

== Route list ==
Number	Length (mi)	Length (km)	Southern or western terminus	Northern or eastern terminus	Local names	Formed	Removed	Notes
CSAH 1	7.0	11.3	Pine County line (County 1)	Bremer Avenue (County 30) in Rush City	Rush Lake Trail; Rush Lake Road	—	—	
CSAH 2	4.7	7.6	Isanti County line (County 4)	Rush Lake Trail (County 1) in Nessel Township	North Lake Drive	—	—	
CSAH 3	2.0	3.2	Falcon Avenue (County 9) in Nessel Township	Forest Boulevard (County 30) in Rushseba Township	530th Street	—	—	
CSAH 4	9.8	15.8	Stark Road (County 10) in Fish Lake Township	North Lake Drive (County 2) in Nessel Township	Acacia Trail	—	—	
CSAH 6	2.5	4.0	Isanti County Line (County 3)	Acacia Trail (County 4) near Rush Point	500th Street; Balsam Avenue; 492nd Street	—	—	
CSAH 7	10.0	16.1	Isanti County Line (County 6)	Bremer Avenue (County 30) in Rush City	Rush Point Drive	—	—	
CSAH 8	7.4	11.9	Isanti County Line (County 21)	Rush Point Drive (County 7) in Nessel Township	Cedarcrest Trail; Stark Road	—	—	
CSAH 9	30.3	48.8	US 8 in Center City	Pine County Line (County 23)	Andrews Avenue; Summit Avenue; 310th Street; Oasis Road; Sunrise Road; 440th Street; Galaxy Avenue; Goose Creek Road; Falcon Avenue; Rush Point Drive; Evergreen Avenue; Rush Lake Road	—	—	
CSAH 10	8.7	14.0	Isanti County Line (County 2)	Forest Boulevard (County 30) in Harris	Stark Road	—	—	
CSAH 11	6.9	11.1	Lincoln Road (County 14) in Lent Township	MN 95 at Almelund	Kost Trail; 375th Street	—	—	
CSAH 12	9.6	15.4	Oasis Road (County 9) in Chisago Lake Township	Reed Avenue (County 81) in Amador Township	315th Street; Park Trail	—	—	
CSAH 14	11.2	18.0	US 8 in Lindstrom	MN 95 in North Branch	Lincoln Road; Lincoln Trail; Grand Avenue	—	—	
CSAH 15	1.7	2.7	Washington County Line (County 15)	Green Lake Trail (County 23) in Chisago City	Manning Trail	—	—	
CSAH 16	10.9	17.5	MN 95 in Taylors Falls	Park Trail (County 12) in Amador Township	Chisago Street; Wild Mountain Road	—	—	
CSAH 17	2.0	3.2	Isanti County Line (County 9)	Forest Boulevard (County 30) in Lent Township	Athens Trail	—	—	
CSAH 18	4.6	7.4	Forest Boulevard (County 30) in Lent Township	Lincoln Road (County 14) in Lent Township	Lent Trail	—	—	
CSAH 19	8.9	14.3	Anoka County Line (County 36)	Lincoln Road (County 14) in Lindstrom	Fawn Lake Drive; Stacy Trail	—	—	
CSAH 20	13.4	21.6	US 8 in Lindstrom	MN 95 in Taylors Falls	North Lakes Trail; Furuby Road; Chestnut Street; 1st Street	—	—	
CSAH 21	5.2	8.4	Pleasant Valley Road (County 26) in Franconia Township	Furuby Road (County 20) in Shafer Township	Redwing Avenue	—	—	
CSAH 22	5.7	9.2	Anoka County Line (County 22)	Ivywood Trail (County 36) in Chisago City	Viking Boulevard; Forest Boulevard; Wyoming Trail	—	—	
CSAH 23	7.0	11.3	US 8 in Chisago City	Olinda Trail (County 25) in Chisago Lake Township	Green Lake Trail; Lofton Avenue; Chisago Boulevard	—	—	
CSAH 24	5.4	8.7	Chisago Boulevard (County 23) in Chisago Lake Township	Lincoln Road (County 14) in Chisago Lake Township	Lofton Avenue; Old Towne Road	—	—	
CSAH 25	7.2	11.6	Washington County Line (County 3)	US 8 in Lindstrom	Olinda Trail	—	—	
CSAH 26	6.3	10.1	MN 95 in Franconia Township	310th Street (County 37) in Chisago Lake Township	Pleasant Valley Road	—	—	
CSAH 27	0.8	1.3	Chisago Boulevard (County 23) in Chisago Lake Township	Olinda Trail (County 25) in Chisago Lake Township	Morgan Avenue	—	—	
CSAH 28	3.8	6.1	Stacy Trail (County 19) in Stacy	Athens Trail (County 17) in Lent Township	Falcon Avenue	—	—	
CSAH 30	27.6	44.4	US 61 in Wyoming	Pine County Line (County 61)	Forest Boulevard; Bremer Avenue	—	—	
CSAH 32	0.2	0.32	310th Street (County 9) in Center City	Dead end near 2nd Street in Center City	Main Street	—	—	
CSAH 36	4.7	7.6	Forest Boulevard (County 30) in Stacy	US 8 in Chisago City	295th Street; Ivywood Trail	—	—	
CSAH 37	7.6	12.2	Oasis Road (County 9) in Center City	Chestnut Street (County 20) in Taylors Falls	310th Street; 1st Street	—	—	
CSAH 39	2.7	4.3	Rush Point Drive (County 7) in Rush City	530th Street (County 3) in Rushseba Township	Fairfield Avenue	—	—	
CR 55	3.3	5.3	Forest Boulevard (County 30) in Rush City	530th Street (County 56) in Rushseba Township	4th Street; Rushseba Trail; Government Road	—	—	
CR 56	13.2	21.2	Government Road (County 57) in Sunrise Township	Forest Boulevard (County 30) in Rushseba Township	468th Street; Kelly Avenue; 475th Street; River Road; 530th Street	—	—	
CR 57	7.1	11.4	Sunrise Road (County 9) in Sunrise Township	Forest Boulevard (County 30) in Rushseba Township	Government Road; 490th Street	—	—	
CR 59	2.9	4.7	Galaxy Avenue (County 9) in Harris	Government Road (County 57) in Sunrise Township	460th Street	—	—	
CR 60	4.6	7.4	Stark Road (County 10) in Fish Lake Township	Goose Creek Road (County 9) in Harris	Deerwood Trail; 470th Street	—	—	
CR 63	3.2	5.1	Acacia Trail (County 4) in Fish Lake Township	Cedarcrest Trail (County 8) near Stark	Deerwood Trail; 470th Street	—	—	
CR 64	1.7	2.7	425th Street (County 65) in Harris	Stark Road (County 10) in Harris	Falcon Avenue	—	—	
CR 65	2.4	3.9	Flink Avenue in North Branch	Stark Road (County 10) in Harris	Flink Avenue; 425th Street; Elmcrest Avenue	—	—	
CR 67	5.2	8.4	375th Street (County 72) in North Branch	Sunrise Road (County 9) in Sunrise Township	Keystone Avenue	—	—	
CR 68	3.7	6.0	Elmcrest Avenue in Lent Township	MN 95 in North Branch	Elmcrest Avenue; 370th Street; Falcon Avenue	—	—	
CR 70	4.0	6.4	375th Street (County 11) in Amador Township	310th Street (County 81) in Amador Township	Oriole Avenue	—	—	
CR 71	3.6	5.8	Chestnut Street (County 20) in Taylors Falls	Wild Mountain Road (County 16) in Shafer Township	Mulberry Street; Vista Road; 347th Street	—	—	
CR 72	3.4	5.5	Lincoln Trail (County 14) in North Branch	Kost Trail (County 11) in Sunrise Township	375th Street	—	—	
CR 74	2.4	3.9	Lincoln Road (County 14) in Chisago Lake Township	Oasis Road (County 9) in Chisago Lake Township	347th Street	—	—	
CR 76	2.1	3.4	Furuby Road (County 20) in Shafer Township	MN 95 in Shafer Township	Redwing Avenue; 350th Street	—	—	
CR 78	1.3	2.1	Athens Trial (County 17) in Lent Township	360th Street in Lent Township	Falcon Avenue	—	—	
CR 79	3.6	5.8	MN 95 in Shafer Township	Vista Road (County 71) in Shafer Township	350th Street; Tern Avenue; 345th Street	—	—	
CR 81	10.7	17.2	MN 95 in Amador Township	Sunrise Road (County 9) near Sunrise	Reed Avenue; 410th Street	—	—	
CR 86	5.4	8.7	Olinda Trail (County 25) in Franconia Township	Pleasant Valley Road (County 26) in Franconia Township	Panola Drive; St. Croix Trail; Redwing Avenue	—	—	
CR 91	3.0	4.8	Washington County Line (County 91)	Green Lake Trail (County 23) in Chisago Lake Township	Lofton Avenue	—	—	
CR 93	3.0	4.8	Bremer Avenue (County 30) in Rush City	River Road (County 56) in Rushseba Township	500th Street	—	—	
CR 94	2.5	4.0	Rush Lake Trail (County 1) in Nessel Township	Falcon Avenue (County 9) in Nessel Township	527th Street; Elmcrest Avenue; 530th Street	—	—	
Former
