= National Register of Historic Places listings in Chisago County, Minnesota =

Location of Chisago County in Minnesota

This is a list of the National Register of Historic Places listings in Chisago County, Minnesota. It is intended to be a complete list of the properties and districts on the National Register of Historic Places in Chisago County, Minnesota, United States. The locations of National Register properties and districts for which the latitude and longitude coordinates are included below, may be seen in an online map.

There are 18 properties and districts listed on the National Register in the county. A supplementary list includes three additional sites that were formerly listed on the National Register.

This National Park Service list is complete through NPS recent listings posted October 23, 2026.

== History ==
Chisago County's National Register properties reflect its role as an early focus of Euro-American settlement in Minnesota and its evolving land use. An intensive logging industry beginning in the 1830s gave way to agriculture, spurred by railroad access and increased European immigration—particularly Swedish immigration—by the 1870s. Several properties reflect the prosperity achieved by several individuals of this period in the county's booming trackside towns. Around the beginning of the 20th century, Chisago County developed a modest resort and tourism industry.

== Current listings ==
	Name on the Register	Image	Date listed	Location	City or town	Description
1	Gustaf Anderson House	Gustaf Anderson House	July 21, 1980 (#80002000)	13045 Lake Blvd. 45°23′24″N 92°50′33″W	Lindström	1879 brick Italianate house of a notable settler and land speculator. Now a Chisago County Historical Society museum.
2	Angel's Hill Historic District	Angel's Hill Historic District	April 11, 1972 (#72000675)	Roughly bounded by Military Rd. and Mill, Mulberry, and Government Sts. 45°24′01″N 92°39′18″W	Taylors Falls	Architecturally cohesive mid-19th-century neighborhood of New England-style Greek Revival buildings, with 28 contributing properties including the 1854 Folsom House.
3	Archeological Site No. 21CH23	Archeological Site No. 21CH23	January 16, 1989 (#88003129)	Address restricted	Taylors Falls	Shell midden accumulated from 600 to 1499 CE with very few artifacts, indicating a briefly but repeatedly used site for harvesting mussels that could illuminate Woodland period subistence and settlement patterns.
4	J.C. Carlson House	J.C. Carlson House	July 21, 1980 (#80002004)	640 Bremer Ave. S. 45°40′59″N 92°57′41″W	Rush City	1899 Queen Anne house designed by Augustus F. Gauger for the leading entrepreneur of Chisago County's leading railroad town.
5	Center City Historic District	Center City Historic District	July 21, 1980 (#80001996)	Summit Ave. 45°23′39″N 92°49′00″W	Center City	Chisago County's best-preserved late-19th/early-20th-century residential district, whose 19 houses and one church also reflect the area's Swedish Lutheran heritage.
6	John Daubney House	John Daubney House	July 21, 1980 (#80002008)	767 River St. 45°24′35″N 92°39′02″W	Taylors Falls	Circa-1870 Italianate house purchased by a prominent early settler for his retirement in 1893.
7	Franconia Historic District	Franconia Historic District	June 17, 1980 (#80000406)	Roughly Cornelian, Summer, and Henry Sts. 45°22′11″N 92°41′36″W	Franconia	Community of seven houses built 1850s–1880s embodying pioneer settlement on the St. Croix River.
8	Grant House	Grant House	July 21, 1980 (#80002005)	80 W. 4th St. 45°41′05″N 92°57′43″W	Rush City	Longstanding hotel built in 1896 during Rush City's peak as a stop on the St. Paul and Duluth Railroad.
9	Interstate State Park CCC/WPA/Rustic Style Campground	Interstate State Park CCC/WPA/Rustic Style Campground	June 11, 1992 (#92000638)	Off U.S. Route 8; 45°23′33″N 92°40′08″W	Taylors Falls vicinity	Six park structures built 1938–1941 significant as examples of New Deal federal work relief, early state park development, National Park Service rustic design, and landscape architecture.
10	Interstate State Park WPA/Rustic Style Historic District	Interstate State Park WPA/Rustic Style Historic District	June 11, 1992 (#89001664)	Off U.S. Route 8; 45°24′00″N 92°39′04″W	Taylors Falls vicinity	Six park structures built 1920–1939 significant as examples of New Deal federal work relief, early state park development, National Park Service rustic design, and landscape architecture.
11	Frank A. Larson House	Frank A. Larson House	July 21, 1980 (#80002001)	12625 Newell Ave. 45°23′18″N 92°51′02″W	Lindström	Circa-1898 summer home noted for its association with the local resort and tourism industry and its especially picturesque design.
12	Moody Barn	Moody Barn	July 21, 1980 (#80001998)	24201 County Highway 24; 45°18′07″N 92°52′15″W	Chisago Lake Township	1915 round barn, prominent symbol of Chisago County's early-20th-century dairy farming industry. Now a Chisago County Historical Society property.
13	Paul Munch House	Paul Munch House	May 4, 1976 (#76001050)	Summer St. 45°22′16″N 92°41′39″W	Franconia	Rare Minnesota example, built c. 1855, of an affluent, late Greek Revival-style house. Also a contributing property to the Franconia Historic District.
14	Munch-Roos House	Munch-Roos House	November 20, 1970 (#70000289)	190 2nd St. 45°24′13″N 92°39′08″W	Taylors Falls	Rare intact example, built 1853, of the modest Greek Revival houses once common in Minnesota Territory.
15	Point Douglas to Superior Military Road: Deer Creek Section	Point Douglas to Superior Military Road: Deer Creek Section	February 7, 1991 (#90002200)	Off County Highway 16; 45°30′22″N 92°43′04″W	Amador Township	1853 section of the Point Douglas to Superior Military Road, some of the first transportation infrastructure in Minnesota. Now part of Wild River State Park's trail system.
16	Sayer House	Sayer House	July 21, 1980 (#80002002)	43959 Forest Blvd. 45°35′09″N 92°58′27″W	Harris	Large Italianate house/inn built c. 1875, dating to a period of land speculation as Chisago County was settled. Also known as the George Flanders House.
17	Taylors Falls Public Library	Taylors Falls Public Library	October 15, 1970 (#70000290)	473 Bench St. 45°24′14″N 92°39′10″W	Taylors Falls	Example of an early small-town library as well as Carpenter Gothic and Stick style architecture, stemming from an 1887 conversion of an 1854 building.
18	Charles A. Victor House	Charles A. Victor House	July 21, 1980 (#80002003)	30495 Park St. 45°23′21″N 92°50′53″W	Lindström	Circa-1905 house of one of the entrepreneurs who helped develop their respective Chisago County towns.

== Former listings ==
	Name on the Register	Image	Date listed	Date removed	Location	City or town	Description
1	Aaron Diffenbacher Farmhouse		July 21, 1980 (#80002007)	June 22, 1998	County Highway 5	Rushseba Township	Greek Revival farmhouse built c. 1868. Burned down by an accidental fire on April 3, 1985.
2	Chisago County Courthouse	Chisago County Courthouse	July 21, 1980 (#80001997)	September 17, 1990	Main St. (original address); Current coordinates are 45°27′50″N 92°44′33″W	Center City	1876 courthouse. Moved in 1990 for a new government center; now located on the Almelund Threshing Show Grounds with other preserved buildings.
3	Johnson Block	Johnson Block	July 31, 1980 (#80002006)	May 15, 1987	4th St. and Ave. D	Rush City	Prominent 1897 Romanesque Revival commercial building. Destroyed by a fire in 1981.

== See also ==
- List of National Historic Landmarks in Minnesota
- National Register of Historic Places listings in Minnesota
