= Palmdale, Minnesota =

Unincorporated community in Minnesota, United States

Palmdale
- Unincorporated community
- Location within Minnesota Location within the United States
- Coordinates: 45°27′20″N 92°44′01″W
- Country: United States
- State: Minnesota
- County: Chisago County
- Township: Shafer Township
- Elevation: 935 ft (285 m)
- Time zone: UTC-6 (Central (CST))
  - Summer (DST): UTC-5 (CDT)
- ZIP code: 55084
- Area code: 651
- GNIS feature ID: 654868

Palmdale is an unincorporated community in Shafer Township, Chisago County, Minnesota, United States.

The community is located north of Taylors Falls at the junction of State Highway 95 (MN 95) and 350th Street. Dry Creek flows through the community. Nearby places include Taylors Falls, Shafer, Center City, Almelund, North Branch, and Wild Mountain Ski Recreation Area.

ZIP codes 55084 (Taylors Falls) and 55074 (Shafer) intersect near Palmdale.
