= Chisago Lake Township, Chisago County, Minnesota =

Township in Minnesota, United States

Chisago Lake Township
- Township
- Location within the state of Minnesota
- Coordinates: 45°23′35″N 92°51′17″W
- Country: United States
- State: Minnesota
- County: Chisago

Area
  - Total: 52.6 sq mi (136.2 km^{2})
  - Land: 43.2 sq mi (112.0 km^{2})
  - Water: 9.3 sq mi (24.1 km^{2})
- Elevation: 892 ft (272 m)

Population (2010)
  - Total: 4,656
  - Density: 108/sq mi (41.6/km^{2})
- Time zone: UTC-6 (Central (CST))
  - Summer (DST): UTC-5 (CDT)
- ZIP code: 55012
- Area code: 651
- FIPS code: 27-11368
- GNIS feature ID: 0663798
- Website: https://www.chisagolaketownship.com/

Chisago Lake Township is a township in Chisago County, Minnesota, United States. The population was 4,656 at the 2010 census, up from 3,276 in 2000.

== History ==
Chisago Lake Township was organized in 1858. It took its name from nearby Chisago Lake.

== Geography ==
The township is located in southern Chisago County, between Lent Township and Chisago City to the west, Shafer Township and Franconia Township to the east, Sunrise Township and Amador Township to the north, and the city of Scandia in Washington County to the south. The cities of Lindstrom and Center City are near the center of the township but administratively separate.

U.S. Highway 8 crosses the township, leading east to St. Croix Falls, Wisconsin, and southwest to Forest Lake.

According to the United States Census Bureau, the township has a total area of 52.6 square miles (136.2 km^{2}), of which 43.2 square miles (112.0 km^{2}) is land and 9.3 square miles (24.1 km^{2}), or 17.73%, is water. There are more than 20 lakes in the township, the largest of which are Sunrise Lake, North and South Center Lakes, North and South Lindstrom Lakes, Kroon Lake, Linn Lake, Chisago Lake, and Green Lake.

== Demographics ==
Historical population
| Census | Pop. | Note | %± |
|---|---|---|---|
| 1860 | 347 | | — |
| 1870 | 775 | | 123.3% |
| 1880 | 1,362 | | 75.7% |
| 1890 | 1,561 | | 14.6% |
| 1900 | 1,728 | | 10.7% |
| 1910 | 1,589 | | −8.0% |
| 1920 | 1,632 | | 2.7% |
| 1930 | 1,513 | | −7.3% |
| 1940 | 1,488 | | −1.7% |
| 1950 | 1,385 | | −6.9% |
| 1960 | 1,643 | | 18.6% |
| 1970 | 2,319 | | 41.1% |
| 1980 | 2,629 | | 13.4% |
| 1990 | 3,057 | | 16.3% |
| 2000 | 3,276 | | 7.2% |
| 2010 | 4,656 | | 42.1% |
U.S. Decennial Census

As of the census of 2000, there were 3,276 people, 1,127 households, and 926 families residing in the township. The population density was 70.9 inhabitants per square mile (27.4/km^{2}). There were 1,269 housing units at an average density of 27.5 per square mile (10.6/km^{2}). The racial makeup of the township was 99.18% White, 0.34% African American, 0.12% Native American, 0.06% Asian, 0.03% from other races, and 0.27% from two or more races. Hispanic or Latino of any race were 0.82% of the population.

There were 1,127 households, out of which 42.1% had children under the age of 18 living with them, 74.8% were married couples living together, 3.6% had a female householder with no husband present, and 17.8% were non-families. 14.3% of all households were made up of individuals, and 4.0% had someone living alone who was 65 years of age or older. The average household size was 2.89 and the average family size was 3.21.

In the township the population was spread out, with 30.3% under the age of 18, 5.4% from 18 to 24, 31.4% from 25 to 44, 25.1% from 45 to 64, and 7.8% who were 65 years of age or older. The median age was 37 years. For every 100 females, there were 112.9 males. For every 100 females age 18 and over, there were 112.1 males.

The median income for a household in the township was $65,858, and the median income for a family was $67,458. Males had a median income of $45,867 versus $29,886 for females. The per capita income for the township was $23,019. About 1.0% of families and 1.8% of the population were below the poverty line, including 0.6% of those under age 18 and 0.9% of those age 65 or over.

== In popular culture ==
Chisago Lake, then Ki Chi Saga, was the location where the main characters of the epic Swedish novel The Emigrants settled.

== See also ==
- Moody Barn
