= Shafer Township, Chisago County, Minnesota =

Township in Minnesota, United States

Shafer Township
- Township
- Location within the state of Minnesota
- Coordinates: 45°25′35″N 92°42′15″W
- Country: United States
- State: Minnesota
- County: Chisago

Area
  - Total: 29.3 sq mi (75.8 km^{2})
  - Land: 28.9 sq mi (74.8 km^{2})
  - Water: 0.39 sq mi (1.0 km^{2})
- Elevation: 925 ft (282 m)

Population (2010)
  - Total: 1,048
  - Density: 36/sq mi (14/km^{2})
- Time zone: UTC-6 (Central (CST))
  - Summer (DST): UTC-5 (CDT)
- ZIP code: 55074
- Area code: 651
- FIPS code: 27-59332
- GNIS feature ID: 0665580
- Website: https://www.shafertownship.org/

Shafer Township is a township in Chisago County, Minnesota, United States. The population was 1,048 as of the 2010 census, up from 646 in 2000.

== Geography ==
Shafer Township is located in southeast Chisago County, bordered to the east by the city of Taylors Falls and the St. Croix River, which is the Minnesota–Wisconsin border. The city of Shafer is in the southwest part of the township but an administratively separate entity. The unincorporated community of Palmdale is in the north.

U.S. Highway 8 follows most of the southern boundary of the township, turning northeast to travel to Taylors Falls, then across the river to St. Croix Falls, Wisconsin, and leading west to Lindstrom and Chisago City. State Highway 95 (MN 95) crosses the north part of the township, passing through Palmdale and leading southeast to Taylors Falls and northwest to North Branch.

According to the United States Census Bureau, Shafer Township has a total area of 29.3 square miles (75.8 km^{2}), of which 28.9 square miles (74.8 km^{2}) is land and 0.39 square miles (1.0 km^{2}), or 1.32%, is water.

== Demographics ==
Historical population
Census	Pop.	Note	%±
1860	453		—
1870	1,003		121.4%
1880	580		−42.2%
1890	812		40.0%
1900	896		10.3%
1910	862		−3.8%
1920	927		7.5%
1930	758		−18.2%
1940	698		−7.9%
1950	633		−9.3%
1960	583		−7.9%
1970	636		9.1%
1980	768		20.8%
1990	727		−5.3%
2000	646		−11.1%
2010	1,048		62.2%
U.S. Decennial Census

As of the census of 2000, there were 646 people, 219 households, and 180 families residing in the township. The population density was 21.6 people per square mile (8.3/km^{2}). There were 233 housing units at an average density of 7.8/sq mi (3.0/km^{2}). The racial makeup of the township was 97.83% White, 1.24% Asian, 0.15% from other races, and 0.77% from two or more races. Hispanic or Latino of any race were 0.31% of the population.

There were 219 households, out of which 41.1% had children under the age of 18 living with them, 70.8% were married couples living together, 9.1% had a female householder with no husband present, and 17.8% were non-families. 14.6% of all households were made up of individuals, and 6.4% had someone living alone who was 65 years of age or older. The average household size was 2.95 and the average family size was 3.29.

In the township the population was spread out, with 29.7% under the age of 18, 5.9% from 18 to 24, 30.2% from 25 to 44, 25.1% from 45 to 64, and 9.1% who were 65 years of age or older. The median age was 38 years. For every 100 females, there were 97.0 males. For every 100 females age 18 and over, there were 98.3 males.

The median income for a household in the township was $59,375, and the median income for a family was $61,458. Males had a median income of $41,500 versus $22,222 for females. The per capita income for the township was $20,983. About 1.0% of families and 1.9% of the population were below the poverty line, including 1.9% of those under age 18 and 2.9% of those age 65 or over.

== Sister city ==
- Nöbbele, Sweden
