= Almelund, Minnesota =

Unincorporated community in Minnesota, United States

Almelund
- Unincorporated community
- Nickname: The Busiest Small Town in Minnesota
- Location within Minnesota Location within the United States
- Coordinates: 45°29′29″N 92°47′08″W
- Country: United States
- State: Minnesota
- County: Chisago County
- Township: Amador Township
- Elevation: 997 ft (304 m)
- Time zone: UTC-6 (Central (CST))
  - Summer (DST): UTC-5 (CDT)
- ZIP code: 55012
- Area code: 651
- GNIS feature ID: 639300

Almelund is an unincorporated community in Amador Township, Chisago County, Minnesota, United States.

The community is located east of North Branch at the junction of State Highway 95 (MN 95) and Chisago County Road 12 (Park Trail). Nearby places include North Branch, Center City, Sunrise, and Taylors Falls.

ZIP codes 55012 (Center City), 55056 (North Branch), and 55084 (Taylors Falls) all intersect near Almelund.

Almelund is located 51 miles (82 km) north-northeast of Minneapolis.

The community's population is 2,945 people (as of 2018).

== History ==
The first European visitors to the area were French traders, who bought furs from the resident Ojibwa Indians in the 17th century. Yankee settlers moved to Amador Township in the 1850s living along the St. Croix River, which also had the first post office. Dr. Carmi P. Garlick platted the village as Amador (in Minnesota) in conjunction with the village of Sebetana (in Wisconsin) across the river from each other. He took the name Amador from Amador County, California where he had panned for gold. In 1857 he built a saw mill on the St. Croix River. Swedish immigrants arrived in the township in the 1870s to buy farm land.

The village of Almelund was founded in 1887 by Swedish Immigrant John Almquist who heard Swedish settlers were building a Lutheran church in this area. Almquist knew these settlers would need supplies, built a general store and operated it there for thirty years until it burned down in 1911.

The name Almelund is Swedish for elm grove.

The first wood-frame one-room school was built in 1890 and is today used as the Amador Town Hall. A two-room brick school was built in 1910 which is now the Amador Heritage Center, a museum which also includes three log cabins, a log barn and log granary.

Still in a prominent place at the center of town is Immanuel Lutheran Church. Originally known as the Swedish Evangelical Lutheran Emmanuel Church, the current building was built in 1926.

== Community ==
Almelund is bordered on the north and east by the St. Croix River and Wild River State Park. The township formerly was predominantly farmland with farm families raising corn, soybeans, dairy and beef cattle, and feed for those cattle. Many were descendants of the original Swedish immigrants. Today most of the township is no longer as farm-oriented—many local residents commute to the Twin Cities area for employment. The area is also known for its water sports and other outdoor recreation. Almelund is three miles south of Wild River State Park and west of Wild Mountain Recreation Area.

Almelund is also well known throughout east–central Minnesota for hosting the annual Threshing Show. It is a sixty-year-old celebration of vintage tractors, old farm equipment and traditional threshing methods.

Almelund's slogan is "The Busiest Small Town in Minnesota".
