= Rush Point, Minnesota =

Unincorporated community in Minnesota, United States

Rush Point
- Unincorporated community
- Location within Minnesota Location within the United States
- Coordinates: 45°39′31″N 93°06′15″W
- Country: United States
- State: Minnesota
- County: Chisago County
- Township: Nessel Township
- Elevation: 948 ft (289 m)
- Time zone: UTC-6 (Central (CST))
  - Summer (DST): UTC-5 (CDT)
- ZIP code: 55080
- Area codes: 763 and 320
- GNIS feature ID: 650414

Rush Point is an unincorporated community in Nessel Township, Chisago County, Minnesota, United States.

Chisago County Roads 4 and 7 are two of the main routes in the community. Nearby places include Rush City, Stanchfield, Braham, Grandy, Stark, Harris, and Cambridge.

ZIP codes 55080 (Stanchfield), 55069 (Rush City), and 55006 (Braham) all intersect near Rush Point.
