= Lent Township, Chisago County, Minnesota =

Township in Minnesota, United States

Lent Township
- Township
- Location within the state of Minnesota
- Coordinates: 45°24′46″N 92°58′0″W
- Country: United States
- State: Minnesota
- County: Chisago

Area
  - Total: 34.4 sq mi (89.1 km^{2})
  - Land: 32.4 sq mi (84.0 km^{2})
  - Water: 2.0 sq mi (5.1 km^{2})
- Elevation: 896 ft (273 m)

Population (2010)
  - Total: 3,091
  - Density: 95/sq mi (36.8/km^{2})
- Time zone: UTC-6 (Central (CST))
  - Summer (DST): UTC-5 (CDT)
- ZIP code: 55079
- Area code: 651
- FIPS code: 27-36440
- GNIS feature ID: 0664753
- Website: www.lenttownship.com

Lent Township is a former township in Chisago County, Minnesota, United States. The population was 3,091 as of the 2010 census, up from 1,992 in 2000.

== History ==
Lent Township was organized in 1872, and named in honor of Harvey Lent, a pioneer settler. In the mid 1850’s, the Lendt family emigrated from Germany and settled near Wyoming Township in Minnesota. Once in America, some of the family dropped the silent “d” from their name and were henceforth known as Lent.

Throughout 2023, large portions of the township were annexed to the neighboring cities of North Branch and Chisago City. On December 29, 2023, the remainder of the township was annexed to the city of Stacy, thus rendering the township government defunct.

== Geography ==
Lent Township was located in western Chisago County and was bordered by Isanti and Anoka counties to the west, the cities of Stacy, Wyoming, and Chisago City to the south, Chisago Lake Township to the east, and the city of North Branch to the north.

Interstate 35 crossed the western side of the township, leading north to North Branch and south to Stacy. County 17 exit provided access within the township, while County 19 exit in Stacy provided access to the southern part of the township.

According to the United States Census Bureau, the township had a total area of 34.4 square miles (89.1 km^{2}), of which 32.4 square miles (84.0 km^{2}) was land and 2.0 square miles (5.1 km^{2}), or 5.74%, was water.

== Demographics ==
Historical population
Census	Pop.	Note	%±
1880	175		—
1890	245		40.0%
1900	453		84.9%
1910	603		33.1%
1920	674		11.8%
1930	461		−31.6%
1940	436		−5.4%
1950	319		−26.8%
1960	355		11.3%
1970	556		56.6%
1980	1,380		148.2%
1990	1,797		30.2%
2000	1,992		10.9%
2010	3,091		55.2%
U.S. Decennial Census

As of the census of 2000, there were 1,992 people, 657 households, and 559 families residing in the township. The population density was 59.9 inhabitants per square mile (23.1/km^{2}). There were 667 housing units at an average density of 20.1 per square mile (7.8/km^{2}). The racial makeup of the township was 97.99% White, 0.10% African American, 0.20% Native American, 0.50% Asian, 0.05% Pacific Islander, 0.25% from other races, and 0.90% from two or more races. Hispanic or Latino of any race were 1.31% of the population.

There were 657 households, out of which 46.9% had children under the age of 18 living with them, 77.5% were married couples living together, 4.4% had a female householder with no husband present, and 14.8% were non-families. 10.7% of all households were made up of individuals, and 2.0% had someone living alone who was 65 years of age or older. The average household size was 3.03 and the average family size was 3.26.

In the township the population was spread out, with 30.5% under the age of 18, 6.9% from 18 to 24, 36.5% from 25 to 44, 21.7% from 45 to 64, and 4.4% who were 65 years of age or older. The median age was 34 years. For every 100 females, there were 108.6 males. For every 100 females age 18 and over, there were 109.2 males.

The median income for a household in the township was $61,163, and the median income for a family was $62,574. Males had a median income of $39,310 versus $31,098 for females. The per capita income for the township was $22,089. About 0.7% of families and 1.2% of the population were below the poverty line, including 1.6% of those under age 18 and none of those age 65 or over.
