= Rushseba Township, Chisago County, Minnesota =

Township in Minnesota, United States

Rushseba Township
- Township
- Location within the state of Minnesota
- Coordinates: 45°41′18″N 92°55′55″W
- Country: United States
- State: Minnesota
- County: Chisago

Area
  - Total: 30.4 sq mi (78.7 km^{2})
  - Land: 30.0 sq mi (77.6 km^{2})
  - Water: 0.42 sq mi (1.1 km^{2})
- Elevation: 902 ft (275 m)

Population (2010)
  - Total: 804
  - Density: 27/sq mi (10.4/km^{2})
- Time zone: UTC-6 (Central (CST))
  - Summer (DST): UTC-5 (CDT)
- ZIP code: 55069
- Area code: 320
- FIPS code: 27-56392
- GNIS feature ID: 0665491

Rushseba Township is a township in Chisago County, Minnesota, United States. The population was 804 at the 2010 census.

== History ==
Rushseba Township was organized in 1858. The county was named from the Rush River, and -seba, an Ojibwe language word meaning "river".

== Geography ==
Rushseba Township is located in the northeast corner of Chisago County, bordered to the east by the St. Croix River and the state of Wisconsin. To the north is the city of Rock Creek in Pine County, to the west is Nessel Township, and to the south are the city of Harris and Sunrise Township. The city of Rush City is in the western part of the township but is administratively separate.

Interstate 35 follows the western boundary line of the township, leading north to Rock Creek and Pine City, and south to Harris and North Branch. The closest access is from County 1 exit in Rush City.

According to the United States Census Bureau, Rushseba Township has a total area of 30.4 square miles (78.7 km^{2}), of which 30.0 square miles (77.6 km^{2}) is land and 0.42 square miles (1.1 km^{2}), or 1.34%, is water.

== Demographics ==
Historical population
Census	Pop.	Note	%±
1860	179		—
1870	706		294.4%
1880	394		−44.2%
1890	529		34.3%
1900	773		46.1%
1910	658		−14.9%
1920	792		20.4%
1930	738		−6.8%
1940	727		−1.5%
1950	632		−13.1%
1960	652		3.2%
1970	722		10.7%
1980	732		1.4%
1990	715		−2.3%
2000	769		7.6%
2010	804		4.6%
U.S. Decennial Census

As of the census of 2000, there were 769 people, 274 households, and 226 families residing in the township. The population density was 25.0 people per square mile (9.6/km^{2}). There were 313 housing units at an average density of 10.2/sq mi (3.9/km^{2}). The racial makeup of the township was 97.92% White, 0.52% Native American, 0.39% Asian, 0.26% from other races, and 0.91% from two or more races. Hispanic or Latino of any race were 0.78% of the population.

There were 274 households, out of which 36.1% had children under the age of 18 living with them, 71.9% were married couples living together, 5.5% had a female householder with no husband present, and 17.2% were non-families. 12.8% of all households were made up of individuals, and 6.2% had someone living alone who was 65 years of age or older. The average household size was 2.81 and the average family size was 3.07.

In the township the population was spread out, with 27.6% under the age of 18, 5.6% from 18 to 24, 29.8% from 25 to 44, 26.8% from 45 to 64, and 10.3% who were 65 years of age or older. The median age was 38 years. For every 100 females, there were 102.9 males. For every 100 females age 18 and over, there were 111.0 males.

The median income for a household in the township was $47,917, and the median family income was $50,938. Males had a median income of $38,542 versus $24,063 for females. The per capita income for the township was $19,727. About 3.4% of families and 5.6% of the population were below the poverty line, including 5.2% of those under age 18 and 13.6% of those over 64.
