= Thomas H. Horton =

American politician (1859–1943)

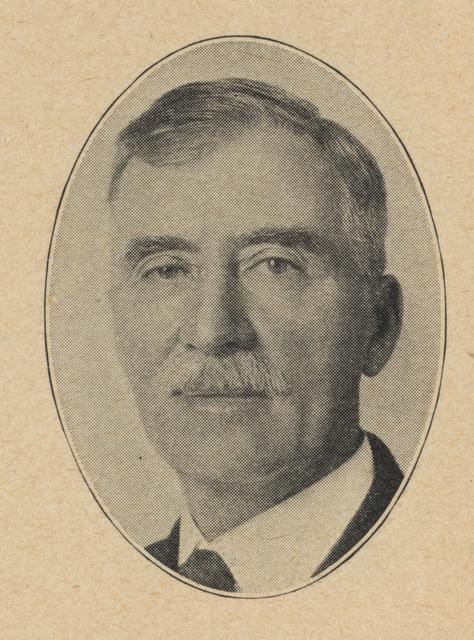

Member of the Minnesota House of Representatives from the 44th district
- In office January 2, 1923 – January 5, 1925

Member of the Minnesota House of Representatives from the 45th district
- In office January 8, 1907 – January 2, 1911

Personal details
- Born: October 11, 1859 Cleveland, Ohio, U.S.
- Died: October 17, 1943 (aged 84)
- Party: Republican
- Occupation: Politician, farmer

Thomas H. Horton (October 11, 1859 – October 17, 1943) was an American politician and farmer who served three terms in the Minnesota House of Representatives, representing the 45th legislative district of Minnesota from 1907 to 1911 and the 44th legislative district from 1923 to 1925.

== Early life and education ==
Horton was born in Cleveland, Ohio, on October 11, 1859. He came to Anoka County, Minnesota, in 1873 and later moved to Isanti County, Minnesota.

== Career ==
Horton served as a chair on the Isanti County Commission for six years.

Horton served a total of three terms in the Minnesota House of Representatives. He first represented the 45th legislative district of Minnesota from 1907 to 1911 in the 35th and 36th Minnesota Legislatures. Horton subsequently represented the 44th legislative district of Minnesota from 1923 to 1925 in the 43rd Minnesota Legislature.

During his time in office, Horton served on the following committees:

- Dairy and Live Stock (1907–1908)
- Hospitals for the Insane (1907–1908)
- Local Bills (1907–1908)
- Roads and Bridges (1907–1910)
- Taxes and Tax Laws (1907–1908)
- Towns and Counties (1907–1910)
- Agriculture (1909–1910)
- Binding Twine (1909–1910)
- Dairy Products and Live Stock (1909–1910)
- Horticulture (1909–1910)
- Hospital for Insane (1909–1910)
- Illuminating Oils (1909–1910)
- Game and Fish (1923–1924)
- Markets and Marketing (1923–1924)
- Public Domain (1923–1924)
- Public Highways (1923–1924)
- Railroads (1923–1924)
- Soldiers Home, State Bonus and Ex-Service Men (1923–1924)

Horton chaired the Roads and Bridges committee from 1909 to 1910.

Horton was a Republican. During his time in office, he represented the counties of Anoka, Isanti, Mille Lacs, and Sherburne.

Outside of the Minnesota Legislature, Horton was a farmer.

== Personal life and death ==
Horton was married. He resided in North Branch, Minnesota.

Horton died at the age of 84 on October 17, 1943.

Minnesota House of Representatives
Preceded by —	Member of the Minnesota House of Representatives from the 45th district 1907–1911	Succeeded by —
Minnesota House of Representatives
Preceded by —	Member of the Minnesota House of Representatives from the 44th district 1923–1925	Succeeded by —
