= Amador Township, Chisago County, Minnesota =

Township in Minnesota, United States

Amador Township
- Township
- Location within the state of Minnesota
- Coordinates: 45°30′25″N 92°45′54″W
- Country: United States
- State: Minnesota
- County: Chisago

Area
  - Total: 30.6 sq mi (79.2 km^{2})
  - Land: 29.9 sq mi (77.5 km^{2})
  - Water: 0.66 sq mi (1.7 km^{2})
- Elevation: 1,007 ft (307 m)

Population (2010)
  - Total: 885
  - Density: 30/sq mi (11.4/km^{2})
- Time zone: UTC-6 (Central (CST))
  - Summer (DST): UTC-5 (CDT)
- FIPS code: 27-01306
- GNIS feature ID: 0663425
- Website: www.amadortownship.com

Amador Township is a township in Chisago County, Minnesota, United States. The population was 885 at the 2010 census. The unincorporated community of Almelund is located within the township.

== History ==
Amador Township was organized in 1858. Amador is a name derived from Spanish meaning "lover".

== Geography ==
Amador Township is located in eastern Chisago County along the St. Croix River, which forms the Wisconsin–Minnesota border. State Highway 95 (MN 95) crosses the southwest part of the township, passing through Almelund and leading southeast to Taylors Falls and west to North Branch.

According to the United States Census Bureau, the township has a total area of 30.6 square miles (79.2 km^{2}), of which 29.9 square miles (77.5 km^{2}) is land and 0.66 square miles (1.7 km^{2}), or 2.17%, is water.

== Demographics ==
Historical population
Census	Pop.	Note	%±
1860	61		—
1870	77		26.2%
1880	178		131.2%
1890	453		154.5%
1900	595		31.3%
1910	656		10.3%
1920	752		14.6%
1930	754		0.3%
1940	699		−7.3%
1950	618		−11.6%
1960	541		−12.5%
1970	562		3.9%
1980	593		5.5%
1990	632		6.6%
2000	744		17.7%
2010	885		19.0%
U.S. Decennial Census

As of the census of 2000, there were 744 people, 264 households, and 199 families residing in the township. The population density was 24.9 inhabitants per square mile (9.6/km^{2}). There were 282 housing units at an average density of 9.4 per square mile (3.6/km^{2}). The racial makeup of the township was 98.79% White, 0.27% African American, 0.27% Asian, 0.40% from other races, and 0.27% from two or more races. Hispanic or Latino of any race were 0.94% of the population.

There were 264 households, out of which 34.5% had children under the age of 18 living with them, 67.0% were married couples living together, 3.0% had a female householder with no husband present, and 24.6% were non-families. 15.2% of all households were made up of individuals, and 5.3% had someone living alone who was 65 years of age or older. The average household size was 2.82 and the average family size was 3.18.

In the township the population was spread out, with 29.0% under the age of 18, 6.3% from 18 to 24, 30.4% from 25 to 44, 24.6% from 45 to 64, and 9.7% who were 65 years of age or older. The median age was 38 years. For every 100 females, there were 117.5 males. For every 100 females age 18 and over, there were 114.6 males.

The median income for a household in the township was $55,000, and the median income for a family was $57,143. Males had a median income of $40,000 versus $27,344 for females. The per capita income for the township was $22,759. About 1.0% of families and 2.5% of the population were below the poverty line, including 1.0% of those under age 18 and 3.5% of those age 65 or over.
