= Nessel Township, Chisago County, Minnesota =

Township in Minnesota, United States

Nessel Township
- Township
- Location within the state of Minnesota
- Coordinates: 45°41′11″N 93°4′16″W
- Country: United States
- State: Minnesota
- County: Chisago

Area
  - Total: 42.7 sq mi (110.6 km^{2})
  - Land: 37.4 sq mi (96.8 km^{2})
  - Water: 5.3 sq mi (13.8 km^{2})
- Elevation: 920 ft (280 m)

Population (2010)
  - Total: 1,951
  - Density: 52/sq mi (20.1/km^{2})
- Time zone: UTC-6 (Central (CST))
  - Summer (DST): UTC-5 (CDT)
- FIPS code: 27-45250
- GNIS feature ID: 0665081
- Website: nesseltownship.com

Nessel Township is a township in Chisago County, Minnesota, United States. The population was 1,951 at the 2010 census.

== Geography ==
Nessel Township is located in the northwest corner of Chisago County and is bordered by Isanti County to the west and Pine County to the north. Rush City lies on the eastern border of the township. The unincorporated community of Rush Point is in the southwest part of the township.

Interstate 35 closely follows the eastern boundary line of the township, leading north to Rock Creek and Pine City, and south to Harris and North Branch. Access to the township is from County 1 exit in Rush City.

According to the United States Census Bureau, the township has a total area of 42.7 square miles (110.6 km^{2}), of which 37.4 square miles (96.8 km^{2}) is land and 5.3 square miles (13.8 km^{2}), or 12.45%, is water. Rush Lake is a large two-basin water body in the center of the township.

== History ==
Nessel Township bears the name of its earliest pioneer farmer, Robert Nessel, who was born in Germany in 1834, came to the United States in 1847 and to Minnesota in 1854, and settled here in 1856. The township was organized in 1870.

Rush Lake, and the soil, attracted people to settle in the township, and many of the farms are still owned by the descendants of the early settlers. When Mr. Nessel filed for a homestead of his place, he found that many Native Americans occupied the land, with whom he had to bargain. He reportedly paid $150.00 for the initial 160 acres (0.65 km^{2}) to Alexis LaPrairie. This was a great camping place for the native people, as the lower lake was full of wild rice which they gathered. The narrows between the two lakes was a gathering place for the native people during rice harvesting time.

== Demographics ==
Historical population
Census	Pop.	Note	%±
1880	867		—
1890	1,065		22.8%
1900	1,288		20.9%
1910	1,131		−12.2%
1920	1,103		−2.5%
1930	914		−17.1%
1940	885		−3.2%
1950	776		−12.3%
1960	764		−1.5%
1970	1,102		44.2%
1980	1,460		32.5%
1990	1,354		−7.3%
2000	1,765		30.4%
2010	1,951		10.5%
U.S. Decennial Census

As of the census of 2000, there were 1,765 people, 668 households, and 509 families residing in the township. The population density was 46.3 inhabitants per square mile (17.9/km^{2}). There were 921 housing units at an average density of 24.2/sq mi (9.3/km^{2}). The racial makeup of the township was 98.75% White, 0.06% African American, 0.11% Native American, 0.17% Asian, 0.28% from other races, and 0.62% from two or more races. Hispanic or Latino of any race were 0.68% of the population.

There were 668 households, out of which 31.1% had children under the age of 18 living with them, 69.2% were married couples living together, 3.6% had a female householder with no husband present, and 23.8% were non-families. 17.8% of all households were made up of individuals, and 7.6% had someone living alone who was 65 years of age or older. The average household size was 2.61 and the average family size was 2.97.

In the township the population was spread out, with 25.4% under the age of 18, 3.9% from 18 to 24, 27.8% from 25 to 44, 28.3% from 45 to 64, and 14.6% who were 65 years of age or older. The median age was 41 years. For every 100 females, there were 109.1 males. For every 100 females age 18 and over, there were 106.9 males.

The median income for a household in the township was $47,578, and the median income for a family was $52,443. Males had a median income of $39,712 versus $27,100 for females. The per capita income for the township was $20,953. About 1.8% of families and 5.3% of the population were below the poverty line, including 3.7% of those under age 18 and 9.5% of those age 65 or over.
