= Taylors Falls Public Library =

- U.S. National Register of Historic Places
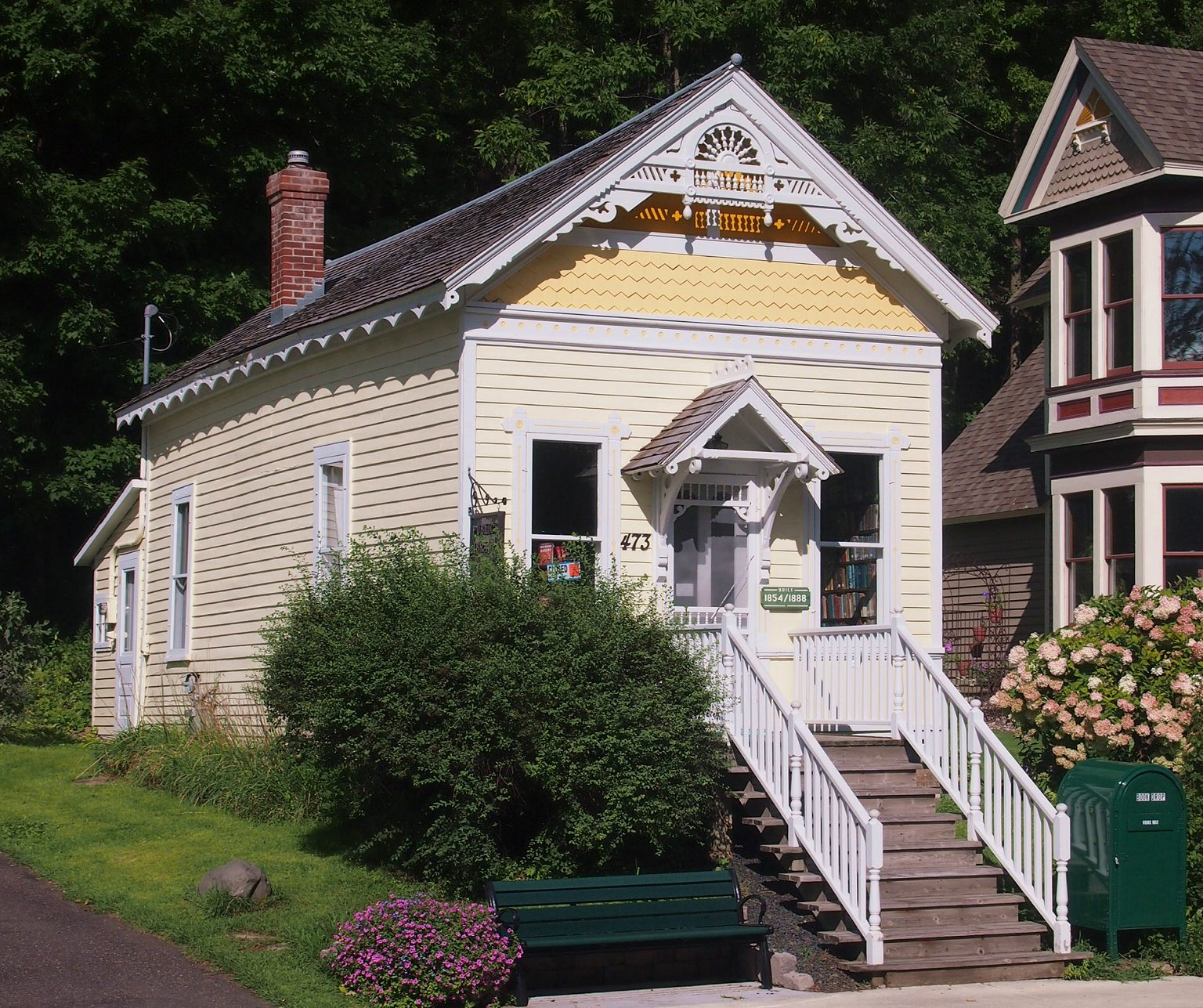
- Taylors Falls Public Library from the south-southeast

- Location within Minnesota Location within the United States
- Location: 473 Bench Street, Taylors Falls, Minnesota
- Coordinates: 45°24′14.3″N 92°39′10.4″W
- Area: .25 acres (0.10 ha)
- Built: 1854, remodeled 1887
- Built by: John Jacob Spengler, remodeled by Thomas Peck
- Architectural style: Carpenter Gothic/Stick style
- NRHP reference No.: 70000290
- Added to NRHP: October 15, 1970

Taylors Falls Public Library is the public library of Taylors Falls, Minnesota, United States, still operating in its original 19th-century building. Originally constructed as a tailor shop in 1854, the building was remodeled and converted into a library in 1887. Taylors Falls Public Library was listed on the National Register of Historic Places in 1970 for its local significance in the themes of architecture and education. It was nominated for being an intact example of small-town libraries as they existed before Carnegie libraries and bookmobiles and for its Carpenter Gothic/Stick style architecture.

== Description ==
Taylors Falls Public Library is a one-story, two-room building measuring 32 feet (9.8 m) long and 14 feet (4.3 m) wide. It is of wood frame construction with clapboard siding on a sandstone foundation. The front door is capped by a Gothic Revival canopy and flanked by Stick-style windows with Eastlake movement decorations. Elaborately sawn and turned ornaments adorn the bargeboards and front façade. A 14-by-7-foot (4.3 by 2.1 m) lean to abuts the rear.

Inside the front room features a plastered barrel vault ceiling, while the back room has a pressed tin ceiling.

== History ==
The building was originally constructed as a simple tailor shop in 1854 by John Jacob Spengler, who operated his business in the front and lived in the back room with his family. Spengler sewed uniforms for Union soldiers during the American Civil War. In 1887 the building was sold to the Taylors Falls Library Association for use as a library. Thomas Peck converted the building to its new use and added ornamentation typical of the late 19th century. The rear lean-to was added sometime later.

The library continues to operate in the building, with a collection of 10,000 items.

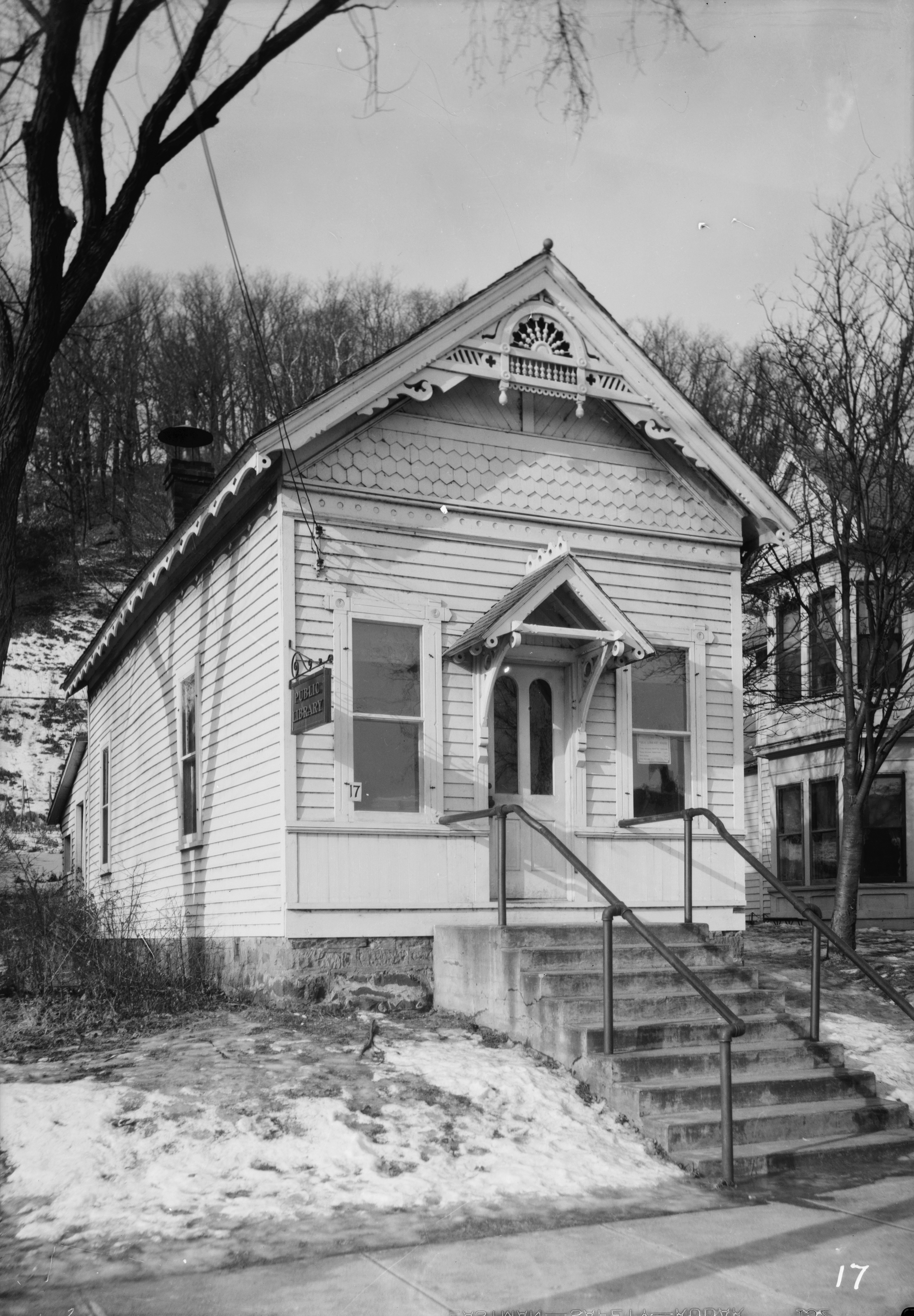
Taylors Falls Public Library in 1934

== See also ==
- National Register of Historic Places listings in Chisago County, Minnesota
