= Moody Barn =

- U.S. National Register of Historic Places
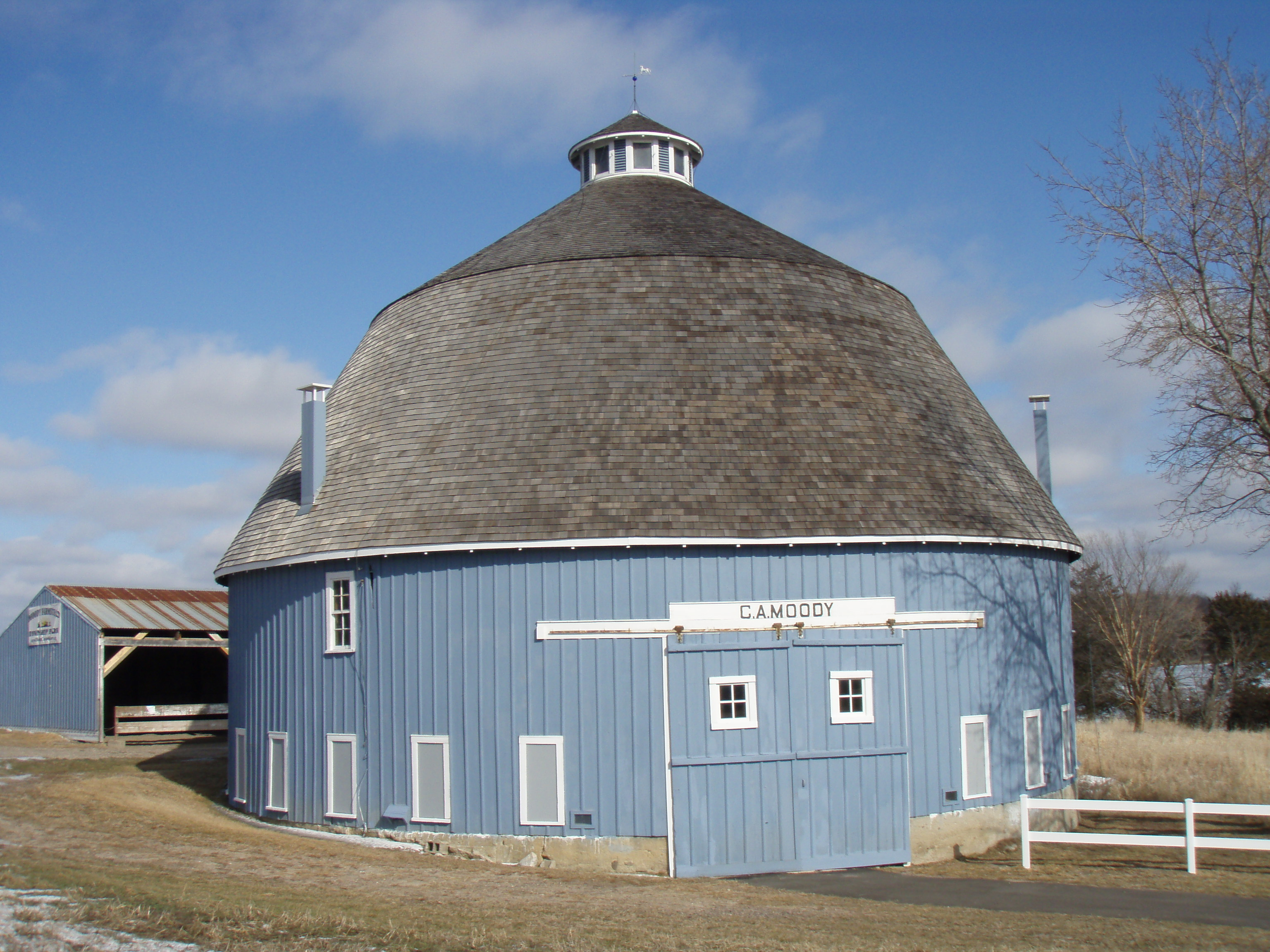

- Location within Minnesota Location within the United States
- Nearest city: Chisago City, Minnesota
- Coordinates: 45°18′7″N 92°52′14″W
- Area: less than one acre
- Built: 1915
- MPS: Chisago County MRA
- NRHP reference No.: 80001998
- Added to NRHP: July 21, 1980

The Moody Barn is a round barn in Chisago Lake Township, Chisago County, Minnesota, United States. The farm was first homesteaded in 1871 by Elof and Eva Modig, who emigrated from Sweden. The couple raised five children and grew wheat on their farm, as was common in the 1870s. By the 1890s Minnesota farming had begun to diversify, with cheese and butter production becoming popular and distributed by cooperative creameries. In 1915 Charles Moody, one of the sons, decided to build a modern round barn.

The barn is 56 feet (17 m) in diameter and about the same in height. The interior contains a 42-foot high (13 m) silo. The first floor of the barn housed milk cows and their calves, while the second floor was used to store hay. Instead of the traditional red and white paint, the Moody barn was painted in a blue-gray color. The construction cost was $3200, with seven men paid $1 per day plus meals for the construction.

The accompanying farm house was moved from the west side of the road to the east side in 2004. The barn and farm house are now owned by the Chisago Lakes Township and managed by the Chisago County Historical Society. The barn has been repainted and reshingled, and is situated in the 25-acre (10 ha) Moody Lake Park. The barn is the last remaining round barn in Chisago County.
