= Center City Historic District =

Historic district in Minnesota, United States

- U.S. National Register of Historic Places
- U.S. Historic district
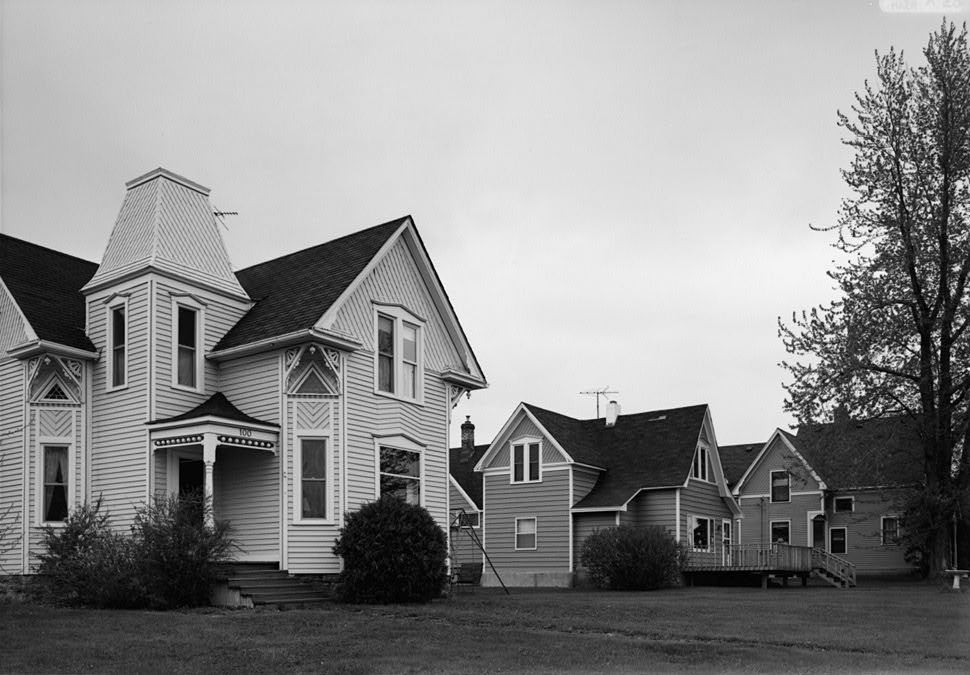

- Location within Minnesota Location within the United States
- Location: Summit Ave., Center City, Minnesota
- Coordinates: 45°23′39″N 92°49′0″W
- Area: 9.4 acres (3.8 ha)
- Built: 1888
- Architect: Carlson, William
- Architectural style: Queen Anne, Romanesque
- MPS: Chisago County MRA
- NRHP reference No.: 80001996
- Added to NRHP: July 21, 1980

Center City Historic District is a grouping of 19 homes and one church located along the east side of Summit Avenue situated on a hill overlooking North Center Lake in Center City, Minnesota, United States. It was listed as a historic district on the National Register of Historic Places in 1980. Center City became the county seat of Chisago County in the 1870s, during a time of Swedish migration and settlement in the county. The buildings in the historic district include the Chisago Lake Evangelical Lutheran Church, which was the main Swedish Lutheran parish in the area, as well as a number of residences built between 1888 and 1910. The homes have moderate ornamentation and attention to architectural styling details of their period.

The Center City Historic District is significant as a link to the Swedish Lutheran population of the Chisago Lakes region during the area's most important period of development and as the county's finest concentration of late nineteenth and early twentieth century residences. When the railroad arrived in the Chisago Lakes region in 1881, the area witnessed significant growth. The residences within the Center City Historic District, housed merchants, tradesmen, professionals, politicians, and retired farmers. They are reflective of the growing prosperity of the region.

The Chisago Lake Evangelical Lutheran Church is the second-oldest Lutheran congregation in Minnesota. It was founded in 1854 by Eric Norelius, who founded several other Lutheran churches in Minnesota. Norelius was a divinity student and served for three months before returning to the seminary. A permanent pastor arrived in 1855, and a wood-frame church was built in 1856. A brick church was built in 1881–1883, but it was struck by lightning and burned in 1888. The congregation rebuilt the church immediately, using the masonry contractors as before. The bell was installed in the steeple in 1890, and a clock was installed in 1907.

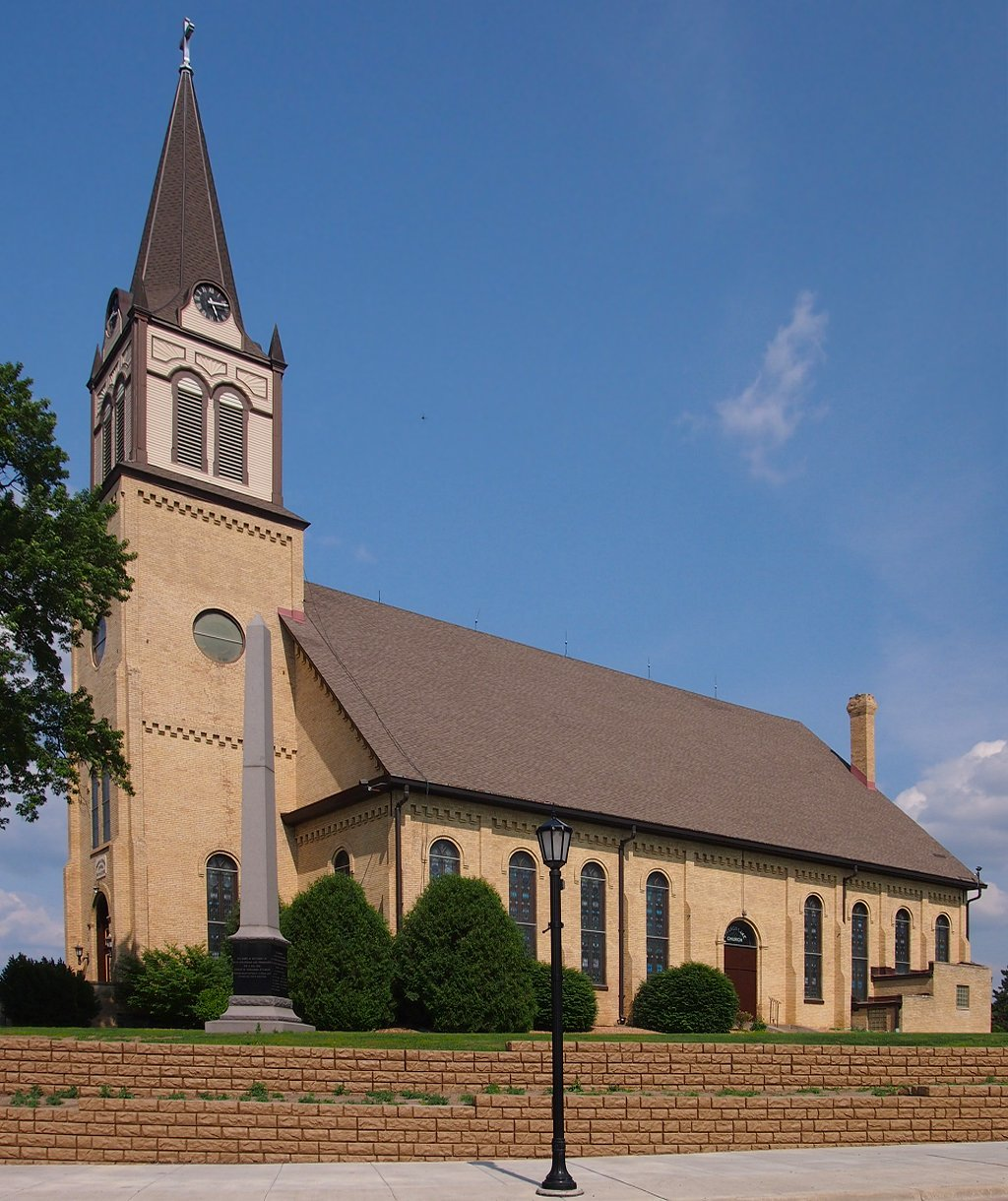
The Chisago Lake Evangelical Lutheran Church
