= Hassela =

- Location within Sweden Gävleborg Location within Sweden
- Coordinates: 62°08′N 16°43′E
- Country: Sweden
- Province: Hälsingland
- County: Gävleborg County
- Municipality: Nordanstig Municipality

Area
  - Total: 1.01 km^{2} (0.39 sq mi)

Population (31 December 2010)
  - Total: 364
  - Density: 360/km^{2} (930/sq mi)
- Time zone: UTC+1 (CET)
  - Summer (DST): UTC+2 (CEST)
- Climate: Dfc

Hassela (Swedish pronunciation: [ˈhâsːɛla]) is a locality situated in Nordanstig Municipality, Gävleborg County, Sweden with 364 inhabitants in 2010.

== Sister cities ==
- (United States) Center City - Minnesota, USA
