= Minnesota State Highway 95 =

Highway in Minnesota

Trunk Highway 95
- MN 95 highlighted in red

Route information
- Maintained by MnDOT
- Length: 126.892 mi (204.213 km)
- Existed: 1933–present

Major junctions
- Northwest end: MN 23 at Sauk Rapids
- US 169 at Princeton MN 65 at Cambridge; I-35 at North Branch; US 8 at Taylors Falls; MN 36 at Oak Park Heights I-94 / US 12 at Woodbury
- Southeast end: US 10 / US 61 at Cottage Grove

Location
- Country: United States
- State: Minnesota
- Counties: Benton, Mille Lacs, Isanti, Chisago, Washington

Highway system
- Minnesota Trunk Highway System; Interstate; US; State; Legislative; Scenic
← I-94	→ MN 96

Minnesota State Highway 95 (MN 95) is a 126.892-mile-long (204.213 km) highway in east-central Minnesota, which runs from its intersection with State Highway 23 near St. Cloud and continues east and south to its southern terminus at its intersection with U.S. Highways 61 / 10 (co-signed) at Cottage Grove.

This highway has two distinct segments (East–west section and a north–south section) that meet at Taylors Falls.

MN 95 passes through the cities of Princeton, Cambridge, North Branch, Taylors Falls, Stillwater, and Lakeland.

== Route description ==
State Highway 95 has a somewhat unusual routing, starting with a west-to-east section between St. Cloud and Taylors Falls, then finishing with a north–south section between Taylors Falls and Cottage Grove. In fact, the Minnesota Legislature originally authorized the east–west and the north–south routes as two separate highways. The Minnesota Highway Department decided to give them both the same route number.

This highway runs through mostly rural areas immediately north and east of the Twin Cities, although increasing development in the eastern suburbs of Saint Paul may bring increased traffic to the highway. Primarily a two-lane highway, Highway 95 has a short concurrency with Interstate 94/US Highway 12 between Woodbury and Lakeland, that makes up the only divided highway sections of Highway 95.

The 14-mile (23 km) section of Highway 95 from Cambridge to North Branch is officially designated the State Trooper Timothy J. Bowe Memorial Highway.

=== State Parks ===
Highway 95, on its north–south section, parallels the St. Croix River and is adjacent to, or close to, several state parks:

- Wild River State Park
- Interstate Park
- William O'Brien State Park
- Afton State Park

== History ==
Both sections of State Highway 95 were authorized in 1933.

By 1940, Highway 95 was paved between Princeton and North Branch; and between Scandia and Afton.

The route was completely paved by 1953.

In 1998, a change was made in the alignment on the south end of Highway 95, between Washington County Road 18 and I-94. Previously, Highway 95 turned east on 40th Street South in Afton and then turned north on the St. Croix Trail; present day Highway 95 now continues north along Manning Avenue (the Afton / Woodbury border) and then runs together with I-94 briefly east to Lakeland. The old route of Highway 95 for this section is now signed as County Road 18.

In an effort to maximize driver safety, a roundabout was constructed at the intersection of Highway 95 and County Road 29 in Princeton. The project was completed in November 2010 at a cost of $6.7 million.

A five-mile section of Highway 95 near Bayport in Washington County was honored with a 2013 Perpetual Pavement Award in recognition of its long life without any structural failure and only periodic resurfacing.

Prior to August 2, 2017, MN 95 ran concurrent with MN 36 from Oak Park Heights to Chestnut Street in downtown Stillwater, where MN 36 then turned east to cross the Stillwater Lift Bridge. Upon the opening of the St. Croix Crossing bridge, this concurrency was eliminated and Highways 95 and 36 now have a full interchange with each other.

== Major intersections ==
County	Location	mi	km	Destinations	Notes
Benton	Minden Township	0.050	0.080	MN 23 / CSAH 8 – Foley, St. Cloud	
Benton	St. George Township	6.993	11.254	MN 25 – Foley, Becker	
Mille Lacs	Princeton	22.250– 22.389	35.808– 36.032	US 169 – Milaca, Elk River	Interchange
Mille Lacs	Princeton	23.920	38.496	CSAH 29 (Rum River Drive)	Roundabout; formerly US 169
Isanti	Pine Brook	33.431	53.802	MN 47 – Dalbo, Anoka	Roundabout
Isanti	Cambridge	42.319– 42.426	68.106– 68.278	MN 65 – Mora, Minneapolis	Interchange
Chisago	North Branch	54.370– 54.503	87.500– 87.714	I-35 – Duluth, St. Paul, Minneapolis	I-35 exit 147; interchange.
Chisago	North Branch	55.060	88.610	CSAH 30 / Old US 61	
Chisago	Taylors Falls	74.503	119.901	CSAH 16 / St. Croix Scenic Byway north – Wild Mountain Recreation Area	North end of St. Croix Scenic Byway overlap
Chisago	Taylors Falls	74.922	120.575	US 8 east – St. Croix Falls	East end of US 8 overlap
Chisago	Franconia Township	78.174	125.809	US 8 west – Center City, Forest Lake	West end of US 8 overlap
Chisago	Franconia Township	82.920	133.447	MN 243 east – Osceola	
Washington	Scandia	88.563	142.528	MN 97 west (Scandia Trail) – Forest Lake	
Washington	Stillwater	102.353	164.721	MN 96 west (Dellwood Road) – White Bear Lake	
Washington	Stillwater	103.507	166.578	Myrtle Street	Formerly MN 212 west
Washington	Stillwater	103.565	166.672	CSAH 23 (Chestnut Street)	Formerly MN 36 east; previously MN 212 east
Washington	Oak Park Heights	105.389	169.607	MN 36 – Somerset, Minneapolis	Interchange
Washington	Lakeland	111.023	178.674	I-94 east / US 12 east / CSAH 18 south / St. Croix Scenic Byway south – Eau Claire	East end of I-94/US 12 overlap, exit 258.
Washington	Woodbury	115.623	186.077	I-94 west / US 12 west / CSAH 15 north – St. Paul	West end of I-94/US 12 overlap, exit 253.
Washington	Cottage Grove	127.295	204.861	US 10 / US 61 / I-94 Alt. – Hastings, St. Paul	
1.000 mi = 1.609 km; 1.000 km = 0.621 mi: Concurrency terminus
