= Center City, Minnesota =

City in Minnesota, United States

Center City
- City
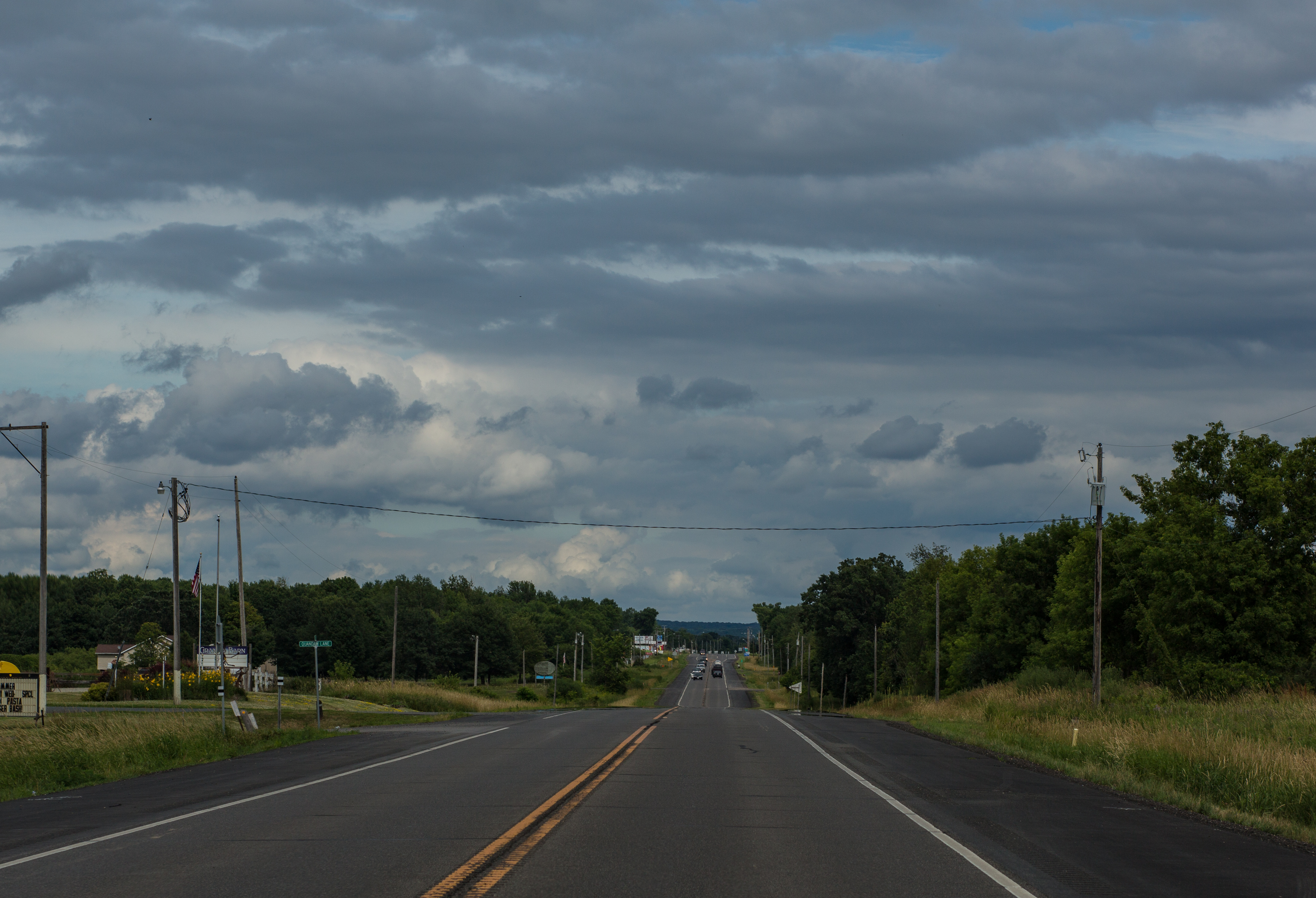
- US Route 8 passing through Center City

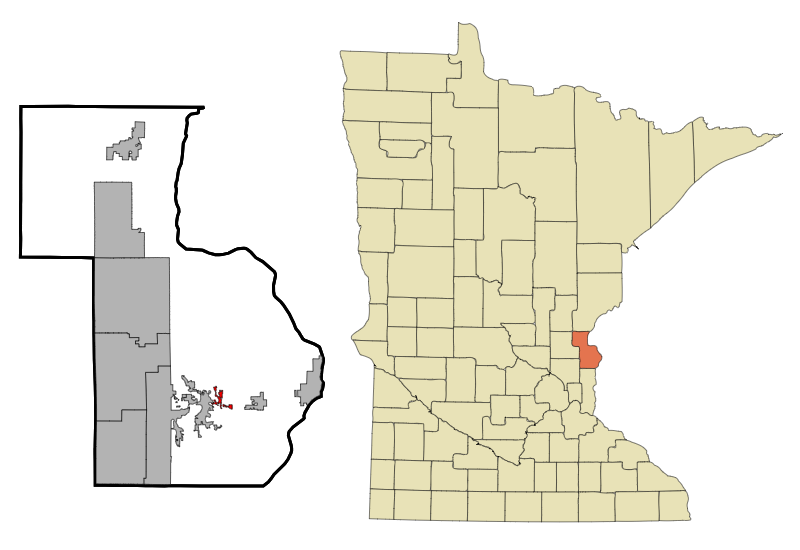
- Location of Center City within Chisago County, Minnesota
- Coordinates: 45°23′42″N 92°49′2″W
- Country: United States
- State: Minnesota
- County: Chisago

Area
  - Total: 0.59 sq mi (1.54 km^{2})
  - Land: 0.58 sq mi (1.51 km^{2})
  - Water: 0.012 sq mi (0.03 km^{2})
- Elevation: 932 ft (284 m)

Population (2020)
  - Total: 629
  - Density: 1,075.5/sq mi (415.27/km^{2})
- Time zone: UTC-6 (Central (CST))
  - Summer (DST): UTC-5 (CDT)
- ZIP codes: 55002, 55012
- Area code: 651
- FIPS code: 27-10576
- GNIS feature ID: 663772
- Website: centercitymn.us

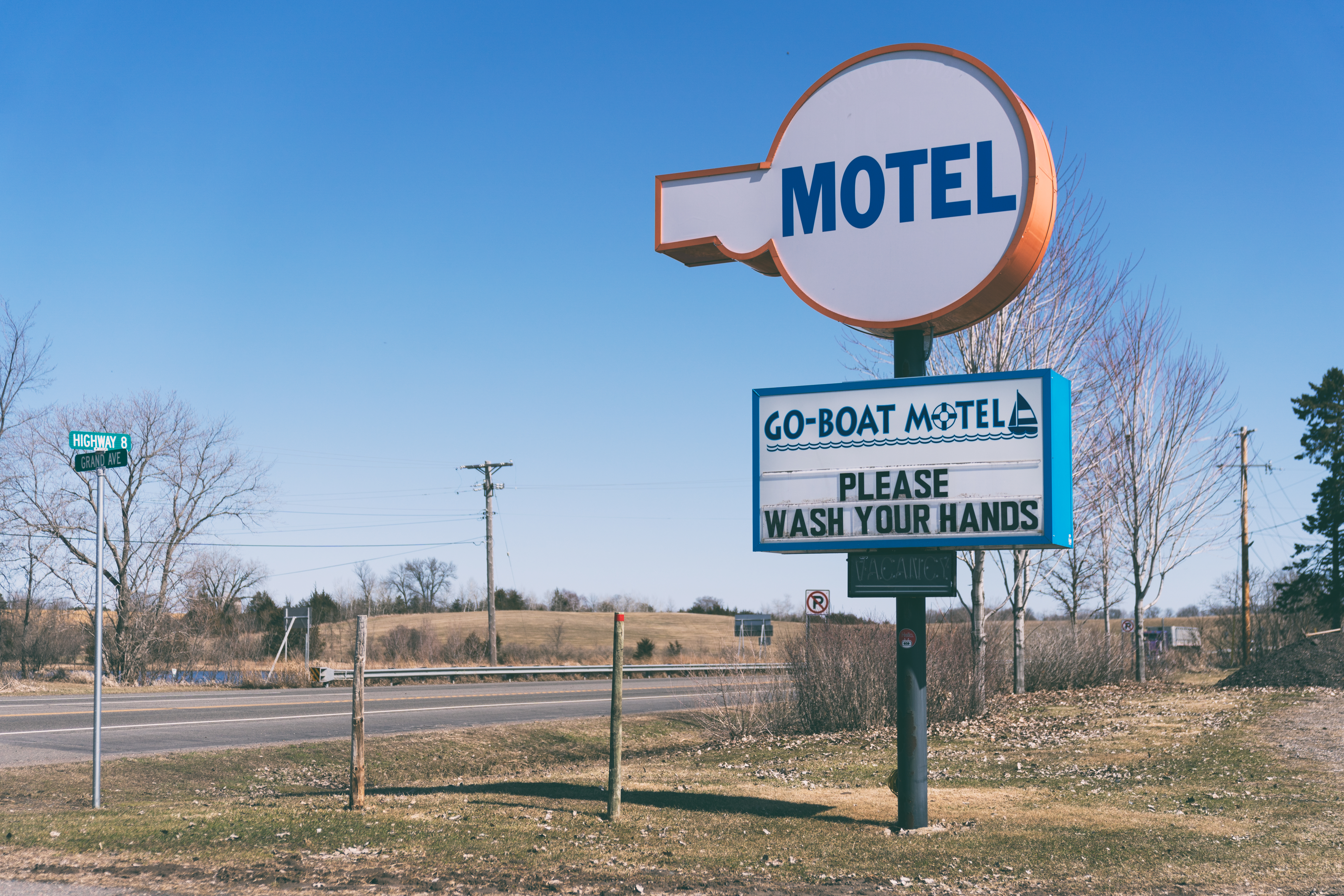
"Wash Your Hands" message at the Go Boat Motel in Center City, Minnesota during the 2020 coronavirus pandemic

Center City is a city and the county seat of Chisago County, Minnesota, United States. As of the 2020 census, Center City had a population of 629.

U.S. Highway 8 serves as a main route.

== History ==
Center City was platted in 1857, and named from its location roughly halfway between Chisago City and Taylors Falls. A post office was established as Centre City in 1858, and the name was changed to Center City in 1893.

== Geography ==
According to the United States Census Bureau, the city has an area of 0.61 square miles (1.58 km^{2}), of which 0.59 square miles (1.53 km^{2}) is land and 0.02 square miles (0.05 km^{2}) is water.

Nearby places include Lindström, Shafer, Taylors Falls, St. Croix Falls, Chisago City, Stacy, Wyoming, North Branch, and Forest Lake.

== Demographics ==
Historical population
Census	Pop.	Note	%±
1880	33		—
1910	252		—
1920	285		13.1%
1930	285		0.0%
1940	251		−11.9%
1950	311		23.9%
1960	293		−5.8%
1970	324		10.6%
1980	458		41.4%
1990	451		−1.5%
2000	582		29.0%
2010	628		7.9%
2020	629		0.2%
U.S. Decennial Census

=== 2020 census ===
As of the census of 2020, there were 629 people and 254 households. 97.6% of residents had at least a high school education, and 25.8% had attained a bachelor's degree or higher. 13.7% were veterans.

99.5% of residents were born in the United States, and 74.0% had been born in Minnesota. 1 person was foreign-born. 99.6% of residents spoke only English at home.

The racial makeup of the city was 94.0% White alone (97.1% White alone or in combination), 0.7% Asian, 0.2% Black, 1.1% Native American, and 1.0% some other race. 3.2% were two or more races. Hispanic and Latinos of any race made were 3.2%. The most common ancestries in Center City were German (25.8%), Swedish (19.1%), Norwegian (13.9%), Irish (9.0%), and Polish (4.7%).

The median age was 49.1 years. 16% were under the age of 18. The median household income was $77,679.

=== 2010 census ===
As of the census of 2010, there were 628 people, 247 households, and 175 families living in the city. The population density was 1,064.4 inhabitants per square mile (411.0/km^{2}). There were 291 housing units at an average density of 493.2 units per square mile (190.4 units/km^{2}). The racial makeup of the city was 97.8% White, 0.5% African American, 0.6% Native American, 0.3% Asian, 0.2% from other races, and 0.6% from two or more races. Hispanic or Latino of any race were 1.1% of the population.

There were 247 households, of which 27.9% had children under the age of 18 living with them, 59.1% were married couples living together, 8.9% had a female householder with no husband present, 2.8% had a male householder with no wife present, and 29.1% were non-families. 26.3% of all households were made up of individuals, and 10.5% had someone living alone who was 65 years of age or older. The average household size was 2.38 and the average family size was 2.81.

The median age in the city was 44.7 years. 19.6% of residents were under the age of 18; 8.1% were between the ages of 18 and 24; 23.1% were from 25 to 44; 31.4% were from 45 to 64; and 17.8% were 65 years of age or older. The gender makeup of the city was 50.3% male and 49.7% female.

=== 2000 census ===
As of the census of 2000, there were 582 people, 194 households, and 148 families living in the city. The population density was 1,240.8 inhabitants per square mile (479.1/km^{2}). There were 214 housing units at an average density of 456.3 units per square mile (176.2 units/km^{2}). The racial makeup of the city was 96.91% White, 0.69% African American, 2.06% Native American, 0.17% Asian, and 0.17% from two or more races. Hispanic or Latino of any race were 0.69% of the population.

There were 194 households, out of which 33.5% had children under the age of 18 living with them, 66.5% were married couples living together, 7.7% had a female householder with no husband present, and 23.7% were non-families. 18.0% of all households were made up of individuals, and 5.2% had someone living alone who was 65 years of age or older. The average household size was 2.65 and the average family size was 3.00.

In the city, the population was spread out, with 24.6% under the age of 18, 7.4% from 18 to 24, 30.6% from 25 to 44, 25.6% from 45 to 64, and 11.9% who were 65 years of age or older. The median age was 39 years. For every 100 females, there were 112.4 males. For every 100 females age 18 and over, there were 120.6 males.

The median income for a household in the city was $48,594, and the median income for a family was $51,875. Males had a median income of $39,205 versus $30,156 for females. The per capita income for the city was $17,774. About 0.7% of families and 5.5% of the population were below the poverty line, including 1.3% of those under age 18 and 2.2% of those age 65 or over.

== In popular culture ==
Center City was the setting of Swedish author Vilhelm Moberg's epic novels The Emigrants, written and published in four volumes between 1949 and 1959, and made into two feature films in 1972 and 1974.

In the movie Grumpy Old Men, the church in the wedding scene is at Chisago Lake Lutheran Church in Center City.

== Sister cities ==
- Hassela, Sweden

== See also ==
- Chisago Lakes School District
- Center City Historic District
