= Lindstrom, Minnesota =

City in Minnesota, United States

Lindström, Minnesota
- City
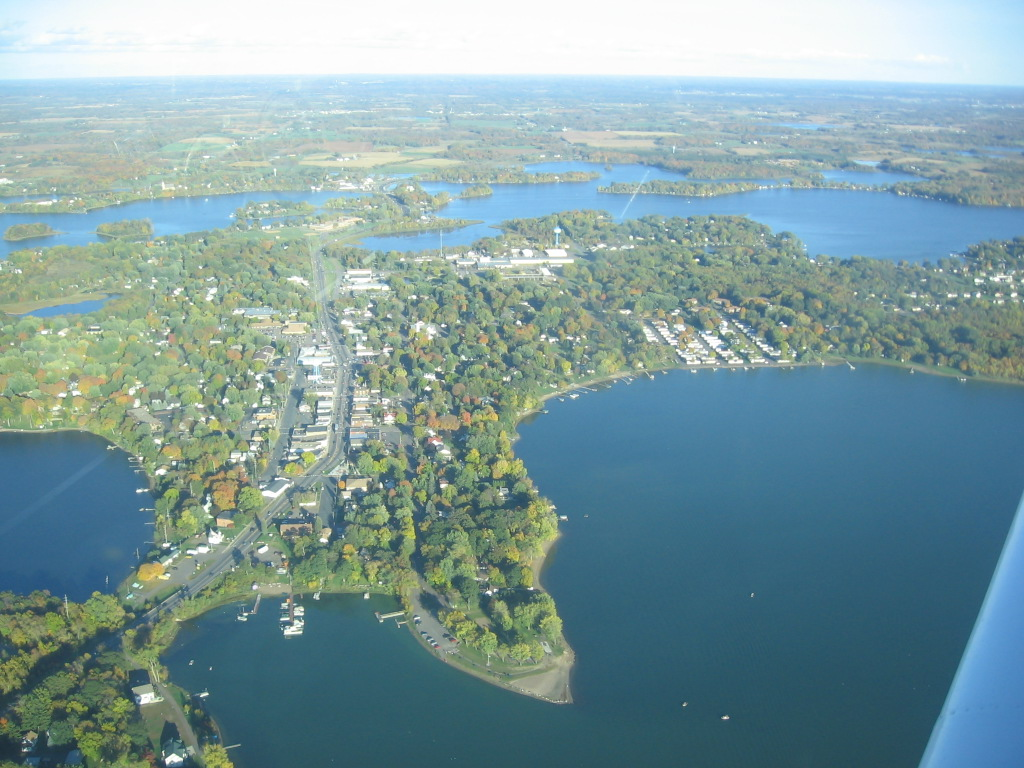
- September 2006 aerial view of the town of Lindström
- Motto: America's Little Sweden
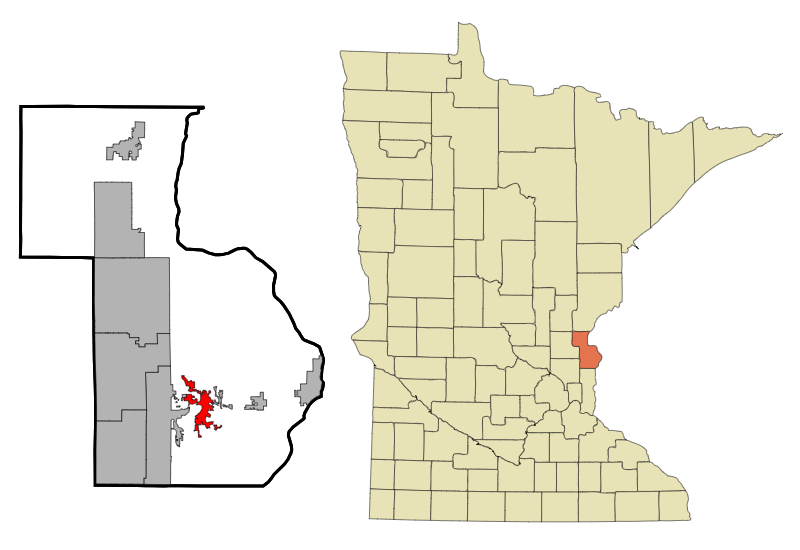
- Location of Lindström in Chisago County, Minnesota
- Coordinates: 45°23′24″N 92°50′43″W
- Country: United States
- State: Minnesota
- County: Chisago
- Platted: 1880
- Incorporated (village): August 28, 1894
- Incorporated (city): April 9, 1908

Government
  - Type: Mayor–council government
  - Mayor: Judy Chartrand (I)
  - Councilmembers: Linda Merkel; Brian Norelius; Judy Chartrand; David Waldoch; Greg Krueger

Area
  - Total: 3.885 sq mi (10.062 km^{2})
  - Land: 3.818 sq mi (9.888 km^{2})
  - Water: 0.067 sq mi (0.174 km^{2})
- Elevation: 909 ft (277 m)

Population (2020)
  - Total: 4,888
  - Estimate (2023): 5,008
  - Density: 1,312/sq mi (506.5/km^{2})
- Time zone: UTC−6 (Central (CST))
  - Summer (DST): UTC−5 (CDT)
- ZIP Code: 55045
- Area code: 651
- FIPS code: 27-37304
- GNIS feature ID: 2395717
- Sales tax: 7.375%
- Website: cityoflindstrom.us

Lindström (also spelled Lindstrom) is a city in Chisago County, Minnesota, United States, located 35 miles northeast of the Twin Cities. The population was 4,888 at the 2020 census. Lindström's motto is America's Little Sweden. U.S. Highway 8 serves as a main route for the community.

== Geography ==
According to the United States Census Bureau, the city has a total area of 3.885 square miles (10.06 km^{2}), of which 3.818 square miles (9.89 km^{2}) is land and 0.067 square miles (0.17 km^{2}) is water.

Lindström is located 10 miles (16 km) from the Wisconsin state line, and less than two hours from cities including Duluth, St. Cloud, and the Twin Cities area. The landmass of Lindstrom consists mainly of lakes (including South Lindstrom Lake, North Lindstrom Lake, South Center Lake, North Center Lake and Kroon Lake). With so many lakes, Lindstrom is a destination for fishers from all over the world.

== History ==
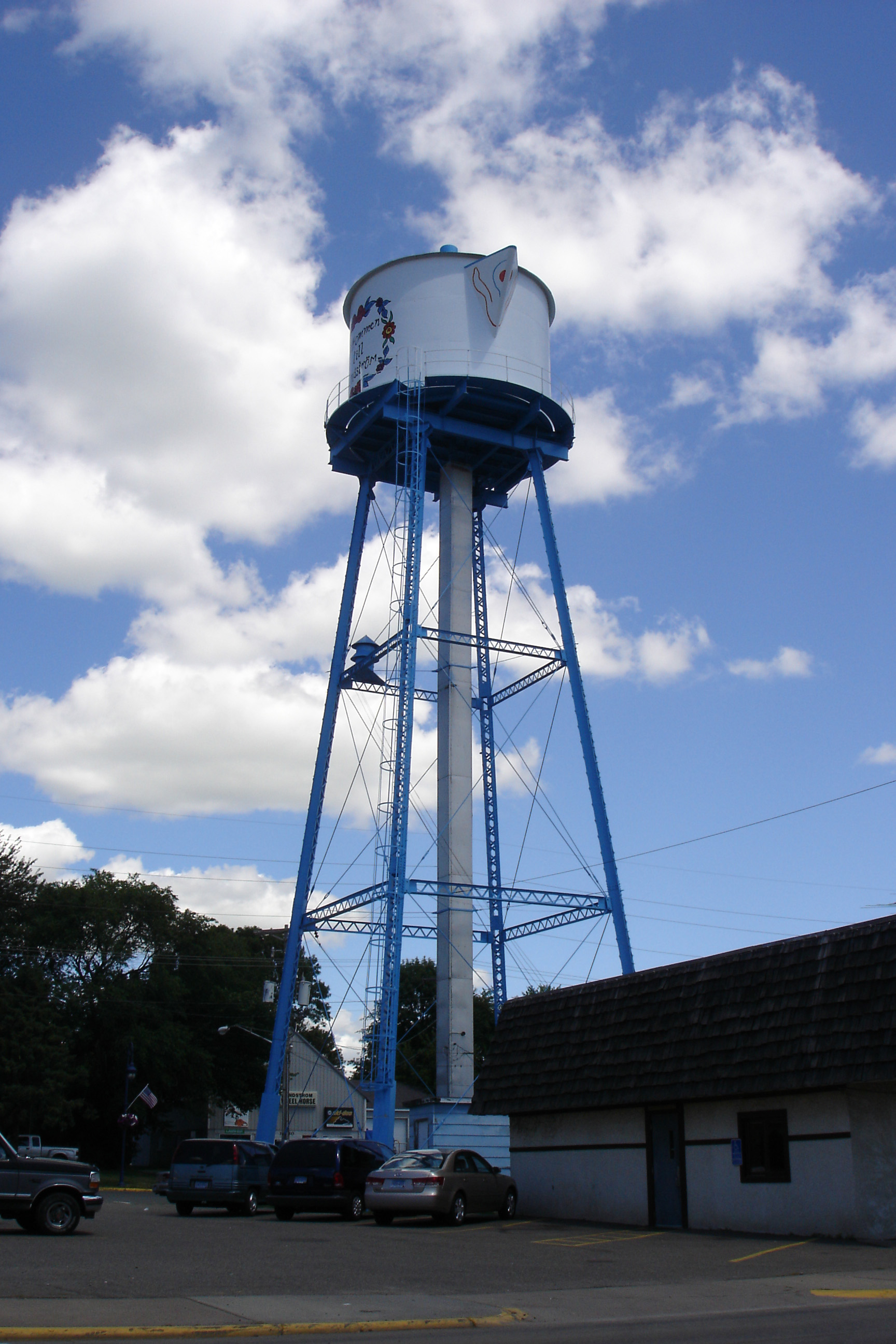
Lindström's old water tower, a community landmark

Lindström was settled predominantly by Swedish (and a few Norwegian) immigrants and their families. In 1853, Daniel Lindstrom left Sweden in search of a nice piece of land to settle in the United States. Lindström was platted in 1880. The town of Lindström was incorporated in 1894. Many other Swedish emigrants traveled with Daniel Lindstrom. Joris Per Anderson, half brother to Daniel Lindstrom came in 1850 leading a party from Hassela, Sweden. In the party was Eric Norelius, whose personal journals in part formed the basis of Vilhelm Moberg's novels of the Swedish emigration to the United States, The Emigrants. Moberg's novels have two main characters, Karl Oskar and Kristina Nilsson. The novels depict the hardships Swedish emigrants endured en route to the United States and their first ten years in their new home country. A bronze statue of the author, holding his bicycle as if ready to ride away, stands on a stepped platform in Chisago City's town park. An image of Karl Oskar and Kristina remains Lindström’s logo today. Since 1990, anyone who has taken U.S. Highway 8 from north of Forest Lake to Lindström has driven on the Moberg Trail.

Lindström celebrates Karl Oskar and Kristina annually with Karl Oskar Days. This event takes place mid-July and includes such activities as the coronation of a "Karl Oskar Ambassadors, parades, a street dance, and fireworks. There are still statues of Karl Oskar and Kristina in Lindström as a tribute to the early Swedish immigrants whose descendants continue to populate the area. These statues are the main attraction for tourists from all over the world who come to Lindström because of its Swedish heritage.

In April 2015, Minnesota Governor Mark Dayton signed an executive order to require the Minnesota Department of Transportation return umlauts to city-limit signs in Lindström, which had recently been removed. (However, both the USGS and the US Census Bureau record the city's name as "Lindstrom".)

== Education ==
Lindström is part of the Chisago Lakes School District #2144. There are five schools in the area, which accommodate around 3,600 students in grades K–12. The five schools in the district include Primary School (Grades Pre-K to 1), Lakeside School (Grades 2 to 5), Taylors Falls Elementary (Grades K to 5), Chisago Lakes Middle School (Grades 6 to 8), and Chisago Lakes High School (Grades 9 to 12). The school mascot is the Wally the Wildcat.

== Demographics ==
Historical population
Census	Pop.	Note	%±
1900	395		—
1910	522		32.2%
1920	523		0.2%
1930	561		7.3%
1940	637		13.5%
1950	729		14.4%
1960	835		14.5%
1970	1,260		50.9%
1980	1,972		56.5%
1990	2,461		24.8%
2000	3,015		22.5%
2010	4,442		47.3%
2020	4,888		10.0%
2023 (est.)	5,008		2.5%
U.S. Decennial Census; 2020 Census

=== 2020 census ===
As of the 2020 census, there were 4,888 people, 1,929 households, and 1,335 families residing in the city. The population density was 1,284.3 inhabitants per square mile (495.9/km^{2}), and there were 2,071 housing units. The median age was 41.3 years; 23.9% of residents were under the age of 18 and 18.5% were 65 years of age or older. For every 100 females, there were 97.7 males, and for every 100 females age 18 and over, there were 95.2 males age 18 and over.

95.5% of residents lived in urban areas, while 4.5% lived in rural areas.

Of the city's households, 32.7% had children under the age of 18 living in them. Of all households, 54.2% were married-couple households, 14.6% were households with a male householder and no spouse or partner present, and 23.0% were households with a female householder and no spouse or partner present. About 25.1% of all households were made up of individuals, and 11.9% had someone living alone who was 65 years of age or older. Of the 2,071 housing units, 6.9% were vacant; the homeowner vacancy rate was 1.0% and the rental vacancy rate was 4.4%. The average family size was 3.11 persons.

Lindstrom, Minnesota – Racial Composition (NH = Non-Hispanic) Note: the US Census treats Hispanic/Latino as an ethnic category. This table excludes Latinos from the racial categories and assigns them to a separate category. Hispanics/Latinos can be of any race.
Race	Number	Percentage
White (NH)	4,502	92.1%
Black or African American (NH)	34	0.7%
Native American or Alaska Native (NH)	5	0.1%
Asian (NH)	45	0.9%
Pacific Islander (NH)	0	0.0%
Some Other Race (NH)	8	0.2%
Mixed/Multi-Racial (NH)	201	4.1%
Hispanic or Latino	93	1.9%
Total	4,888	100.0%

In addition to the categories shown above, 97.7% of residents identified as White alone or in combination.

=== Demographic estimates ===
95.3% of residents had at least a high school education, and 30.1% had attained a bachelor's degree or higher. 6.4% were veterans.

93.0% of residents were born in the United States, and 77.3% had been born in Minnesota. Among the foreign-born population, 37.6% had been born in Northern America, 32.0% in Latin America, and 30.4% in Asia. 94.6% of residents spoke only English at home, and 3.7% spoke Spanish.

The most common ancestries in Lindström were German (42.8%), Norwegian (22.2%), Swedish (21.5%), Irish (9.4%), and Polish (4.8%).

Among workers 16 years and older, 76.8% commuted to work via car, 9.8% carpooled, 0.9% used public transit, and 7.8% worked from home. The median household income in Lindström was $103,102, above the state average. 5.7% of residents lived below the poverty line. 83.4% of housing in the city was owner-occupied.

=== 2010 census ===
As of the 2010 census, there were 4,442 people, 1,774 households, and 1,265 families residing in the city. The population density was 1,232.4 inhabitants per square mile (475.8/km^{2}). There were 1,943 housing units at an average density of 539.7 inhabitants per square mile (208.4/km^{2}). The racial makeup of the city was 97.0% White, 0.4% African American, 0.2% Native American, 0.6% Asian, 0.3% from other races, and 1.4% from two or more races. Hispanic or Latino of any race were 1.2% of the population.

There were 1,774 households, of which 34.2% had children under the age of 18 living with them, 56.9% were married couples living together, 9.9% had a female householder with no husband present, 4.6% had a male householder with no wife present, and 28.7% were non-families. 23.5% of all households were made up of individuals, and 11.5% had someone living alone who was 65 years of age or older. The average household size was 2.50 and the average family size was 2.96.

The median age in the city was 39.1 years. 25.8% of residents were under the age of 18; 5.6% were between the ages of 18 and 24; 26.7% were from 25 to 44; 25.5% were from 45 to 64; and 16.2% were 65 years of age or older. The gender makeup of the city was 49.9% male and 50.1% female.

=== 2000 census ===
As of the 2000 census, there were 3,015 people, 1,225 households, and 855 families residing in the city. The population density was 1,332.1 inhabitants per square mile (514.3/km^{2}). There were 1,322 housing units at an average density of 584.1 inhabitants per square mile (225.5/km^{2}). The racial makeup of the city was 97.61% White, 0.20% African American, 0.36% Native American, 0.50% Asian, 0.56% from other races, and 0.76% from two or more races. Hispanic or Latino of any race were 1.13% of the population. 25.1% were of German, 22.8% Swedish, 12.8% Norwegian, 7.9% French and 6.3% Irish ancestry. 100.0% spoke English as their first language.

There were 1,225 households, out of which 31.1% had children under the age of 18 living with them, 58.4% were married couples living together, 8.2% had a female householder with no husband present, and 30.2% were non-families. 25.7% of all households were made up of individuals, and 13.6% had someone living alone who was 65 years of age or older. The average household size was 2.46 and the average family size was 2.95.

In the city, the population was spread out, with 26.0% under the age of 18, 6.8% from 18 to 24, 26.5% from 25 to 44, 22.5% from 45 to 64, and 18.1% who were 65 years of age or older. The median age was 39 years. For every 100 females, there were 95.8 males. For every 100 females age 18 and over, there were 90.7 males.

The median income for a household in the city was $44,980, and the median income for a family was $50,519. Males had a median income of $42,604 versus $28,163 for females. The per capita income for the city was $21,195. About 5.7% of families and 8.0% of the population were below the poverty line, including 8.6% of those under age 18 and 13.9% of those age 65 or over.

== Sister cities ==
- Tingsryd, Sweden

== See also ==
- Chisago Lakes School District
- Swedish Americans
- Norwegian Americans
- Nordic Americans
- Ö
