= Harris, Minnesota =

City in Minnesota, United States

Harris
- City
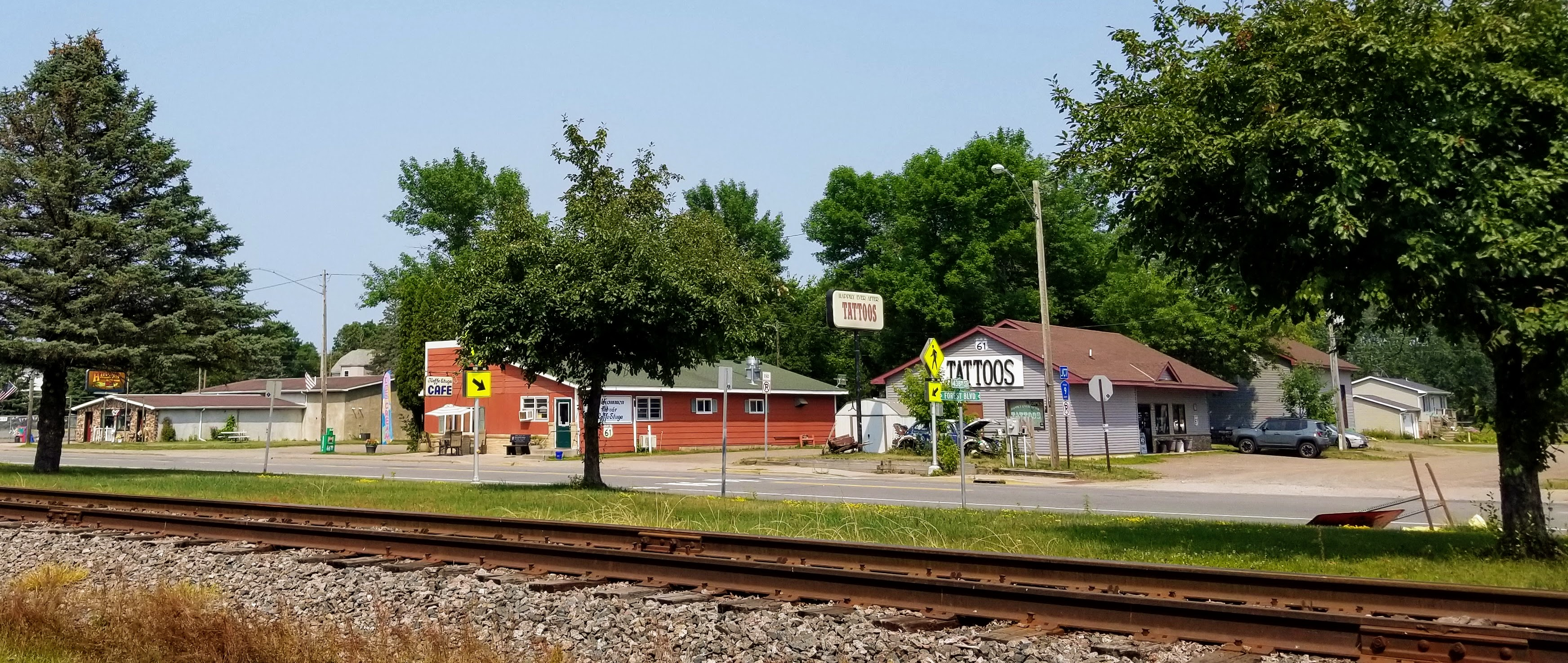
- Businesses along Forest Boulevard.

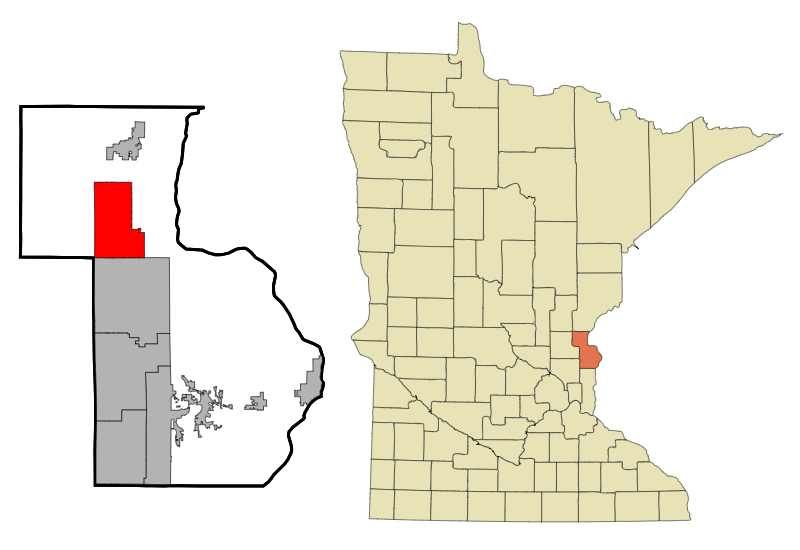
- Location of the city of Harris within Chisago County, Minnesota
- Coordinates: 45°35′37″N 92°58′49″W
- Country: United States
- State: Minnesota
- County: Chisago

Government
  - Mayor: Lance Kociemba

Area
  - Total: 20.08 sq mi (52.01 km^{2})
  - Land: 19.96 sq mi (51.70 km^{2})
  - Water: 0.12 sq mi (0.32 km^{2})
- Elevation: 922 ft (281 m)

Population (2020)
  - Total: 1,111
  - Density: 55.7/sq mi (21.49/km^{2})
- Time zone: UTC-6 (Central (CST))
  - Summer (DST): UTC-5 (CDT)
- ZIP code: 55032
- Area code: 651
- FIPS code: 27-27278
- GNIS feature ID: 2394302
- Website: www.harrismn.com

Harris is a city in Chisago County, Minnesota, United States. As of the 2020 census, Harris had a population of 1,111. There is a restaurant, a post office, a bar and grill, and tattoo shop, among other businesses. Interstate 35 serves as a main route for the community.

== Geography ==
According to the United States Census Bureau, the city has a total area of 20.06 square miles (51.96 km^{2}), of which 19.94 square miles (51.64 km^{2}) is land and 0.12 square miles (0.31 km^{2}) is water.

== History ==
Harris was platted in 1873, and incorporated as a city in 1883. It was named after Philip S. Harris, an officer of the St. Paul and Duluth Railroad Company. A post office has been in operation in Harris since 1874.

On April 11, 1933, a pregnant woman and her seven children died in a house fire at a farm in Harris. Her husband was charged with murder but was never found.

On September 11, 2026, Mayor Lance Kociemba dedicated the Harris 9/11 Memorial on the 25th anniversary of the event.

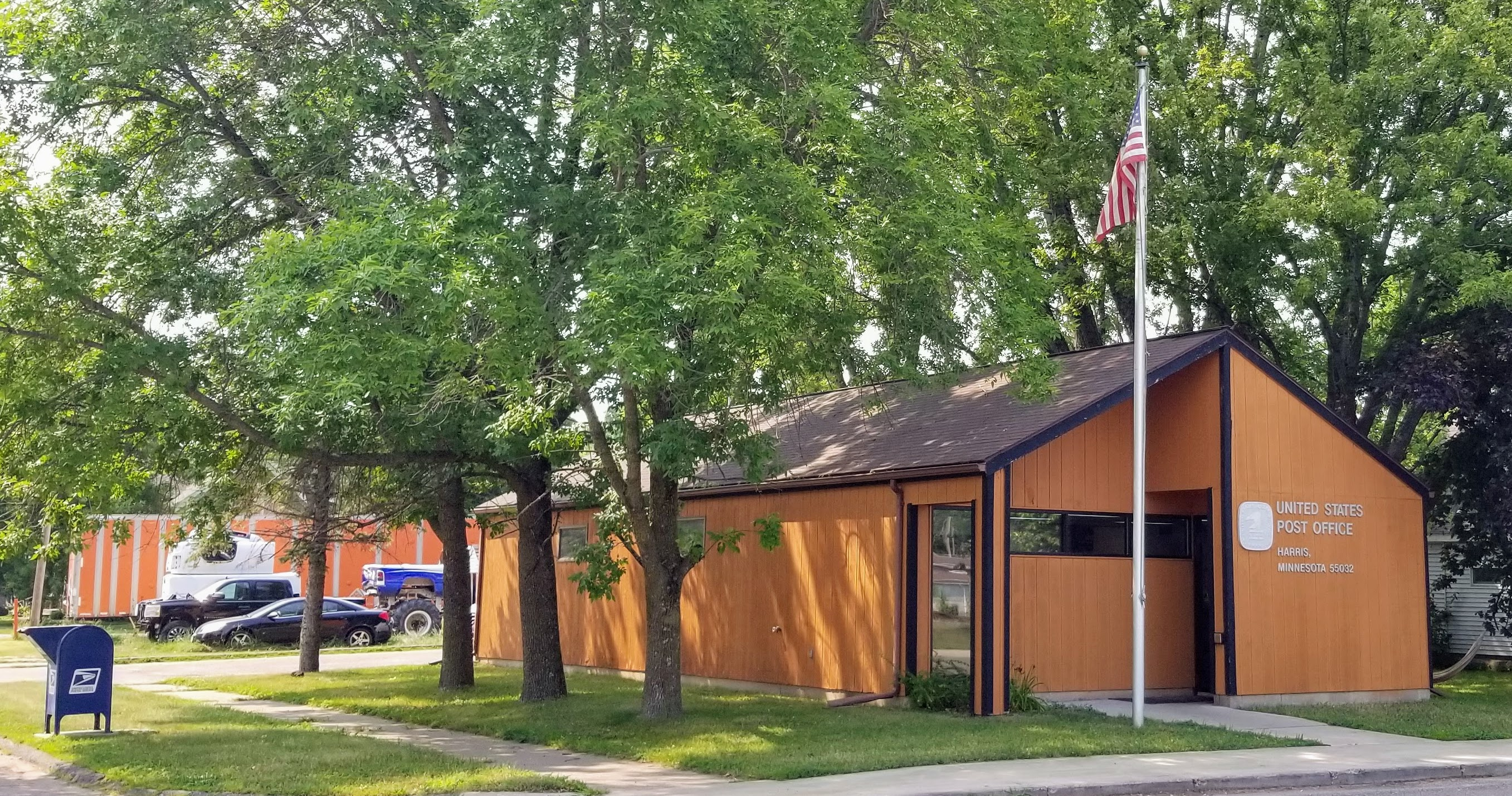
The Harris post office.

== Demographics ==
Historical population
Census	Pop.	Note	%±
1890	504		—
1900	710		40.9%
1910	673		−5.2%
1920	672		−0.1%
1930	584		−13.1%
1940	609		4.3%
1950	569		−6.6%
1960	552		−3.0%
1970	559		1.3%
1980	678		21.3%
1990	843		24.3%
2000	1,121		33.0%
2010	1,132		1.0%
2020	1,111		−1.9%
U.S. Decennial Census

=== 2010 census ===
As of the census of 2010, there were 1,132 people, 423 households, and 315 families living in the city. The population density was 56.8 inhabitants per square mile (21.9/km^{2}). There were 449 housing units at an average density of 22.5 units per square mile (8.7 units/km^{2}). The racial makeup of the city was 97.3% White, 0.9% African American, 0.9% Native American, 0.1% Asian, 0.3% from other races, and 0.6% from two or more races. Hispanic or Latino of any race were 1.6% of the population.

There were 423 households, of which 32.6% had children under the age of 18 living with them, 60.8% were married couples living together, 6.6% had a female householder with no husband present, 7.1% had a male householder with no wife present, and 25.5% were non-families. 20.1% of all households were made up of individuals, and 7.1% had someone living alone who was 65 years of age or older. The average household size was 2.66 and the average family size was 3.02.

The median age in the city was 41.8 years. 22.7% of residents were under the age of 18; 7.7% were between the ages of 18 and 24; 25.9% were from 25 to 44; 32% were from 45 to 64; and 11.7% were 65 years of age or older. The gender makeup of the city was 53.1% male and 46.9% female.

=== 2000 census ===
As of the census of 2000, there were 1,121 people, 377 households, and 286 families living in the city. The population density was 56.7 inhabitants per square mile (21.9/km^{2}). There were 393 housing units at an average density of 19.9 units per square mile (7.7 units/km^{2}). The racial makeup of the city was 97.77% White, 0.36% African American, 0.45% Native American, 0.27% Asian, 0.54% from other races, and 0.62% from two or more races. Hispanic or Latino of any race were 1.52% of the population.

There were 377 households, out of which 42.7% had children under the age of 18 living with them, 63.4% were married couples living together, 6.4% had a female householder with no husband present, and 23.9% were non-families. 19.6% of all households were made up of individuals, and 8.5% had someone living alone who was 65 years of age or older. The average household size was 2.97 and the average family size was 3.37.

In the city, the population was spread out, with 32.7% under the age of 18, 6.7% from 18 to 24, 33.0% from 25 to 44, 19.5% from 45 to 64, and 8.0% who were 65 years of age or older. The median age was 34 years. For every 100 females, there were 114.3 males. For every 100 females age 18 and over, there were 111.2 males.

The median income for a household in the city was $49,545, and the median income for a family was $51,719. Males had a median income of $37,917 versus $25,703 for females. The per capita income for the city was $18,258. About 1.8% of families and 4.9% of the population were below the poverty line, including 3.5% of those under age 18 and 15.6% of those age 65 or over.

== Notable people ==
- Charles A. Peterson, Wisconsin State Assemblyman, was born in Harris.
- Lonnie Hammargren, famed neurosurgeon and former Lt. Governor of the State of Nevada
