= Taylors Falls, Minnesota =

City in Minnesota, United States

Taylors Falls
- City
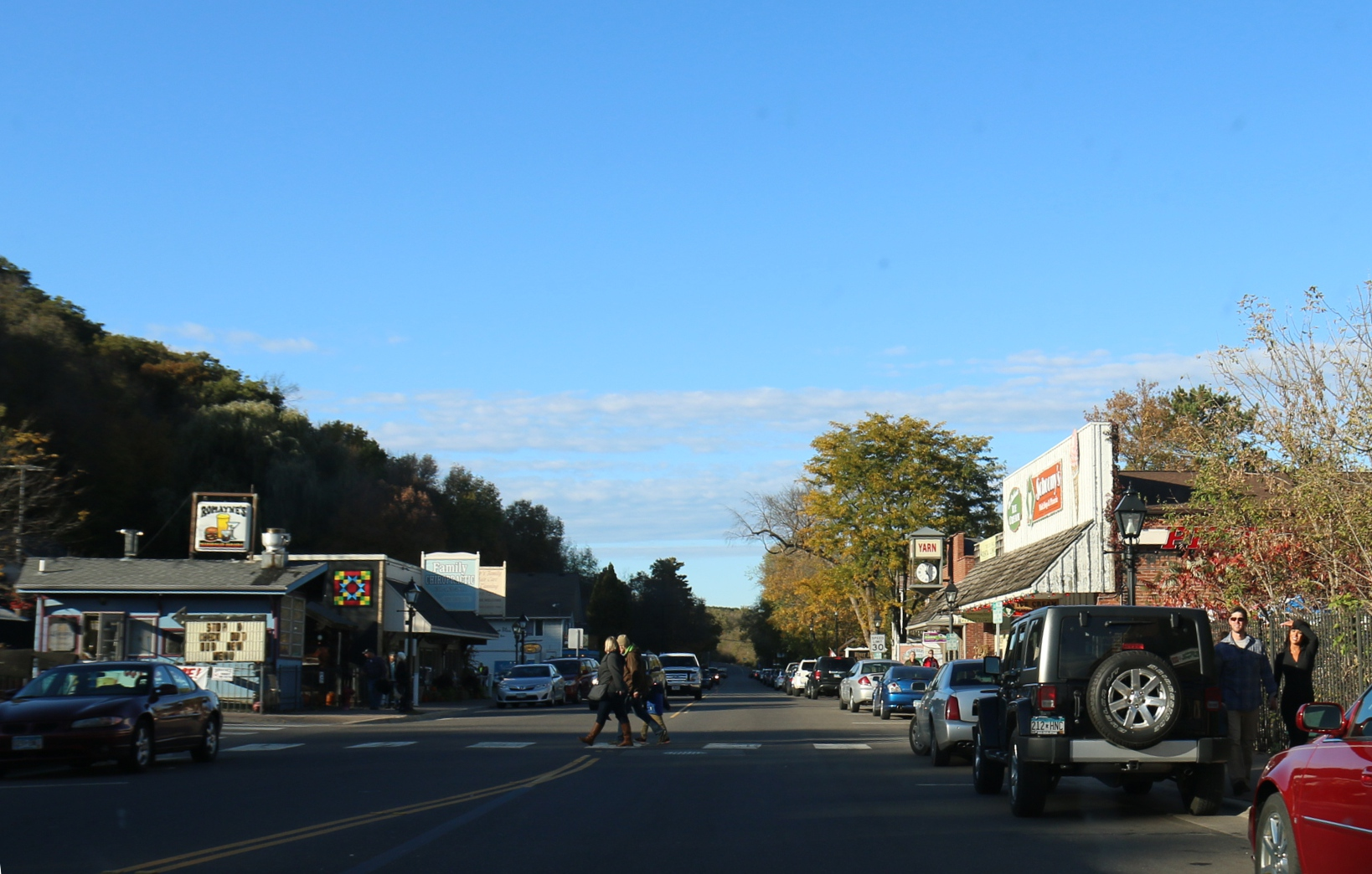
- Downtown Taylors Falls on MN95
- Motto: "Village On The River"
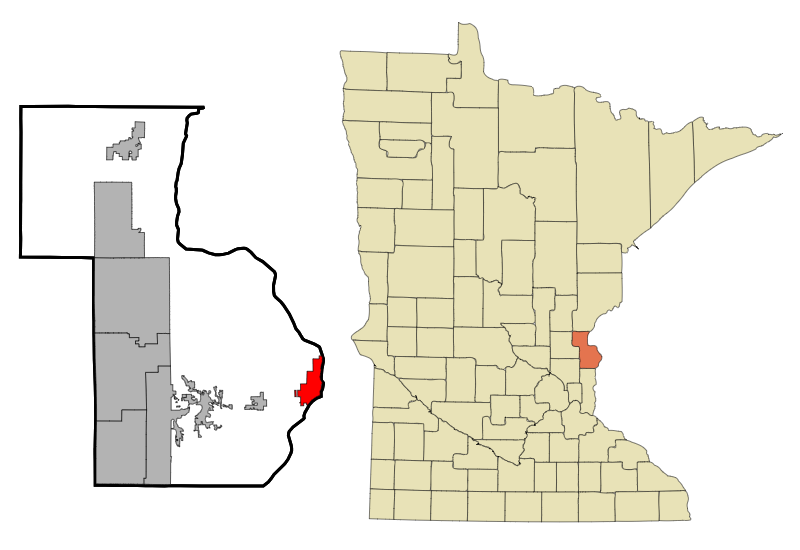
- Location of the city of Taylors Falls within Chisago County, Minnesota
- Coordinates: 45°24′44″N 92°39′52″W
- Country: United States
- State: Minnesota
- County: Chisago

Area
  - Total: 4.236 sq mi (10.97 km^{2})
  - Land: 3.941 sq mi (10.21 km^{2})
  - Water: 0.295 sq mi (0.76 km^{2})
- Elevation: 945 ft (288 m)

Population (2020)
  - Total: 1,055
  - Density: 268/sq mi (103.4/km^{2})
- Time zone: UTC-6 (Central (CST))
  - Summer (DST): UTC-5 (CDT)
- ZIP code: 55084
- Area code: 651
- FIPS code: 27-64318
- GNIS feature ID: 2396034
- Website: https://taylorsfallsmn.gov/

Taylors Falls is a city in Chisago County, Minnesota, United States, located at the junction of U.S. Highway 8 and Minnesota State Highway 95. The population was 1,055 at the 2020 census.

== History ==
Taylors Falls was platted in 1850 or 1851, and incorporated in 1858. The city was named for Jesse Taylor, a territorial politician. A post office has been in operation in Taylors Falls since 1851.

During the logging era, Taylors Falls was the site of numerous log jams, most notably the 1886 St. Croix river log jam, a major tourist attraction.

== Geography ==
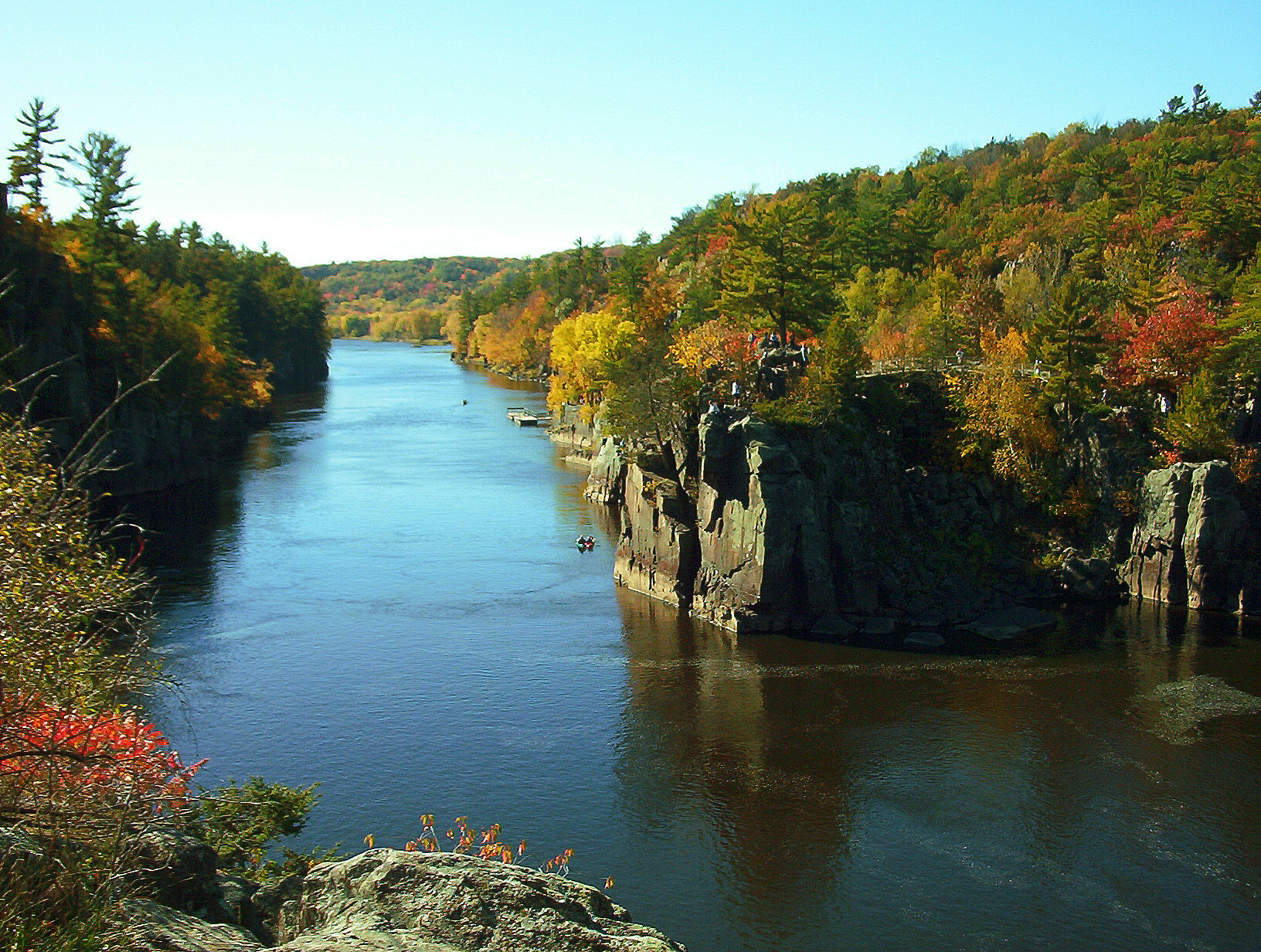
Dalles of the St. Croix River, on the Wisconsin bank, near Taylors Falls

According to the United States Census Bureau, the city has a total area of 4.24 square miles (10.98 km^{2}), of which 3.94 square miles (10.20 km^{2}) is land and 0.29 square miles (0.75 km^{2}) is water.

Taylors Falls is located adjacent to St. Croix Falls, Wisconsin, at the Dalles of the St. Croix River, an area of forested bluffs and high cliffs. The first interstate state park in the United States, aptly named Interstate Park, was jointly founded by the states of Minnesota and Wisconsin in 1895, and straddles the border of the two states immediately south of the city.

== Demographics ==
Historical population
Census	Pop.	Note	%±
1880	1,007		—
1890	567		−43.7%
1900	535		−5.6%
1910	454		−15.1%
1920	570		25.6%
1930	527		−7.5%
1940	552		4.7%
1950	520		−5.8%
1960	546		5.0%
1970	587		7.5%
1980	623		6.1%
1990	694		11.4%
2000	951		37.0%
2010	976		2.6%
2020	1,055		8.1%
U.S. Decennial Census

=== 2020 census ===
As of the census of 2020, the population was 1,055. The population density was 267.7 inhabitants per square mile (103.4/km^{2}). There were 490 housing units at an average density of 124.3 per square mile (48.0/km^{2}). The racial makeup of the city was 91.8% White, 1.3% Black or African American, 0.9% Asian, 0.6% Native American, 0.4% from other races, and 5.0% from two or more races. Ethnically, the population was 1.3% Hispanic or Latino of any race.

=== 2010 census ===
At the 2010 census there were 976 people in 413 households, including 261 families, in the city. The population density was 238.0 inhabitants per square mile (91.9/km^{2}). There were 457 housing units at an average density of 111.5 per square mile (43.1/km^{2}). The racial makeup of the city was 94.4% White, 0.6% African American, 0.7% Native American, 2.5% Asian, 0.4% from other races, and 1.4% from two or more races. Hispanic or Latino of any race were 0.5%.

Of the 413 households 30.0% had children under the age of 18 living with them, 47.7% were married couples living together, 9.7% had a female householder with no husband present, 5.8% had a male householder with no wife present, and 36.8% were non-families. 29.8% of households were one person and 8.9% were one person aged 65 or older. The average household size was 2.35 and the average family size was 2.89.

The median age was 41.7 years. 23.7% of residents were under the age of 18; 6.7% were between the ages of 18 and 24; 23.5% were from 25 to 44; 30% were from 45 to 64; and 16.1% were 65 or older. The gender makeup of the city was 48.6% male and 51.4% female.

=== 2000 census ===
At the 2000 census there were 951 people in 369 households, including 247 families, in the city. The population density was 255.6 inhabitants per square mile (98.7/km^{2}). There were 386 housing units at an average density of 103.7 per square mile (40.0/km^{2}). The racial makeup of the city was 91.48% White, 0.32% Native American, 7.05% Asian, 0.21% Pacific Islander, 0.21% from other races, and 0.74% from two or more races. Hispanic or Latino of any race were 0.74%.

Of the 369 households 34.7% had children under the age of 18 living with them, 51.2% were married couples living together, 12.2% had a female householder with no husband present, and 32.8% were non-families. 26.0% of households were one person and 11.7% were one person aged 65 or older. The average household size was 2.57 and the average family size was 3.11.

The age distribution was 29.8% under the age of 18, 7.5% from 18 to 24, 29.5% from 25 to 44, 19.3% from 45 to 64, and 13.9% 65 or older. The median age was 35 years. For every 100 females, there were 96.5 males. For every 100 females age 18 and over, there were 87.6 males.

The median household income was $35,250 and the median family income was $39,886. Males had a median income of $40,357 versus $24,250 for females. The per capita income for the city was $17,615. About 11.5% of families and 20.0% of the population were below the poverty line, including 35.4% of those under age 18 and 9.5% of those age 65 or over.

== Notable structures ==
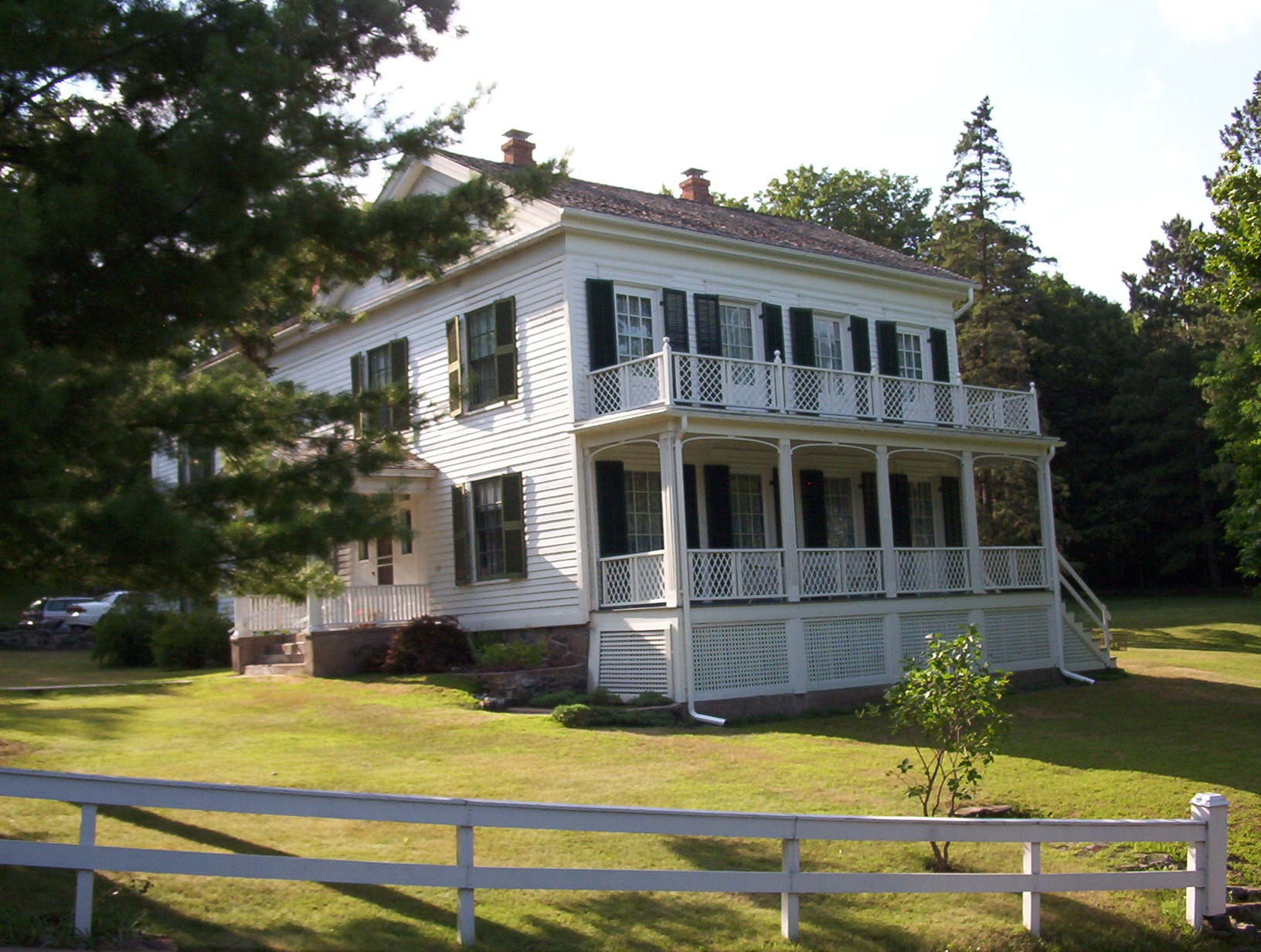
The Folsom House, in Taylors Falls's Angel Hill District.

Historic building in Taylor Falls include the Folsom House, located in the historic Angel Hill District, the Old Jail, and the Taylors Falls Public Library. Taylors Falls also has the oldest public schoolhouse in Minnesota, built in 1852.

== Parks and recreation ==
Interstate State Park is located on the east side of Taylors Falls. The park hosts scenic river views, canoeing, camping, fishing, rock climbing, and glacial potholes. The Minnesota side of Interstate State Park has a variety of bouldering, toprope, and traditional climbing ranging from 5.5 to 5.13.

== In popular culture ==
Taylors Falls was the location where the main characters of Vilhelm Moberg's Swedish novel The Emigrants first settled. It was adapted into a film, and later a musical called Kristina från Duvemåla.

== See also ==
- Citizens for the St. Croix Valley political organization
