= North Branch, Minnesota =

City in Minnesota, United States

North Branch
- City
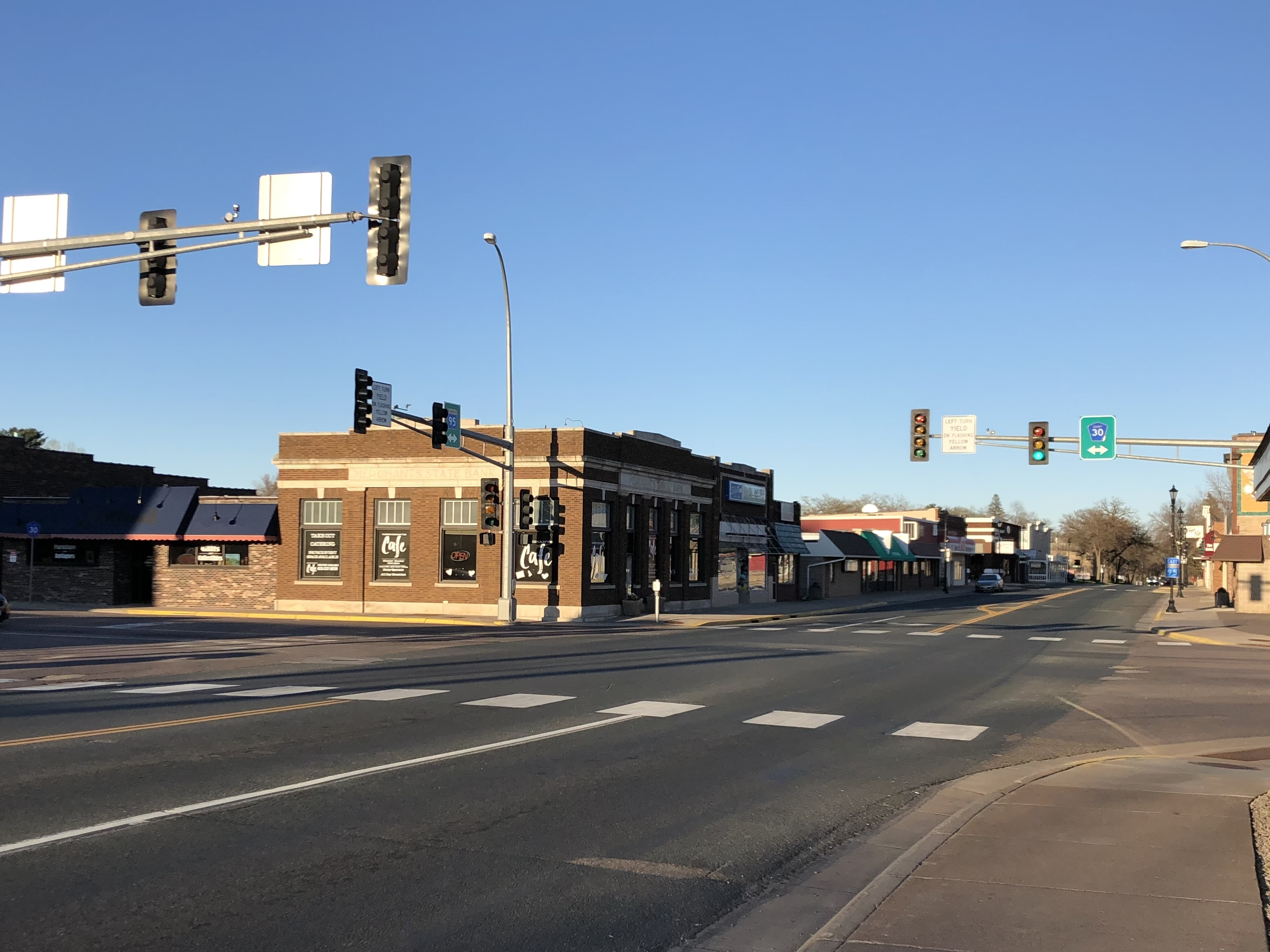
- Downtown North Branch

- Location of the city of North Branch within Chisago County, Minnesota
- Coordinates: 45°30′43″N 92°58′49″W
- Country: United States
- State: Minnesota
- County: Chisago

Government
  - Type: Weak mayor–council
  - Body: North Branch City Council
  - Mayor: Kevin Schieber

Area
  - Total: 36.03 sq mi (93.33 km^{2})
  - Land: 35.60 sq mi (92.20 km^{2})
  - Water: 0.44 sq mi (1.13 km^{2})
- Elevation: 876 ft (267 m)

Population (2020)
  - Total: 10,787
  - Estimate (2021): 11,113
  - Density: 303.0/sq mi (116.99/km^{2})
- Time zone: UTC-6 (CST)
  - Summer (DST): UTC-5 (CDT)
- ZIP code: 55056
- Area code: 651
- FIPS code: 27-46798
- GNIS feature ID: 2395250
- Website: www.northbranchmn.gov

North Branch is a city in Chisago County, Minnesota, United States, at the junction of Interstate 35 and the Minnesota State Highway 95. Its population was 10,787 at the 2020 census. It is named for the north branch of the Sunrise River, which flows through the city of North Branch.

== Geography ==
According to the United States Census Bureau, the city has a total area of 36.04 square miles (93.34 km^{2}), of which, 35.60 square miles (92.20 km^{2}) is land and 0.44 square miles (1.14 km^{2}) is water.

== History ==
North Branch became a township in 1861, and incorporated in 1881. In 1901 North Branch split into a village covering the more densely populated downtown area and a township covering the rest of the former village. The township later incorporated as the village of Branch in 1961. The two cities talked about a potential merger for years, beginning in the late 1970s. The first public referendum on the issue was held in 1984, and failed. A second referendum was held on September 13, 1994, and passed. The two cities officially merged on November 14, 1994.

Arrowhead Transit provides public bus routes and Dial-A-Ride in North Branch as of 2022.

== Demographics ==
Historical population
Census	Pop.	Note	%±
1880	142		—
1890	685		382.4%
1900	1,211		76.8%
1910	642		−47.0%
1920	742		15.6%
1930	691		−6.9%
1940	762		10.3%
1950	769		0.9%
1960	949		23.4%
1970	1,106		16.5%
1980	1,597		44.4%
1990	1,867		16.9%
2000	8,023		329.7%
2010	10,125		26.2%
2020	10,787		6.5%
2021 (est.)	11,113		3.0%
U.S. Decennial Census; 2020 Census

=== 2020 census ===
As of the 2020 census, North Branch had a population of 10,787. The median age was 37.1 years. 25.4% of residents were under the age of 18 and 14.0% of residents were 65 years of age or older. For every 100 females there were 101.3 males, and for every 100 females age 18 and over there were 99.9 males age 18 and over.

59.0% of residents lived in urban areas, while 41.0% lived in rural areas.

There were 3,932 households in North Branch, of which 35.1% had children under the age of 18 living in them. Of all households, 54.2% were married-couple households, 15.2% were households with a male householder and no spouse or partner present, and 19.4% were households with a female householder and no spouse or partner present. About 21.8% of all households were made up of individuals and 10.6% had someone living alone who was 65 years of age or older.

There were 4,090 housing units, of which 3.9% were vacant. The homeowner vacancy rate was 1.0% and the rental vacancy rate was 8.9%.

95.0% of residents identified as White alone or in combination with another race.

Racial composition as of the 2020 census
Race	Number	Percent
White	9,689	89.8%
Black or African American	116	1.1%
American Indian and Alaska Native	77	0.7%
Asian	222	2.1%
Native Hawaiian and Other Pacific Islander	1	0.0%
Some other race	111	1.0%
Two or more races	571	5.3%
Hispanic or Latino (of any race)	328	3.0%

=== Demographic estimates ===
According to U.S. Census Bureau data, 94% of residents had at least a high school education, and 20.5% had attained a bachelor's degree or higher. 4.9% were veterans.

98.9% of residents were born in the United States, and 80.4% had been born in Minnesota. Among the foreign-born population, 85.0% were naturalized US citizens, the majority of whom were born in Asia. 97.3% of residents spoke only English at home.

The most common ancestries in North Branch were German (30.3%), Swedish (14.5%), Norwegian (13.2%), Irish (7.1%), and Polish (4.1%). Among cities with at least 10,000 people, North Branch has the highest concentration of people with Swedish ancestry in the United States.

=== Income and poverty ===
Among workers 16 years and older, 81.6% commuted to work via car, 10.6% carpooled, 0.9% used public transit, and 2.4% walked, biked, or used some other method. 5.0% worked from home. The median household income in North Branch was $85,213, slightly above the state average. 9.2% of residents lived below the poverty line, and 2.3% were unemployed. 85.8% of housing in the city was owner-occupied.

The average family size in North Branch was 3.21 persons, and 60.1% of households were married-couple families.

=== 2010 census ===
As of the census of 2010, there were 10,125 people, 3,604 households, and 2,591 families living in the city. The population density was 284.4 inhabitants per square mile (109.8/km^{2}). There were 3,767 housing units at an average density of 105.8 units per square mile (40.8 units/km^{2}). The racial makeup of the city was 96.6% White, 0.5% African American, 0.4% Native American, 0.8% Asian, 0.3% from other races, and 1.3% from two or more races. Hispanic or Latino of any race were 1.9% of the population.

There were 3,604 households, of which 42.4% had children under the age of 18 living with them, 57.3% were married couples living together, 9.8% had a female householder with no husband present, 4.9% had a male householder with no wife present, and 28.1% were non-families. 21.2% of all households were made up of individuals, and 9.1% had someone living alone who was 65 years of age or older. The average household size was 2.77 and the average family size was 3.25.

The median age in the city was 34.3 years. 29.3% of residents were under the age of 18; 7.7% were between the ages of 18 and 24; 30.4% were from 25 to 44; 22.2% were from 45 to 64; and 10.3% were 65 years of age or older. The gender makeup of the city was 49.8% male and 50.2% female.

=== 2000 census ===
As of the census of 2000, there were 8,023 people, 2,815 households, and 2,147 families living in the city. The population density was 224.9 inhabitants per square mile (86.8/km^{2}). There were 2,900 housing units at an average density of 81.3 units per square mile (31.4 units/km^{2}). The racial makeup of the city was 97.27% White, 0.16% African American, 0.49% Native American, 1.03% Asian, 0.04% Pacific Islander, 0.21% from other races, and 0.80% from two or more races. Hispanic or Latino of any race were 1.36% of the population.

There were 2,815 households, out of which 45.1% had children under the age of 18 living with them, 61.2% were married couples living together, 10.8% had a female householder with no husband present, and 23.7% were non-families. 18.7% of all households were made up of individuals, and 7.1% had someone living alone who was 65 years of age or older. The average household size was 2.85 and the average family size was 3.24.

In the city, the population was spread out, with 33.0% under the age of 18, 7.9% from 18 to 24, 34.5% from 25 to 44, 16.5% from 45 to 64, and 8.1% who were 65 years of age or older. The median age was 30 years. For every 100 females, there were 99.6 males. For every 100 females age 18 and over, there were 95.3 males.

The median income for a household in the city was $50,294, and the median income for a family was $56,512. Males had a median income of $39,478 versus $26,424 for females. The per capita income for the city was $20,875. About 3.1% of families and 5.0% of the population were below the poverty line, including 6.6% of those under age 18 and 5.0% of those age 65 or over.

== Public schools ==
- Sunrise River Elementary School
- North Branch Area Middle School
- North Branch Area High School
- Phoenix Academy of Art and Science K-6

== Notable people ==
- William J. Duffy – (1916–2013), jurist and legislator; served in the Wisconsin State Assembly 1949–1950, and was elected a Wisconsin Circuit Court judge for Brown County, Wisconsin serving until his retirement in 1992, born in North Branch
- Thomas H. Horton - (1859–1943), farmer and legislator
- Janet Johnson – Minnesota state senator
- Mark Koran – member of the Minnesota Senate
- Jon Lucivansky – NFL official 2009-2018
- Doug Mahnke – comic book writer
- Anne Neu – member of the Minnesota House of Representatives
- Rick Olseen – former member of the Minnesota Senate
- Matt Patrick, producer
- Becky Pearson – one-time LPGA Tour winning golfer and two-time winner of the Minnesota Junior Girls State Championship
- Lee Quillen – former baseball player for Chicago White Sox
- Richard Warren Sears – telegraph operator and founder of Sears, Roebuck and Company
- Maynard W. Tollberg – sailor

== In popular culture ==
- North Branch is the hometown of the character Tulip Olsen in the Cartoon Network/HBO Max animated science fiction thriller series Infinity Train.
