= Saint Croix Falls Dam =

Hydroelectric dam in St. Croix Falls, Wisconsin

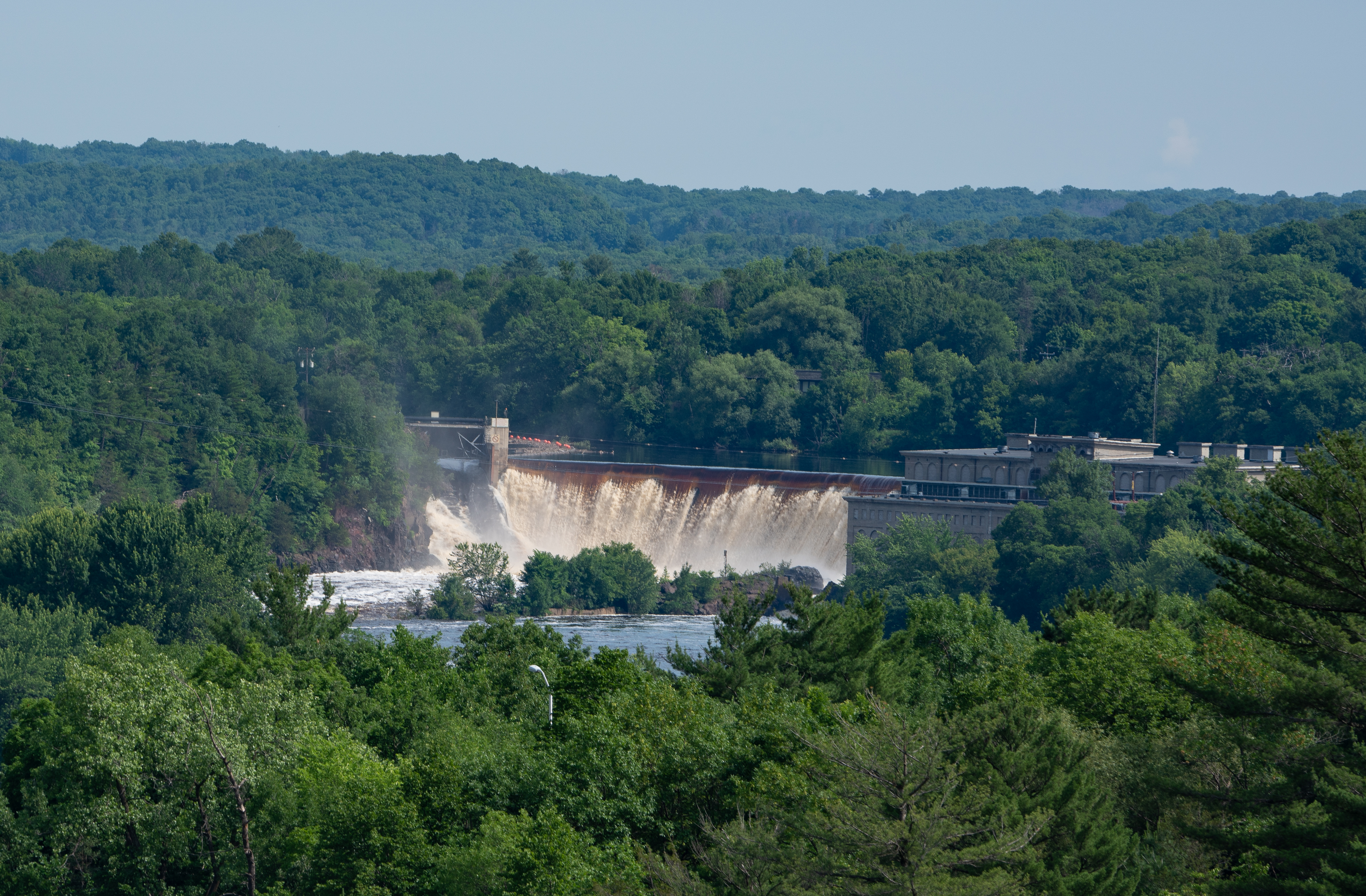
- Dam, as seen from a hiking trail viewpoint at Wisconsin Interstate Park.

- Location within Wisconsin Location within Minnesota
- Location: St. Croix Falls, Wisconsin
- Coordinates: 45°24′43.4″N 92°38′49.6″W
- Purpose: Power
- Construction began: 1905
- Opening date: 1907
- Operator: Xcel Energy

Dam and spillways
- Type of dam: Arch-gravity dam
- Impounds: St. Croix River
- Height: 60 ft (18 m)
- Length: Total: 1,760 ft (540 m); Arch segment: 675 ft (206 m)

Reservoir
- Creates: Indianhead Flowage
- Total capacity: 27,500 acre⋅ft (0.0339 km^{3})

Power Station
- Installed capacity: 25.9 MW

Saint Croix Falls Dam, also known as St. Croix Falls Dam, is a hydroelectric dam on the St. Croix River between St. Croix Falls, Wisconsin and Taylors Falls, Minnesota. The only remaining hydroelectric dam on the St. Croix River, it is operated by Xcel Energy.

== History ==
The natural Saint Croix Falls was a series of rapids with a drop of about 55 feet (17 m) over six miles (9.7 km). The water power served the lumber industry in the nineteenth century before the construction of the current hydroelectric dam from 1905 to 1907.

=== Lumber industry ===
In 1837 Franklin Steele organized a company to build a small dam and sawmill at the falls. Caleb Cushing purchased the sawmill in 1846, but the property became entangled in legal disputes and had little commercial success. The early mill fell into disrepair, and in 1869 the local Polk County Press wrote that while "industrious relic hunters might find there a dam by a mill site, they would not find a mill by a dam site." A variation of this quote now appears on a historical marker near the dam.

Development for the lumber industry resumed in 1889, when William Sauntry built the wood-pile Nevers Dam eleven miles (18 km) upstream to help Friedrich Weyerhäuser control the flow of timber rafts after the 1886 St. Croix River log jam. Clear cutting and forest fires began to exhaust the area's lumber supply in the first decade of the twentieth century.

=== Hydroelectricity ===
In 1903, the Minneapolis General Electric Company, managed by Boston-based Stone & Webster, purchased control of both the falls and the Nevers Dam upstream in order to generate hydroelectricity for the growing city of Minneapolis. The company constructed the present concrete dam and power station from 1905 to 1907. The power station originally utilized four Westinghouse generators with a combined output of 10,000 kilowatts. Electricity was delivered to Minneapolis via a 40-mile (64 km), 50,000 volt copper transmission line. The dam originally included a wooden fish ladder on the east end and a steel "bear trap" sluice gate on the west end that could be raised or lowered to permit the passage of timber rafts downriver.

The H. M. Byllesby Company, precursor to the Northern States Power Company, purchased the dam in 1913. In addition to the Saint Croix Falls dam, the company continued to operate the older Nevers Dam upstream to regulate the flow of water into the power station. The Nevers Dam was badly damaged by flooding in 1954 and demolished the following year.

The dam became the property of Xcel Energy in 1998 when Northern States Power merged with other utilities. The power station has been upgraded several times and now has a capacity of 25.9 MW.

== Structure ==
The Saint Croix Falls Dam is a concrete hybrid arch-gravity dam with an S-shaped spillway and an integral hydroelectric power station. The main arch is 675 feet (206 m) long and the power station is 291 feet (89 m), located on the east side of the river in Wisconsin. The dam also includes a 785-foot (239 m) concrete dike on the west side of the river in Minnesota.

== See also ==
- Dalles of the St. Croix River, a park
