= Wild River State Park =

State park in Minnesota, United States

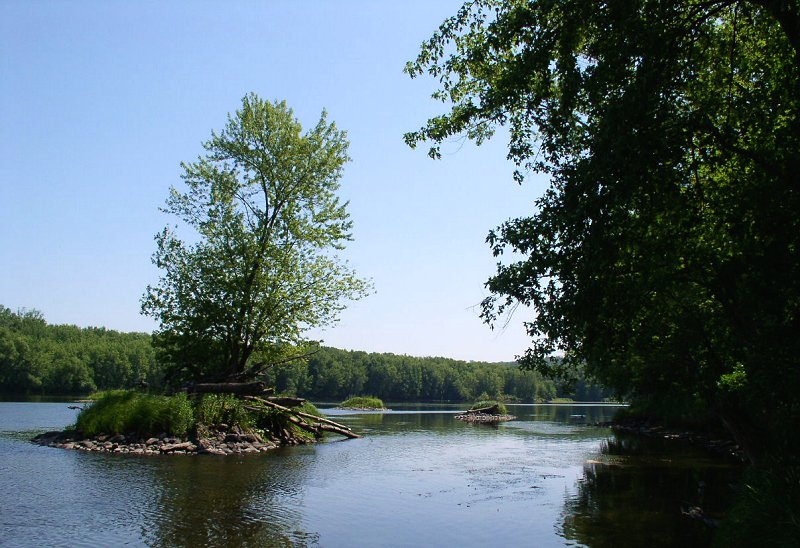
- Wild River State Park protects shoreline along the St. Croix, a National Wild and Scenic River

- Location within Minnesota Location within the United States
- Location: Chisago, Minnesota, United States
- Coordinates: 45°34′5″N 92°52′33″W
- Area: 6,574 acres (26.60 km^{2})
- Elevation: 774 ft (236 m)
- Established: 1973
- Governing body: Minnesota Department of Natural Resources
- Point Douglas to Superior Military Road: Deer Creek Section
- U.S. National Register of Historic Places
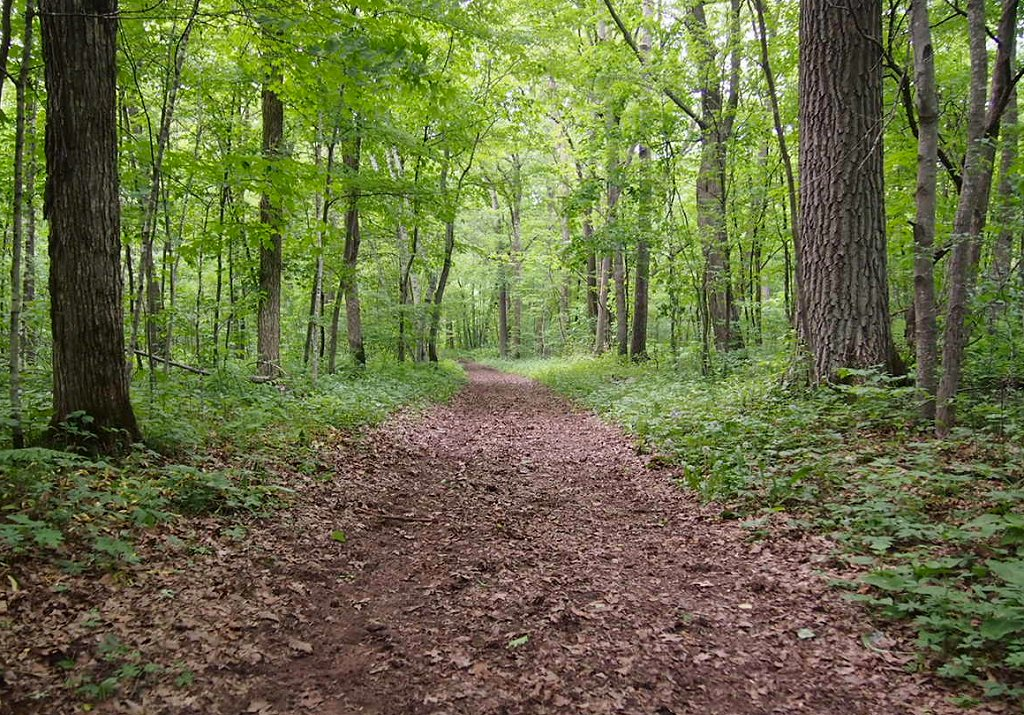
- Park trail following the route of the Point Douglas to Superior Military Road
- Location: Amador Township
- Coordinates: 45°30′22″N 92°43′4″W
- Area: 2.2 acres (0.9 ha)
- Built: 1853
- Built by: John Rollins
- Engineer: James Hervey Simpson
- Architectural style: earth road
- MPS: Minnesota Military Roads, 1850–1857
- NRHP reference No.: 90002200
- Added to NRHP: 1991-02-07

Wild River State Park is a state park of Minnesota, United States, curving along 18 miles (29 km) of the St. Croix River. This long, narrow park is shaped somewhat like a sideways 'S', with development largely concentrated in the lower third. The remote upper sections flank the mouth of a tributary called the Sunrise River. The park is managed to provide quieter, more nature-oriented recreation as a counterpoint to the busier William O'Brien and Interstate State Parks downstream.

Wild River State Park is named after the St. Croix's designation as a National Wild and Scenic River. The park contains the Point Douglas to Superior Military Road: Deer Creek Section, a surviving section of the Point Douglas to Superior Military Road built in 1853, which is listed on the National Register of Historic Places.

== Natural history ==
=== Geology ===
The bedrock of the park is basalt formed by volcanic activity 1.1 billion years ago. This is overlain by a thick layer of glacial debris. During the Wisconsin glaciation 16,000 years ago, a small glacial lobe branched northeast off the Des Moines Lobe, blocking drainage from farther north. Water backed up into Glacial Lake Grantsburg. The soil in the park is quite sandy from the sediments that accumulated in this now-vanished lake. At the end of this ice age 10,000 years ago, meltwater flowing out of Glacial Lake Duluth carved the St. Croix River Valley. Today the river is one hundred times smaller than its glacial maximum. The ancient bank of the river is a bluff running through the park, well back from the current riverbed.

=== Flora and fauna ===
This area was originally a transition zone between pine forest, hardwood forest, and oak savanna. These habitats were disrupted by logging and farming. Today the park is a mix of second-growth forest and meadow. As the river tends to overflow its banks in spring, inundation-tolerant species like silver maple and basswood dominate the floodplain. Wetlands are scattered throughout the park. Berries are prevalent along the trails, as are wild roses. Each month throughout spring and summer brings different wildflowers in bloom. Some common spring flowers include wild columbine (Aquilegia canadensis), wild geranium (Geranium maculatum), and Carolina puccoon (Lithospermum caroliniense). During the summer, visitors can see black-eyed Susan (Rudbeckia hirta), butterfly milkweed (Asclepias tuberosa), and rough blazing star (Liatris aspera). Fall brings its own mix of wildflowers, including many asters and goldenrods. There is also a variety of native grasses, including big bluestem (Andropogon gerardi), little bluestem (Schizachyrium scoparium), and Indian grass (Sorghastrum nutans).

Restoration is currently taking place through the park's Prairie Care Project, to rehabilitate oak savanna and prairie areas. These efforts involve controlled burning to reduce built-up thatch and clearing plantations of farmer-introduced pines. The Prairie Care Project allows and encourages volunteers to participate in seed collection in the fall and seed sowing in the spring.

Wild River State Park is also trying to reduce or eliminate the population of non-native, invasive buckthorn within park boundaries. The Buckthorn-Free Zone initiative allows volunteers to claim a portion, or "zone", of the park as their own with the responsibility of eventually making it buckthorn-free.

The park's narrowness reduces its quality as wildlife habitat somewhat. Nevertheless, it serves as north–south continuous corridor along the St. Croix River, which is used as a migration route for many birds. Prevalent mammals include beaver, raccoon, river otter, fox, coyote, squirrel, mink, and white-tailed deer. Black bear sightings are on the rise, as well as Gray wolves. Ducks, herons, and bitterns frequent the wetlands. Wild River State Park's bird list documents 200 species that can be viewed at different times throughout the year.

== History ==
=== Early history ===
Archaeological remains have been found in the park dating back 5000 years, but the majority of artifacts date from 1200 to 500 years ago. A village site from this time has been identified near the mouth of the Sunrise River. A fur trading post was built on top of the ancient village site in 1847. Together with a post established nearby in 1850, these were the last trading posts in the St. Croix Valley, and only operated for a few years.

The townships of Sunrise and Amador, and the community of Almelund were founded in the 1850s. Land was also sold in the town of Nashua, which may have been a confidence trick; the town never existed except on paper and was in fact sited in a marsh.

=== Point Douglas to Superior Military Road ===
In the 1850s the federal government began building the Point Douglas to Superior Military Road. Although intended as a highway for troop movement, this route from Hastings, Minnesota to Superior, Wisconsin was one of the first roads in the territory and attracted a flood of civilian and commercial traffic. When Minnesota achieved statehood in 1858, responsibility for the road devolved to the state, which did not have the funds to finish the project. Although very rough and in places incomplete, the road was still the best route north until railroads were built in 1870. A 1.2-mile (1.9 km) segment was still in evidence when Wild River State Park was established and was incorporated into the park's trail system. The road segment begins in a clearing just south of Deer Creek and forms the eastern leg of the Deer Creek Loop trail along the St. Croix River. Where the hiking trail veers away to loop back north, the road fragment continues as a maintenance access road for 2,500 feet (760 m) to the southeastern corner of the park boundary. Traces of the Point Douglas to Superior Military Road can also be seen in Minnesota's Banning State Park.

=== Logging era and Nevers Dam ===
Following an 1837 treaty with the Ojibwe, territory including the park was opened up to logging. The primary target was the massive Eastern White Pine, which could grow up to 200 feet (60 m) tall. Timber felled here and farther north was floated down the St. Croix River to sawmills in Stillwater. The lumber industry was bedeviled by massive log jams in 1867, 1877, 1883, and 1886. The 1883 jam, at Angle Rock in what is now Interstate Park, was the world's biggest log jam and took 57 days to break, during which the sawmill in Marine on St. Croix went out of business. To alleviate the problem, the Nevers Dam was built here in 1889–90 to control the flow of logs downstream. The dam created a 10-mile (16 km) lake in which logs could be safely massed. Gates were opened at two-week intervals to send a steady supply of lumber to Stillwater. The biweekly batch of logs could be up to a mile and a half long. A 600-foot-long (180 m) earthen dike, still visible, was built back from the dam to prevent the reservoir from overflowing. The park's usable timber was gone by 1902, and the following year Northern States Power (NSP) bought the dam to control the river's flow while they built a hydroelectric dam at St. Croix Falls. Log drives from farther upriver continued occasionally until 1912. In the 1940s public sentiment turned against the dam because of its impacts on recreation and conservation. The sluicegates began to be left open each summer. Severe floodwaters in 1954 left Nevers Dam structurally unsafe, and NSP removed it the following year.

=== Park acquisition ===
In addition to Nevers Dam, Northern States Power had acquired much of the land on either side of the river. With the St. Croix Falls Dam completed in 1907, NSP had little further need for this property 11 miles (18 km) upstream. They discussed contributing the land to the state as early as the 1930s. However it was the creation of the Saint Croix National Scenic Riverway in 1968 that finally prompted action by both parties. The main objection to the trade had always been that Chisago County would lose a sizeable amount of property tax income. Bills died twice in the Minnesota Legislature until the state park was finally authorized in 1973. As a compromise the state agreed to pay the county a declining percentage of the lost tax revenue for 10 years. NSP donated 4,497 acres (1,820 ha) and the value was matched by federal funds to buy land from other owners. The Nature Conservancy also assisted in acquiring property. Development began in 1976 and the park opened two years later. Originally called St. Croix Wild River State Park, the name was shortened to avoid confusion with St. Croix State Park.

== Recreation ==
Wild River State Park offers a variety of overnight options. The main campground boasts 94 drive-in sites—34 of which have electrical hookups—along with six camper cabins, showers, and flush toilets. A rustic horse campground contains 20 sites—15 of which have electricity—but no showers. A tent-only primitive group camp with vault toilets accommodates up to 18 people each in nine sites. Scattered throughout the park are seven backpacking campsites and four canoe campsites along the St. Croix River. The park has six camping cabins which include bunkbeds, a table, and benches. The park also operates a rental guesthouse featuring two bedrooms, one bathroom, and a full kitchen.

The park boasts 35 miles (56 km) of hiking trails. Of that total, 18 miles (29 km) are open to horseback riding, while a 2.6-mile (4.2 km) paved trail connecting the park's main facilities is suitable for bicycles, in-line skates, and wheelchairs. There are two 1-mile (1.6 km) interpretive trails. A year-round trail shelter offers modern restrooms and doubles as a rental facility. In winter 30 miles (48 km) of trail are groomed for cross-country skiing and skate skiing, and 6 miles (9.7 km) are groomed for snowshoeing. Snowshoers can also travel anywhere in the park as long as they stay off the ski trails. The trail center functions as a warming shelter in winter, and offers ski and snowshoe rentals.

The McElroy Interpretive Center hosts exhibits and naturalist programs year-round. Evening events are conducted at the amphitheater adjacent to the campground.

The St. Croix River is popular for canoeing. A concessionaire based inside the park rents canoes hourly and daily, and provides shuttle service back from take-out points. There are boat ramps in the main part of park and at the Sunrise access. Jet skis are prohibited on this section of the river. Anglers fish the river for smallmouth bass, northern pike, walleye, and catfish.

== Climate ==
Climate data for Wild River State Park, Minnesota (1991–2020 normals, extremes 1990–present)
Month	Jan	Feb	Mar	Apr	May	Jun	Jul	Aug	Sep	Oct	Nov	Dec	Year
Record high °F (°C)	53 (12)	61 (16)	83 (28)	88 (31)	96 (36)	102 (39)	99 (37)	100 (38)	97 (36)	89 (32)	74 (23)	60 (16)	102 (39)
Mean daily maximum °F (°C)	22.3 (−5.4)	27.3 (−2.6)	40.4 (4.7)	55.3 (12.9)	68.5 (20.3)	77.6 (25.3)	82.1 (27.8)	79.9 (26.6)	71.6 (22.0)	57.3 (14.1)	40.7 (4.8)	27.4 (−2.6)	54.2 (12.3)
Daily mean °F (°C)	11.1 (−11.6)	15.4 (−9.2)	28.9 (−1.7)	42.7 (5.9)	55.5 (13.1)	65.0 (18.3)	69.8 (21.0)	67.5 (19.7)	59.2 (15.1)	45.6 (7.6)	31.2 (−0.4)	17.9 (−7.8)	42.5 (5.8)
Mean daily minimum °F (°C)	−0.1 (−17.8)	3.5 (−15.8)	17.4 (−8.1)	30.0 (−1.1)	42.5 (5.8)	52.4 (11.3)	57.6 (14.2)	55.2 (12.9)	46.9 (8.3)	33.9 (1.1)	21.7 (−5.7)	8.4 (−13.1)	30.8 (−0.7)
Record low °F (°C)	−44 (−42)	−46 (−43)	−27 (−33)	0 (−18)	15 (−9)	29 (−2)	39 (4)	33 (1)	23 (−5)	9 (−13)	−23 (−31)	−38 (−39)	−46 (−43)
Average precipitation inches (mm)	0.83 (21)	1.01 (26)	1.55 (39)	2.98 (76)	4.02 (102)	4.19 (106)	4.22 (107)	4.01 (102)	3.48 (88)	3.21 (82)	1.62 (41)	1.27 (32)	32.39 (823)
Average precipitation days (≥ 0.01 in)	6.2	4.9	6.5	9.0	11.9	12.5	11.0	9.9	10.1	9.4	6.1	7.2	104.7
Source: NOAA
