= Wanuskewin Heritage Park =

Cultural and historical centre of First Nations near Saskatoon, Saskatchewan

Coordinates: 52°13′25″N 106°35′42″W

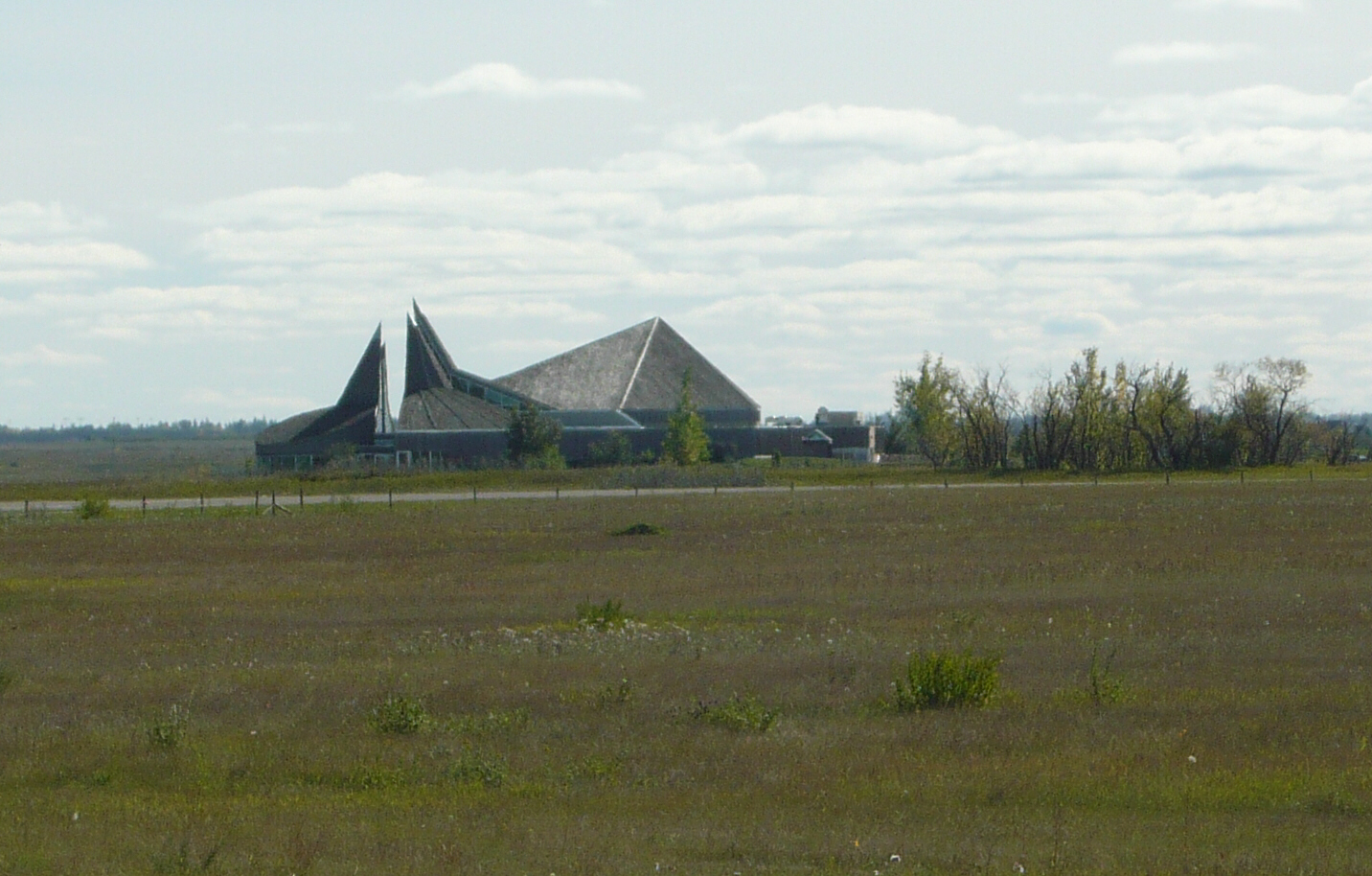
- Wanuskewin Heritage Park
- Interactive map of Wanuskewin Heritage Park
- Location: Corman Park No. 344, near Saskatoon, Saskatchewan
- Created: June 27, 1992
- Operator: Wanuskewin Indian Heritage Incorporated; Wanuskewin Heritage Park Authority
- Website: https://wanuskewin.com/

National Historic Site of Canada
- Official name: Wanuskewin National Historic Site of Canada
- Designated: 1986

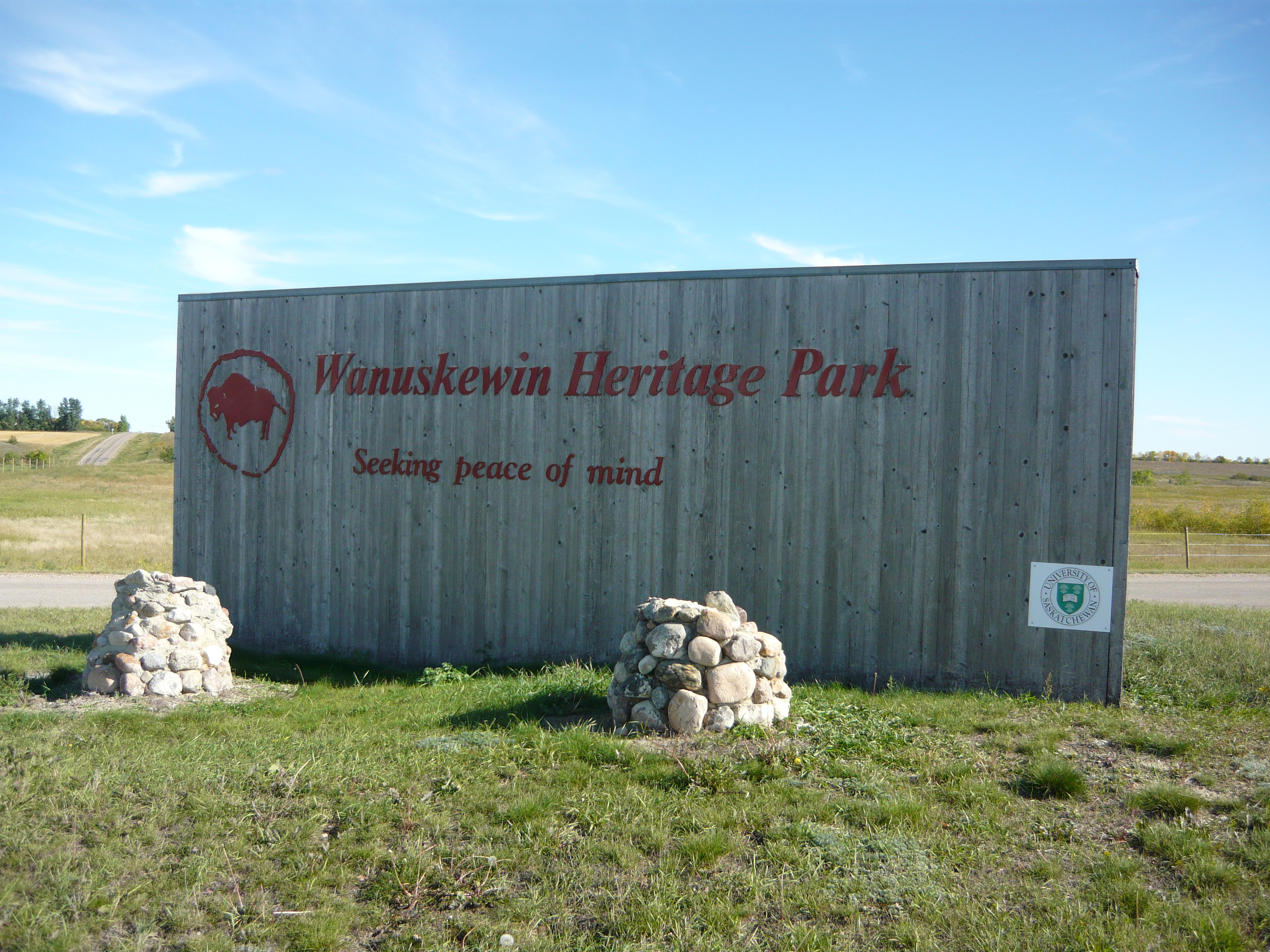

Wanuskewin Heritage Park is an archaeological site and non-profit cultural and historical centre of the First Nations just outside the city of Saskatoon, Saskatchewan. The faculty's name comes from the Cree language word ᐋᐧᓇᐢᑫᐃᐧᐣ or wânaskêwin, meaning, "being at peace with oneself". The site is a National Historic Site of Canada due to the importance of its archaeological resources representing nearly 6,000 years of the history of the Northern Plains peoples. In 2016, it was announced that Wanuskewin intends to seek UNESCO World Heritage designation, which would make it the first World Heritage Site in Saskatchewan.

== Background ==
The Saskatchewan Wanuskewin Indian Heritage Incorporated (WIHI) organization was established to present the interests of regional First Nations in planning the park. The Wanuskewin Heritage Park Authority (WHPA) is a 12-member organization responsible for the operation of the park. The WHPA board has representation from the First Nations community, Government of Canada, Province of Saskatchewan, City of Saskatoon, University of Saskatchewan, Meewasin Valley Authority, and the Friends of Wanuskewin.

For more than 6,000 years people have gathered at this place. The migratory nations who roamed the Northern Plains came to hunt bison, gather food and herbs, and to find shelter from the winter winds. Some of the sites uncovered date back thousands of years. Wanuskewin is also the site of an arrangement of boulders called a medicine wheel, of which fewer than 100 remain on the northern plains.

Wanuskewin Heritage Park is located near the west bank of the South Saskatchewan River on Opimihaw Creek, just three kilometres (1.9 mi) north of Saskatoon. Within its 240 hectares (590 acres), there are 19 sites that represent the active and historical society of Northern Plains Peoples composed of Cree, Assiniboine, Saulteaux, Atsina, Dakota, and Blackfoot. On site there are summer and winter camp sites, bison kill sites, tipi rings, and artifacts such as pottery fragments, plant seeds, projectile points, egg shells and animal bones, all within a compact area.

Wanuskewin Heritage Park officially opened in June 1992. Scientific investigations in the area began in the early 1930s with the University of Saskatchewan now managing an archaeological research program at Wanuskewin with active archaeological digs. The Park was designated a Provincial Heritage Property in 1984, the only such site in Saskatchewan featuring prehistoric artifacts. It was named a National Historic Site in 1986. The following year Queen Elizabeth II unveiled a dedication plaque. In 2001, King Charles III, then Prince of Wales, was named Pisimwa Kamiwohkitahpamikohk, meaning "the sun looks at him in a good way", by an elder in a ceremony at Wanuskewin.

Wanuskewin's mission is to operate, on a sustainable basis, a Heritage Park under the leadership and guidance of First Nations people that contributes to increasing public awareness, understanding and appreciation of the cultural legacy of the Northern Plains First Nations people.

During the peak summer season about 40–45 people are employed at the park. The place serves as:

- A tourist attraction
- Human resource development agency
- Scientific, cultural and educational authority
- Gathering place for present day spiritual uses such sweats, pipe ceremonies, and more

== Wildlife ==
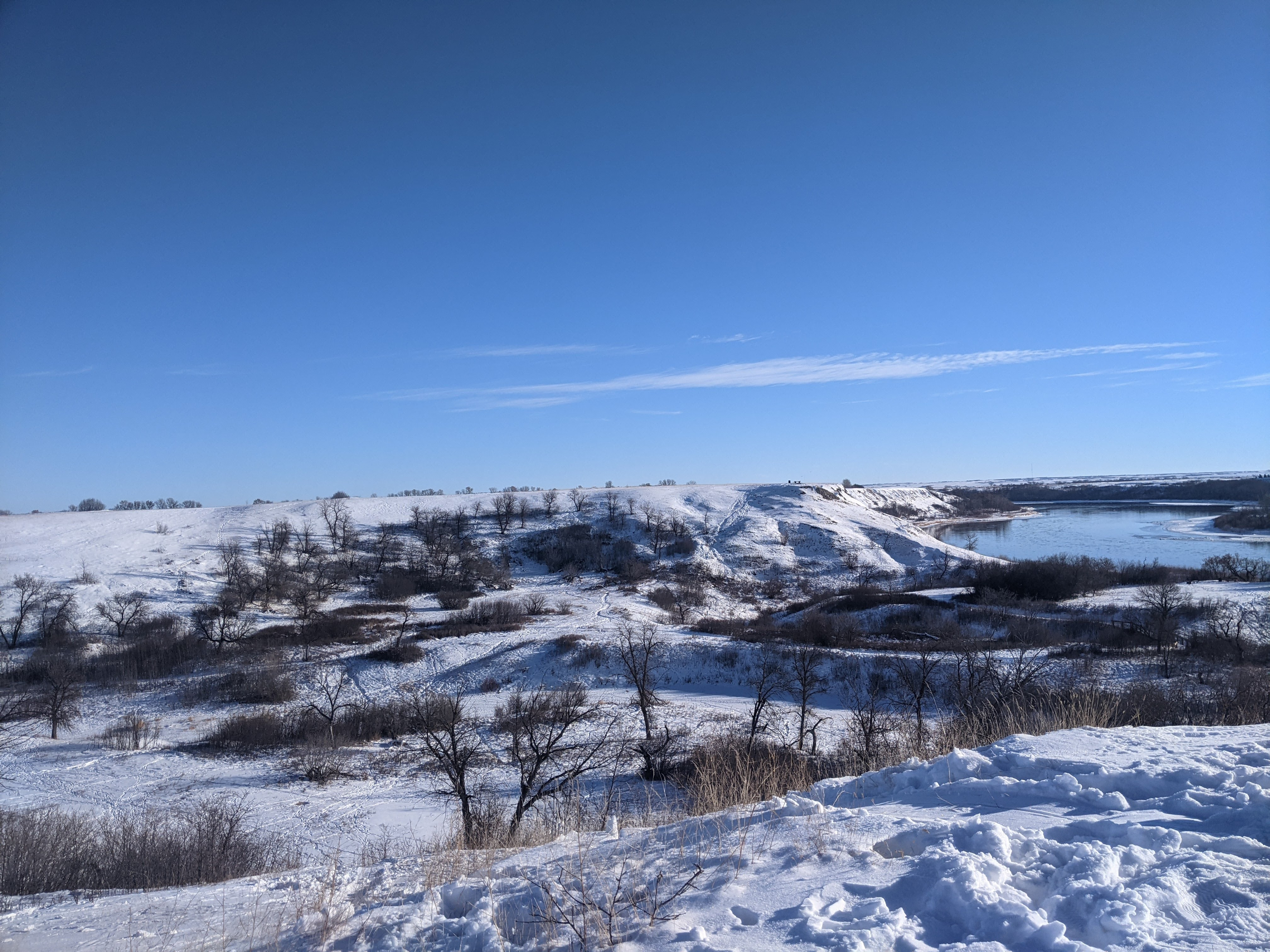
View from the high point of Wanuskewin Heritage Park

A herd of plains bison were reintroduced to this historic bison hunting ground for numerous Indigenous groups in December 2019 when six calves were brought from Grasslands National Park. Later that month, one bull and four pregnant cows travelled from South Dakota. The bull comes from a wild herd in Yellowstone National Park. The herd grew by one on 22 April 2021 when for the first time a calf was born on the territory since 1876. On 12 September 2021, a male calf was born; bringing the total number of bison at Wanuskewin to 18. The herd is expected to grow to 50 animals.

== Opimihaw Creek ==
Opimihaw Creek
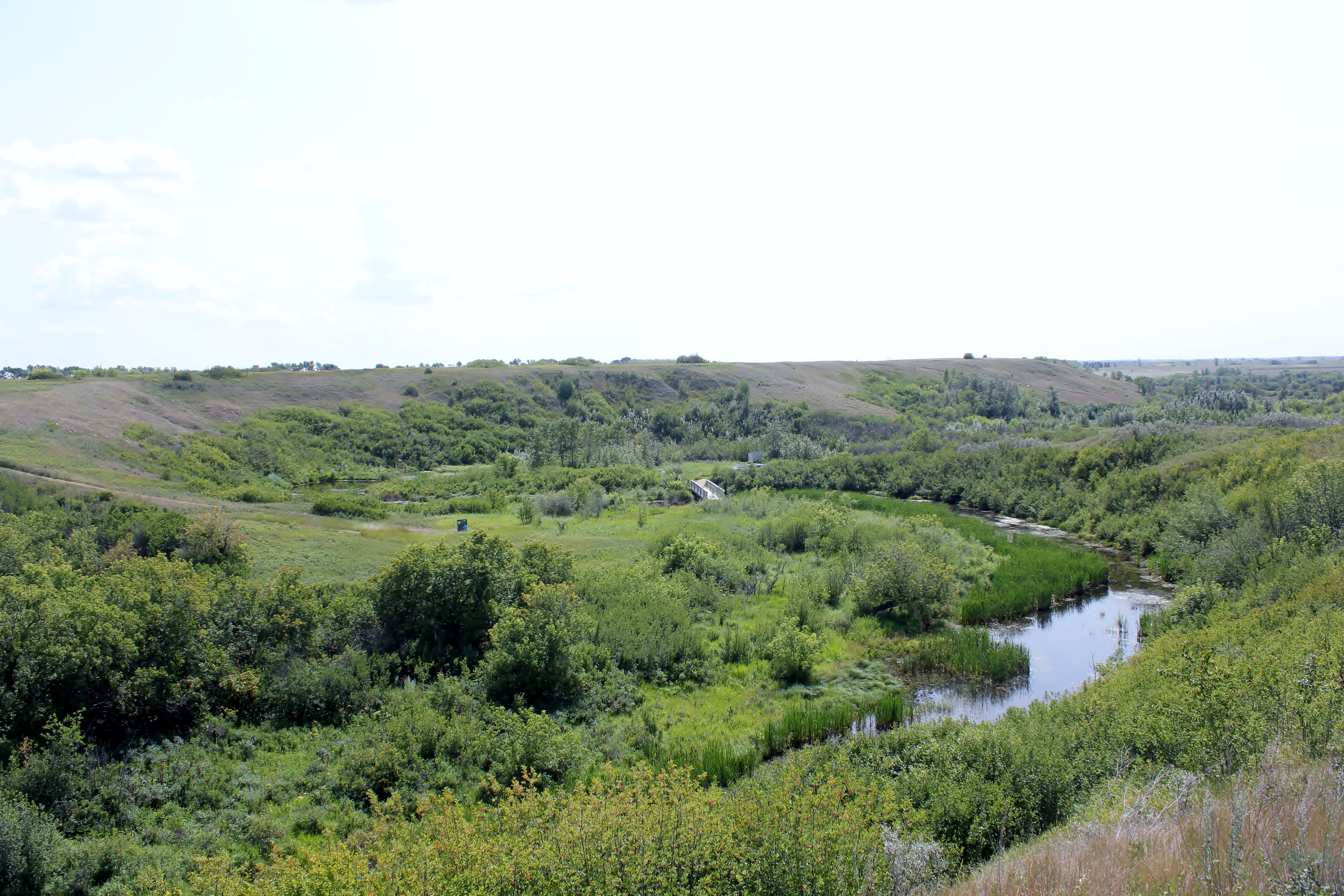
- Opimihaw Creek seen from outside the Wanuskewin complex
- Etymology: From Plains Cree 'opimihaw' meaning 'one which is swift/quick'

Location
- Province: Saskatchewan

Basin features
- River system: Saskatchewan River
- Landmarks: Wanuskewin Heritage Park

Opimihaw Creek is a small creek in the park that flows into the South Saskatchewan River. The name comes from the Plains Cree word ᐅᐱᒥᐦᐋᐤ opimihâw (/opɪmɪhɑː/) meaning 'pilot' or literally 'one which is swift'. The creek has a long and historic connection with Plains Indian peoples and their cultures.

=== Valley ===
Opimihaw Creek is notable for its valley, which carves into the river bank and is filled by wetland and various fauna. Many First Nations people historically used the valley as a buffalo jump, and so it is a notable site for archaeology. There are around 20 dig sites situated around the creek in the park; some of the dig sites date back as far as 6,400 years, predating the Pyramids of Giza in Egypt.

== See also ==
- List of National Historic Sites of Canada in Saskatchewan
- List of protected areas of Saskatchewan
