= St. Croix River (Wisconsin–Minnesota) =

River in Wisconsin and Minnesota, United States

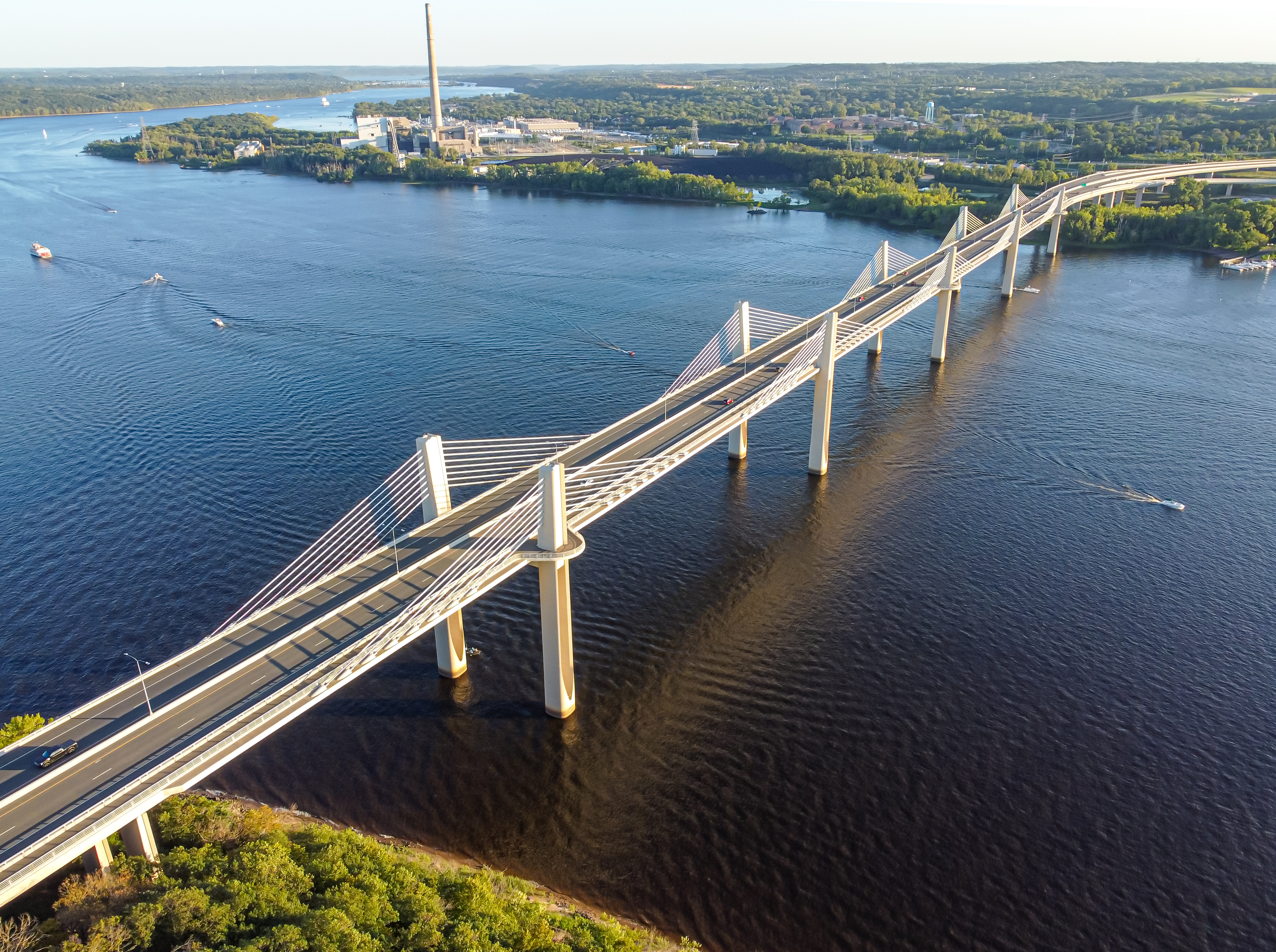
- St. Croix River at the St. Croix Crossing

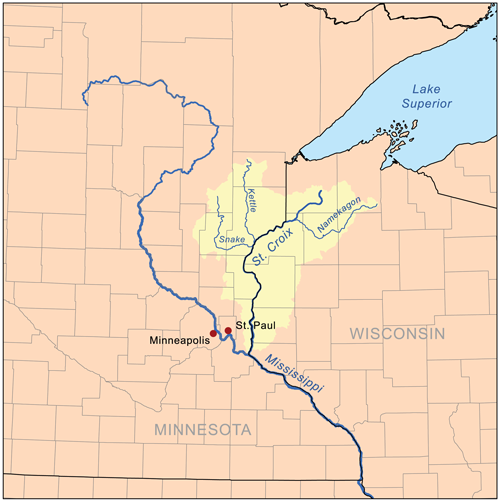
- Map of the St. Croix watershed.
- Native name: Hoġan Wanḳe Kin (Dakota); Gichi-ziibi (Ojibwe)

Location
- Country: United States
- State: Wisconsin, Minnesota
- Cities: St. Croix Falls, WI, Taylors Falls, MN, Osceola, WI, Stillwater, MN, Hudson, WI, Afton, MN, Prescott, WI, Lindström, MN, Marine on St. Croix, MN, Somerset, WI, Scandia, MN River Falls, WI

Physical characteristics
- Source: Upper St. Croix Lake
  - location: near Solon Springs, Wisconsin, Douglas County, WI
  - coordinates: 46°23′19″N 91°45′34″W
- Mouth: Mississippi River
  - location: Prescott, WI, Pierce County, Washington, Dakota, MN, WI
  - coordinates: 44°44′44″N 92°48′10″W
- Length: 169 mi (272 km)
- Basin size: 7,700 sq mi (20,000 km^{2})
- Discharge
  - location: Prescott, WI
  - average: 6,374 cu ft/s (180.5 m^{3}/s).

Basin features
- Tributaries
  - left: Apple River, Yellow River, Namekagon River, Eau Claire River, Kinnickinnic River, Willow River (St. Croix River)
  - right: Sunrise River, Snake River, Kettle River, Trout Brook

National Wild and Scenic River
- Type: Scenic, Recreational
- Designated: October 2, 1968
- Part of: Saint Croix National Scenic Riverway

The St. Croix River (/ˈkrɔɪ/ KROY; French for 'Holy Cross'), also known in Dakota as Hoġan Wanḳe Kin, is a tributary of the Mississippi River, about 169 mi (272 km) long, in the U.S. states of Wisconsin and Minnesota. The lower 125 mi (201 km) of the river form the border between Wisconsin and Minnesota. The river is a National Scenic Riverway under the protection of the National Park Service. A hydroelectric plant at the Saint Croix Falls Dam supplies power to the Minneapolis–Saint Paul metropolitan area.

== Geography and hydrography ==
The St. Croix River rises in the northwestern corner of Wisconsin, out of Upper St. Croix Lake in Douglas County, near Solon Springs, approximately 20 miles (32 km) south of Lake Superior. It flows south to Gordon, then southwest. It is joined by the Namekagon River in northern Burnett County, where it becomes significantly wider. A few miles downstream the St. Croix meets the boundary between Minnesota and Wisconsin, which it demarcates for another 130 miles (209 km) until its confluence with the Mississippi River.

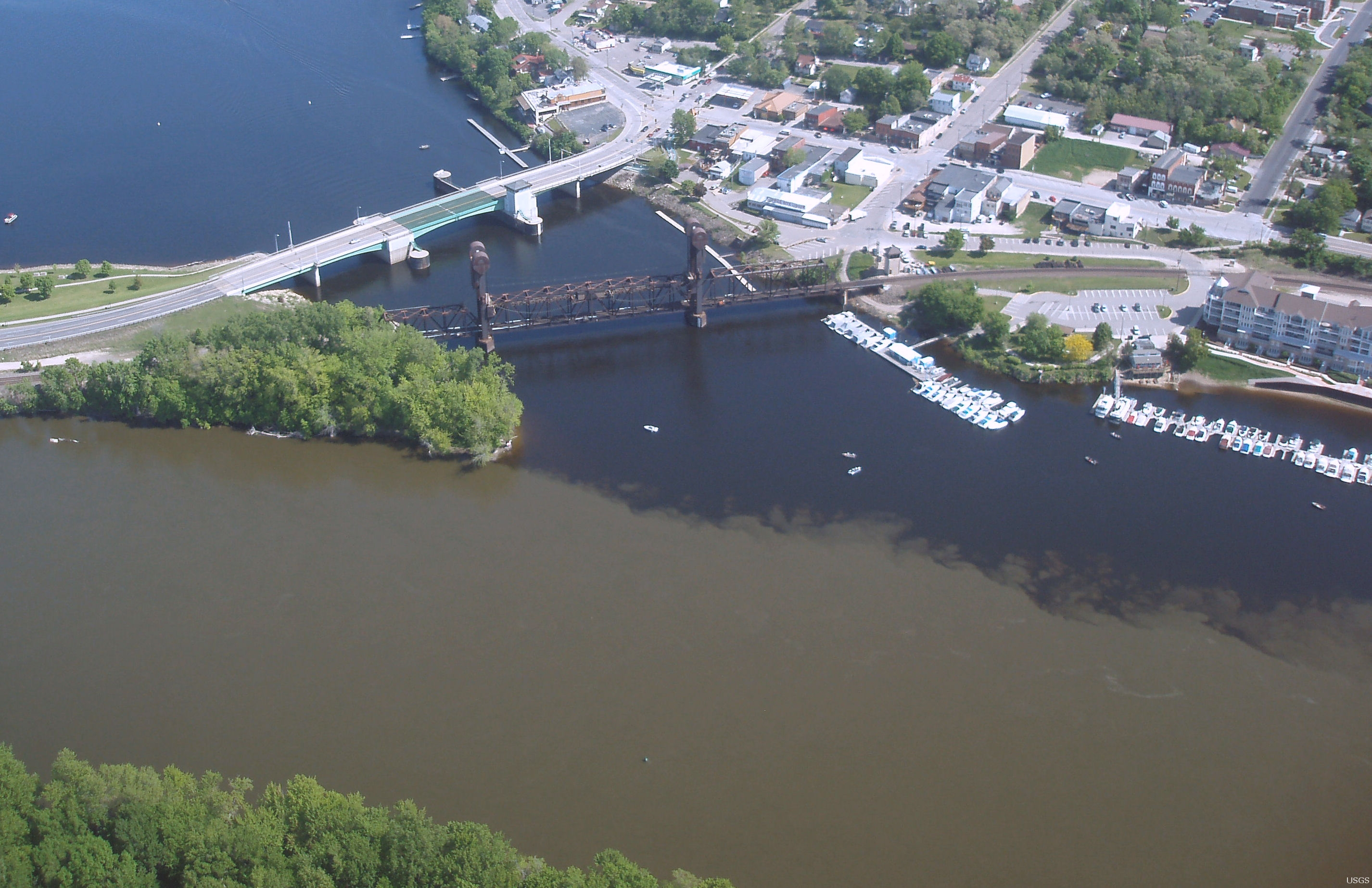
Aerial photo near Prescott, Wisconsin, where the clearer waters of the St. Croix meet the muddier Mississippi River.

Other major tributaries include the Kettle River, Snake River, and Sunrise River joining from the west, and the Apple River, Willow River, and Kinnickinnic River joining from the east. Just below Stillwater, Minnesota the river widens into Lake St. Croix, and eventually joins the Mississippi River at Prescott, Wisconsin, approximately 20 miles (32 km) southeast of St. Paul, Minnesota.

=== Geomorphology ===
The presence of older glacial deposits within the St. Croix River basin proves that the Laurentide Ice Sheet has repeatedly glaciated this region during the Pleistocene Epoch. Within this region these older deposits consist of gray calcareous tills associated with glaciofluvial yellowish-brown sand and gravel and glacial lacustrine silts and clays of the Pierce Formation and overlying reddish-brown tills and associated sand and gravel of the River Falls Formation. Any glacial landforms associated with these earlier glacial deposits have been destroyed by erosion. These earlier deposits occur as erosional remnants either capping hills or buried by the latest advance of the Laurentide Ice Sheet over this area during the Last Glacial Maximum.

The drainage basin of the St. Croix River last deglaciated between about 19,000 and 14,000 BP calibrated (16,000 and 12,000 ^{14}C uncalibrated). During this time, the Superior Lobe retreated from the maximum extent of the Superior Lobe at the Emerald moraine northeastward to Thompson and Nicherson moraine complex at the edge of the Lake Superior basin. During the retreat of the Superior Lobe, a blanket of reddish-brown tills containing beds of fine sand and silt was left behind by the melting of the retreating ice sheet. During glacial retreat, meltwater drainage from the intermediate St.Croix moraine established the precursor to the St. Croix River.

The retreat of the Superior lobe into the Lake Superior basin created small, proglacial lakes. Later, these lakes coalesced to form a large proglacial lake called proglacial Lake Duluth, within the western Superior basin. The multiple lake levels of proglacial Lake Duluth included the Duluth level and an older and smaller epi-Duluth level. At first, glacial meltwater drained from the epi-Duluth level and a smaller precursor proglacial lake, named Lake Nemadji through the Moose Lake (Portage) outlet into the Kettle River and into the St. Croix River. The flow of glacial meltwater from glacial Lake Nemadji and Lake epi-Duluth during the retreat of the Superior Lobe caused the rapid entrenchment of the St. Croix River and formation of a strath terrace, known as the Chengwatana surface. As the Superior Lobe retreated, the Duluth level was established when another outlet, the Brule outlet, opened and the Moose Lake outlet was abandoned. The opening of the Brule outlet allowed a massive and sudden outflow of glacial meltwater through the Brule outlet and down St. Croix River and excavation of a deep inner channel, which includes the Dalles, into the Chengwatana surface. This massive flow of meltwater also created the giant potholes of Interstate Park between 10,800 and 10,600 BP calibrated. The Brule outlet was abandoned when Lake Superior Lobe retreated from the Keweenaw Peninsula and opened lower eastward draining outlets. This caused the Duluth level to drop abruptly to post-Duluth levels and water to cease flowing into Brule outlet and down the St. Croix River. The cessation of water outflow through the Brule outlet disconnected the St. Croix River from the Lake Superior basin and created the northward flowing Bois Brule River.

== Conservation efforts ==
The St. Croix River was one of the original eight rivers to have significant portions placed under protection by the National Wild and Scenic Rivers Act of 1968. The upper reaches of the river in Wisconsin below the St. Croix Flowage, 15 miles (24 km) downstream from its source, as well as the Namekagon River, are protected as the St. Croix National Scenic Riverway. The free-flowing nature of the river is interrupted only by the hydroelectric Saint Croix Falls Dam at St. Croix Falls, Wisconsin.

The lower 27 miles (43 km) below the dam, including both sides of the river along the Minnesota-Wisconsin border, were protected as part of the Lower St. Croix National Scenic Riverway. This area includes the Dalles of the St. Croix River, a scenic gorge located near Interstate Park, south of St. Croix Falls, Wisconsin.

Although the addition of an interstate bridge connected to MN Highway 36 was objected to by residents, nearby communities, conservation groups, and the National Park Service, construction of the bridge was authorized by amending the Wild and Scenic Rivers Act of 1968. Light and noise pollution are concerns of those opposed to the bridge; the original act kept such activity to the south of the Interstate 94 corridor. The St. Croix Crossing bridge was ultimately completed in August 2017.

The Wild Rivers Conservancy of the St. Croix & Namekagon is a watershed-wide non-profit advocating for conservation throughout the watershed. Founded in 1911 as an all-volunteer citizens group, it has evolved into a staffed nonprofit organization and official friends-of society to the St. Croix National Scenic Riverway. Its mission is to inspire stewardship to forever ensure the rare ecological integrity of the St. Croix and Namekagon Riverway.

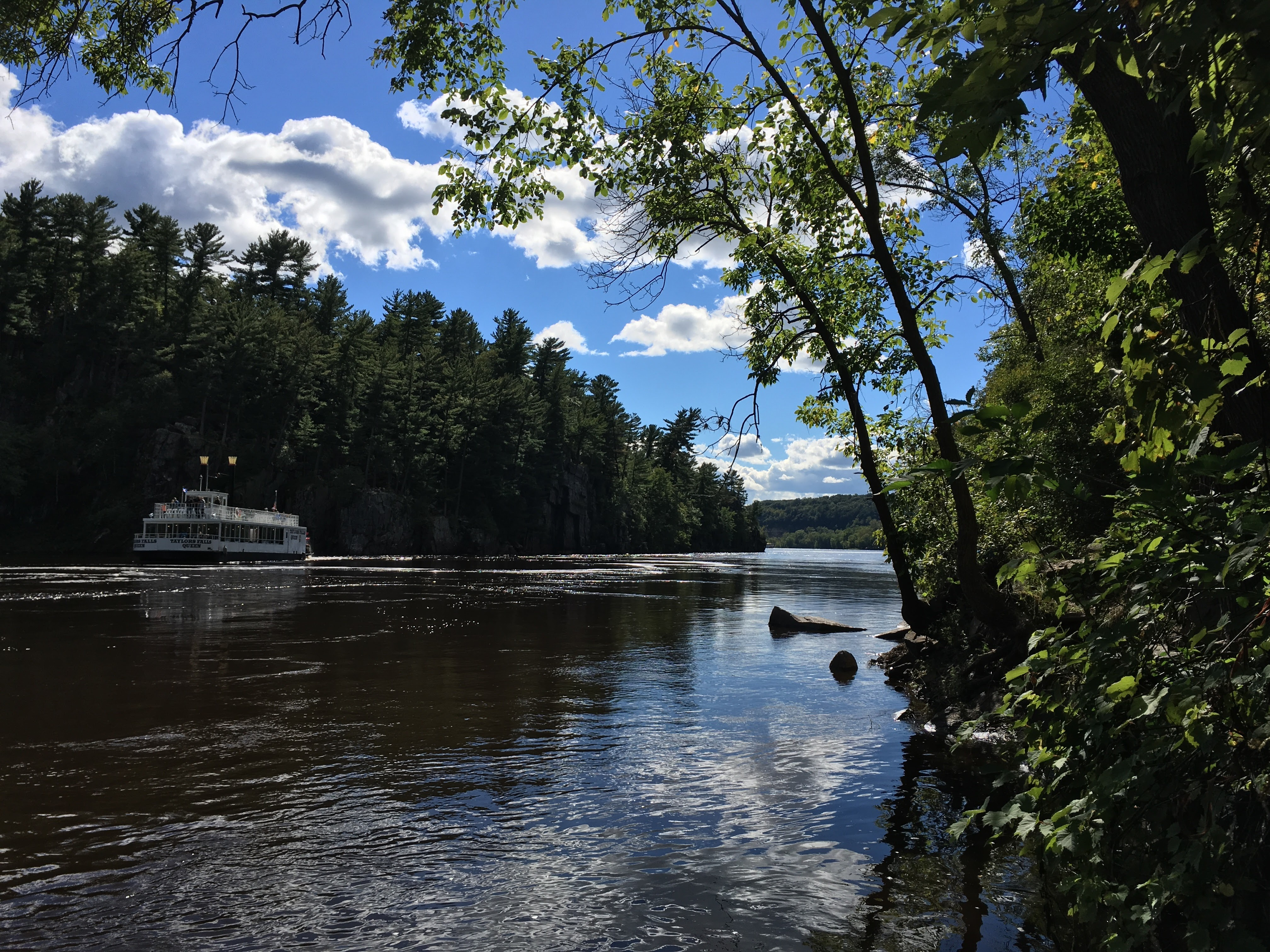
St Croix River, MN

== Naming ==
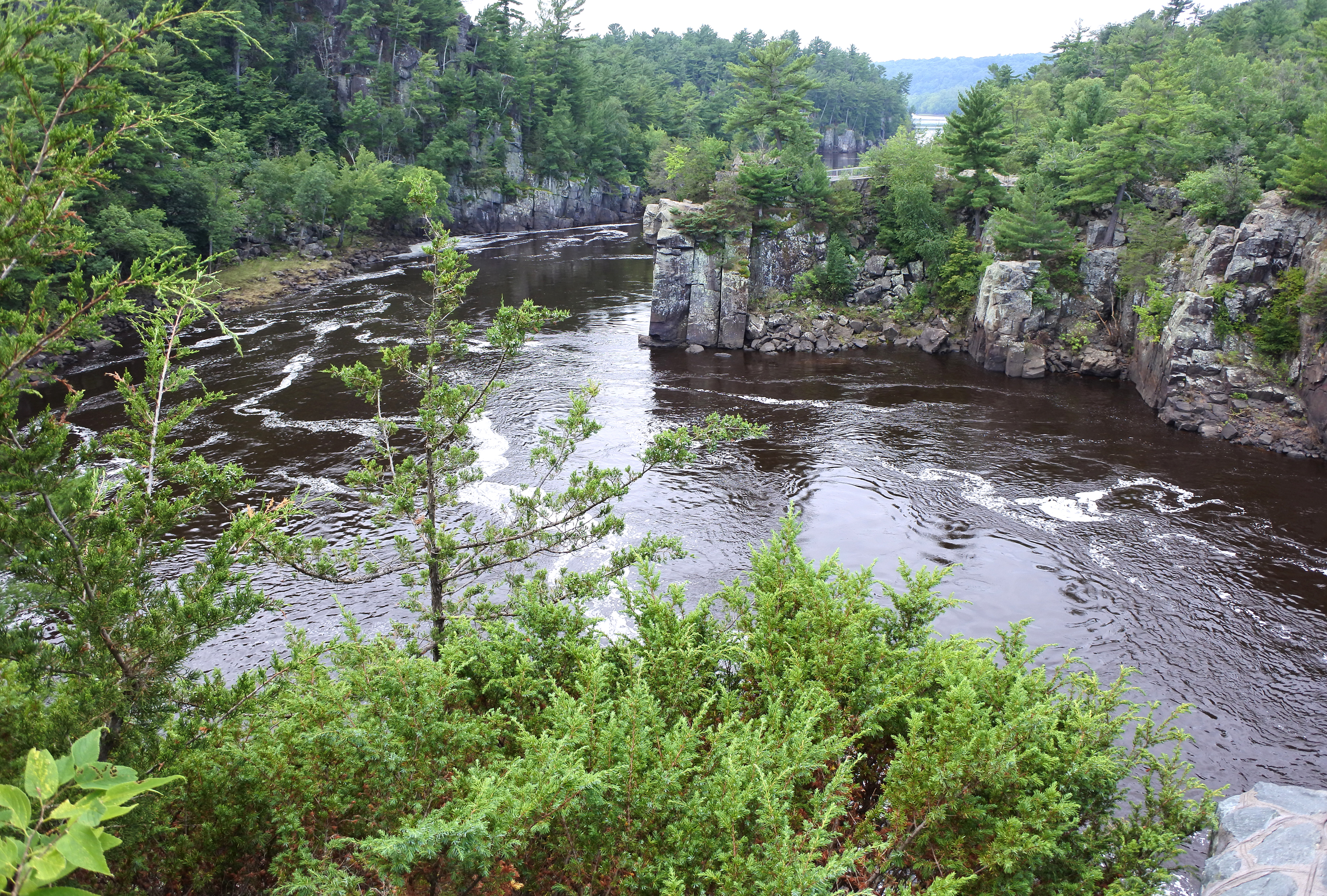
St. Croix River Dalles at Interstate State Park, Wisconsin.

Father Louis Hennepin wrote in 1683, from information probably provided by Daniel Greysolon, Sieur du Lhut: "There is another River which falls ... into the Meschasipi ... We named it The River of the Grave, or Mausoleum because the Savages buried there one of their Men ... who was bitten by a Rattlesnake." In the original French, this is translated as "Rivière Tombeaux".

Jean-Baptiste-Louis Franquelin's 1688 map recorded a "Fort St. Croix" on the upper reaches of the river. The name "Rivière de Sainte-Croix" was applied to the river sometime in 1688 or 1689, and this more auspicious name supplanted Father Hennepin's earlier designation.

On Carte de la Louisiane et du Cours du Mississipi (1718) by Guillaume Delisle and on A Map of North America (1768) by John Blair, the St. Croix River—more specifically what was then known as the east branch of the St. Croix River (known today as the Namekagon River)—is shown as the Ouasisacadeba, a French representation of the Dakota name for the St. Croix River. On the 1778 Mitchell Map, the river is simply titled "Ouadeba", which represents the Dakota watpá meaning "river".

The upper portion of the river—originally called the north branch of the St. Croix River—was known to the Ojibwa as Manoominikeshiinh-ziibi (Ricing-Rail River). Downstream of its confluence with the Namekagon, the Ojibwa renamed the river as Gichi-ziibi (Big River) or Okijii-ziibi (Pipestem River)

At the time of the European settlement of the valley, Dakota and Ojibwe were engaged in a long and deadly war with each other. Consequently, the portion of the river below the confluence with Trade River is called Jiibayaatig-ziibi (Grave-marker River) in the Ojibwe language, reinforcing the earlier "Rivière Tombeaux" name in their language.

On Map of the Territories of Michigan and Ouisconsin (1830) by John Farmer, the St. Croix River is shown as the "Chippewa River". However, by 1843, Joseph Nicollet's Hydrographical Basin of the Upper Mississippi River reinforced the name provided by Franquelin's 1688 map.

== History ==
Stereoscopic view of the St. Croix River valley upstream from Stillwater, Minnesota.

The river is the result of geologic forces going back 1.1 billion years. At that time, the Mid-Continent Rift rendered the middle of North America apart, creating a volcanic zone. The lava spewed forth cooled into hard basalt. That basalt is what today creates the dramatic cliffs around the Interstate State Parks. About 500 million years ago, a shallow sea covered the area, laying down layers of sand and minerals that make up much of the sandstone bluffs now seen along the river. In the last 20,000 years, glaciers have scraped the landscape and released torrents of meltwater, which carved the St. Croix River's course.

The river has been home to people for thousands of years. A bison kill site in May Township, Washington County, Minnesota is believed to be about 4,000 years old. An Oneota village from about 1200 A.D. has been studied by archaeologists.

At the time of European arrival in the region, the river valley and the surrounding area was occupied by the semi-nomadic Ojibwe, Dakota and nine other American Indian tribes. The Indians lived mainly on wild rice, fish, and game. By the 18th century, the Ojibwe and Dakota were the two primary tribes that inhabited the area, until around 1745, when the Dakota have driven out from the St. Croix Valley as a result of the Battle of Kathio.

=== Fur trade ===
The first Europeans to arrive in the area were Sieur du Lhut and his men in the fall and winter of 1679–1680. For the next eighty years, the area was primarily under French influence, and the fur trade grew throughout the first half of the 18th century, with beaver pelts as the prize trade good. French trade in the upper valley was dominated by the Ojibwe and tied to Lake Superior traders, whereas in the lower valley the Dakota assisted in trading with merchants based out of St. Louis downstream. After the end of the French and Indian War in 1763, British traders entered the area and grew in numbers and influence with the help of the powerful North West Company.

=== Logging ===
The 1837 Treaty of St. Peters with the Ojibwe was signed at St. Peters (now Mendota) which ceded to the United States government a vast tract of land in what today is north central Wisconsin and central Minnesota, roughly bounded by the Prairie du Chien Line in the south, Mississippi River in the west, St. Croix and Chippewa River watersheds in the north, and a 25-mile parallel east of the Wisconsin River in the east. This opened the region to logging. The river was important to the transportation of lumber downstream, from the areas where it was being cut to the sawmills that processed it. During the 1840s, important sawmills were located at St. Croix Falls and Marine on St. Croix, but as the 1850s progressed Stillwater became the primary lumber destination. During this time the population of Stillwater boomed, several additional sawmills were opened, and the town saw an influx of capital, primarily from lumber companies based downriver in St. Louis, Missouri.

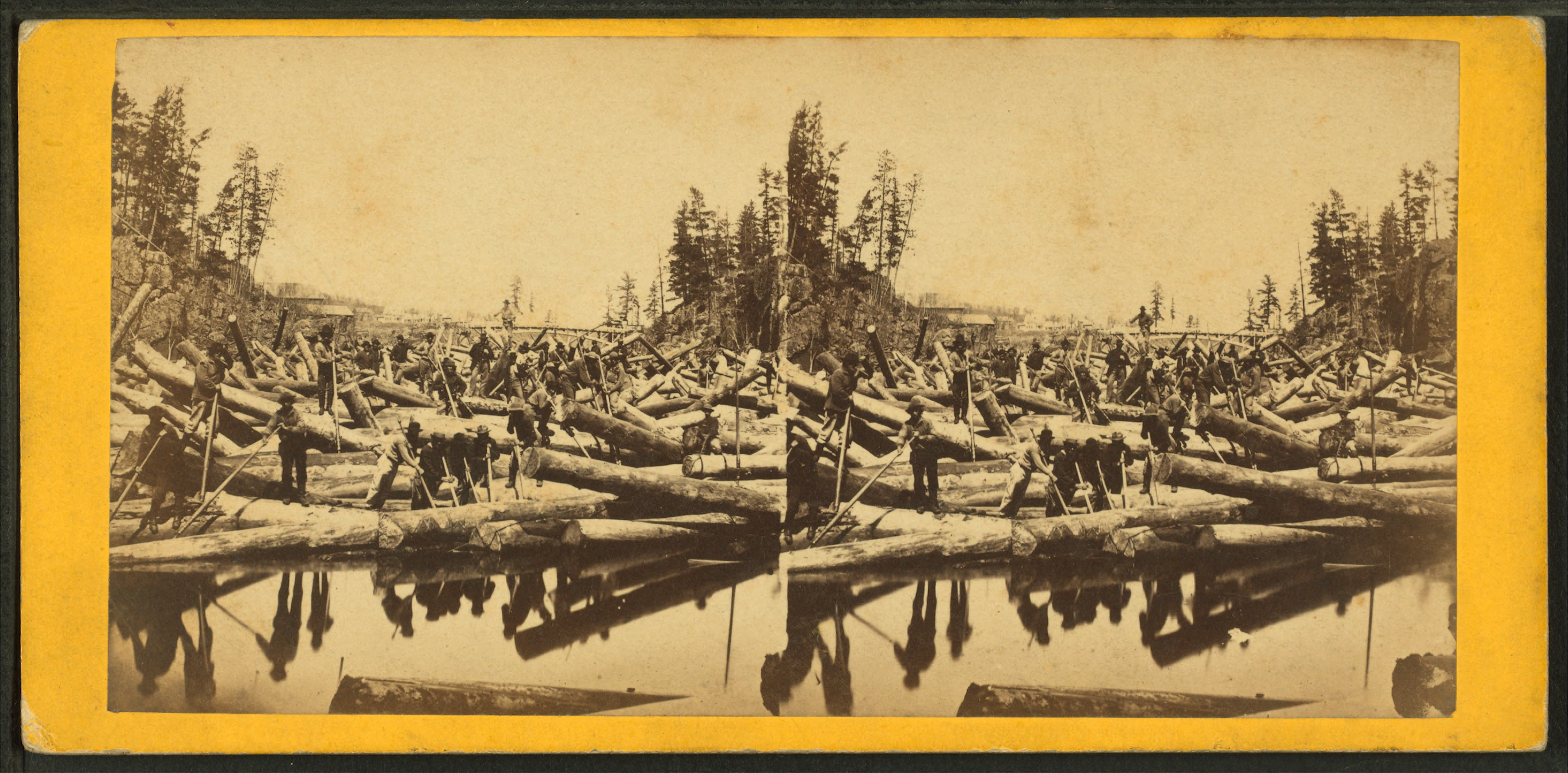
Stereoscopic photograph of logging along the St. Croix

In 1856 construction began on a booming site two miles north of Stillwater, which was used to store and sort the lumber floating downstream and remained in operation for over fifty years. The St. Croix Boom Site is now a wayside rest and National Historic Landmark along Minnesota State Highway 95.

The vast white pine forests in the upper valley provided the forest products that built the towns along with Lake St. Croix, Minneapolis, and St. Paul; the St. Croix along with the forest reserves in the river valleys of the nearby Red Cedar, Chippewa, and Rum provided supplies for the building of Winona, Minnesota, Davenport, Iowa, Rock Island, Illinois, and St. Louis.

The lumber industry continued to grow throughout the latter half of the 19th century, with progressively larger spring drives and consequent dangers to navigation on the river above Stillwater. Logs were frequently caught in log jams at the narrow Dalles of the St. Croix River, and in 1883 the blockade was so severe it took almost two months before the flow of logs was re-established. The 1886 jam, described as the "jammedest jam", required the use of steamboats and dynamite to clear. At its peak in 1890, logging in the St. Croix River valley produced 450,000,000 board feet (1,100,000 m^{3}) of lumber and logs. The lumber industry continued until the last major log drive in 1912 marked the end of the rich white pine forests of the area.

In the late 1800s and early 1900s, the St. Croix River competed with the St. Louis River as a candidate for a canal linking the Mississippi River with the Great Lakes. The US Army Corps of Engineers ultimately concluded in 1913 that such a canal would be "inadvisable, infeasible, and impractical".

It was along the banks of the St. Croix, in the milltown of Stillwater, that the state of Minnesota was first proposed in 1848.

== Cities and towns ==
- Afton, Minnesota
- Bayport, Minnesota
- Danbury, Wisconsin
- Gordon, Wisconsin
- Houlton, Wisconsin
- Hudson, Wisconsin
- Lake St. Croix Beach, Minnesota
- Lakeland, Minnesota
- Lakeland Shores, Minnesota
- Lindström, Minnesota
- Marine on St. Croix, Minnesota
- North Hudson, Wisconsin
- Oak Park Heights, Minnesota
- Osceola, Wisconsin
- Pine City, Minnesota
- Point Douglas, Minnesota
- Prescott, Wisconsin
- St. Croix Falls, Wisconsin
- St. Marys Point, Minnesota
- Scandia, Minnesota
- Solon Springs, Wisconsin
- Somerset, Wisconsin
- Stillwater, Minnesota
- Taylors Falls, Minnesota

== Bridge crossings ==
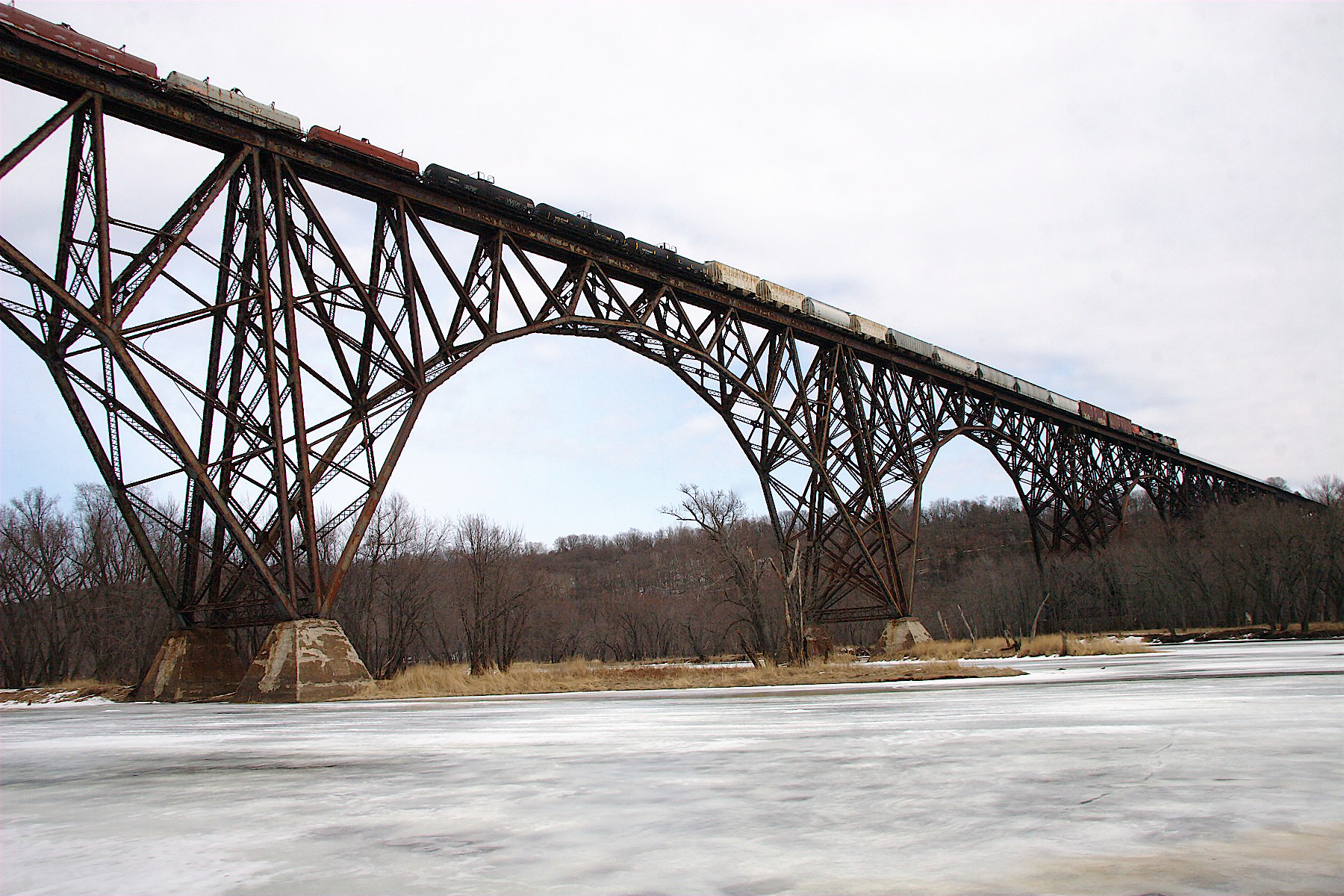
Train crossing the Soo Line High Bridge

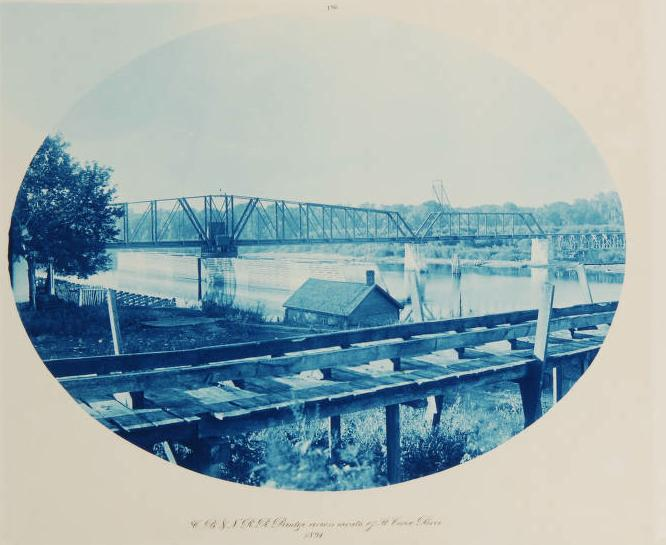
A crossing of the Chicago, Burlington and Quincy Railroad at the mouth of the St. Croix in 1891

Significant bridge crossings of the St. Croix River are listed below, ordered from source to mouth.

- Scott Bridge in Douglas County, Wisconsin.
- County Road T bridge in Douglas County, Wisconsin.
- C.C.C. Bridge in Burnett County, Wisconsin.
- Wisconsin State Highway 35 bridge near Danbury, Wisconsin.
- Minnesota State Highway 48 to Wisconsin State Highway 77 bridge near Danbury, Wisconsin.
- Minnesota State Highway 70 to Wisconsin State Highway 70 bridge near Grantsburg, Wisconsin.
- U.S. Highway 8 bridge between Taylors Falls, Minnesota and St. Croix Falls, Wisconsin.
- Minnesota State Highway 243 bridge at Osceola, Wisconsin.
- Soo Line High Bridge north of Stillwater, Minnesota. This private, rail-only bridge is 2,682 feet (817 m) long and 184 feet (56 m) above the river. It roughly marks the northern limit of zebra mussel infestation in the St. Croix.
- The Stillwater lift bridge, built 1931, between Stillwater, Minnesota and Houlton, Wisconsin.
- St. Croix Crossing bridge near Stillwater, Minnesota and Houlton, Wisconsin.
- Union Pacific Railroad swing bridge at Hudson, Wisconsin
- Interstate 94 bridge at Hudson, Wisconsin.
- Prescott Drawbridge (U.S. Highway 10) at Prescott, Wisconsin.
- BNSF Railway lift bridge at Prescott, Wisconsin.

== Commerce and recreation ==
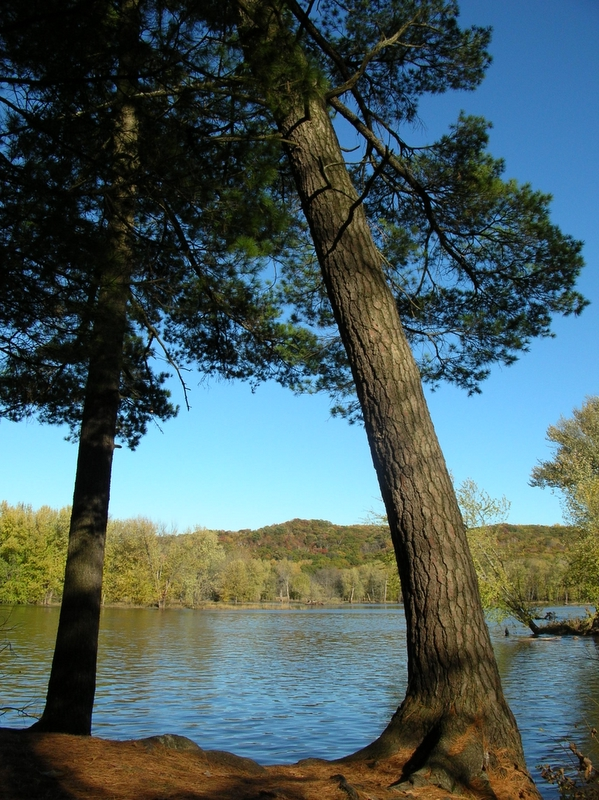
William O' Brien State Park

The St. Croix is a popular recreational river. Common uses include boating, fishing, camping and canoeing. Highways along both sides of the river offer scenic drives punctuated by small towns offering restaurants, shopping (especially antiques, books and gifts), bed and breakfasts, historical tours and other common tourist activities.

Public lands along the St. Croix River include:

- Governor Knowles State Forest (Wisconsin)
- Saint Croix State Forest (Minnesota)
- Saint Croix State Park (Minnesota)
- Chengwatana State Forest (Minnesota)
- Wild River State Park (Minnesota)
- Interstate Park (Minnesota and Wisconsin)
- William O'Brien State Park (Minnesota)
- Afton State Park (Minnesota)
- St. Croix Boom Site (Minnesota)

== See also ==
- List of rivers of Minnesota
- List of longest streams of Minnesota
- List of rivers of Wisconsin
- Citizens for the St. Croix Valley
