= Saint Croix Falls =

Saint Croix Falls may refer to:

- Saint Croix Falls, Wisconsin, a city in Polk County, Wisconsin, United States.
- The falls at Saint Croix Falls Dam
