= Interstate Park =

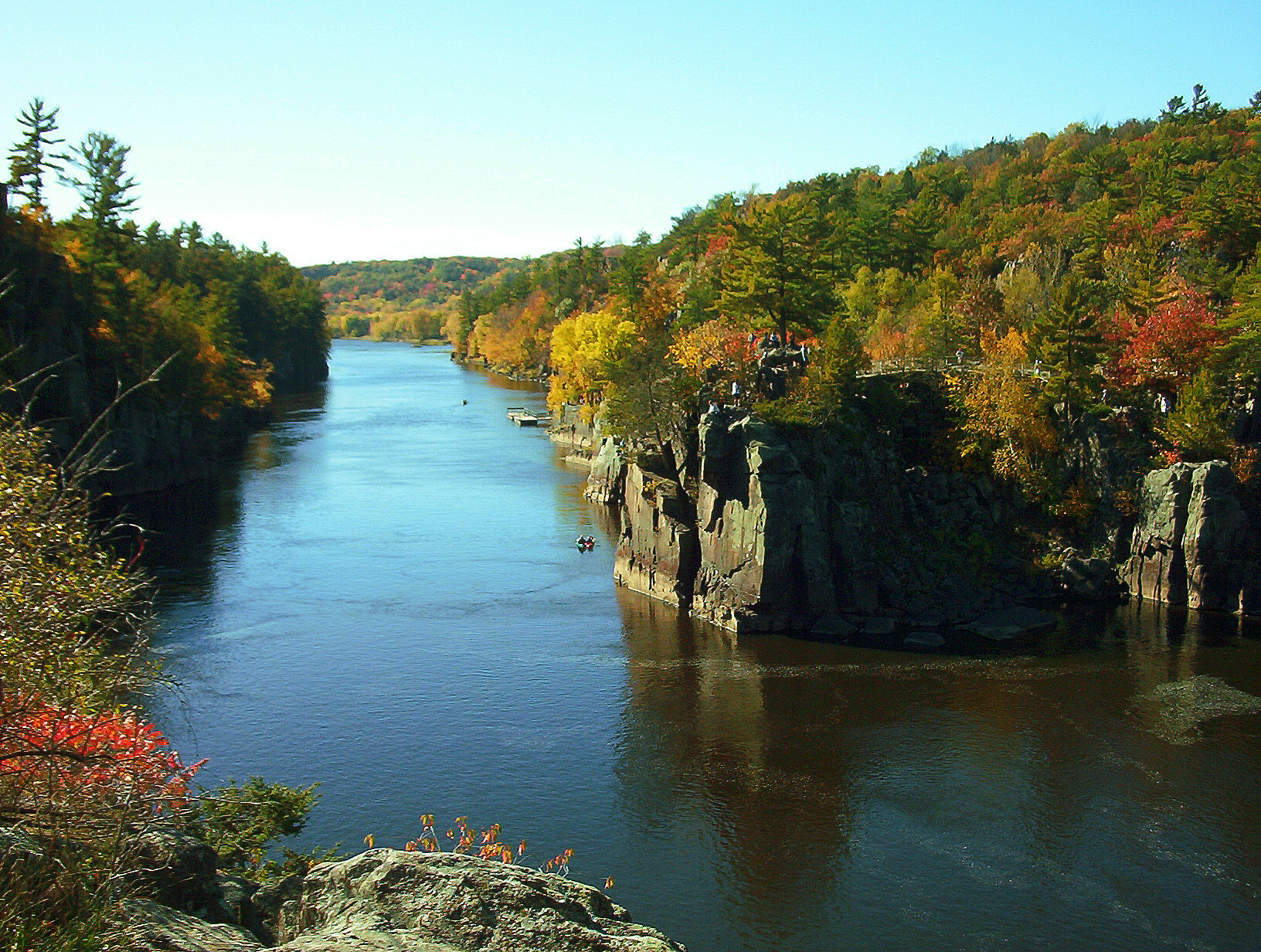
- The Dalles of the St. Croix River seen from the Wisconsin bank

- Location within Minnesota Location within Wisconsin Location within the United States
- Location: United States
- Coordinates: 45°23′30″N 92°39′55″W
- Area: 1,628 acres (6.59 km^{2})
- Elevation: 886 ft (270 m)
- Established: 1895
- Governing body: Minnesota Department of Natural Resources, Wisconsin Department of Natural Resources

- Interstate State Park WPA/Rustic Style Historic District
- U.S. National Register of Historic Places
- U.S. Historic district
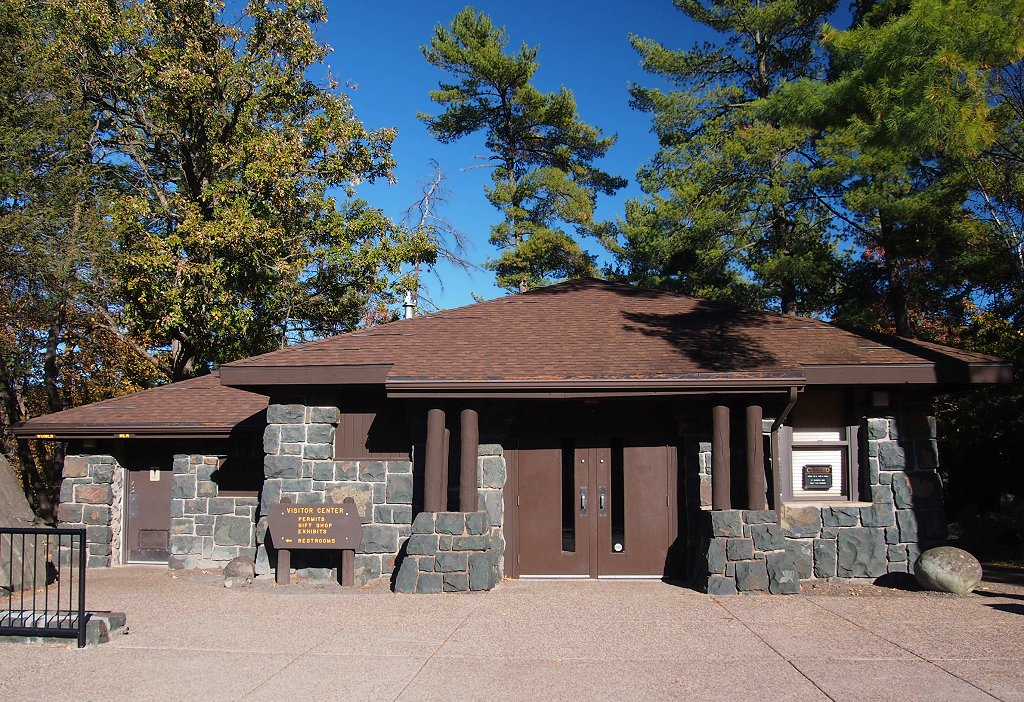
- 1939 Refectory built by the WPA, now the Minnesota park's visitor center
- Location: Off U.S. Hwy. 8, Shafer Township
- Nearest city: Taylors Falls, Minnesota
- Coordinates: 45°24′0″N 92°39′4″W
- Area: 6 acres (2.4 ha)
- Built: c. 1920–1939
- Architectural style: National Park Service rustic
- MPS: Minnesota State Park CCC/WPA/Rustic Style MPS
- NRHP reference No.: 89001664
- Added to NRHP: June 11, 1992

- Interstate State Park CCC/WPA/Rustic Style Campground
- U.S. National Register of Historic Places
- U.S. Historic district
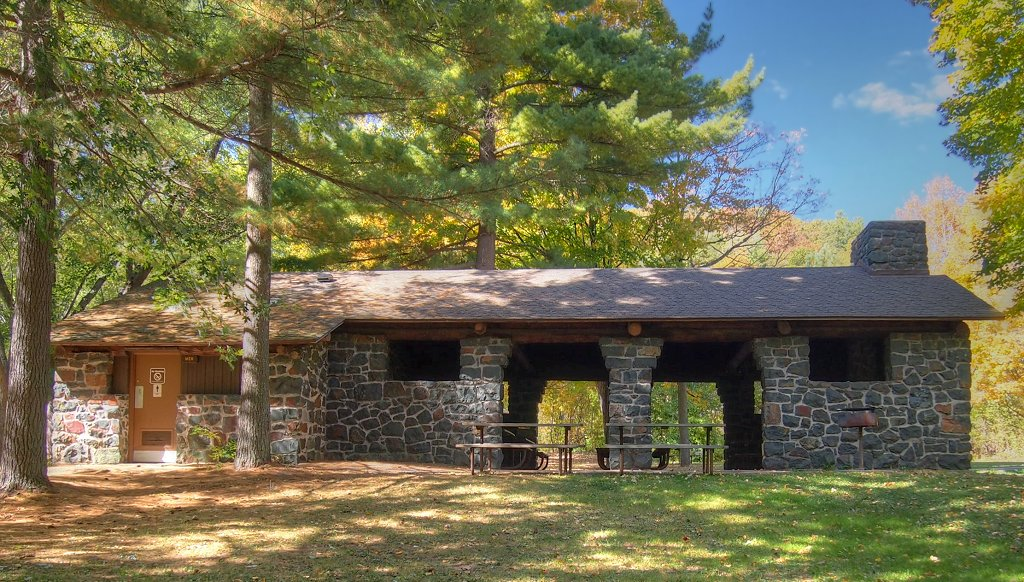
- 1938 Shelter/Refectory built by the WPA
- Location: Off US 8 SW of Taylors Falls, Shafer Township
- Nearest city: Taylors Falls, Minnesota
- Coordinates: 45°23′33″N 92°40′8″W
- Area: 22 acres (8.9 ha)
- Built: 1938, 1941
- Architectural style: National Park Service rustic
- MPS: Minnesota State Park CCC/WPA/Rustic Style MPS
- NRHP reference No.: 92000638
- Added to NRHP: June 11, 1992

Interstate Park comprises two adjacent state parks on the Minnesota–Wisconsin border, both named Interstate State Park. They straddle the Dalles of the St. Croix River, a deep basalt gorge with glacial potholes and other rock formations. The Wisconsin park is 1,330 acres (538 ha) and the Minnesota park is 298 acres (121 ha). The towns of Taylors Falls, Minnesota and St. Croix Falls, Wisconsin are adjacent to the park. Interstate Park is within the Saint Croix National Scenic Riverway and the Ice Age National Scientific Reserve. The western terminus of the Ice Age National Scenic Trail is on the Wisconsin side. On the Minnesota side, two areas contain National Park Service rustic style buildings and structures that are listed on the National Register of Historic Places.

== Geology ==
Rocks or sediment from three short intervals of geologic time, each from three different geological eras, Precambrian, Paleozoic, and Cenozoic, are exposed at the surface within Interstate Park. The oldest strata are of the Keweenawan Supergroup, which is a 2.5 miles (4.0 km) thick sequence of volcanic and sedimentary strata that fill a segment of the Midcontinent Rift System. During the formation of the Midcontinent Rift System, these strata accumulated about 1.1 billion years ago as a series of basaltic lava flows and alluvial fans filled an ancient rift valley to depth of over 2.5 miles (4.0 km). At least ten separate lava flows are exposed within the region of Interstate Park. Since their accumulation, these strata within Interstate Park area have undergone very low to low-grade metamorphism.

=== Paleozoic Era - Cambrian Period ===
In the Cambrian period of the Paleozoic Era, between 530 and 470 million years ago, the region was covered by a shallow sea which deposited sandstone and siltstone atop the basalt. This epoch of the Cambrian, the Furongian, was originally called the Croixian in North America because the layers exposed in this area were its type locality.

=== Cenozoic Era - Quaternary Period ===
The presence of older glacial deposits south of the Interstate Park demonstrates that the Laurentide Ice Sheet repeatedly glaciated it and surrounding areas over the Pleistocene Epoch. Within Wisconsin, these older glacial deposits consist of remnants of, highly weathered dark-gray loam till and lake sediment with reversed magnetic polarity and a deeply weathered, pre-Sangamonian Stage, reddish-brown, sandy loam till with normal magnetic polarity. Both the landforms and deposits related to these earlier glaciations have been either eroded or buried by the latest advance of the Laurentide Ice Sheet over this area of the Last Glacial Maximum.

The region of Interstate Park was deglaciated sometime between about 19,000 and 14,000 BP calibrated (16,000 and 12,000 ^{14}C uncalibrated). During this time, the Superior Lobe had retreated from the St. Croix Moraine northeastward to the Thompson Moraine. Between 14,000 and 11,500 BP calibrated (12,000 and 10,000 ^{14}C uncalibrated), an extensive set of ice marginal channels drained meltwater from the Thompson Moraine by way of the Brule channel into the newly formed St. Croix River.

The glacial landforms and sediments of Interstate Park were largely created during the retreat of the Superior Lobe from this region and periodic outburst flood events from proglacial lakes, e.g. Lake Duluth, since the Last Glacial Maximum. First, the retreat of the Superior lobe into the Lake Superior basin created proglacial lakes. Initially, these lakes consisted of small, proglacial lakes. Later, these lakes coalesced to form a large proglacial lake called glacial Lake Duluth, which was confined to the western Superior basin. The most prominent of multiple lake levels of glacial Lake Duluth is known as the Duluth level. There also was an older epi-Duluth level that lay above the Duluth level. The epi-Duluth level and a smaller precursor proglacial lake, named Lake Nemadji, drained through the higher Moose Lake (Portage) outlet into the Kettle River and into the St. Croix River. As the Lake Superior Lobe retreated, the Brule outlet opened and the higher Moose Lake was abandoned as a lower Duluth level was quickly established by massive and sudden outflow through the lower Brule outlet and down St. Croix River. The Brule outlet was abandoned when Lake Superior Lobe retreated from the Keweenaw Peninsula and opened lower eastward draining outlets. This caused the Duluth level to drop abruptly to post-Duluth levels and water to cease flowing into lower Brule outlet and down the St. Croix River.

It was during the regional retreat of the Lake Superior Lobe and glacial meltwater flow from deglaciation and glacial Lake Nemadji and Lake Duluth caused the entrenchment of the St. Croix River and the formation of the deep gorge of the St. Croix River of the St. Croix River valley and its famous potholes occurred. In and surrounding Polk County, Minnesota, geomorphic and stratigraphic relationships evidence exists for at least two drainage events.

A strath terrace, known as the Chengwatana surface provides evidence for the occurrence of the first drainage event. The Chengwatana surface is a scoured surface marked by distinct lemniscate landforms; bar-shaped landforms composed of sand; and a lag layer of cobbles and boulders. This lag layer overlies an unconformity eroded into older glacial till, lake sediment, or bedrock. This surface extends from the lower reaches of the Kettle River valley as far south as Sunrise, Minnesota. The Chengwatana surface likely was cut by water flowing down the Kettle River from the Moose Lake outlet of glacial Lake Nemadji and the Epi-Duluth level of glacial Lake Duluth. The association of the Chengwatana surface with glacial Lake Nemadji and the Epi-Duluth level of glacial Lake Duluth would make it most likely range in age from before 12,100 to about 11,700 BP calibrated.

The deep inner channel, which includes the Dalles, that forms the modern St. Croix River valley was excavated by a second drainage event. This inner channel is incised as a narrower valley cut into, and hence younger than, the Chengwatana surface. This demonstrates that the St. Croix valley is slightly younger than the Kettle River valley and Moose Lake outlet and was cut by water flowing out of the lower and younger Brule outlet of the Duluth level of glacial Lake Duluth. Because the trace of the Chengwatana surface grades to a terrace level higher than the potholes in International State Park, they were eroded by spillway water from Duluth level of glacial Lake Duluth. The association of the Duluth level of glacial Lake Duluth with the second discharge event and creation of the St. Croix valley and the potholes indicates that they were created between 10,800 and 10,600 BP calibrated.

The before-mentioned potholes were created starting with sand and gravel caught in eddies or whirlpools. Within the eddies, the sand and gravel were swirled around with such force that they drilled holes straight down into the rock. Larger rocks caught in the spin would polish the shafts smooth. The Glacial Gardens area on the Minnesota shore contains more than 80 of these glacial potholes, the greatest concentration in the world. When the massive flow of water through the Brule outlet and down the St. Croix River ceased, the potholes became exposed to the air. Dirt, vegetation, and rainwater have collected in them, disguising their true depths. Some have been excavated; one, the Bottomless Pit, is 10 feet (3.0 m) wide and 60 feet (18 m) deep, the deepest explored pothole in the world. Other unexcavated potholes in the park are even wider, suggesting that they may be deeper as well.

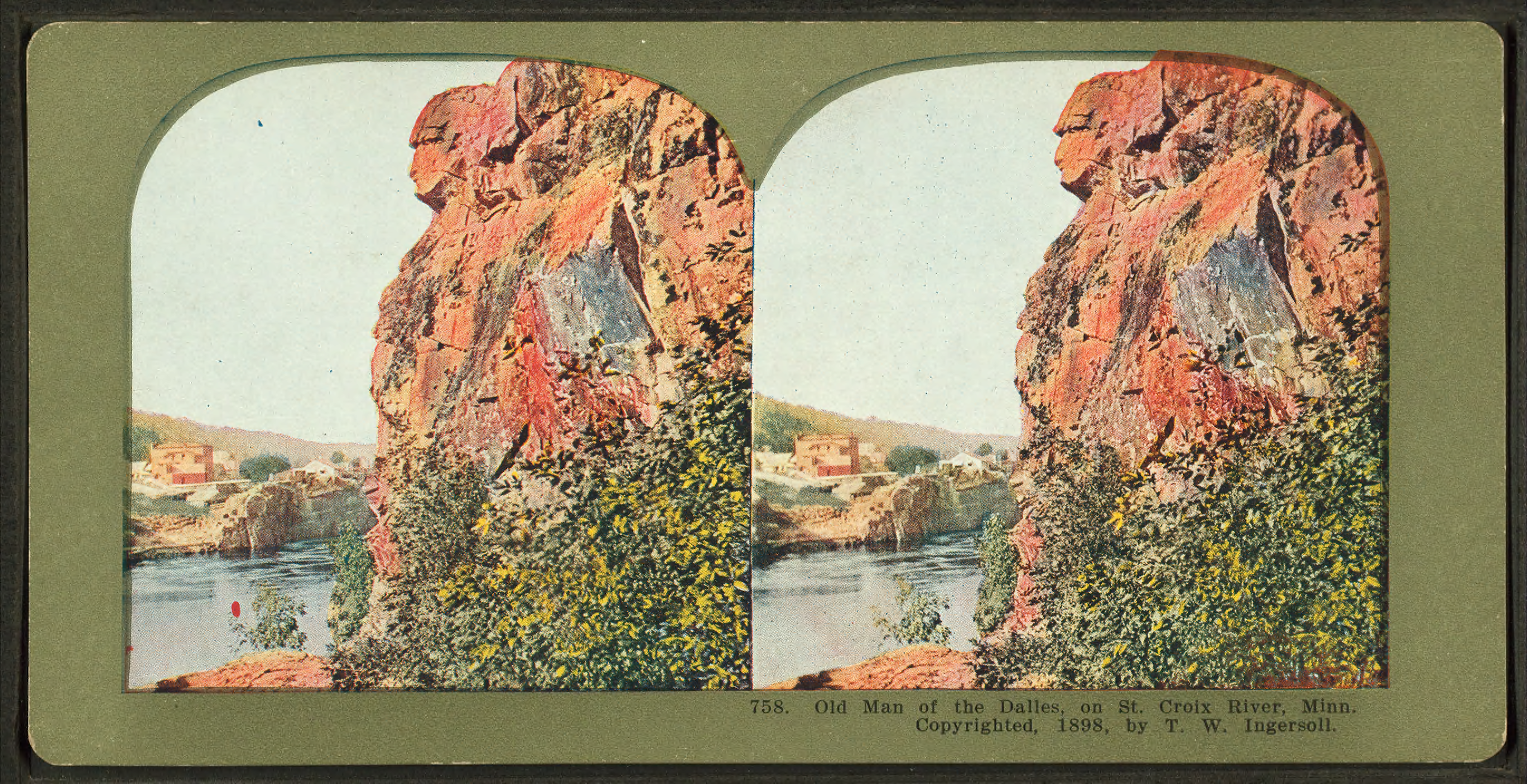
Stereoscopic image of the Old Man of the Dalles

Weathering has created other rock formations. The Old Man of the Dalles on the Wisconsin shore resembles a human face. Another formation resembling a Maltese cross has been erroneously claimed as the origin of the name St. Croix ('holy cross' in the French language). A former formation on the Minnesota side called the Devil's Chair looked like a high-backed throne.

== Biology ==
Several habitats are found within the parks. Originally most of the land was forested with large eastern white pines, but was denuded by loggers. Most of the vegetation today is second-growth forest, with some sections dominated by maples and basswoods and others by eastern white pines. Drier areas support oak savanna while wetter areas bear floodplain forest. The driest hilltops even support the brittle prickly pear cactus, the only cactus species native to Wisconsin. Early successional species take hold on the exposed basalt rocks. Over 400 species of ferns and flowering plants have been catalogued in the Wisconsin park.

Mammals found in the parks include white-tailed deer, foxes, raccoons, gray squirrels, river otters, minks, skunks, muskrats, and beavers, and 150 species of birds have been identified in the park, of which at least 75 species are known to nest in the area.

== Cultural history ==
The St. Croix River was an important transportation route for Native Americans. Prehistoric tools have been found in the park, but no village sites. The first Europeans to pass through the Dalles were Daniel Greysolon, Sieur du Lhut, and his 1680 expedition, though he made no particular mention of the site Fur traders used the river extensively, and a French fort was located near the Minnesota campground in the early 18th century.

=== Logging era ===
During the logging era from 1837 to 1898, logs were rafted down the St. Croix River. By 1857 a sawmill was operating near what is now the Minnesota campground, joined in 1867 by a boatbuilding yard. Both were owned by a leading citizen of Taylors Falls, W.H.C. Folsom, after whom an island in the park is named. The narrow gorge and the sharp turn at Angle Rock caused severe logjams in 1865, 1877, 1883, and 1886. The 1886 St. Croix River log jam is believed to have been the worst in history; at least 150 million board feet of logs were backed up for three miles (4.8 km). Neither dynamite nor steamboats with tow ropes were able to budge the jam. A crew of 175 men working 24 hours a day under electric lights took six weeks to break the jam, during which time several mills downstream went out of business. To control the water flow and prevent further catastrophic jams, the Nevers Dam was built upstream in 1890 in what is now Wild River State Park. The walls of the Dalles rise from 50 to 250 feet (76 m) above the river.

During this same period, the Dalles of the St. Croix became a popular visitor attraction. Steamboat service to Taylors Falls began in 1838, and a railroad connection was finished in 1880. The catastrophic logjams drew tourists in droves, as many as a thousand a day.

=== Park creation ===
In the 1860s businessmen from St. Paul proposed mining the basalt of the Dalles to make gravel, a plan which galvanized interest in protecting the area. Locals had also been growing concerned by encroaching buildings and vandalism of the rock formations. A travel agent named George Hazzard became the leading advocate for a park, and gained the support of newspapers, several landowners in the area, influential people like W.H.C. Folsom, and ultimately the state senator and representative. These last two introduced a bill to the Minnesota Legislature calling for the creation of the State Park of the Dalles of the St. Croix and urging cooperation with Wisconsin to protect both sides of the Dalles. The bill passed in 1895, creating the second state park in Minnesota. Hazzard and his allies had a more difficult time lobbying the Wisconsin Legislature, but succeeded in 1900 with the creation of the first state park in Wisconsin, resulting in the first interstate parkland collaboration in the United States.

In 1906 the commissioner of the Minnesota park asked a family from Stillwater to conduct boat tours of the Dalles. Beginning with a small powerboat, this concession business grew quickly. In 1910 they began renting canoes and rowboats, and offered tours on progressively larger boats. Today they are still in business, family-owned for four generations.

=== New Deal development ===
U.S. Route 8 descends through the Minnesota park in a road cut blasted in 1931. The Minnesota Department of Transportation built stone overlooks and guardrails along the highway in the mid-1930s. Civilian Conservation Corps Company 633 arrived in 1935, building roads, trails, picnic grounds, plumbing, the beach and beach house on Lake O' the Dalles, and retaining walls. The CCC camp departed in December 1937 and were replaced by the 4610th Company of the Works Progress Administration in July 1938. Using basalt quarried in the park by the CCC, they built restrooms, picnic shelters, water fountains, and retaining walls. These historical structures are clustered in two separate areas of the Minnesota park: in the campground and near the Glacial Gardens. The two areas were listed as separate historic districts on the National Register of Historic Places in 1992. They are considered significant as examples of New Deal federal work relief, early state park development, National Park Service rustic design, and—in separating the intensive use of camping and picnicking from the open-air museum of the Glacial Gardens—landscape architecture.

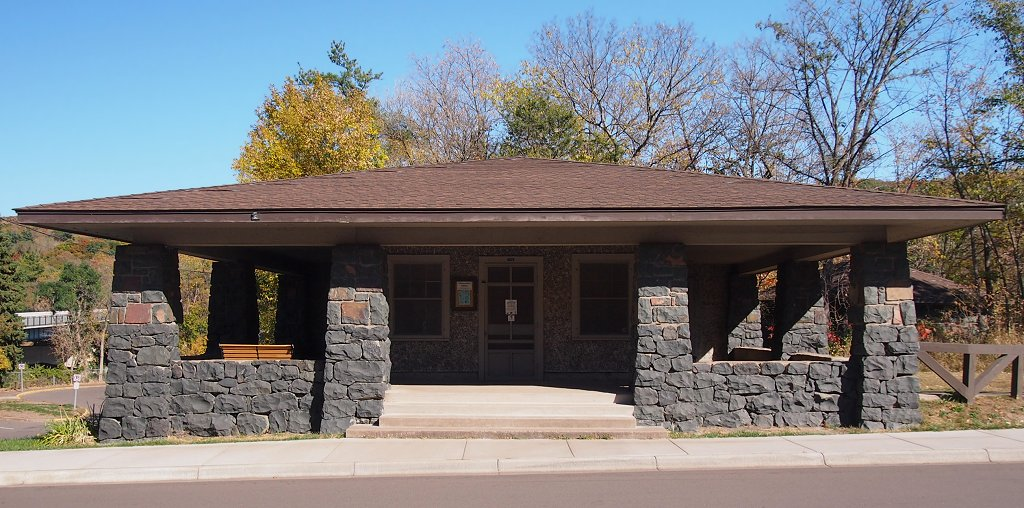
The c. 1920 women's rest room influenced later park facilities

The 6-acre (2.4 ha) Interstate State Park CCC/WPA/Rustic Style Historic District at the northeast end of the Minnesota park contains six contributing properties. These consist of three buildings, two structures, and an object. Noteworthy are the women's rest room (built c. 1920) and men's rest room (built 1928), which predate the federal developments and influenced the WPA's use of rustic style in the park. These two buildings are situated at the north end of the parking lot; the men's rest room is noted for its placement relative to the rock outcroppings and the women's rest room was modified by the WPA in 1941. The third contributing building is the 1939 Refectory, originally a concession building renovated in 1981 with restrooms and office space to become the current visitor center. The two contributing structures are the 1937 stone curb in the parking lot and a 150-foot-long (46 m) retaining wall built in 1938 at the south end of the Glacial Gardens. The contributing object is a 1938 water fountain at the south end of the parking lot.

The 22-acre (8.9 ha) Interstate State Park CCC/WPA/Rustic Style Campground at the southwest end of the Minnesota park contains six contributing properties as well. These consist of three buildings—the 1938 Sanitation Building (restrooms at the west end of the picnic area), 1938 Shelter/Refectory (in the center of the picnic area), and 1941 Combination Building (restrooms in the campground)—and three objects (the drinking fountains scattered in the picnic area) also built in 1938. The Combination Building was based on a design also used in Whitewater State Park in 1938, though the use of different local materials gives them a very different appearance. An open-sided picnic shelter with a free-standing metal fireplace was actually built in 1980 and is considered a non-contributing property to the district.

=== Devil's Chair vandalism ===
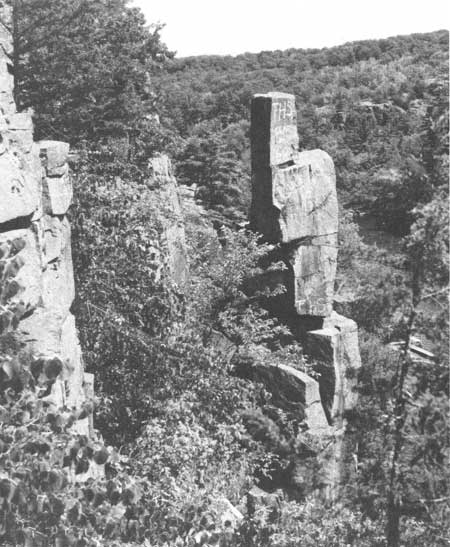
Devils Chair in 1918

In April 2005 a landmark rock formation called the Devil's Chair collapsed. An investigation found that the basalt pinnacle was toppled by vandals using crowbars and possibly a hydraulic spreader. Despite a reward for tips, the culprits have never been identified.

== Recreation ==
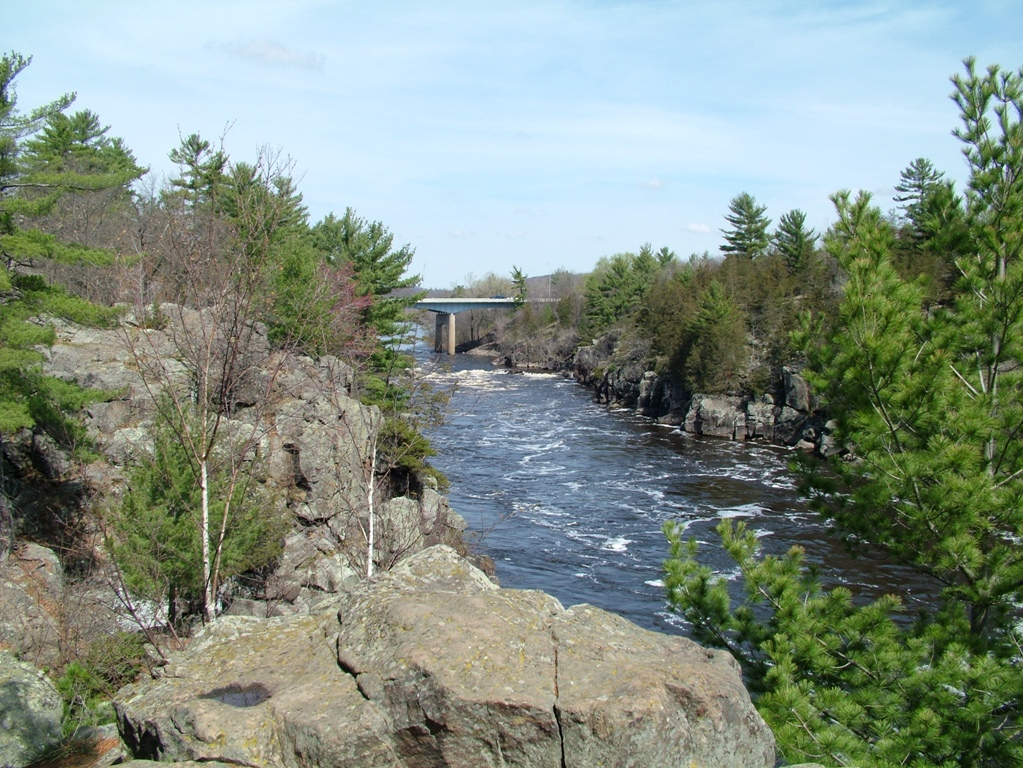
The Dalles of the St. Croix River seen from the Minnesota bank

Located an hour's drive from Minneapolis–Saint Paul, Interstate Park has received annual visitation comparable to many U.S. national parks since the 1930s.

The two parks are administered separately and require separate vehicle permits. In 1987 each park began honoring the other state's permit on weekdays, but the practice has since ceased. It is possible to walk between the parks by crossing the U.S. Route 8 bridge. Both parks have a visitor center with interpretive displays and a gift shop.

The Wisconsin park has two campgrounds with 85 sites. A group campsite accommodates up to 60 people. There are nine miles (14 km) of trail.

The Minnesota park has a campground with showers and 37 sites, 22 of which have electrical hookups. A group campsite accommodates up to 100 people. There are four miles (6.4 km) of trail. A long-standing concession offers scenic boat cruises and canoe and kayak rentals with shuttle service back from near Osceola, Wisconsin, and William O'Brien State Park.

There is a swimming beach on Lake O' the Dalles, in the Wisconsin park. Swimming in the river is dangerous because of strong currents. Rock climbing is permitted on many of the cliffs on either side of the river. In addition to the cliffs, there are many boulders on both sides of the river that are open to climbing. Certain sensitive areas, as well as all potholes, are off limits to climbing.
