= Yellow River (St. Croix River tributary) =

River in Wisconsin, United States

The Yellow River is a 70-mile river that runs from a headwaters northeast of Spooner, Wisconsin to the St. Croix River at Danbury, Wisconsin. It is a tributary of the St. Croix River.
