= Sunrise River =

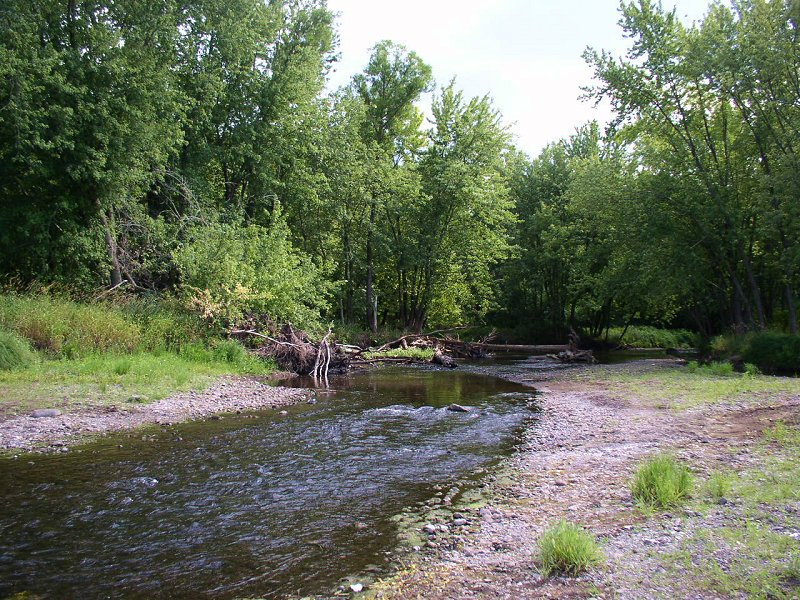
- The Sunrise River in Wild River State Park

- Mouth of the Sunrise River

Location
- Country: United States
- State: Minnesota
- Counties: Chisago, Washington

Physical characteristics
- Source
  - coordinates: 45°17′24″N 92°58′28″W
- Mouth
  - coordinates: 45°33′59″N 92°51′45″W
- Length: 39.1 miles (62.9 km)
- Basin size: 381 sq. miles
- Discharge
  - location: Lindstrom, MN
  - average: 102 cu/ft. per sec.

Basin features
- River system: St. Croix River

The Sunrise River is a 39.1-mile-long (62.9 km) tributary of the St. Croix River in east–central Minnesota in the United States. It originates within the boundaries of the Comfort Lake - Forest Lake Watershed District near the city of Forest Lake in Washington County. Its headwaters are considered several small tributaries that flow into and contribute to Forest Lake, the longest of which is the Washington Judicial Ditch 6. From the outflow from Forest Lake, the river flows north, accepting the South Branch from the west near the city of Wyoming, and continues north into Mud Lake, where the West Branch, which rises in southeast Isanti County and briefly enters Anoka County, joins it near the city of Stacy. From Stacy it flows generally north-northeast through Chisago County to meet the St. Croix River within Wild River State Park near the communities of Sunrise and Almelund. Not far upstream from its mouth, the Sunrise collects its North Branch, which rises in Isanti County and flows through the city of North Branch.

Sunrise River is the English translation of the native Ojibwe-language name, "Memokage zibi. Keep sunrising river."

There are several dams on the Sunrise River. The Sunrise River watershed spans 381 square miles in Isanti, Pine, Chisago, Washington, and Anoka counties.

== See also ==
- List of rivers of Minnesota
- List of longest streams of Minnesota
