= 1886 St. Croix River log jam =

American logging incident

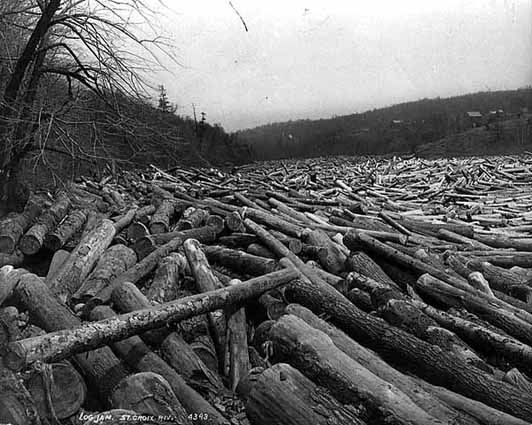
The 1886 log jam on the St Croix River near Taylors Falls, Minnesota

On June 13, 1886, a log jam developed in the St. Croix River, close to Taylors Falls, Minnesota, and St. Croix Falls, Wisconsin, United States. The river was used to transport large quantities of logs from the forests upstream to the sawmills, and log jams disrupted this business. The 1886 jam was described at the time by a local journalist as "the jammedest jam" he had encountered, and was very difficult to clear, with hundreds of men working for six weeks to clear it, eventually using steamboats and dynamite. The jam was also a major tourist attraction, with thousands of spectators every day. After the jam was broken up in July, cleanup work to remove the logs on the river banks continued until September.

== Background ==
St. Croix River near Taylors Falls

After the Wisconsin Territory was established in 1836, large amounts of Native American land were ceded to the United States via the 1837 Treaty of St. Peters. Much of the land was covered in vast pine forests, and logging activities started soon after. This was a winter activity, as the trees were so large that the only way to move them through the forests was by horse-drawn sleds, usually over ice. Teams of lumberjacks cut down trees all winter and collected them by the shores of the St. Croix River and its tributaries. Pine is light and floats well, so the logs could be easily transported downstream by log driving in the river. The logs were marked with the relevant company's timber mark and then released into the river when the snow melted and the water rose in spring. Workers known as "river pigs" guided the logs down the river and kept them moving, especially at difficult places like shallows, rapids or sharp bends. Downstream, the logs were caught in the log boom at the St. Croix Boom Site, where they were sorted by owner, bundled into rafts and then sent to the sawmills.

== Causes and start of the 1886 log jam ==
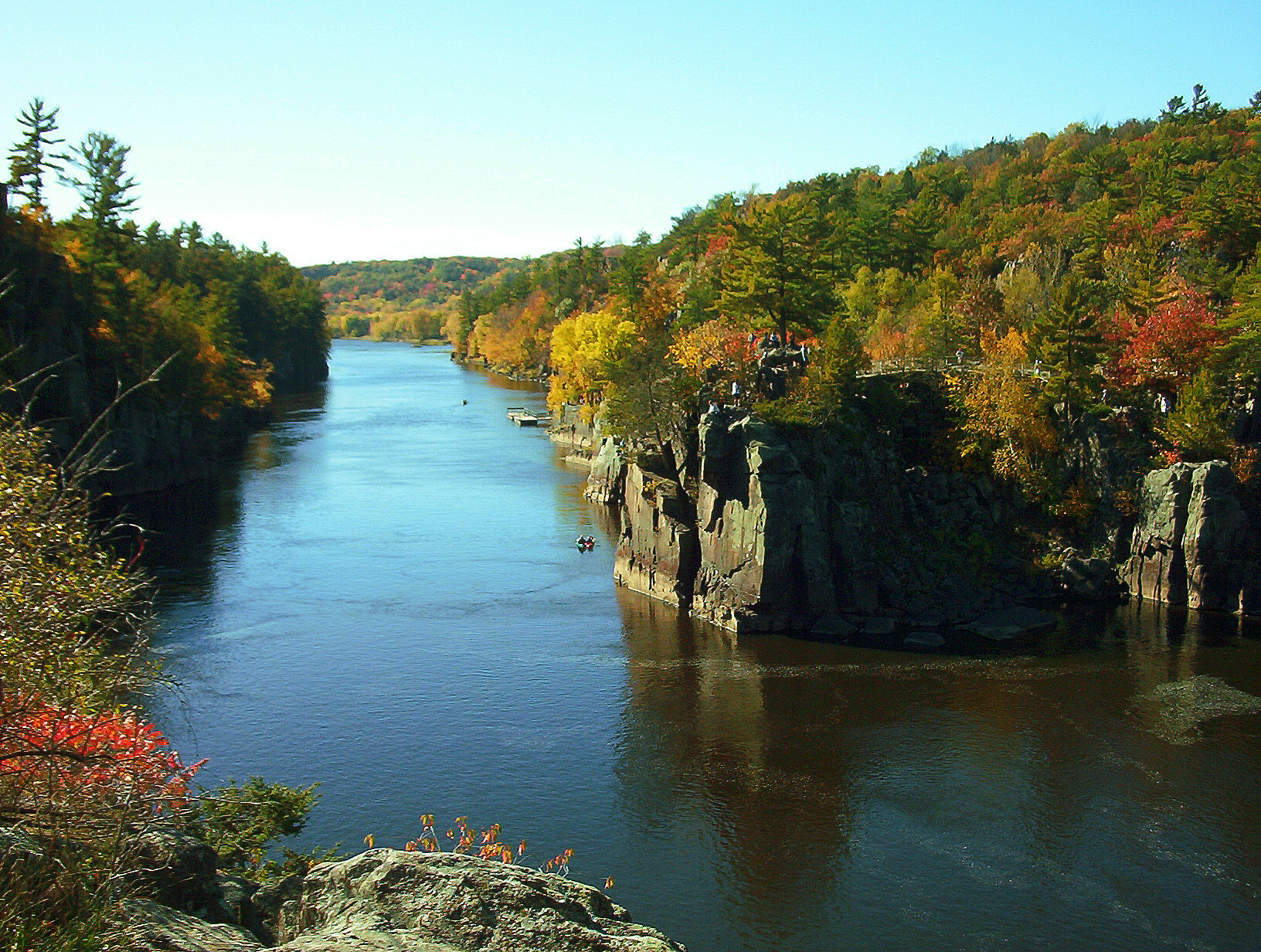
Dalles of the St. Croix with the bend at Angle Rock

In the area now covered by Interstate State Park, the St. Croix river marks the border between Minnesota and Wisconsin. It runs through a narrow gorge, the Dalles of the St. Croix, and makes a 90 degree turn at Angle Rock. The spring of 1886 was very dry, so the water level was too low to transport logs. This began to change when the Clam River dam was dynamited by the hermit Robert Davidson, who claimed the dam interfered with his meadow lands. Davidson was later charged for blowing up the dam and jailed for contempt of court. The release of the Clam River water caused the St. Croix to rise slightly. Sluice dams on several other tributaries, including Kettle River and Snake River, were opened as well, and coincidentally, heavy rain storms caused the rivers to rise further. Large numbers of logs were dumped into the river all at once, more than the river or the driving crews working along could control. Shortly after midnight on June 13, 1886, while the driving crews were asleep in their tents, the logs were caught at Angle Rock and quickly started to accumulate. More and more logs ran onto the jam, including the 15 million board feet of the Clam River drive. The Stillwater Messenger reprinted a report from the Taylor's Falls Journal about the start of the jam:

Last week the lumbermen wore a dejected and lost-their-last-friend look, for the water in the rivers was steadily falling and their logs were almost inextricably jammed at Wood river, Kettle river rapids, the mouth of the Namagon and other places. Crews had been discharged, and there seemed little prospect of getting the logs to market for an indefinite time. But it remained for Davidson, the hermit, to strike the key-note for a change to all this, by blowing out the Clam river dam with dynamite. The water from that stream caused a slight rise, and by one of Elias McKean's "most remarkable coincidences", there seemed to be a concert of action by the elements and otherwise. Other dams were opened, heavy rain storms flooded the upper country, and there was immediately a boom in the water of the Saint Croix, and logs went booming along toward the great Stillwater boom. Logs from the "low-water" drives were easily floated off, and came down stream in immense rafts, almost blockading the river as they moved along. Reaching the famous dells of the Saint Croix, their course was interrupted. The channel was too narrow and the current too sluggish to allow their passage in such large bodies, and shortly after midnight, Sunday morning, they "hung-up" and began jamming and piling. Something such a catastrophe has been anticipated, and yet it came unexpectedly, for the men who had been here for weeks, building sheerbooms at the eddies in the dells, and keeping watch to prevent a jam, were asleep in their tents, and their booms were broken, and the formation of the biggest jam ever known commenced before they were aware of it.

— Stillwater Messenger

An estimated 125 to 150 million board feet of pine became stuck in the log jam. For comparison, the average annual production of pine in the St. Croix valley between 1870 and 1889 was 241 million board feet.

== Clearing the log jam ==
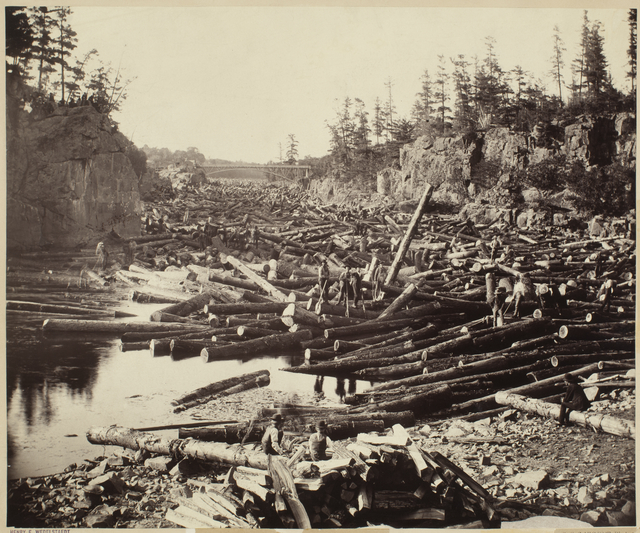
1886 log jam, Dalles of the St Croix, with bridge in background

Smaller log jams could be cleared just by human labor, with river pigs releasing key logs, but this log jam was more difficult and dammed up the river. On June 18, 1886, The New York Times reported that the jam was over two miles long and the largest to ever occur in the Northwest, and four hundred men were working day and night to clear it, while it was still growing at a rate of 700,000 board feet per hour. The logs were owned by more than 100 companies, who joined forces and shared the costs of breaking the jam, which were about $75,000 in total. When the log jam started to endanger the two-year-old bridge at Taylors Falls (which until then had been thought to be safe), logs sticking out of the almost 70 foot high pile were sawn off to protect the abutments. In attempts to clear the logs, two steamboats were used to tug at the front end of the jam. Land-based steam engines and horses were also used to pull out logs from the jam with ropes, with $100 worth of ropes having to be replaced every day due to wear. Around six to eight million feet of logs were released in this way. Finally, it was attempted to use dynamite bombs. On July 2, 1886, a 24-pound dynamite bomb was exploded, releasing a million feet of logs into the water and moving another 15 million feet out of the main jam. This had broken the jam in two, but also released most of the water that had been held back by the jam. As flowing water was necessary to get the logs moving, this could have impeded the work, but rain soon replenished the river. When a channel was cleared through the jam, only the logs on the banks still required clearing. Cleanup work involving at least 70 people was still ongoing in mid-September.

== Tourist attraction ==
Log jams were a major disruption to the sawmills: the 57-day 1883 jam in the same area had played a part in causing the bankruptcy of Marine Mill in Marine on St. Croix. On the other hand, log jams brought large crowds of spectators and were welcomed by the local tourism industry in Taylors Falls. Thousands of tourists per day came to see the jam, by special excursion train from St. Paul and by steamboat from Stillwater. The local hotels and restaurants were packed.

== End of log jams ==
To end the threat of log jams disrupting the industry, lumbermen organized to construct a dam. In 1890, Nevers Dam was finished at a cost of almost $250,000, situated 11 miles (18 km) upstream of St. Croix Falls. It was said to be the "largest pile-driven dam in the world". The dam gave the lumbermen the ability to control the flow of both water and logs on the St. Croix River, and there were no further log jams on the St. Croix after 1886.
