= Friends of society =

A "friends of" is type of not-for-profit society created solely to support some other organization or enterprise, typically through fundraising, lobbying, and publicity. They are very common in the galleries, libraries, archives, and museums (GLAM) sector. They have a long history going back to the 19th century, particularly in Western Europe.

The first know friends of a museum society is the Vorarlberger Landesmuseumverein of Austria, set up in 1857. Other early examples include the Société des amis des monuments parisiens ("Friends of Parisien Monuments", 1885), the Société des amis des monuments rouennais ("Friends of Rouennais Monuments", founded 1886), and the Société des amis du Louvre ("Friends of the Louvre", founded 1897), the later of which became so popular that it has an American counterpart, the American Friends of the Louvre, based in New York.

== World Federation of the Friends of Museums ==
The World Federation of Friends of Museums was conceived in 1967 by Luis Monreal, the then-curator of the Barcelona Museums (1965–1974) and later the secretary general of the International Council of Museums (1974–1985). The Barcelona Friends invited friends groups from around the world to meet in Barcelona in 1972 to coincide with their 40th anniversary. They agreed to create a global federation that would hold world congresses every three years. The first world congress was held in 1975 in Brussels. Subsequent hosts have been,

- 1978 | Florence, Italy
- 1981 | Birmingham, U.K.
- 1984 | Paris, France
- 1987 | Toronto, Canada
- 1990 | Cordoba, Spain
- 1993 | Treviso, Italy
- 1996 | Oaxaca, Mexico
- 1999 | Sydney, Australia
- 2002 | Buenos Aires, Argentina
- 2005 | Sevilla, Spain
- 2008 | Jerusalem, Israel
- 2011 | Genoa, Italy
- 2014 | Berlin, Germany
- 2017 | Verona, Italy
- 2019 | Montreal, Canada
- 2022 | Marseilles, France

Member organization include 18 national friends federations, 27 associate members (friends groups outside of a national federation).
