= William O'Brien State Park =

State park in Minnesota

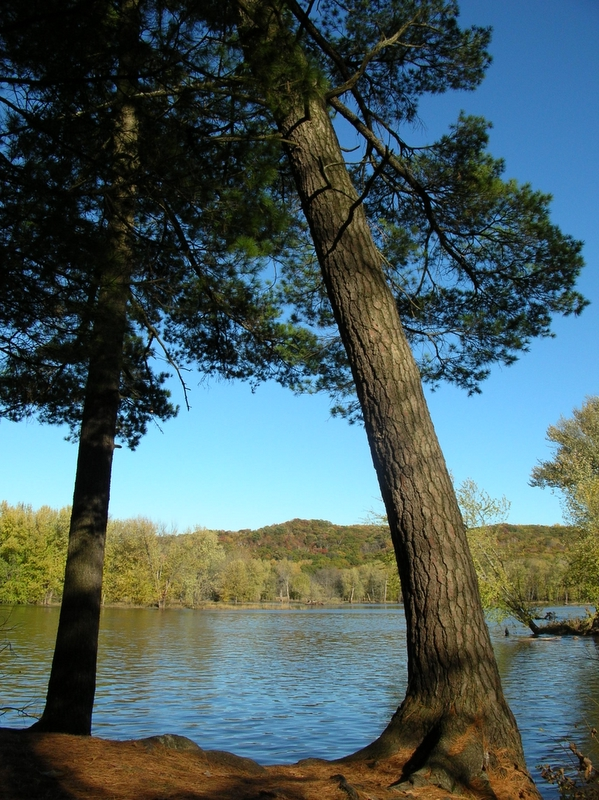
- The St. Croix River at William O'Brien State Park

- Location within Minnesota Location within the United States
- Location: Washington County, Minnesota, United States
- Coordinates: 45°13′9″N 92°45′57″W
- Area: 1,520 acres (6.2 km^{2})
- Elevation: 801 ft (244 m)
- Established: 1947
- Governing body: Minnesota Department of Natural Resources

William O'Brien State Park is a 1,520-acre (6.2 km^{2}) state park of Minnesota, USA, along the St. Croix River. Its hiking trails traverse rolling glacial moraine, riparian zones, restored oak savanna, wooded areas and bogs. It is a popular place for birdwatching, picnics, camping, cross-country skiing, canoeing, fishing, and other typical outdoor recreational activities.

The park is located approximately two miles north of the town of Marine on St. Croix, Minnesota.

== Wildlife ==
This park is home to raccoons, white-tailed deer, foxes, minks, beavers and woodchucks. Birdwatchers often spot various raptors, woodpeckers, bluebirds, orioles, herons, and a variety of warblers.

== History ==
The St. Croix river valley was inhabited by Dakota and Ojibwe tribes. European trappers commercialized the fur-trade in the 17th century. Extensive logging took place in the mid-19th century; white pines were the target and most other tree species were ignored. Once the white pine was gone the lumber companies were happy to sell, and a lumber baron named William O'Brien bought up much of the land for his personal estate. In 1945, 20 years after William O'Brien's death, his daughter Alice offered 180 acres (0.73 km^{2}) along the riverfront to the state. The donation was eagerly accepted, as Minnesota did not yet have a state park near the Twin Cities, and the park was ratified by the legislature two years later. The proximity to the metro area was a mixed blessing. Land was added to the park at every opportunity, to reduce crowding and to prevent housing developments from being built right up to the boundary. In 1958‚ S. David Greenberg donated Greenberg Island in memory of his parents. Accessible only by canoe‚ the island has become a haven for wildlife and wildflowers. The park was expanded into the bluffs west of Highway 95 and a second campground added. A large tract was added in 1973, leapfrogging a rail line, and another 120 acres (0.49 km^{2}) came in 1986. William O'Brien remains one of the top five most-visited state parks in Minnesota.

== Recreation ==
- Boating:
  - A concessionaire based inside the park rents canoes hourly and daily, and provides shuttle service back from take-out points.
  - Public boat ramp. This section of the Saint Croix National Scenic Riverway is officially a "slow-speed" zone. Jetskis are not permitted.
- Camping:
  - 2 group camps along the river provide tent camping opportunities for 35-50 people each.
  - Drive-in camping is available for both tents and RVs. There are two main camping areas, one near the river and one on top of the bluffs.
  - Several sites on top of the bluff are accessible via a short (max. 100 yards) walk from a parking area.
  - Small, rustic camper cabins in the campground on top of the bluff offer slightly more comfortable camping. Usually feature bunk beds and a screen-porch. They do not have running water or indoor bathrooms, though they are located within walking distance of campground bathrooms.
- Fishing: Northern pike, walleye, bass, and trout can be caught from the St. Croix riverbank. There is a fishing pier near the outlet of Lake Alice.
- Swimming: Sandy beach on Lake Alice. No swimming in river because of currents.
- Trails: There are 12 miles (19 km) of hiking/cross-country skiing trails in the park, including trails that range from easy to difficult.

== Sources ==
- Arthur, Anne. Minnesota's State Parks. Adventure Publications, Inc.: Cambridge, MN, 1998.
- Bewer, Tim. Moon Handbooks: Minnesota. Avalon Travel Publishing: Emeryville, CA, 2004.
- Meyer, Roy W. Everyone's Country Estate: A History of Minnesota's State Parks. Minnesota Historical Society Press: St. Paul, 1991.
- Minnesota Department of Natural Resources. 2006. The Minnesota Department of Natural Resources Web Site (online).
