= Lake Duluth =

Coordinates: 47°40′N 88°48′W

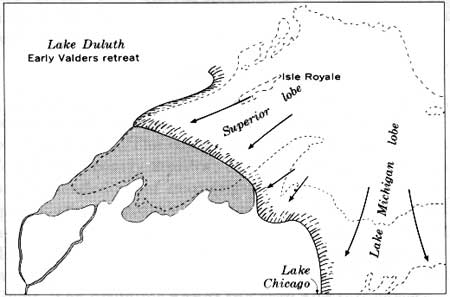
- Glacial Lake Duluth

- Location within Michigan
- Location: North America
- Group: Great Lakes
- Lake type: former lake
- Etymology: Sieur Duluth
- Primary inflows: Laurentide Ice Sheet
- Primary outflows: St. Croix River
- Basin countries: Canada; United States
- First flooded: 11,000 years before present
- Max. length: 152 mi (245 km)
- Max. width: 73 mi (117 km)
- Surface elevation: 1,300 ft (396 m)
- References: Professional Paper 154—A, Moriaines and Shore Lines of Lake Superior Basin: Frank Leverett; United States Government Printing Office, Washington; February 9, 1929

Lake Duluth was a proglacial lake that formed in the Lake Superior drainage basin as the Laurentide Ice Sheet retreated. The oldest existing shorelines were formed after retreat from the Greatlakean advance (previously called the Valders), sometime around 11,000 years B.P. Lake Duluth formed at the western end of the Lake Superior basin. Lake Duluth overflowed south through outlets in Minnesota and Wisconsin at an elevation of around 331 m above sea level.

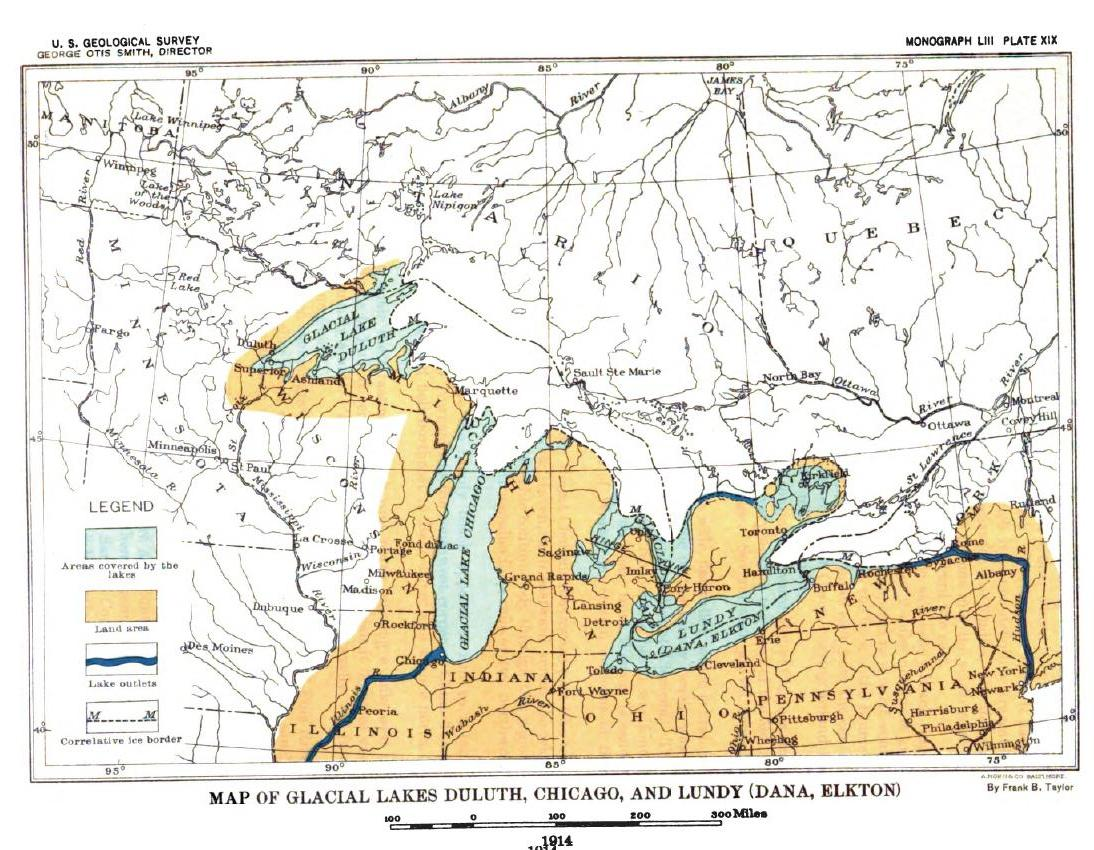
Map of Glacial Lakes Duluth, Chicago, and Lundy (USGS 1915)

== Predecessor lakes ==
As the Superior lobe of the Laurentian Ice Sheet melted, water became trapped along the ice margin and formed several independent lakes. The modern water basins in which these lakes stood have been used for their names. Lake Nemadji occupied the headwaters of the Nemadji River, Lake Brule occupied part of the Brule River basin, and Lake Ontonagon was in the Ontonagon River basin. These lakes are all west of the Keweenaw Peninsula. To the east, the ice melt drained into Green Bay or Lake Michigan through channels crossing the western part of the upper peninsula of Michigan. Lake Duluth extended a few miles farther east than the Keweenaw Peninsula, to the border of the Huron Mountains, east of Keweenaw Bay. In the early part of the recession of the ice front Lake Duluth, with an outlet from the Brule River Valley through the St. Croix River Valley, was present in the western part of the Lake Superior Basin. A little later the ice border retreated sufficiently to allow the small independent lakes to become a part of Lake Duluth or to be drained by the lowering of the water level, for in general the water level was lowered as these lakes merged with Lake Duluth.

- Lake St. Louis was one of the bordering lakes present when the Superior ice lobe was at its full extent. It stood in the part of the St. Louis River drainage basin northwest of the border of the Superior lobe.
- Lake Nemadji was an outlet channel leading west from the west end of the Lake Superior Basin to Moose Lake, where it joined the outlet of Lake St. Louis.
- Lake Brule was a small lake in the Brule River basin south of the copper range. It has its outlet to the St. Croix Valley. This was before Lake Duluth gained the St. Croix as its outlet.
- Lake Ashland occupied several townships in northwestern Ashland County, Wisconsin. It extended west in Bayfield County to the east slope of the Bayfield Peninsula.
- Lake Ontonagon occupied much of the Ontonagon basin, south of the copper range. The ice border remained along the copper range for a long period during its existence.

== Limits of the lake ==
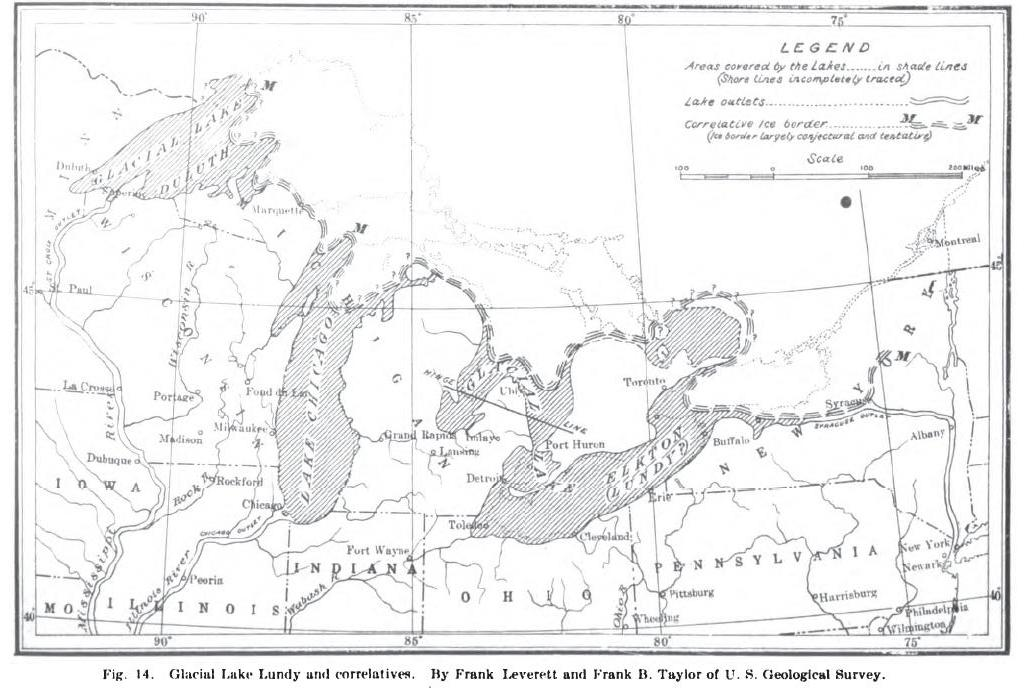
Map of Prehistoric lakes in the Great Lakes Basin at the end of the Wisconsin Ice Epoch

As the ice lobe retreated northwards, the independent lakes listed above joined together, forming a single lake at the level of the St. Croix Valley outlet. It is probable that several small glacial lakes in succession, Lakes Nemadji, Ashland, and Ontonagon, merged at lower levels with that of Lake Brule. Lake Nemadji and Lake Ashland dropped less than 20 feet (6.1 m). Lake Ontonagon dropped nearly 200 feet (61 m). Its area is now land. Several narrow bays of Lake Duluth, extended up each of the tributaries of Ontonagon River south of the copper range.

The ice lobe retreated eastward in the Superior basin, taking a long period of time to completely leave the basin. During the process, the outlet continued to deepen and the beaches around the lake continued to drop. Thus, the higher beaches in the eastern portion of the basin are extension of middle and lower beaches in the western basin. The eastern limits of Lake Duluth on the south shore have been found to be at the Huron Mountains, in Marquette County, Michigan. Once the ice receded to the east of the mountains, new outlets opened across the Upper Peninsula of Michigan, carrying the melt water into the Lake Michigan basin. Lake Duluth was lowered as lower lines drainage along the ice front. Eventually the water level reached that of Lake Algonquin. The body of water occupied the western part of the Lake Superior basin as well as the basins of Lake Michigan and Lake Huron and finally the eastern part of the Lake Superior basin. The eastern limits of Lake Duluth on the north coast of Lake Superior have not been determined. It is known, however, that the lake extended at least to the Kaministiquia River basin west of Fort William, Ontario. It is probable that there was a protrusion of the ice into Keweenaw Bay at the time of greatest expansion of Lake Duluth, and the east end of the Keweenaw Peninsula may have been beneath the ice down to the time the Lake Duluth waters were drained eastward.

== See also ==
- Glacial history of Minnesota
- Lake Minong
- List of prehistoric lakes
- Nipissing Great Lakes
- Proglacial lakes of Minnesota
