= Anne Neu Brindley =

American politician

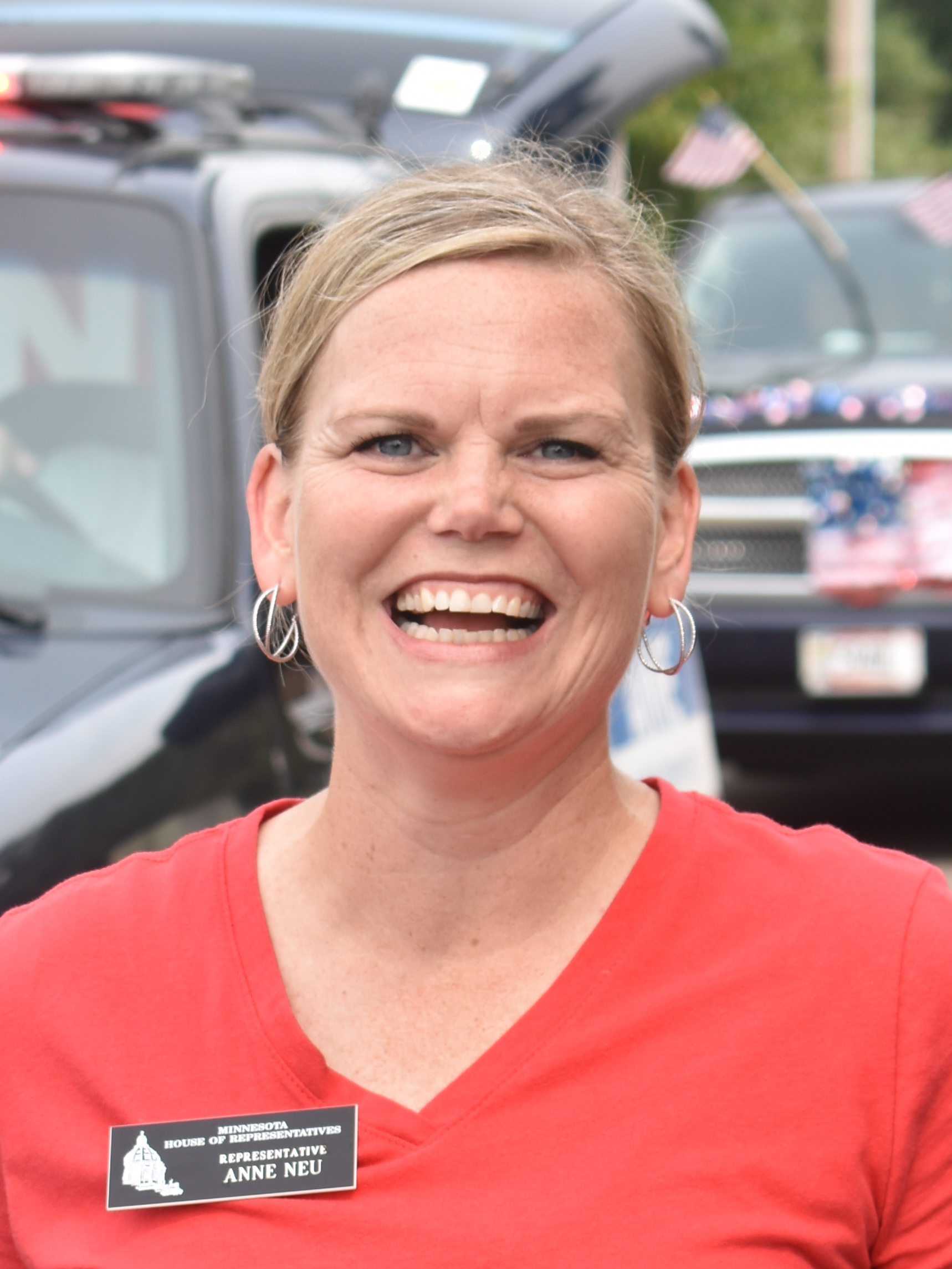

Member of the Minnesota House of Representatives
- In office February 21, 2017 – November 20, 2024
- Preceded by: Bob Barrett
- Succeeded by: Max Rymer
- Constituency: 32B (2017–2022); 28B (2023–present)

Personal details
- Party: Republican
- Spouses: Jon (death 2017) Bowen (m. 2020)
- Children: 5
- Education: Brigham Young University (B.S.)
- Occupation: Home-school educator; Homemaker; Legislator
- Website: Government website Campaign website

Anne E. Neu Brindley is an American politician who served in the Minnesota House of Representatives from 2017 to 2024. A member of the Republican Party of Minnesota, Neu Brindley represented District 28B (District 32B prior to 2020 redistricting) in east-central Minnesota, including the cities of Wyoming, Lindström, Chisago, and North Branch, and parts of Chisago County.

== Early life, education, and career ==
Neu Brindley received her bachelor's degree in family studies from Brigham Young University. She lives in North Branch, Minnesota, and previously served on the North Branch Planning Commission.

Neu Brindley worked as a Republican political strategist before her election to the state legislature. She was Chip Cravaack's campaign manager during his successful bid for Minnesota's 8th congressional district in 2010. The campaign unseated longtime Democrat Jim Oberstar and gave the 8th district of Minnesota its first Republican representative in 79 years. She recruited Pete Hegseth to run for the Republican nomination for the 2012 U.S. Senate election in Minnesota. She worked as the executive director of the Minnesota House Republican Campaign Committee, and helped recruit women candidates to run for legislative office.

== Minnesota House of Representatives ==
Neu Brindley was elected to the Minnesota House of Representatives in a special election on February 14, 2017. She won a full term in 2018 and has been reelected every two years since. Neu Brindley first ran after the Minnesota Supreme Court ruled that three-term Republican incumbent Bob Barrett was ineligible to run because he did not meet residency requirements, triggering a special election.

Neu Brindley served as deputy minority leader from 2019 to 2022 under minority leader Kurt Daudt. She served as the minority lead on the Human Services Finance Committee and also sits on the Health Finance and Policy and Commerce Finance and Policy Committees in the 93rd Legislature.

Neu Brindley did not run for reelection in 2024. She subsequently took a position with the Minnesota Business Partnership as a policy director in August 2024.

=== Political positions ===
==== Appropriations ====
Neu Brindley has said she supports lower taxes and supports wider access to public funding for private and charter schools. She has consistently called for money from the state's budget surplus to be used for tax relief and to cut state taxes on Social Security income. She also supported increasing funds for the state's border-to-border broadband internet program.

==== Health care ====
Neu Brindley has opposed DFL health care proposals, and supports abolishing MNSure, a public health insurance marketplace in the state. She has criticized the Department of Human Services' oversight of money awarded to local agencies and nonprofits. She opposed extending the state's reinsurance program, saying it was "giving bonuses to welfare recipients".

Neu Brindley successfully proposed an amendment to a bill banning conversion therapy in the state to exclude clergy working with members of their congregation. She opposed legislation legalizing marijuana in Minnesota, but added an amendment to the bill around packaging warning labels.

Neu Brindley opposed legislation to allow medically assisted suicide in the state, sharing the story of her husband, who died of ALS. She has supported legislation to increase treatment funding for those living with ALS and their caretakers.

==== Abortion ====
Neu Brindley opposes abortion, calling DFL legislation to codify abortion rights and protection "abhorrent" and "the most extreme position on abortion on the world stage". She has said the Republican Party has tried to ensure "reasonable guardrails" on abortions, but they were rejected by House DFLers.

==== COVID-19 ====
In 2021, Neu Brindley served on a working group to distribute $250 million in federal aid to front-line workers during the COVID-19 pandemic. She advocated for prioritizing front-line medical staff and first responders because they cared for COVID patients. She supported ending Governor Tim Walz's emergency orders regarding the pandemic. She opposed his plan to send one-time stimulus checks in 2022. She voted against bipartisan legislation banning private clubs for lobbyists and legislators at the state capitol.

Neu Brindley opposed mandates for COVID-19 vaccines that "are driving health care worker resignations and layoffs". She signed a letter opposing the Mayo Clinic's vaccine mandate policy for employees, calling it "onerous" to receive a religious exception. The letter suggested that Mayo and other providers would lose support for future legislation. "We will not support state funding for programs like these, or any other funding, for any healthcare facility that fires their employees due to unrealistic vaccine mandate policies."

==== Public safety and crime ====
In 2018, Neu Brindley authored legislation to ban people convicted of a DWI from operating a snowmobile or all-terrain vehicle after an accident killed a child on Chisago Lake.

Neu Brindley opposed changes to state sentencing guidelines that she said would lead to lighter punishments for repeat offenders. She said she was worried about proposals that would increase training, discipline, and civilian oversight for police officers and advocated for delaying implementation of a new standard for justified use of deadly force. She attempted to amend a larger public safety bill to ban cities from disbanding, abolishing, or defunding police departments, and supported requiring reports on the use of mandatory minimum sentences in the state.

===== Gun control =====
Neu Brindley opposes most gun control measures and was rated 92% by the National Rifle Association of America in 2017. She received a perfect score from the Minnesota Gun Owners Caucus in 2019, a gun advocacy group in the state.

==== Election policy ====
Neu Brindley criticized DFL elections bills for their lack of bipartisan support. She opposed a bill to give Minnesota's major political parties more control over candidates running under the party banner by establishing a court process to prevent imposter candidates. Neu Brindley spoke in opposition of legislation that would restore voting rights to felons who are on parole.

== Electoral history ==
2017 Minnesota State House - District 32B Special Election
Party	Candidate	Votes	%
Republican	Anne Neu	3,789	53.22
Democratic (DFL)	Laurie Warner	3,327	46.73
Write-in		3	0.04
Total votes		7,119	100.00
Republican hold			

2018 Minnesota State House - District 32B
Party	Candidate	Votes	%
Republican	Anne Neu (incumbent)	11,031	58.00
Democratic (DFL)	Jeff Peterson	7,971	41.91
Write-in		18	0.09
Total votes		19,020	100.00
Republican hold			

2020 Minnesota State House - District 32B
Party	Candidate	Votes	%
Republican	Anne Neu	15,385	62.13
Democratic (DFL)	Katie Malchow	9,353	37.77
Write-in		26	0.10
Total votes		24,764	100.00
Republican hold			

2022 Minnesota State House - District 32B
Party	Candidate	Votes	%
Republican	Anne Neu Brindley	12,260	62.11
Democratic (DFL)	Katie Malchow	7,471	37.85
Write-in		9	0.05
Total votes		19,740	100.00
Republican hold			

== Personal life ==
Neu Brindley is widowed, and remarried in 2020. Her first husband died from ALS, a rare neurodegenerative disease. She resides in North Branch, Minnesota, and has five children and five stepchildren. She is a member of The Church of Jesus Christ of Latter-day Saints.
