= Minnesota's 32B House of Representatives district =

American legislative district

Minnesota's 32B State House of Representatives district
Representative
Matt Norris; DFL–Blaine
since January 2, 2023 (3 years, 56 days)
- Population (2020): 43,780

District 32B of Minnesota is one of 134 districts in the Minnesota House of Representatives. Located in east-central Minnesota, the district is contained entirely within southern Anoka County. It comprises parts of the city of Blaine as well as the entirety of the city of Lexington. The district is represented by DFLer Matt Norris since 2023.

District 32B is located within Minnesota's 32nd Senate district, alongside House district 32A.

== List of past representatives ==
List of representatives to the Minnesota House of Representatives from district 32B
Member	Party	Residence	Counties represented	Term start	Term end	Ref.
District created
Jack R. Meyer	NP. Con	Columbia Heights	Anoka, Hennepin, Ramsey	January 2, 1967	January 5, 1969	
John S. Kozlak	NP. Lib	St. Anthony	Anoka, Hennepin, Ramsey	January 6, 1969	January 3, 1971	
Spencer J. Sokolowski	NP. Lib	St. Anthony	Anoka, Hennepin, Ramsey	January 4, 1971	December 31, 1972	
Darrel R. Miller	NP. Lib	Pine Island	Dodge, Olmsted	January 1, 1973	January 5, 1975	
Donald L. Friedrich	Ind. Rep.	Rochester	Dodge, Olmsted	January 6, 1975	June 1, 1981	
--Vacant--			Dodge, Olmsted	June 1, 1981	July 27, 1981	
Don Frerichs	Ind. Rep.	Rochester	Dodge, Olmsted	July 27, 1981	January 2, 1983	
Elton Redalen	Ind. Rep.	Fountain	Fillmore, Mower	January 3, 1983	January 10, 1991	
--Vacant--			Fillmore, Mower	January 10, 1991	February 18, 1991	
Greg Davids	Ind. Rep.	Preston	Fillmore, Mower	February 18, 1991	January 3, 1993	
Virgil J. Johnson	Ind. Rep.	Caledonia	Fillmore, Houston, Winona	January 4, 1993	January 5, 1997	
Michelle Rifenberg	Rep.	La Crescent	Fillmore, Houston, Winona	January 6, 1997	January 5, 2003	
Richard W. Stanek	Rep.	Maple Grove	Hennepin	January 6, 2003	January 30, 2003	
--Vacant--			Hennepin	January 30, 2003	March 3, 2003	
Kurt Zellers	Rep.	Maple Grove	Hennepin	March 3, 2003	January 6, 2013	
Bob Barrett	Rep.	Shafer	Chisago	January 7, 2013	January 1, 2017	
--Vacant--			Chisago	January 1, 2017	February 21, 2017	
Anne Neu Brindley	Rep.	North Branch	Chisago	February 21, 2017	January 1, 2023	
Matt Norris	DFL	Blaine	Anoka	January 2, 2023	Current	

== Historical district boundaries ==
From 2013–2023, district 32B covered Wyoming, Lindström, Center City, and portions of the city of North Branch. It was represented first by Republican Bob Barrett from 2013–2017, and then Anne Neu who was elected in a 2017 special election.

Most of the old 32B district became 28B after redistricting.

2013 - 2023
