= Wyoming Township, Minnesota =

Former township in Minnesota, United States

Wyoming Township
- Former township
- Location within the state of Minnesota
- Coordinates: 45°20′0″N 92°57′16″W
- Country: United States
- State: Minnesota
- County: Chisago

Area
  - Total: 32.3 sq mi (83.7 km^{2})
  - Land: 29.7 sq mi (76.8 km^{2})
  - Water: 2.7 sq mi (6.9 km^{2})
- Elevation: 920 ft (280 m)

Population (2000)
  - Total: 4,379
  - Density: 150/sq mi (57/km^{2})
- Time zone: UTC-6 (Central (CST))
  - Summer (DST): UTC-5 (CDT)
- ZIP code: 55092
- Area code: 651
- FIPS code: 27-72040
- GNIS feature ID: 0666065

Wyoming Township is a former township in Chisago County, Minnesota, United States. The population was 4,379 at the 2000 census.

== History ==
Wyoming Township was organized in 1858, and named after the Wyoming Valley, in Pennsylvania. On August 15, 2008, the entire township was annexed in parts to the neighboring cities of Wyoming, Chisago City, and Stacy, thus rendering the township government defunct.

== Geography ==
According to the United States Census Bureau, the township had a total area of 32.3 square miles (83.7 km^{2}), of which 29.7 square miles (76.8 km^{2}) was land and 2.7 square miles (6.9 km^{2}), or 8.20%, was water. It was not listed as a separate entity in the 2010 census.

== Demographics ==
Historical population
Census	Pop.	Note	%±
1860	240		—
1870	522		117.5%
1880	450		−13.8%
1890	580		28.9%
1900	752		29.7%
1910	605		−19.5%
1920	710		17.4%
1930	638		−10.1%
1940	605		−5.2%
1950	566		−6.4%
1960	639		12.9%
1970	1,262		97.5%
1980	2,312		83.2%
1990	2,967		28.3%
2000	4,379		47.6%
U.S. Decennial Census

As of the census of 2000, there were 4,379 people, 1,438 households, and 1,207 families residing in the township. The population density was 147.6 inhabitants per square mile (57.0/km^{2}). There were 1,490 housing units at an average density of 50.2 per square mile (19.4/km^{2}). The racial makeup of the township was 97.44% White, 0.21% African American, 0.30% Native American, 0.55% Asian, 0.32% from other races, and 1.19% from two or more races. Hispanic or Latino of any race were 1.05% of the population.

There were 1,438 households, out of which 48.2% had children under the age of 18 living with them, 75.8% were married couples living together, 4.9% had a female householder with no husband present, and 16.0% were non-families. 11.7% of all households were made up of individuals, and 3.0% had someone living alone who was 65 years of age or older. The average household size was 3.04 and the average family size was 3.30.

In the township the population was spread out, with 32.4% under the age of 18, 6.1% from 18 to 24, 35.3% from 25 to 44, 20.6% from 45 to 64, and 5.7% who were 65 years of age or older. The median age was 34 years. For every 100 females, there were 103.4 males. For every 100 females age 18 and over, there were 102.8 males.

The median income for a household in the township was $67,598, and the median income for a family was $70,313. Males had a median income of $45,065 versus $31,583 for females. The per capita income for the township was $23,204. About 1.4% of families and 1.8% of the population were below the poverty line, including 1.2% of those under age 18 and 7.5% of those age 65 or over.
