= Cornstalk War =

1857 battle in Minnesota Territory

- Part of the American Indian Wars
Date	August 28, 1857
Location	Near modern-day Sunrise Township, Minnesota

Belligerents
United States	Ojibwe

Commanders and leaders
Captain James Starkey	None

Units involved
St. Paul Light Cavalry militia	None

Strength
20-30 soldiers	6 Ojibwe civilians

Casualties and losses
1 killed	1 killed, 1 wounded, 5 total taken as prisoners

The Cornstalk War, also called the Sunrise Expedition^{:74} or Sunrise War,^{:507} was a brief one-day skirmish which occurred on August 28, 1857, in Minnesota Territory. The skirmish took place in a corn field near modern-day Sunrise Township in Chisago County, Minnesota.

== Background ==
During the summer of 1857, several settlers living near Cambridge and Sunrise Township^{:121} began to complain of alleged depredations caused by "several bands of marauding Chippewa Indians".^{:264} Each of these unexplained visits by the Ojibwe typically ended in either robbery or looting.^{:264} During one such incident, several Ojibwe men came to the property of a Mr. Jemmy Burns and ask his wife to feed them.^{:264} The Ojibwe eventually took all the food from Burns' home and burned his hay.^{:264} Burns and his family eventually abandoned their homestead due to a lack of security and a fear of future Ojibwe encounters.^{:264}

A complaint was eventually made to the Governor of Minnesota Territory, Samuel Medary, to put a stop to further Ojibwe raids.^{:265} On August 24, 1857, Medary ordered militia Captain James Starkey of the St. Paul Light Cavalry Company to travel to Isanti County and arrest any Ojibwe participating in raiding, any remaining Ojibwe were to be sent to their reservations.^{:121}^{:507} Starkey's detachment consisted of between 20 and 30 mounted soldiers.^{:268} Starkey's detachment were armed with only a saber and revolver per person.^{:267} Requiring further instructions, Starkey met with Henry M. Rice and Stephen A. Douglas, Rice simply replied to "Do your duty - or show the white feather".^{:267} Starkey's detachment left Saint Paul on August 24, and arrived at Sunrise, Minnesota on August 28.^{:121}

== Battle ==
On August 28, 1857, Starkey's detachment encountered a group of armed Ojibwe on horseback.^{:270-271} Before the Ojibwe could ride anywhere, Starkey ordered his translator, Sergeant McBean, and three others to intercept the Ojibwe and initiate a parley.^{:270-271} Starkey, via the interpreter, stated to the Ojibwe that they were sent by the state government to speak with them about supposed depredations and that they would not be harmed.^{:271} After a few moments the Ojibwe suddenly ran away from Starkey.^{:271}

A small skirmish ensued between Starkey's detachment and the Ojibwe, Starkey brought the skirmish to an end with a charge.^{:273} During the skirmish an Ojibwe man named Sha-go-ba shot Private Donley.^{:273} The Ojibwe subsequently surrendered following the charge.^{:273} In total the Ojibwe killed one soldier, Donley, while only one Ojibwe was killed by the militia.^{:121}^{:57} One Ojibwe was wounded and five in total were taken as prisoners to Saint Paul.^{:121}^{:57}

== Aftermath ==
Sha-go-ba was sent to Chisago County for trial, however, he escaped from imprisonment, the rest of the Ojibwe were released via a writ of habeas corpus.^{:74} Donley was later buried in Oakland Cemetery.^{:10} On May 26, 1980, a memorial service was held at Donley's grave along with the dedication of a formal headstone.^{:10}

The skirmish was later nicknamed the "Cornstalk War" and was deemed unnecessary by much of the public.^{:121}^{:57}
