= 2017 Minnesota House of Representatives district 32B special election =

District 32B special election, 2017
- February 14, 2017

The District 32B seat in the Minnesota House of Representatives
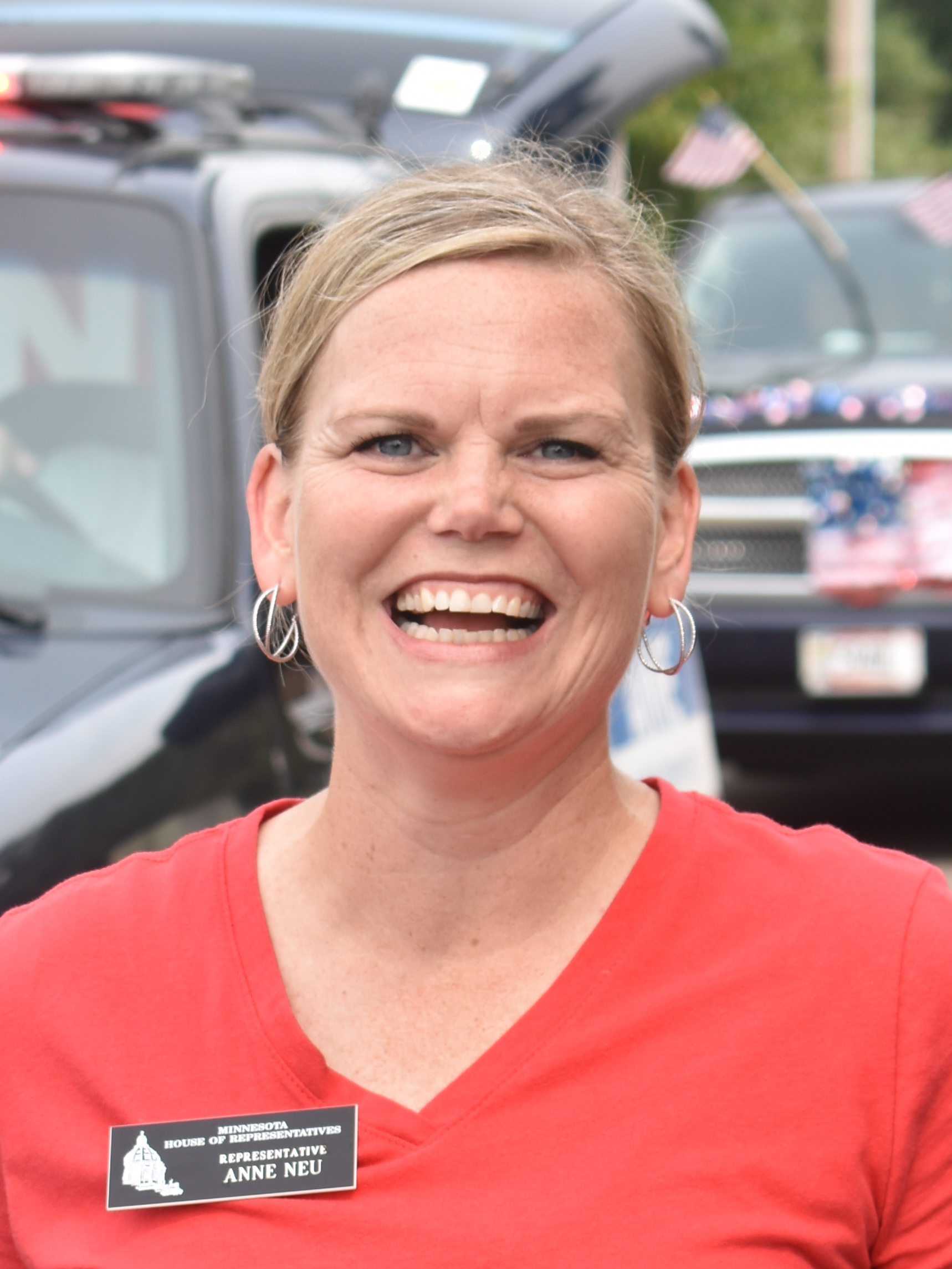
| | | DFL |
| Nominee | Anne Neu Brindley | Laurie Warner |
| Party | Republican | Democratic (DFL) |
| Popular vote | 3,789 | 3,327 |
| Percentage | 53.22% | 46.73% |
- Results by precinct.
Representative before election
Bob Barrett
Republican
Elected Representative
Anne Neu Brindley
Republican

A special election was held in the U.S. state of Minnesota on February 14, 2017, to elect a new representative for District 32B in the Minnesota House of Representatives, caused by a ruling by the Minnesota Supreme Court that incumbent Bob Barrett was ineligible to be a candidate in the general election on November 8, 2016. Anne Neu Brindley, the Republican nominee, won the special election.

== Background ==
On August 26, 2016, Minnesota Second District Court judge George Stephenson found that Republican incumbent Bob Barrett did not reside in District 32B. Candidates for the Minnesota Legislature must reside in the district in which they are running for the preceding six months of the election. The case was referred to the Minnesota Supreme Court and on September 8, 2016, it ruled Barrett ineligible to be a candidate in District 32B. A vacancy in nomination less than 80 days of a general election results in an automatic special election.

== Candidates ==
All the candidates of the general election—except for Barrett—were automatically candidates of the special election. In this case, Laurie Warner was the Minnesota Democratic–Farmer–Labor Party (DFL) nominee. The Republicans selected Anne Neu Brindley to be their nominee.

== Results ==
Minnesota House of Representatives District 32B special election, 2017
| Party | Candidate | Votes | % | ∆pp |
|---|---|---|---|---|
| Republican Party of Minnesota | Anne Neu Brindley | 3,789 | 53.22 | −2.51 |
| Minnesota Democratic–Farmer–Labor Party | Laurie Warner | 3,327 | 46.73 | +2.54 |
| Write-in | N/A | 3 | 0.04 | −0.04 |
| Total | | 7,119 | 100.00 | ±0.00 |

== See also ==
- List of special elections to the Minnesota House of Representatives
