= Sunrise Township, Chisago County, Minnesota =

Township in Minnesota, United States

Sunrise Township
- Township
- Location within the state of Minnesota
- Coordinates: 45°32′32″N 92°53′18″W
- Country: United States
- State: Minnesota
- County: Chisago

Area
  - Total: 45.7 sq mi (118.3 km^{2})
  - Land: 45.0 sq mi (116.6 km^{2})
  - Water: 0.66 sq mi (1.7 km^{2})
- Elevation: 846 ft (258 m)

Population (2020)
  - Total: 2,107
  - Density: 47/sq mi (18.1/km^{2})
- Time zone: UTC-6 (Central (CST))
  - Summer (DST): UTC-5 (CDT)
- ZIP code: 55056
- Area code: 651
- FIPS code: 27-63616
- GNIS feature ID: 0665745
- Website: www.sunrisetownship.com

Sunrise Township is a township in Chisago County, Minnesota, United States. The population was 2,107 at the 2020 census, up from 1,994 in 2010.

== Geography ==
Sunrise Township is located in east-central Chisago County, with its northeast border following the St. Croix River, which is also the state line between Minnesota and Wisconsin. The township is bordered to the west by the cities of Harris and North Branch, to the north by Rushseba Township, to the south by Chisago Lake Township, and to the east of its southern half by Amador Township.

According to the United States Census Bureau, the township has a total area of 45.7 square miles (118.3 km^{2}), of which 45.0 square miles (116.6 km^{2}) is land and 0.66 square miles (1.7 km^{2}), or 1.43%, is water. The Sunrise River crosses the township from south to north, flowing into the St. Croix River. The unincorporated community of Sunrise is located along the river about a mile south of its mouth.

== History ==
In 1852 or 1853, William Holmes, whose birthplace is unknown, established a farm on the Sunrise Prairie, located on the Sunrise River about a mile south of its mouth at the St. Croix River. John A. Brown from Pennsylvania and Patten W. Davis from Virginia started farming in the vicinity in 1853. That same year, Brown and Patten built a road to St. Paul with the help of Henry L. Ingalls and his wife, Lavina. The couple were natives of Connecticut who had migrated to Illinois and then California before arriving in Sunrise. Mrs. Ingalls was likely the first white woman in Sunrise. Also in 1853, a circuit-riding preacher began holding services in the new settlement. His efforts resulted in the establishment of a congregation that remains to the present day as Sunrise Bible Church.

In 1852, John G. Mold arrived and built a sawmill (1854), later establishing a store (1869) and a hotel. By 1855, Brown had also established a store, hotel and sawmill. Brown platted the original town site of Sunrise City, comprising approximately 65 acres (260,000 m^{2}), on June 6, 1856. George S. Frost established a post office the same year. Brown and others platted additional lands in the following years.

In 1857, a large colony of settlers from western New York state came to Sunrise and began establishing farms, homes, and businesses. They included the Collins, Deming, Gwynne, Smith, Starkweather, Wilcox, Wilkes, and Wolleat families. In 1857 the Cornstalk War occurred near Sunrise Township.^{:74}

On October 26, 1858, Sunrise was organized as a township. The unincorporated community of Sunrise is still located on the plat of Sunrise City. However, it was never incorporated into a city but remains under township jurisdiction.

== Demographics ==
Historical population
| Census | Pop. | Note | %± |
|---|---|---|---|
| 1860 | 202 | | — |
| 1870 | 240 | | 18.8% |
| 1880 | 271 | | 12.9% |
| 1890 | 626 | | 131.0% |
| 1900 | 890 | | 42.2% |
| 1910 | 939 | | 5.5% |
| 1920 | 1,019 | | 8.5% |
| 1930 | 856 | | −16.0% |
| 1940 | 818 | | −4.4% |
| 1950 | 646 | | −21.0% |
| 1960 | 630 | | −2.5% |
| 1970 | 828 | | 31.4% |
| 1980 | 1,001 | | 20.9% |
| 1990 | 1,125 | | 12.4% |
| 2000 | 1,594 | | 41.7% |
| 2010 | 1,994 | | 25.1% |
| 2020 | 2,107 | | 5.7% |
U.S. Decennial Census

As of the census of 2000, there were 1,594 people, 538 households, and 444 families residing in the township. The population density was 35.2 inhabitants per square mile (13.6/km^{2}). There were 568 housing units at an average density of 12.5/sq mi (4.8/km^{2}). The racial makeup of the township was 97.80% White, 0.38% African American, 0.50% Native American, 0.38% Asian, 0.06% from other races, and 0.88% from two or more races. Hispanic or Latino of any race were 0.38% of the population.

There were 538 households, out of which 40.9% had children under the age of 18 living with them, 74.3% were married couples living together, 3.2% had a female householder with no husband present, and 17.3% were non-families. 12.6% of all households were made up of individuals, and 3.9% had someone living alone who was 65 years of age or older. The average household size was 2.96 and the average family size was 3.22.

In the township the population was spread out, with 30.1% under the age of 18, 7.2% from 18 to 24, 31.6% from 25 to 44, 24.3% from 45 to 64, and 6.9% who were 65 years of age or older. The median age was 35 years. For every 100 females, there were 105.7 males. For every 100 females age 18 and over, there were 106.9 males.

The median income for a household in the township was $60,223, and the median income for a family was $60,721. Males had a median income of $40,820 versus $25,074 for females. The per capita income for the township was $22,336. About 3.3% of families and 4.2% of the population were below the poverty line, including 3.4% of those under age 18 and 5.3% of those age 65 or over.

== Notable people ==
- Jerald C. Anderson, dentist and politician, born in Sunrise Township.
- Frank Orren Lowden (1861-1943), served as the 25th Governor of Illinois from 1917-1921, born in Sunrise Township before moving to Hardin County, Iowa.
- Richard Widmark, actor, born in Sunrise Township
