= James Starkey (Minnesota politician) =

English-American businessman, soldier, politician

- Ambrotype of Starkey c. 1858

Member of the Minnesota House of Representatives from the 2nd district
- In office December 2, 1857 – December 6, 1859

Personal details
- Born: James Richard Starkey; 1818 United Kingdom of Great Britain and Ireland
- Died: August 28, 1892 (aged 73–74) Winnipeg, Canada
- Resting place: Oakland Cemetery, Saint Paul, Minnesota, U.S.

James Starkey (1818 – August 28, 1892) was an English-American businessman, soldier, politician, and early citizen of Columbus, Minnesota. Starkey served a single term in the Minnesota Legislature where he was the pro tempore speaker of the Minnesota House.

== Early life ==
Starkey was born in 1818 in England. Starkey emigrated to the United States in 1849 and moved to Minnesota Territory in 1850, choosing to settle in Saint Paul, Minnesota.^{:231} In 1855 Starkey platted and began to build the city of Columbus, Minnesota.^{:76,161} Starkey owned a saw mill in Columbus which he used to employ and encourage various settlers to build homesteads in the region.^{:161} Starkey also owned a hotel which cost an estimated $10,000 to construct.^{:161} Starkey eventually moved to Saint Paul by 1857 after failing to establish Columbus as a city.^{:162}

== Military service ==
Starkey began his military service in 1855 as the captain of the St. Paul Light Cavalry, a mounted militia.^{:231} Starkey's militia company were deployed to Chisago County, Minnesota in August 1857 in order to quell a supposed disturbance by the Ojibwe near the Sunrise River.^{:507} Starkey skirmished with the Ojibwe before arresting several Ojibwe men who were taken to Saint Paul.^{:507}

During the American Civil War Starkey commanded the Chisago Rangers militia in 1861.^{:231} During the Dakota War of 1862 Starkey raised a cavalry company for militia service but did not fight in the conflict.^{:231} Starkey later joined the 1st Minnesota Cavalry Regiment and served as a captain in Company M. Starkey was later accused of false mustering, or fraudulently enlisting servicemembers into United States military service.^{:207} Starkey was found guilty on several counts, cashiered, and denied further service in the United States military.^{:210}

== Political career ==
Starkey was the assistant secretary of Minnesota Territory from 1850 to 1853.^{:230} Starkey was later elected to serve in the Minnesota House on October 13, 1857, representing the 2nd House district in the 1st Minnesota Legislature. During his term in the Minnesota House Starkey was a member of the ways and means committee and was the chairman of the banks committee. Starkey was also elected as the pro tempore speaker of the Minnesota House.^{:230} Starkey served during the House's temporary organization from December 2, 1857, until House speaker was officially sworn in on December 3, 1857.

Starkey also served as a county commissioner for Anoka County, Minnesota.^{:231} In 1873 Starkey established Saint Paul's first city sewer department.^{:232}

== Later life and death ==
Following his short career in politics, Starkey surveyed land for the building of Minnesota's first railroad line from Saint Paul to Lake Superior.^{:231} Starkey later worked as a contractor for the Lake Superior and Mississippi Railroad, later called the St. Paul and Duluth Railroad.^{:231}

Starkey died on Sunday August 28, 1892, in Winnipeg.
