= Linda Runbeck =

American politician

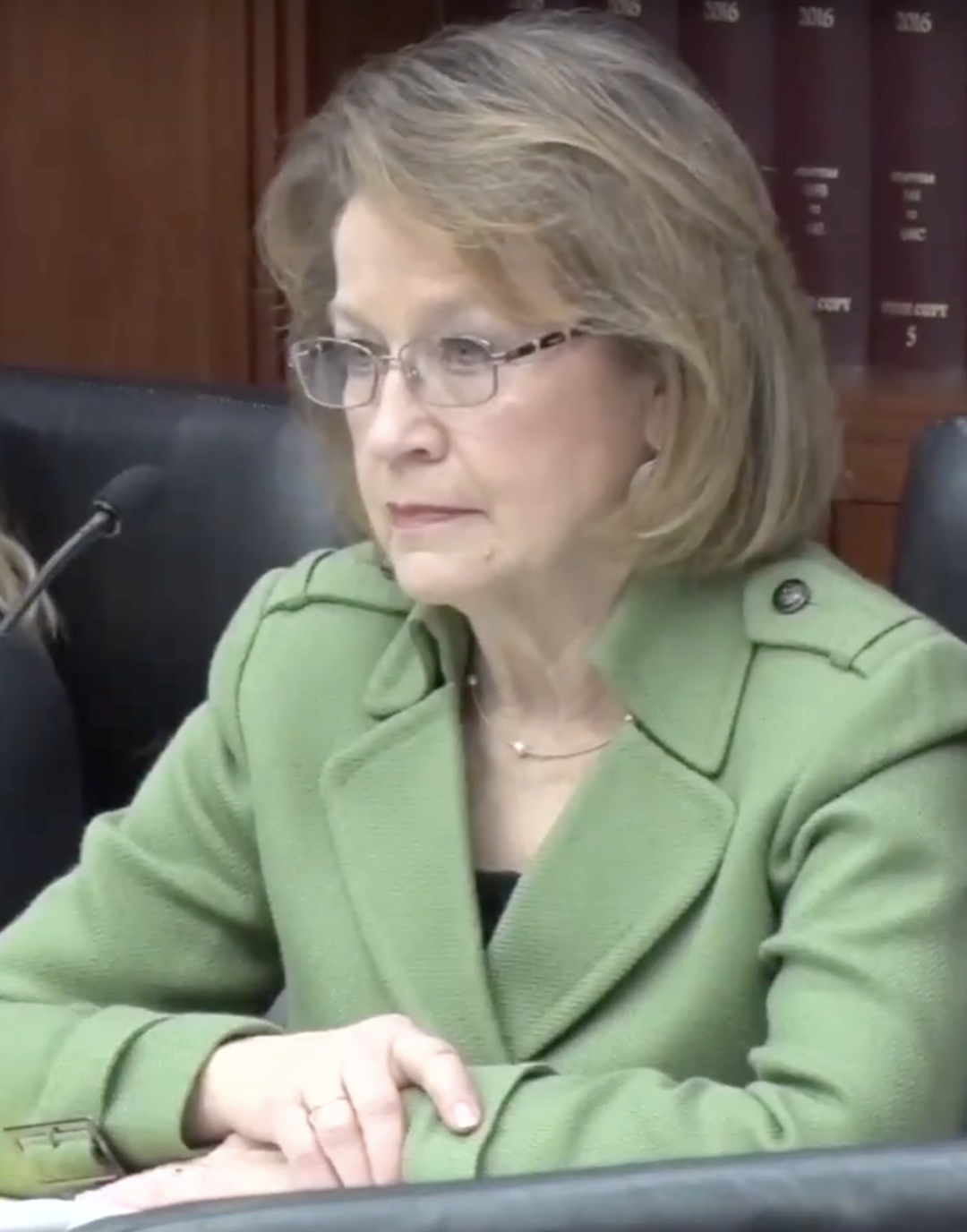

Member of the Minnesota House of Representatives
- In office January 4, 2011 – January 6, 2021
- Preceded by: Paul Gardner
- Succeeded by: Donald Raleigh
- Constituency: 38A (2013–2021); 53A (2011–2013)
- In office February 8, 1989 – January 4, 1993
- Preceded by: Gordon Voss
- Succeeded by: District redrawn
- Constituency: 52A district

Member of the Minnesota Senate from the 53rd district district
- In office January 5, 1993 – January 2, 2001
- Preceded by: New district
- Succeeded by: Madelyn Reiter

Personal details
- Born: June 11, 1946 (age 80)
- Party: Republican
- Education: Bethel College (BA)

Linda Runbeck (born June 11, 1946) is an American politician who was a member of the Minnesota House of Representatives from 1989 to 1993 and again from 2011 to 2021. She was also a member of the Minnesota Senate from 1993 to 2001.

== Career ==
Prior to serving in the Minnesota Legislature, she was a member of the Circle Pines City Council. She was president of the Taxpayers League of Minnesota, served on the Northwest YMCA’s Advisory Board, receiving its Distinguished Leader Award in 2007, and was also development director at the Minnesota Free Market Institute. She has also been a frequent guest on Almanac, a weekly public affairs television show in Minnesota.

She previously worked as director of advertising for County Seat Stores and vice president for Dahlberg Incorporated, a hearing aid manufacturer. She later owned a Miracle-Ear hearing aid franchise.

=== Minnesota Legislature ===
Runbeck served in the Minnesota Senate, representing District 53 from 1993 to 2001, leaving to make an unsuccessful run for the U.S. House of Representatives in Minnesota's 4th District in 2000 against Betty McCollum. She also served in the House previously, representing the old District 52A from 1989 to 1993 after winning a 1989 special election held after Rep. Gordon Voss resigned to accept an appointment by Governor Rudy Perpich as chief administrator of the Minnesota Metropolitan Waste Control Commission.

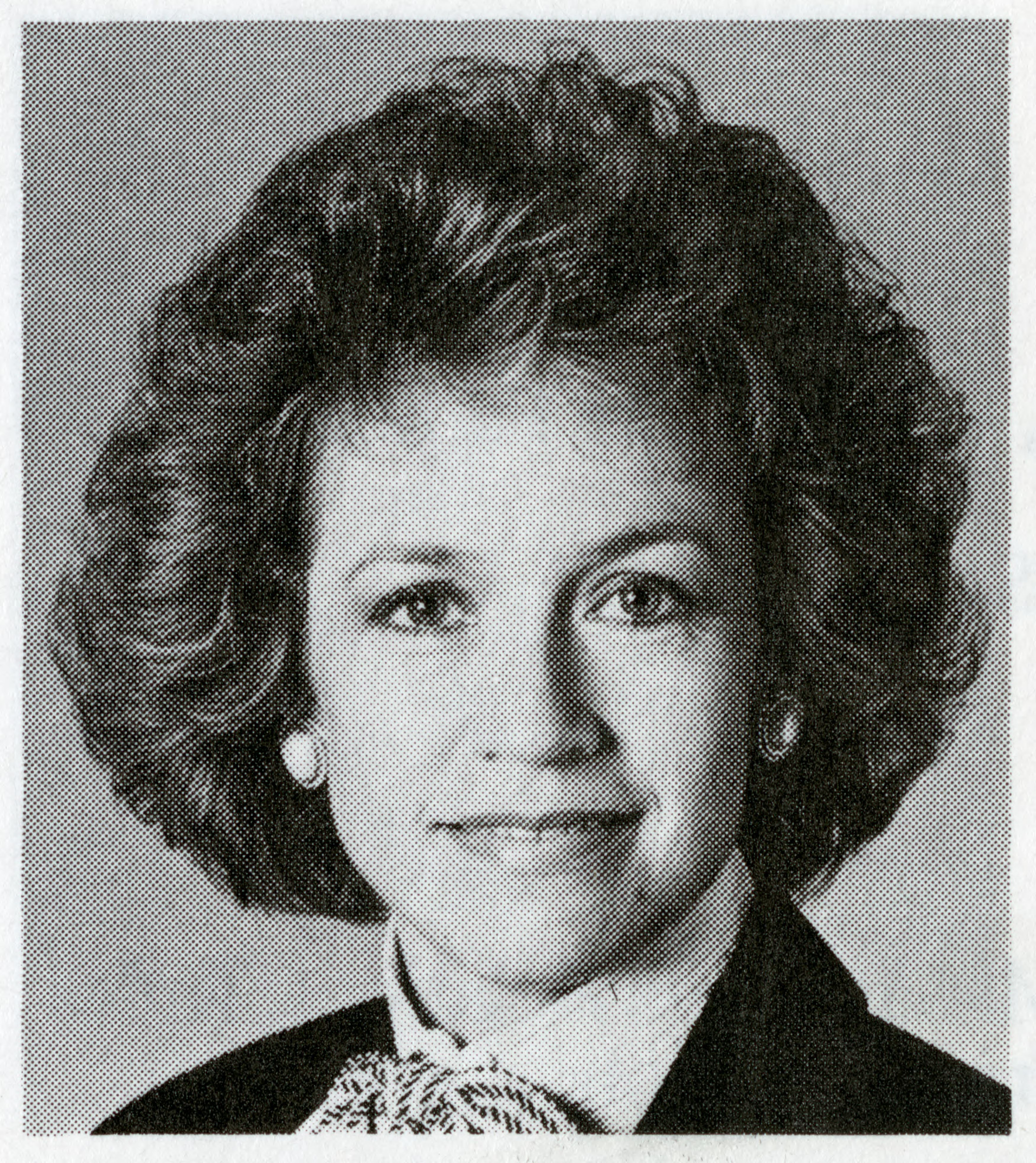
Representative Linda Runbeck, 1991-1992 Legislative Session, Minnesota Legislature.

Runbeck was elected to the Minnesota House of Representatives in 2010 and re-elected in 2012, 2014, 2016, and 2018. She did not seek re-election in 2020 and was succeeded by Donald Raleigh.

== Political positions ==
Runbeck is a conservative Republican, receiving a lifetime score of 89% from the American Conservative Union. She supported the 2012 amendments to the Minnesota State Constitution that intended to ban gay marriage and to require a photo ID to vote. Both of these proposals were later rejected by voters.

Runbeck opposes abortion and voted to ban them past 20 weeks. She has voted to reduce funding for public transportation. She supports lifting the moratorium on nuclear power in the state.
