= Sunrise, Minnesota =

Unincorporated community in Minnesota, United States

Sunrise
- Unincorporated community
- Location within Minnesota Location within the United States
- Coordinates: 45°32′49″N 92°51′18″W
- Country: United States
- State: Minnesota
- County: Chisago County
- Township: Sunrise Township
- Elevation: 814 ft (248 m)
- Time zone: UTC-6 (Central (CST))
  - Summer (DST): UTC-5 (CDT)
- ZIP code: 55056
- Area code: 651
- GNIS feature ID: 652840

Sunrise is an unincorporated community in Sunrise Township, Chisago County, Minnesota, United States. The community is located east-northeast of North Branch at the junction of Chisago County Road 9 and River Road. The Sunrise River flows through the community. Nearby places include North Branch, Harris, and Almelund. ZIP codes 55056 (North Branch) and 55032 (Harris) meet near Sunrise. As the crow flies, Sunrise is located ~1.35 miles (2.17 km) south of the Minnesota–Wisconsin border along the St. Croix River.

== History ==
The first settlement was made at Sunrise c. 1853. The name Sunrise is an English translation of the native Ojibwe language name. Sunrise contained a post office from 1856 until 1954.

== Notable people ==
- Jerald C. Anderson, dentist and Minnesota State Senator was born in Sunrise.
- Frank Orren Lowden, Governor of Illinois, was born in Sunrise.
- Richard Widmark, actor, was born in Sunrise.
