= Donald Raleigh (politician) =

American politician and businessman

Member of the Minnesota House of Representatives from the 38A district
- In office January 5, 2021 – January 3, 2023
- Preceded by: Linda Runbeck
- Succeeded by: Matt Norris (new district)

Personal details
- Born: October 9, 1965 (age 60)
- Party: Republican
- Spouse: Marnie
- Children: 4
- Education: American Military University (BA)

Military service
- Branch/service: United States Army
- Years of service: 1984–1992
- Unit: 3rd U.S. Infantry Regiment

Donald Raleigh (born October 9, 1965) is an American politician and businessman who served as a member of the Minnesota House of Representatives from the 38A district from 2021 to 2023. Elected in November 2020, he assumed office on January 5, 2021. He lost re-election to a new District 32B in 2022.

== Education ==
Raleigh graduated from Osceola High School in Polk County, Wisconsin in 1984. He earned a Bachelor of Arts degree in emergency and disaster management from American Military University.

== Career ==
Raleigh served in the United States Army from 1984 to 1992, where he was a member of the 3rd U.S. Infantry Regiment. From 1992 to 1994, he worked as a salesman for InaCOMP, a technology company based in Southfield, Michigan. He was also a salesman for Entex Industries, Syntegra, Control Data, BT Group, and Creative Internet Solutions. He later worked as a consultant at Control Data. In 2002, he founded Evolve Systems, a marketing agency. Raleigh also owns MYGUN.com LLC and Monitoring Management Solutions, Inc.

Raleigh was elected to the Minnesota House of Representatives in November 2020 and assumed office on January 5, 2021.

On September 8, 2022, a Minnesota Reformer article revealed that Raleigh was on the membership roster of the Oath Keepers, a group designated by the Anti-Defamation League as an "anti-government extremist group." In an interview, Raleigh stated that he "disavows the group and its beliefs, and that he only signed up for a membership years ago as part of a project to conduct market research on organizations targeting veterans."

== Personal life ==
Raleigh and his wife, Marnie, have four children and live in Blaine, Minnesota.

Raleigh was detained at the Minneapolis/St. Paul Airport in 2016 while en route to Washington D.C. after a loaded gun was discovered in his carry-on luggage. Raleigh later entered a guilty plea after being charged with presenting a prohibited item at the security screening area.

Raleigh has been linked to a series of web comics authored “by Dan & Don” originally posted on the violent cartoons depicting the murder of various people by guns. The cartoons were originally posted on MYGUN.com. The dozens of illustrations show a stick figure shooting and murdering a variety of victims, including kids, people of color, a Girl Scout selling cookies, military members, environmentalists, a blind person, an overweight person, a Jehovah Witness and a DMV employee. Donald Raleigh has never publicly addressed the cartoons, however, a MN Republican spokesperson denied the cartoons were drawn by Donald Raleigh and asserted the drawings were by his younger brother, Dan.
