= Green Lake (Chisago City, Minnesota) =

Lake of the United States of America

- Location within Minnesota
- Location: Chisago County, Minnesota
- Coordinates: 45.343°N 92.898°W
- Surface area: 1,809 acres (732 ha)
- Max. depth: 32 ft (9.8 m)

Green Lake is a lake in Chisago City, Minnesota, United States. This lake is sometimes also referred to as "Big Green Lake" because it is connected to Little Green Lake by a channel. Green Lake was named from the fact its waters are green from the high algae content.

== Physical features ==
Green Lake has an area of 1,809 acres (732 ha). It is the largest lake in the Chisago City area and it is 32 feet (9.8 m) deep at its deepest point. The average water clarity is about 9.6 feet (2.9 m). It is connected by a channel to Little Green Lake. The main public boat access is located off of County Road 23 in Chisago City. There is a smaller public boat access on Little Green, off Green Lake Avenue, which can also be used to access Green Lake. Green Lake has three recognizable sections. "Little Green" is on the north end of the body of water. The main and biggest portion is in the middle. The south end has many bays and vegetation.

== Development ==
The shoreline of Green Lake is very developed. It has approximately 335 homes and one regional park. The regional park located on Green Lake is Camp Ojiketa. This park is 70 acres (28 ha) of trees, trails and a few cabins available for rent. It is the newest and largest park in Chisago City. Ojiketa used to be a Camp Fire Girls camp, but is now a venue that can be rented out for weddings, family gatherings, or other events.

== Fishing ==
Green Lake specializes in walleye, bluegill, and crappie. Other common fish that are found in this lake are lake sturgeon, largemouth bass, and northern pike. Every year, Green Lake hosts a carp festival in which members of the contest go out late at night to catch as many carp as they can. Green Lake also hosts a bass tournament during Chisago City's annual "Ki-Chi-Saga Days" festival.

There are many different kinds of fish that can be found in Green Lake. A 2011 sample of the lake turned up the following species: black bullhead, black crappie, bluegill, bowfin (dogfish), brown bullhead, common carp, golden shiner, green sunfish, hybrid sunfish, largemouth bass, northern pike, pumpkinseed, walleye, yellow bullhead, yellow perch. The DNR annually stocks walleye in Green Lake. According to the DNR, "walleye management includes annual fingerling stocking at a rate of one pound per littoral acre (1,228 pounds [557 kg]) and a 17-inch [43 cm] minimum harvest regulation. Walleye abundance is within the normal range for this lake type, although survey gill net catch rates have decreased since peaking in 1986. A recent management change from biennial to annual fingerling stocking may help to boost walleye numbers; however, yellow perch, an important prey for walleye, have been declining as well. A 17-inch [43 cm] minimum length regulation is in effect for walleye, but nearly half the walleye caught in gill nets in the 2011 assessment were 17 inches [43 cm] or larger.”
