= 1912 United States presidential election in Minnesota =

- November 5, 1912
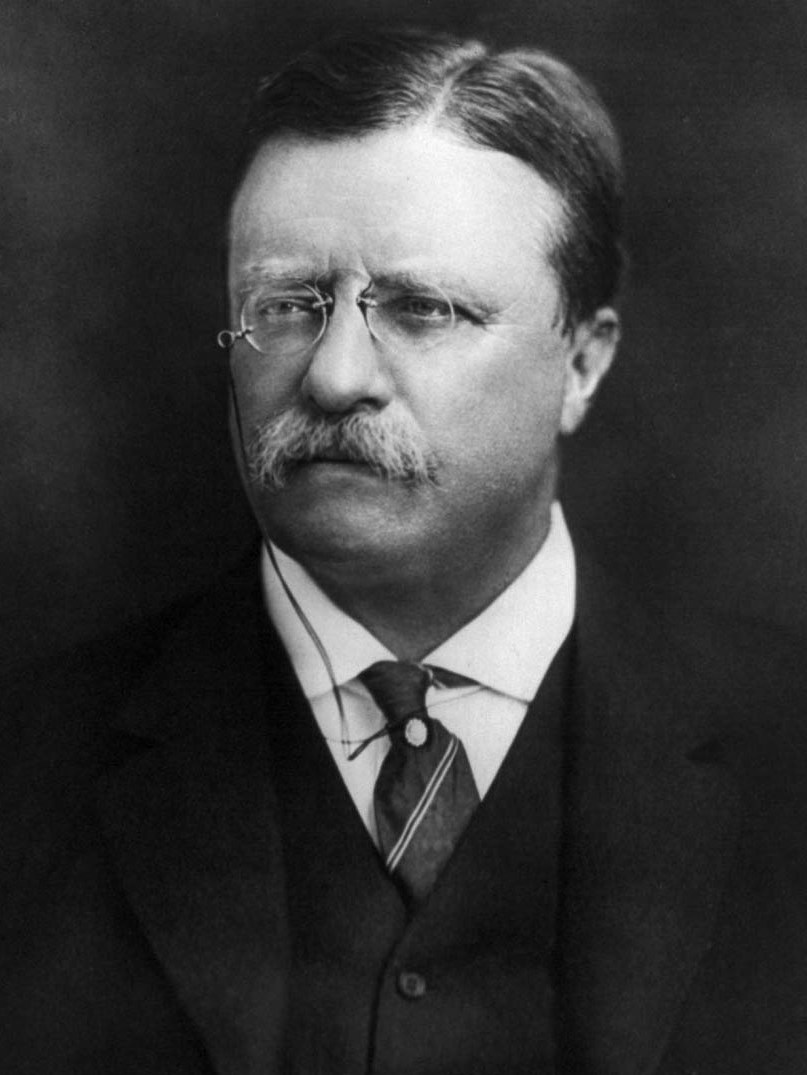

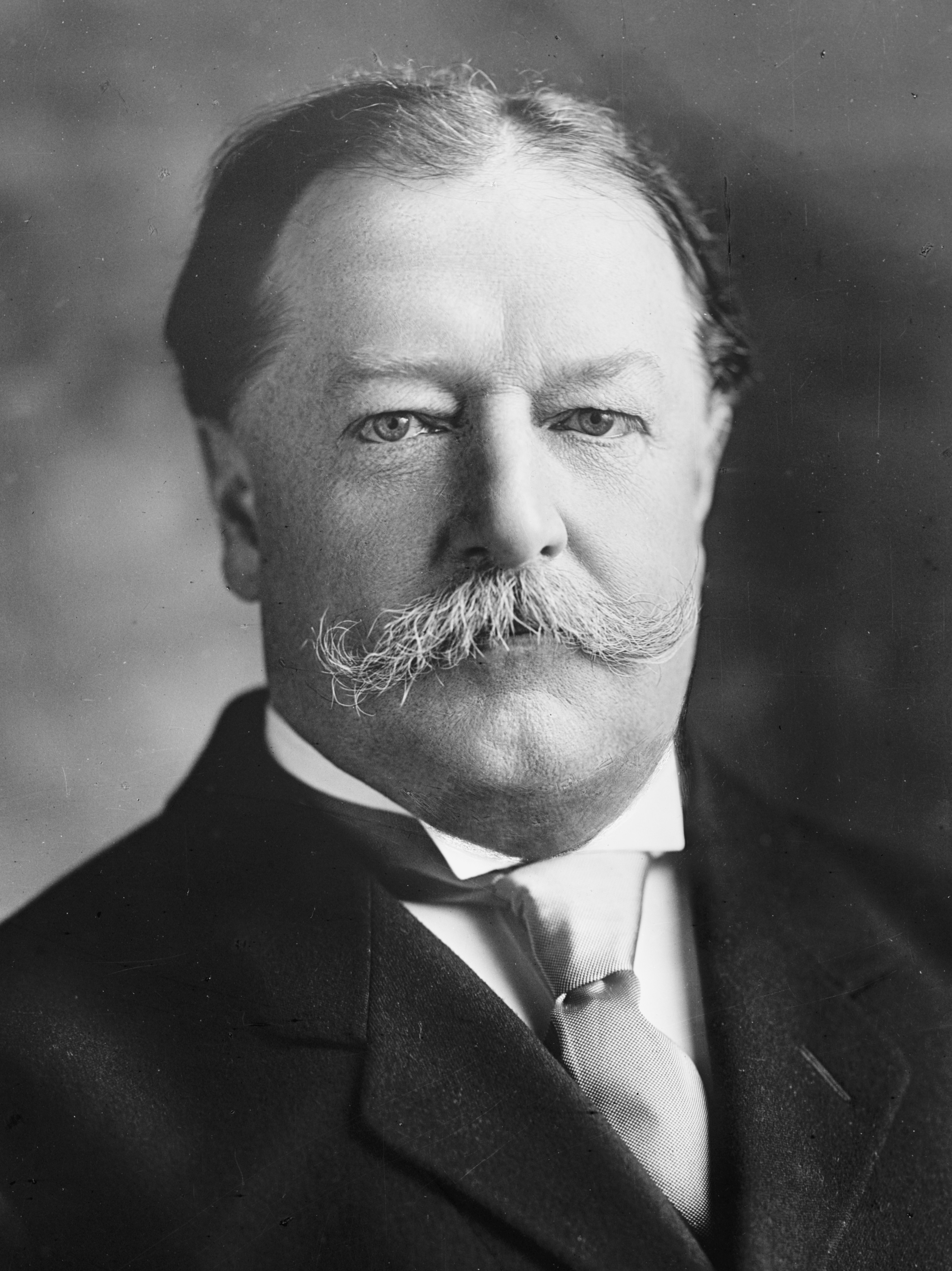

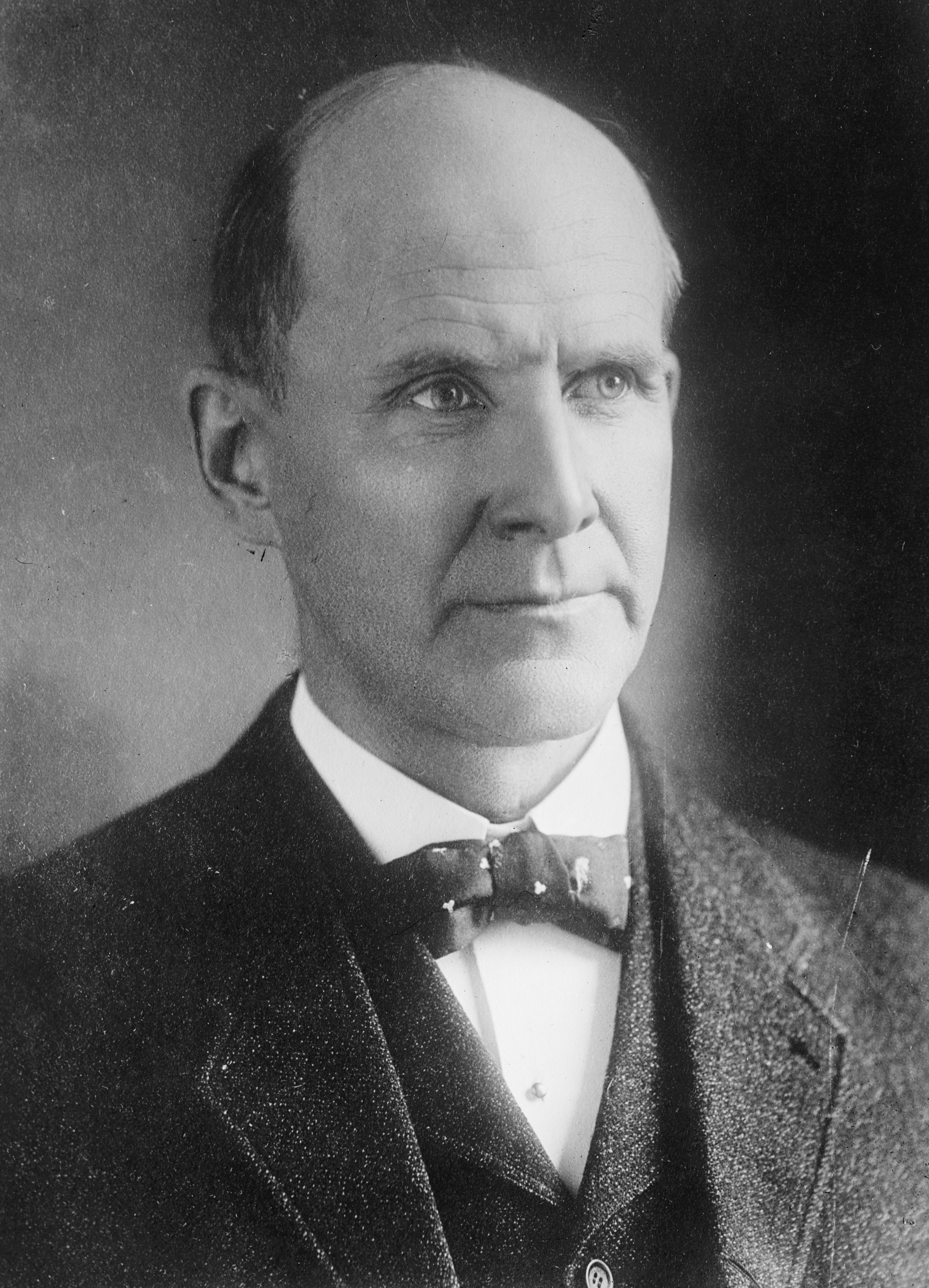
Nominee	Theodore Roosevelt	Woodrow Wilson
Party	Progressive	Democratic
Home state	New York	New Jersey
Running mate	Hiram Johnson	Thomas R. Marshall
Electoral vote	12	0
Popular vote	125,856	106,426
Percentage	37.66%	31.84%
Nominee	William Howard Taft	Eugene V. Debs
Party	Republican	Socialist
Home state	Ohio	Indiana
Running mate	Nicholas Murray Butler	Emil Seidel
Electoral vote	0	0
Popular vote	64,334	27,505
Percentage	19.25%	8.23%
County results
Roosevelt
20–30%
30–40%
40–50%
50–60%
60–70%
Wilson
30–40%
40–50%
50–60%
Debs
20–30%
30–40%
President before election
William Howard Taft
Republican
Elected President
Woodrow Wilson
Democratic

The 1912 United States presidential election in Minnesota took place on November 5, 1912, as part of the 1912 United States presidential election. Minnesota voters chose 12 electors to the Electoral College, which selected the president and vice president.

Minnesota was won by the Progressive candidate, former President Theodore Roosevelt, won the state over the Democratic candidate, New Jersey governor Woodrow Wilson, by a margin of 19,430 votes, or 5.82%, while Republican incumbent President William Howard Taft came in third, with just 19.25% of the vote, and perennial Socialist candidate Eugene V. Debs came in fourth while winning the votes of 8.23% of Minnesota voters. Nationally, Wilson won the election, with 435 electoral votes and a landslide 14.44% lead over Roosevelt in the popular vote, while Taft finished third, with 23.17% of the vote, and Debs won a personal record 5.99% of the national popular vote.

Nationally, the 1912 election was the first United States presidential election since 1860 in which there were four candidates who each won more than five percent of the popular vote, and the first since 1852 in which the ticket of a party other than the Democratic and Republican parties finished second (as well as the last, as of 2020). It was the only presidential election in American history in which an incumbent president faced both his immediate predecessor and his immediate successor in the general election. As a result of the 1912 election, Woodrow Wilson became the second of only two Democrats elected president between 1860 and 1932. It was also the first presidential election in which all 48 of the contiguous United States participated.

The 1912 election was the first presidential election held since statehood in which the Republican ticket lost in Minnesota, and the only presidential election in which a party other than the Democratic and Republican parties won Minnesota's electoral votes. It was the only presidential election since statehood in which the Republican ticket failed to carry a single county in Minnesota, and the only presidential election in which the Republican ticket finished less than second in the state. Taft's 19.25% still ranks as the lowest percentage of the popular vote any Republican presidential nominee has ever won in Minnesota.

The 1912 election also marked the high water point for the Socialist Party of America, both nationally and in Minnesota. No Socialist Party candidate—before or since—has ever won a higher percentage of the national popular vote than Debs did in 1912, and no Socialist Party candidate for any office has won a higher percentage of the statewide vote in Minnesota. In Minnesota, Debs carried two counties (Beltrami and Lake); nationally, he carried two more (Crawford County, Kansas and Burke County, North Dakota).

Minnesota would not go against the Republican Party in a presidential election again until Democrat Franklin D. Roosevelt won the state in 1932.

With 37.66% of the popular vote, Minnesota would prove to be Roosevelt's fourth-strongest state in terms of popular vote percentage in the 1912 election after South Dakota, California and Michigan.

== Results ==
1912 United States presidential election in Minnesota
Party	Candidate	Votes	Percentage	Electoral votes
Progressive	Theodore Roosevelt	125,856	37.66%	12
Democratic	Woodrow Wilson	106,426	31.84%	0
Republican	William Howard Taft (incumbent)	64,334	19.25%	0
Socialist	Eugene V. Debs	27,505	8.23%	0
Prohibition	Eugene W. Chafin	7,886	2.36%	0
Socialist Labor	Arthur E. Reimer	2,212	0.66%	0
Totals		334,219	100.00%	12

=== Results By County ===
1912 United States Presidential Election in Minnesota (by county)
County	Theodore Roosevelt Progressive		Woodrow Wilson Democratic		William Howard Taft Republican		Eugene V. Debs Socialist		Eugene W. Chafin Prohibition		Arthur E. Reimer Socialist Labor		Margin		Total votes cast
County	#	%	#	%	#	%	#	%	#	%	#	%	#	%	Total votes cast
Aitkin	842	40.42%	413	19.83%	362	17.38%	378	18.15%	72	3.46%	16	0.77%	429	20.59%	2,083
Anoka	729	35.06%	591	28.43%	562	27.03%	90	4.33%	92	4.43%	15	0.72%	138	6.63%	2,079
Becker	1,350	44.45%	732	24.10%	509	16.76%	257	8.46%	165	5.43%	24	0.79%	618	20.35%	3,037
Beltrami	794	26.25%	790	26.12%	490	16.20%	871	28.79%	39	1.29%	41	1.36%	-77 (Note: In this county where Debs ran first ahead of Roosevelt, Wilson, and Taft, margin given is Debs vote minus Roosevelt vote, while percentage given is Debs percentage minus Roosevelt percentage.)	-2.54%	3,025
Benton	728	37.92%	562	29.27%	468	24.38%	117	6.09%	24	1.25%	21	1.09%	166	8.65%	1,920
Big Stone	591	35.26%	677	40.39%	244	14.56%	98	5.85%	62	3.70%	4	0.24%	-86	-5.13%	1,676
Blue Earth	1,579	29.84%	2,025	38.27%	1,344	25.40%	184	3.48%	141	2.66%	18	0.34%	-446	-8.43%	5,291
Brown	1,359	42.99%	943	29.83%	472	14.93%	348	11.01%	21	0.66%	18	0.57%	416	13.16%	3,161
Carlton	1,115	43.10%	631	24.39%	283	10.94%	449	17.36%	89	3.44%	20	0.77%	484	18.71%	2,587
Carver	933	33.78%	1,008	36.50%	742	26.86%	41	1.48%	30	1.09%	8	0.29%	-75	-2.72%	2,762
Cass	693	33.05%	565	26.94%	431	20.55%	341	16.26%	51	2.43%	16	0.76%	128	6.11%	2,097
Chippewa	1,133	42.56%	870	32.68%	412	15.48%	122	4.58%	116	4.36%	9	0.34%	263	9.88%	2,662
Chisago	1,649	63.42%	435	16.73%	346	13.31%	128	4.92%	32	1.23%	10	0.38%	1,214	46.69%	2,600
Clay	1,300	42.60%	942	30.87%	549	17.99%	169	5.54%	79	2.59%	13	0.43%	358	11.73%	3,052
Clearwater	566	51.69%	123	11.23%	125	11.42%	234	21.37%	33	3.01%	14	1.28%	332 (Note: In this county where Debs ran second ahead of Wilson and Taft, margin given is Roosevelt vote minus Debs vote and percentage given is Roosevelt percentage minus Debs percentage.)	30.32%	1,095
Cook	172	49.43%	65	18.68%	30	8.62%	61	17.53%	15	4.31%	5	1.44%	107	30.75%	348
Cottonwood	1,032	51.17%	511	25.33%	325	16.11%	94	4.66%	39	1.93%	16	0.79%	521	25.84%	2,017
Crow Wing	1,079	32.73%	709	21.50%	691	20.96%	736	22.32%	56	1.70%	26	0.79%	343 (Note: In this county where Debs ran second ahead of Wilson and Taft, margin given is Roosevelt vote minus Debs vote and percentage given is Roosevelt percentage minus Debs percentage.)	10.41%	3,297
Dakota	1,608	37.48%	1,777	41.42%	609	14.20%	196	4.57%	87	2.03%	13	0.30%	-169	-3.94%	4,290
Dodge	897	44.56%	543	26.97%	470	23.35%	40	2.93%	59	1.99%	4	0.20%	354	17.59%	2,013
Douglas	1,379	47.36%	793	27.23%	435	14.94%	161	5.53%	125	4.29%	19	0.65%	586	20.13%	2,912
Faribault	1,724	51.36%	919	27.38%	393	11.71%	77	2.29%	233	6.94%	11	0.33%	805	23.98%	3,357
Fillmore	1,888	42.33%	990	22.20%	1,169	26.21%	133	2.98%	266	5.96%	14	0.31%	719 (Note: In this county where Taft ran second ahead of Wilson, margin given is Roosevelt vote minus Taft vote and percentage given is Roosevelt percentage minus Taft percentage.)	16.12%	4,460
Freeborn	1,902	48.23%	880	22.31%	672	17.04%	240	6.09%	234	5.93%	16	0.41%	1,022	25.92%	3,944
Goodhue	2,844	49.56%	1,405	24.48%	1,051	18.31%	185	3.22%	233	4.06%	21	0.37%	1,439	25.08%	5,739
Grant	952	61.03%	381	24.42%	146	9.36%	24	1.54%	52	3.33%	5	0.32%	571	36.61%	1,560
Hennepin	11,489	23.69%	15,530	32.02%	14,379	29.64%	5,820	12.00%	668	1.38%	619	1.28%	-1,151 (Note: In this county where Taft ran second ahead of Roosevelt, margin given is Wilson vote minus Taft vote and percentage given is Wilson percentage minus Taft percentage.)	-2.38%	48,505
Houston	1,278	46.05%	762	27.46%	659	23.75%	27	0.97%	43	1.55%	6	0.22%	516	18.59%	2,775
Hubbard	503	29.71%	450	26.58%	359	21.20%	285	16.83%	73	4.31%	23	1.36%	53	3.13%	1,693
Isanti	1,025	47.45%	333	15.42%	314	14.54%	369	17.08%	112	5.19%	7	0.32%	656 (Note: In this county where Debs ran second ahead of Taft and Wilson, margin given is Roosevelt vote minus Debs vote and percentage given is Roosevelt percentage minus Debs percentage.)	30.37%	2,160
Itasca	880	32.73%	699	25.99%	446	16.59%	578	21.49%	59	2.19%	27	1.00%	181	6.74%	2,689
Jackson	1,234	45.18%	913	33.43%	468	17.14%	57	2.09%	43	1.57%	16	0.59%	321	11.75%	2,731
Kanabec	498	38.82%	270	21.04%	218	16.99%	258	20.11%	29	2.26%	10	0.78%	228	17.78%	1,283
Kandiyohi	1,668	50.27%	855	25.77%	484	14.59%	196	5.91%	98	2.95%	17	0.51%	813	24.50%	3,318
Kittson	770	53.10%	362	24.97%	185	12.76%	80	5.52%	46	3.17%	7	0.48%	408	28.13%	1,450
Koochiching	522	27.59%	638	33.72%	239	12.63%	460	24.31%	16	0.85%	17	0.90%	-116	-6.13%	1,892
Lac Qui Parle	1,405	55.36%	608	23.96%	343	13.51%	68	2.68%	107	4.22%	7	0.28%	797	31.40%	2,538
Lake	369	29.15%	195	15.40%	182	14.38%	466	36.81%	46	3.63%	8	0.63%	-97 (Note: In this county where Debs ran first ahead of Roosevelt, Wilson, and Taft, margin given is Debs vote minus Roosevelt vote and percentage given is Debs percentage minus Roosevelt percentage.)	-7.66%	1,266
Le Sueur	952	26.79%	1,488	41.87%	886	24.93%	133	3.74%	79	2.22%	16	0.45%	-536	-15.08%	3,554
Lincoln	666	41.37%	548	34.04%	264	16.40%	62	3.85%	62	3.85%	8	0.50%	118	7.33%	1,610
Lyon	1,167	39.71%	1,068	36.34%	460	15.65%	128	4.36%	100	3.40%	16	0.54%	99	3.37%	2,939
McLeod	891	30.98%	1,225	42.59%	655	22.77%	34	1.18%	59	2.05%	12	0.42%	-334	-11.61%	2,876
Mahnomen	154	24.64%	293	46.88%	68	10.88%	98	15.68%	10	1.60%	2	0.32%	-139	-22.24%	625
Marshall	1,721	58.74%	567	19.35%	331	11.30%	197	6.72%	99	3.38%	15	0.51%	1,154	39.39%	2,930
Martin	1,347	40.69%	1,141	34.47%	578	17.46%	98	2.96%	140	4.23%	6	0.18%	206	6.22%	3,310
Meeker	1,458	45.07%	1,099	33.97%	560	17.31%	67	2.07%	43	1.33%	8	0.25%	359	11.10%	3,235
Mille Lacs	751	37.46%	449	22.39%	392	19.55%	329	16.41%	65	3.24%	19	0.95%	302	15.07%	2,005
Morrison	1,327	36.41%	1,341	36.79%	699	19.18%	223	6.12%	41	1.12%	14	0.38%	-14	-0.38%	3,645
Mower	1,371	32.82%	1,228	29.40%	1,321	31.63%	159	3.81%	82	1.96%	16	0.38%	50 (Note: In this county where Taft ran second ahead of Wilson, margin given is Roosevelt vote minus Taft vote and percentage given is Roosevelt percentage minus Taft percentage.)	1.19%	4,177
Murray	958	42.43%	775	34.32%	388	17.18%	72	3.19%	57	2.52%	8	0.35%	183	8.11%	2,258
Nicollet	825	34.01%	929	38.29%	525	21.64%	70	2.89%	53	2.18%	24	0.99%	-104	-4.28%	2,426
Nobles	1,122	38.54%	994	34.15%	605	20.78%	119	4.09%	62	2.13%	9	0.31%	128	4.39%	2,911
Norman	983	44.04%	510	22.85%	329	14.74%	252	11.29%	146	6.54%	12	0.54%	473	21.19%	2,232
Olmsted	1,467	37.11%	1,542	39.01%	720	18.21%	93	2.35%	112	2.83%	19	0.48%	-75	-1.90%	3,953
Otter Tail	3,168	48.40%	1,739	26.57%	755	11.53%	578	8.83%	263	4.02%	43	2.66%	1,429	21.83%	6,546
Pennington	784	41.88%	423	22.60%	244	13.03%	343	18.32%	67	3.58%	11	0.59%	361	19.28%	1,872
Pine	1,281	42.56%	777	25.81%	513	17.04%	345	11.46%	71	2.36%	23	0.76%	504	16.75%	3,010
Pipestone	675	40.56%	505	30.35%	301	18.09%	118	7.09%	56	3.37%	9	0.54%	170	10.21%	1,664
Polk	2,326	40.47%	1,662	28.92%	735	12.79%	789	13.73%	199	3.46%	36	0.63%	664	11.55%	5,747
Pope	1,283	56.30%	443	19.44%	379	16.63%	40	1.76%	126	5.53%	8	0.35%	840	36.86%	2,279
Ramsey	12,426	38.41%	12,431	38.43%	4,109	12.70%	2,942	9.09%	275	0.85%	167	0.52%	-5	-0.02%	32,350
Red Lake	226	24.33%	374	40.26%	259	27.88%	54	5.81%	11	1.18%	5	0.54%	-115 (Note: In this county where Taft ran second ahead of Roosevelt, margin given is Wilson vote minus Taft vote and percentage given is Wilson percentage minus Taft percentage.)	-12.38%	929
Redwood	1,291	40.67%	1,126	35.48%	542	17.08%	139	4.38%	59	1.86%	17	0.54%	165	5.19%	3,174
Renville	1,712	43.87%	1,310	33.57%	703	18.02%	99	2.54%	72	1.85%	6	0.15%	402	10.30%	3,902
Rice	1,765	38.39%	1,613	35.09%	1,020	22.19%	78	1.70%	101	2.20%	20	0.44%	152	3.30%	4,597
Rock	757	41.82%	466	25.75%	463	25.58%	72	3.98%	47	2.60%	5	0.28%	291	16.07%	1,810
Roseau	859	44.79%	299	15.59%	278	14.49%	426	22.21%	41	2.14%	15	0.78%	433 (Note: In this county where Debs ran second ahead of Wilson and Taft, margin given is Roosevelt vote minus Debs vote and percentage given is Roosevelt percentage minus Debs percentage.)	22.58%	1,918
St. Louis	8,480	40.62%	5,124	24.54%	3,881	18.59%	2,853	13.67%	420	2.01%	120	0.57%	3,356	16.08%	20,878
Scott	596	26.12%	1,172	51.36%	462	20.25%	25	1.10%	23	1.01%	4	0.18%	-576	-25.24%	2,282
Sherburne	676	44.53%	360	23.72%	335	22.07%	70	4.61%	64	4.22%	13	0.86%	316	20.81%	1,518
Sibley	1,139	45.04%	890	35.19%	383	15.14%	62	2.45%	43	1.70%	12	0.47%	249	9.85%	2,529
Stearns	1,682	26.14%	3,317	51.55%	1,134	17.63%	182	2.83%	92	1.43%	27	0.42%	-1,635	-25.41%	6,434
Steele	1,105	34.53%	1,294	40.44%	651	20.34%	59	1.84%	84	2.63%	7	0.22%	-189	-5.91%	3,200
Stevens	628	38.20%	640	38.93%	286	17.40%	33	2.01%	52	3.16%	5	0.30%	-12	-0.73%	1,644
Swift	1,038	39.72%	937	35.86%	442	16.92%	100	3.83%	88	3.37%	8	0.31%	101	3.86%	2,613
Todd	1,098	29.37%	1,068	28.56%	1,038	27.76%	404	10.81%	107	2.86%	24	0.64%	30	0.81%	3,739
Traverse	541	42.70%	561	44.28%	131	10.34%	16	1.26%	13	1.03%	5	0.39%	-20	-1.58%	1,267
Wabasha	1,068	31.26%	1,422	41.62%	797	23.32%	67	1.96%	56	1.64%	7	0.20%	-354	-10.36%	3,417
Wadena	515	38.72%	336	25.26%	278	20.90%	167	12.56%	28	2.11%	6	0.45%	179	13.46%	1,330
Waseca	940	34.89%	1,062	39.42%	553	20.53%	63	2.34%	62	2.30%	14	0.52%	-122	-4.53%	2,694
Washington	2,078	49.21%	1,289	30.52%	581	13.76%	202	4.78%	57	1.35%	16	0.38%	789	18.69%	4,223
Watonwan	1,139	54.81%	618	29.74%	254	12.22%	33	1.59%	30	1.44%	4	0.19%	521	25.07%	2,078
Wilkin	561	38.85%	586	40.58%	209	14.47%	56	3.88%	30	2.08%	2	0.14%	-25	-1.73%	1,444
Winona	1,676	26.60%	3,004	47.68%	1,042	16.54%	338	5.37%	62	0.98%	178	2.83%	-1,328	-21.08%	6,300
Wright	1,917	44.49%	1,333	30.94%	837	19.42%	101	2.34%	106	2.46%	15	0.35%	584	13.55%	4,309
Yellow Medicine	1,203	48.67%	737	29.81%	352	14.24%	79	3.20%	94	3.80%	7	0.28%	466	18.86%	2,472
Totals	125,856	37.66%	106,426	31.84%	64,334	19.25%	27,505	8.23%	7,886	2.36%	2,212	0.66%	19,430	5.82%	334,219

== See also ==
- United States presidential elections in Minnesota
