= Jeff Dabe =

American arm wrestler (born June 1963)

- Born: June 1963 (age 63)
- Other names: Popeye; Anaconda
- Occupations: Heavy equipment operator Arm wrestler
- Known for: Large hands and arms
- Height: 1.75 m (5 ft 9 in)

Jeff Dabe (born June 1963) is an American heavy machine operator and professional arm wrestler, noted for his oversized upper extremities.

== Biography ==
Dabe was born in June 1963. He is noted for his oversized limbs, which he has had since childhood. In 2022, his forearm measured a girth of 20 inches (51 cm) and his ring finger of 5 inches (13 cm). His limb size is notably not a consequence of gigantism or elephantiasis.

Dabe has been arm wrestling since 1981, and was given the nickname Popeye early in his arm-wrestling endeavors. In 1996, Dabe injured his right elbow in an arm-wrestling match and stopped competing. In 2012, at the age of 48, he returned to the sport, wrestling only with his left arm and becoming the Minnesota state arm wrestling champion.

He is the 2021 International Federation of Arm Wrestling's world champion. Outside of arm wrestling, he works as a heavy equipment operator and runs a hobby farm.

== Personal life ==
Dabe lives in Stacy, Minnesota. Jeff and his wife Gina have three children.
