= Jerald C. Anderson =

American politician

Jerald Clayton Anderson (April 4, 1934 – January 7, 2014) was an American dentist and politician.

Born in Sunrise, Minnesota, Anderson received his bachelors and dentistry degrees from the University of Minnesota. He then served in the United States Army in the dentist corps 1959–1961. Anderson served in the Minnesota State Senate in 1971–1980 as a Democrat. He died in Oak Park Heights, Minnesota.
