= Stacy, Minnesota =

City in Minnesota, United States

- City
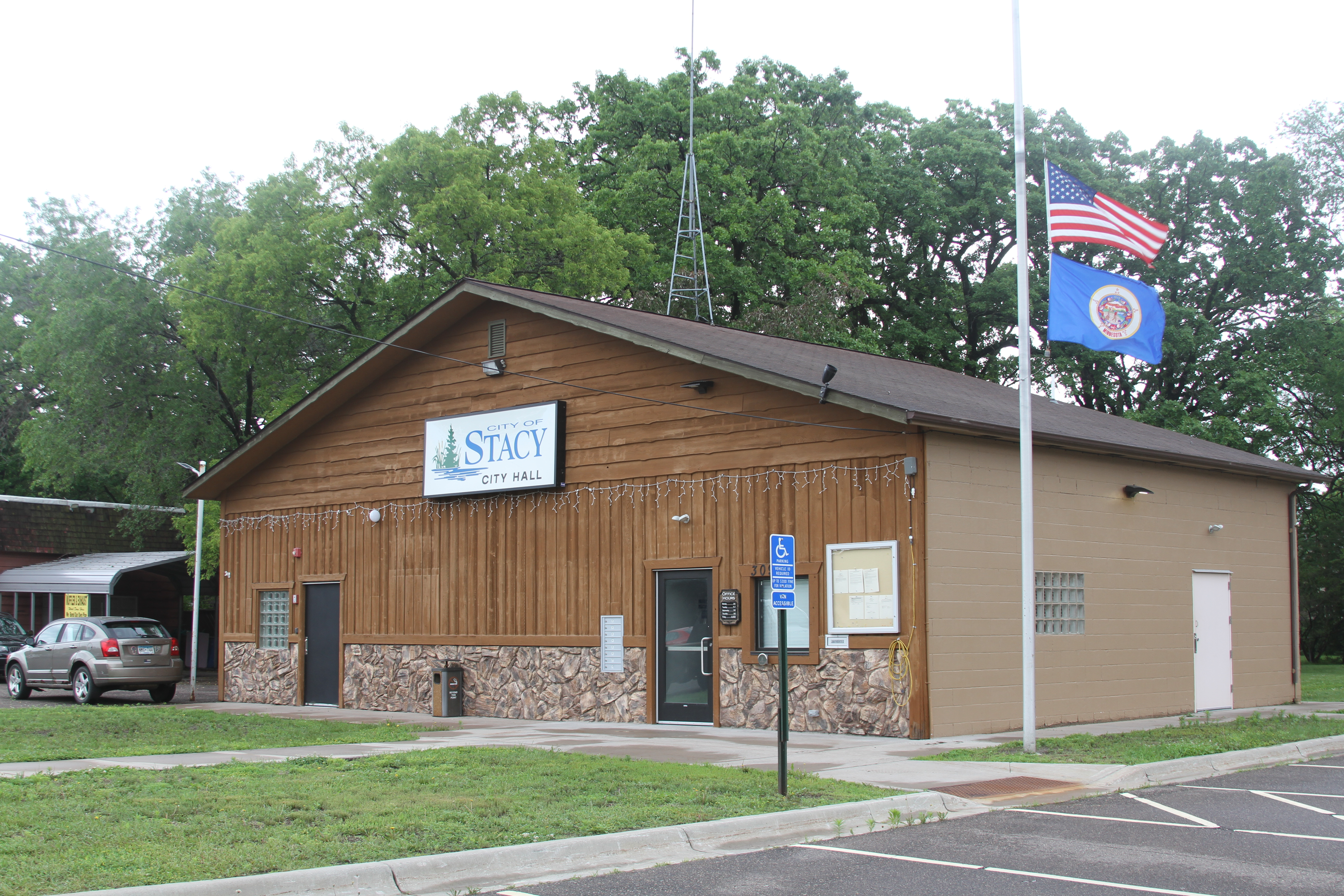
- Stacy City Hall
- Interactive map of Stacy, Minnesota
- Location within Minnesota Location within the United States
- Coordinates: 45.4230°N 92.9703°W
- Country: United States
- State: Minnesota
- County: Chisago
- Founded: 1875
- Incorporated: April 13, 1923
- Founder: Dr. Stacy B. Collins

Government
  - Type: Mayor–council
  - Mayor: Mark Utecht
  - Councilmembers: Tim Sawatzky; Dennis Thieling; Jeff Barrett; Mike Hoppe

Area
  - Total: 30.140 sq mi (78.062 km^{2})
  - Land: 28.509 sq mi (73.838 km^{2})
  - Water: 1.631 sq mi (4.225 km^{2}) 5.41%
- Elevation: 899 ft (274 m)

Population (2020)
  - Total: 1,703
  - Estimate (2025): 4,367
  - Density: 59.74/sq mi (23.06/km^{2})
- Time zone: UTC−6 (Central (CST))
  - Summer (DST): UTC−5 (CDT)
- ZIP Code: 55079
- Area code: 651
- FIPS code: 27-62320
- GNIS feature ID: 2395946
- Website: stacymn.gov

Stacy is a city in Chisago County, Minnesota, United States, along the Sunrise River. The population was 1,703 as of the 2020 census, and was estimated at 4,367 in 2025. The population increased substantially with the annexation of a significant portion of the surrounding Lent Township, effective on December 29, 2023.

Interstate 35 serves as a main route for the community.

== History ==
A post office called Stacy has been in operation since 1873. Stacy was laid out in 1875, and named for Dr. Stacy B. Collins, an early settler.

== Geography ==
According to the United States Census Bureau, the city has a total area of 30.140 square miles (78.06 km^{2}), of which 28.509 square miles (73.84 km^{2}) is land and 1.631 square miles (4.22 km^{2}) (2.60%) is water.

== Demographics ==
Historical population
Census	Pop.	Note	%±
1930	143		—
1940	138		−3.5%
1950	150		8.7%
1960	211		40.7%
1970	278		31.8%
1980	996		258.3%
1990	1,081		8.5%
2000	1,278		18.2%
2010	1,456		13.9%
2020	1,703		17.0%
2025 (est.)	4,367		156.4%
U.S. Decennial Census; 2020 Census

=== 2020 census ===
As of the 2020 census, Stacy had a population of 1,703. The median age was 35.5 years. 27.2% of residents were under the age of 18 and 9.9% of residents were 65 years of age or older. For every 100 females there were 96.7 males, and for every 100 females age 18 and over there were 100.8 males age 18 and over.

0.0% of residents lived in urban areas, while 100.0% lived in rural areas.

There were 639 households in Stacy, of which 36.5% had children under the age of 18 living in them. Of all households, 47.9% were married-couple households, 18.0% were households with a male householder and no spouse or partner present, and 21.6% were households with a female householder and no spouse or partner present. About 22.1% of all households were made up of individuals and 5.5% had someone living alone who was 65 years of age or older.

There were 654 housing units, of which 2.3% were vacant. The homeowner vacancy rate was 0.0% and the rental vacancy rate was 6.1%.

Racial composition as of the 2020 census
Race	Number	Percent
White	1,504	88.3%
Black or African American	24	1.4%
American Indian and Alaska Native	6	0.4%
Asian	31	1.8%
Native Hawaiian and Other Pacific Islander	0	0.0%
Some other race	38	2.2%
Two or more races	100	5.9%
Hispanic or Latino (of any race)	102	6.0%

=== 2010 census ===
As of the 2010 census, there were 1,456 people, 548 households, and 379 families living in the city. The population density was 414.8 inhabitants per square mile (160.2/km^{2}). There were 591 housing units at an average density of 168.4 units per square mile (65.0 units/km^{2}). The racial makeup of the city was 94.4% White, 0.8% African American, 0.3% Native American, 1.4% Asian, 0.1% Pacific Islander, 0.5% from other races, and 2.4% from two or more races. Hispanic or Latino of any race were 1.7% of the population.

There were 548 households, of which 39.8% had children under the age of 18 living with them, 46.9% were married couples living together, 12.6% had a female householder with no husband present, 9.7% had a male householder with no wife present, and 30.8% were non-families. 23.5% of all households were made up of individuals, and 9.1% had someone living alone who was 65 years of age or older. The average household size was 2.66 and the average family size was 3.08.

The median age in the city was 33.4 years. 27.3% of residents were under the age of 18; 7% were between the ages of 18 and 24; 32.4% were from 25 to 44; 24.6% were from 45 to 64; and 8.7% were 65 years of age or older. The gender makeup of the city was 52.7% male and 47.3% female.

=== 2000 census ===
As of the 2000 census, there were 1,278 people, 466 households and 326 families living in the city. The population density was 1,159.0 inhabitants per square mile (447.5/km^{2}). There were 474 housing units at an average density of 429.8 units per square mile (165.9 units/km^{2}). The racial makeup of the city was 96.79% White, 0.55% African American, 1.25% Native American, 0.16% Asian, 0.16% from other races, and 1.10% from two or more races. Hispanic or Latino of any race were 0.94% of the population.

There were 466 households, of which 42.1% had children under the age of 18 living with them, 48.9% were married couples living together, 13.5% had a female householder with no husband present, and 30.0% were non-families. 22.5% of all households were made up of individuals, and 5.2% had someone living alone who was 65 years of age or older. The average household size was 2.74 and the average family size was 3.23.

Age distribution was 32.6% under the age of 18, 9.3% from 18 to 24, 36.9% from 25 to 44, 16.0% from 45 to 64, and 5.2% who were 65 years of age or older. The median age was 29 years. For every 100 females, there were 109.2 males. For every 100 females age 18 and over, there were 108.2 males.

The median household income was $42,026, and the median family income was $45,288. Males had a median income of $36,029 versus $25,192 for females. The per capita income for the city was $16,893. About 7.9% of families and 9.4% of the population were below the poverty line, including 12.5% of those under age 18 and 11.8% of those age 65 or over.

== Notable people ==
- Jeff Dabe – arm wrestler
- Hunter Miska – ice hockey goaltender currently playing for the Colorado Avalanche.
