= Chisago City, Minnesota =

City in Minnesota, United States

Chisago City
- City
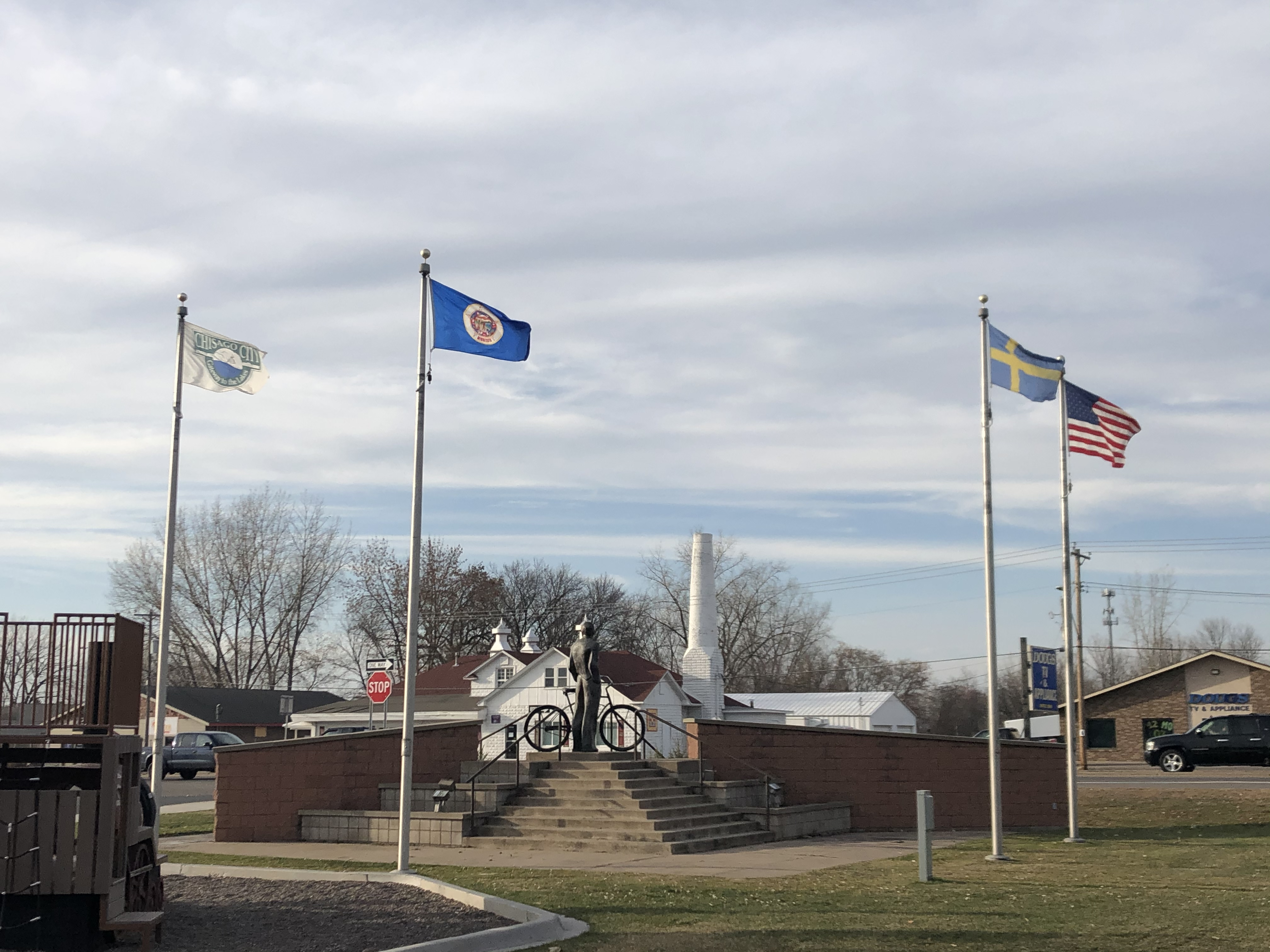
- Statue of Vilhelm Moberg in downtown Chisago City
- Motto: "Gateway to the Lakes"
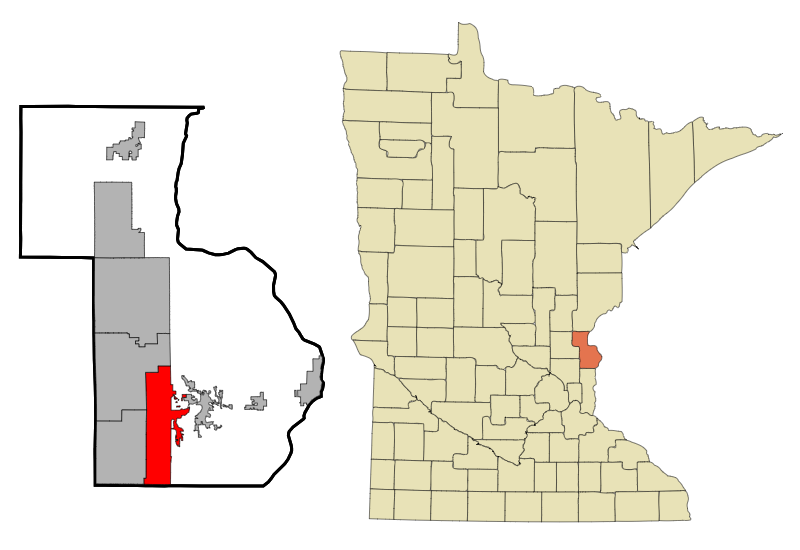
- Location of Chisago City within Chisago County, Minnesota
- Coordinates: 45°22′25″N 92°53′24″W
- Country: United States
- State: Minnesota
- County: Chisago

Area
  - Total: 14.78 sq mi (38.28 km^{2})
  - Land: 12.56 sq mi (32.53 km^{2})
  - Water: 2.22 sq mi (5.75 km^{2})
- Elevation: 919 ft (280 m)

Population (2020)
  - Total: 5,558
  - Density: 442.5/sq mi (170.85/km^{2})
- Time zone: UTC-6 (Central (CST))
  - Summer (DST): UTC-5 (CDT)
- ZIP code: 55013
- Area code: 651
- FIPS code: 27-11350
- GNIS feature ID: 663797
- Website: www.ci.chisago.mn.us

Chisago City (/ʃɪˈsɑːɡoʊ/ shih-SAH-goh) is a city in Chisago County, Minnesota, United States, approximately 35 miles northeast of downtown Minneapolis–Saint Paul. The population was 5,558 at the 2020 census.

The city is between the twin lakes of Chisago Lake and Green Lake, and is part of the Chisago lakes region.

== Geography ==
According to the United States Census Bureau, the city has a total area of 14.99 square miles (38.82 km^{2}), of which 12.53 square miles (32.45 km^{2}) is land and 2.46 square miles (6.37 km^{2}) is water.

=== Climate ===
Climate data for Chisago City, Minnesota (1991–2020 normals, extremes 1958–present)
Month	Jan	Feb	Mar	Apr	May	Jun	Jul	Aug	Sep	Oct	Nov	Dec	Year
Record high °F (°C)	57 (14)	65 (18)	81 (27)	91 (33)	95 (35)	100 (38)	104 (40)	102 (39)	96 (36)	91 (33)	76 (24)	65 (18)	104 (40)
Mean daily maximum °F (°C)	24.2 (−4.3)	30.1 (−1.1)	43.0 (6.1)	57.6 (14.2)	69.8 (21.0)	79.1 (26.2)	83.4 (28.6)	81.5 (27.5)	73.7 (23.2)	59.9 (15.5)	43.0 (6.1)	28.9 (−1.7)	56.2 (13.4)
Daily mean °F (°C)	13.6 (−10.2)	18.2 (−7.7)	31.0 (−0.6)	45.1 (7.3)	57.6 (14.2)	67.6 (19.8)	71.8 (22.1)	69.9 (21.1)	61.9 (16.6)	48.5 (9.2)	33.3 (0.7)	19.8 (−6.8)	44.9 (7.2)
Mean daily minimum °F (°C)	3.0 (−16.1)	6.3 (−14.3)	18.9 (−7.3)	32.6 (0.3)	45.4 (7.4)	56.0 (13.3)	60.2 (15.7)	58.3 (14.6)	50.0 (10.0)	37.1 (2.8)	23.6 (−4.7)	10.7 (−11.8)	33.5 (0.8)
Record low °F (°C)	−38 (−39)	−37 (−38)	−32 (−36)	2 (−17)	21 (−6)	33 (1)	42 (6)	41 (5)	25 (−4)	13 (−11)	−20 (−29)	−37 (−38)	−38 (−39)
Average precipitation inches (mm)	0.88 (22)	0.90 (23)	1.70 (43)	3.00 (76)	4.36 (111)	4.48 (114)	4.70 (119)	4.03 (102)	3.18 (81)	2.91 (74)	1.80 (46)	1.17 (30)	33.11 (841)
Average snowfall inches (cm)	9.6 (24)	9.3 (24)	9.2 (23)	3.7 (9.4)	0.0 (0.0)	0.0 (0.0)	0.0 (0.0)	0.0 (0.0)	0.0 (0.0)	0.6 (1.5)	7.4 (19)	11.8 (30)	51.6 (131)
Average precipitation days (≥ 0.01 in)	8.2	6.0	7.5	9.7	11.6	12.5	10.8	10.3	9.8	10.1	6.9	8.3	111.7
Average snowy days (≥ 0.1 in)	9.6	6.4	4.8	1.9	0.0	0.0	0.0	0.0	0.0	0.5	4.2	8.4	35.8
Source: NOAA

== Infrastructure ==
=== Transportation ===
U.S. Highway 8 serves as a main route for the community.

The Northern Pacific's Taylor Falls Branch served Chisago City. The line was eventually abandoned.

== History ==
Chisago City was founded in May 1857 by Anders Swenson, a Swedish immigrant from Småland. He was born in 1817 and came to America in 1850. The city took its name from Chisago Lake.

During 1852 only a few settlers arrived. John Smith came from Örtofta in the spring of that year. Ahead of him, he declared, were only five settlers at Chisago Lake.

During 1853-54 a substantial number of Swedish immigrants arrived, most of them from Kronoberg County. Most of the land around the lake was taken up and settled During the settlement's first three or four years. Later-arriving immigrants had to go farther into the country to secure homesteads.

Chisago City was originally settled one mile south, but when the railroad bypassed the town in 1880, the city moved closer to the railroad, as often happened during that time.

== Demographics ==
Historical population
Census	Pop.	Note	%±
1880	92		—
1910	276		—
1920	422		52.9%
1930	416		−1.4%
1940	510		22.6%
1950	703		37.8%
1960	772		9.8%
1970	1,068		38.3%
1980	1,634		53.0%
1990	2,009		22.9%
2000	2,622		30.5%
2010	4,967		89.4%
2020	5,558		11.9%
U.S. Decennial Census

=== 2020 census ===
As of the 2020 census, Chisago City had a population of 5,558. The median age was 43.8 years. 22.7% of residents were under the age of 18 and 22.6% of residents were 65 years of age or older. For every 100 females there were 98.7 males, and for every 100 females age 18 and over there were 96.1 males age 18 and over.

54.7% of residents lived in urban areas, while 45.3% lived in rural areas.

There were 2,223 households in Chisago City, of which 29.8% had children under the age of 18 living in them. Of all households, 55.6% were married-couple households, 16.7% were households with a male householder and no spouse or partner present, and 21.5% were households with a female householder and no spouse or partner present. About 27.5% of all households were made up of individuals and 16.0% had someone living alone who was 65 years of age or older.

There were 2,378 housing units, of which 6.5% were vacant. The homeowner vacancy rate was 1.4% and the rental vacancy rate was 5.4%.

Racial composition as of the 2020 census
Race	Number	Percent
White	5,172	93.1%
Black or African American	14	0.3%
American Indian and Alaska Native	11	0.2%
Asian	55	1.0%
Native Hawaiian and Other Pacific Islander	0	0.0%
Some other race	55	1.0%
Two or more races	251	4.5%
Hispanic or Latino (of any race)	127	2.3%

=== 2010 census ===
As of the census of 2010, there were 4,967 people, 2,051 households, and 1,306 families living in the city. The population density was 396.4 inhabitants per square mile (153.1/km^{2}). There were 2,209 housing units at an average density of 176.3 units per square mile (68.1 units/km^{2}). The racial makeup of the city was 96.7% White, 0.6% African American, 0.5% Native American, 0.6% Asian, 0.1% Pacific Islander, 0.3% from other races, and 1.1% from two or more races. Hispanic or Latino of any race were 1.7% of the population.

There were 2,051 households, of which 29.8% had children under the age of 18 living with them, 51.9% were married couples living together, 7.5% had a female householder with no husband present, 4.3% had a male householder with no wife present, and 36.3% were non-families. 31.5% of all households were made up of individuals, and 18.9% had someone living alone who was 65 years of age or older. The average household size was 2.35 and the average family size was 2.93.

The median age in the city was 43.3 years. 22.7% of residents were under the age of 18; 6.4% were between the ages of 18 and 24; 22.9% were from 25 to 44; 27.9% were from 45 to 64; and 20.2% were 65 years of age or older. The gender makeup of the city was 48.4% male and 51.6% female.

=== 2000 census ===
As of the census of 2000, there were 2,622 people, 1,038 households, and 685 families living in the city. The population density was 1,329.0 inhabitants per square mile (513.1/km^{2}). There were 1,107 housing units at an average density of 561.1 units per square mile (216.6 units/km^{2}). The racial makeup of the city was 97.10% White, 0.53% African American, 0.19% Native American, 0.46% Asian, 0.08% Pacific Islander, 0.57% from other races, and 1.07% from two or more races. Hispanic or Latino of any race were 1.60% of the population.

There were 1,038 households, out of which 32.9% had children under the age of 18 living with them, 51.4% were married couples living together, 10.1% had a female householder with no husband present, and 34.0% were non-families. 29.2% of all households were made up of individuals, and 17.1% had someone living alone who was 65 years of age or older. The average household size was 2.42 and the average family size was 2.96.

In the city, the population was spread out, with 25.1% under the age of 18, 8.0% from 18 to 24, 27.8% from 25 to 44, 18.1% from 45 to 64, and 21.0% who were 65 years of age or older. The median age was 38 years. For every 100 females, there were 87.3 males. For every 100 females age 18 and over, there were 81.3 males.

The median income for a household in the city was $38,352, and the median income for a family was $51,964. Males had a median income of $38,988 versus $27,163 for females. The per capita income for the city was $22,321. About 3.8% of families and 6.0% of the population were below the poverty line, including 4.1% of those under age 18 and 8.0% of those age 65 or over.

== Sister cities ==
- Algutsboda, Sweden

== See also ==
- Chisago Lakes School District
