= Bob Barrett (politician) =

American politician

Member of the Minnesota House of Representatives
- In office January 8, 2013 – January 2, 2017
- Preceded by: Kurt Zellers
- Succeeded by: Anne Neu
- Constituency: District 32B
- In office January 4, 2011 – January 8, 2013
- Preceded by: Jeremy Kalin
- Succeeded by: Mary Sawatzky
- Constituency: District 17A

Personal details
- Born: 1967 (age 58–59)
- Party: Republican
- Spouse: Judi
- Children: 2
- Education: Minnesota State University, Mankato
- Occupation: executive director

Robert "Bob" Barrett (born 1967) is a Minnesota politician and former member of the Minnesota House of Representatives. A member of the Republican Party of Minnesota, he represented District 32B, which included portions of Chisago County just north of the Twin Cities metropolitan area.

== Early life, education, and career ==
Barrett graduated from Minnesota State University, Mankato in Mankato, receiving his B.A. in Accounting in 1989. Active in his community, he served on the Chisago Lakes School District Finance Team, and was also a school district mentor. He is a sports referee and umpire, officiating for basketball, football, baseball and softball games. He is the Director of Market Research and Marketing Analysis for the Hazelden Foundation.

== Minnesota House of Representatives ==
Barrett was first elected to the House in 2010. He was re-elected in 2012 and 2014.

== False campaign literature distribution and conviction ==
On February 5, 2013, Representative Barrett was fined $1000 for disseminating campaign literature that misrepresented the record of his opponent in the previous election. The Administrative Law Judge Panel concluded that the false information "likely had some impact on voters" in Barrett's 51%/49% victory. (Barrett) stated that his opponent “did not serve on the education committee even though our schools need help.” Barrett’s challenger Rick Olseen did sit on an education committee when he served as a state senator.

== Residency questions ==
For most of his tenure in the legislature, Barrett claimed a rental home in Taylors Falls as his residence in the district. However, he also owned a home in Shafer, which is in neighboring District 39A.

In 2014, Barrett's residency in the district that he represented came into question. Evidence submitted included photos of the empty house and affidavits from neighbors claiming that Barrett indeed, was not observed as being a resident of the home in question. In August 2014 District Court Judge George Stephenson ruled there was insufficient evidence to support claims that Barrett didn't live in District 32B, "despite his own doubts" about Barrett's residency.

In 2016, Barrett's residency was brought before the same judge that had ruled in 2014 that Barrett's residency evidence was "insufficient". In early August, evidence collected from a group of advocates was entered into a formal complaint against Barrett and his claim of residency in his own district. The plaintiffs visited the Taylors Falls home 30 times over 15 days and found little evidence that the house was used at all. This time, Stephenson upheld the plaintiffs' claims and ordered Barrett off the ballot. Stephenson cited "clear and convincing evidence" that Barrett didn’t live in House District 32B.

Stephenson's opinion questioned the legitimacy of Barrett's claims that he had lived in the Taylors Falls house since 2015. He noted that Barrett had maintained virtually no physical presence at the house for at least six months before the election, as required by the state constitution. Notably, Barrett didn't entertain at the house, didn't do his laundry there, and had no "creature comforts" such as cable/satellite television, Internet service, or trash pickup. He also noted that among more than 30 visits, Barrett never was available at the Taylors Falls house. He rented the house from a campaign donor for $300 a month, about 1/4 of the normal market value for a house of that scale. Barrett claimed that he intended to buy the house, but hadn't told the donor about it. Stephenson also questioned claims that Barrett's wife didn't feel safe at the Taylors Falls house, since the relevant documents were not available to her until three months later.

The Minnesota Supreme Court heard an appeal on the ballot removal on September 6, 2016. On September 9, 2016, the Minnesota Supreme Court upheld the ruling removing Barrett from the November ballot. The Supreme Court held that the results of the race in District 32B would not be certified, resulting in the seat falling vacant when Barrett's term ended on January 3, 2017. The Supreme Court ordered a special election for District 32B for February 14, 2017. The Minnesota Republican Party was required to choose a candidate for that special election by Nov 15, 2016. This person must have resided in the district before Aug 14, 2016, six months before the special election. This effectively disqualified Barrett, who the court had ruled does not live in the district.

On February 14, 2017, the seat was won by fellow Republican Anne Neu.
