= Matt Norris =

American politician

Member of the Minnesota House of Representatives from the 32B district
- Incumbent
- Assumed office January 3, 2023
- Preceded by: Donald Raleigh

Personal details
- Born: December 3, 1988 (age 37)
- Party: Democratic (DFL)
- Education: University of Minnesota, Twin Cities (BSB); University of Minnesota Law School (JD)
- Occupation: Nonprofit; Legislator
- Website: Government website Campaign website

Matt Norris (born December 3, 1988) is an American politician serving in the Minnesota House of Representatives since 2023. A member of the Minnesota Democratic-Farmer-Labor Party (DFL), Norris represents District 32B in the northern Twin Cities metropolitan area, which includes the cities of Blaine and Lexington in Anoka County.

== Early life, education, and career ==
Norris grew up in Brooklyn Park, Minnesota. He received his bachelor's degree in marketing from the University of Minnesota and his Juris Doctor degree from the University of Minnesota Law School.

Norris interned for U.S. Senator Amy Klobuchar in 2009, and worked as a law clerk for the U.S. Senate Judiciary Committee in 2012. From 2010 to 2017, he worked as the youth planner for the city of Brooklyn Park. Before being elected to the legislature, Norris was policy director of Youthprise, a nonprofit.

== Minnesota House of Representatives ==
Norris was elected to the Minnesota House of Representatives in 2022. He defeated one-term Republican incumbent Donald Raleigh.

Norris serves as vice chair of the Taxes Committee, and sits on the Transportation Finance and Policy, Veterans and Military Affairs Finance and Policy, and Housing Finance and Policy Committees.

=== Policy positions ===
Norris authored legislation to double funding for programs designed to train students in the trades as they build affordable housing in the state. He also wrote a bill to increase the cap for the homestead market value exclusion, saying he heard on the campaign trail from residents and seniors struggling to keep up with rising house values.

Norris sponsored a bill that would toughen a 2019 law that banned the use of PFAS chemicals in firefighting foam, expanding it to cover all uses not required by federal law. Pharmaceutical corporations and conservative think tanks attacked him for supporting a bill that would create a Prescription Drug Affordability Board that could set limits on medication prices.

== Electoral history ==
2022 Minnesota State House - District 32B
Party	Candidate	Votes	%
Democratic (DFL)	Matt Norris	9,098	51.12
Republican	Donald Raleigh (incumbent)	8,685	48.79
Write-in		16	0.09
Total votes		17,799	100.0
Democratic (DFL) gain from Republican			

== Personal life ==
Norris lives in Blaine, Minnesota.
