= Chisago Lake =

Lake in Minnesota, United States

- Location within Minnesota
- Location: Chisago County, Minnesota
- Coordinates: 45°21′37″N 92°52′16″W
- Type: lake
- Etymology: Ojibwe language name for the lake
- Surface area: 327 ha (809 acres)

Chisago Lake is a lake in Chisago County, Minnesota, in the United States. "Chisago" is a name derived from two Ojibwe language words meaning "large" and "beautiful".

Chisago Lake holds numerous species of fish. Northern pike, largemouth bass, crappie, perch, walleye, and panfish make up the majority of the lake's fish population, although some muskellunge and common carp have also been found in surveys by the DNR.

== See also ==
- List of Minnesota placenames of Native American origin
