= Chisago County, Minnesota =

County in Minnesota, United States

- County
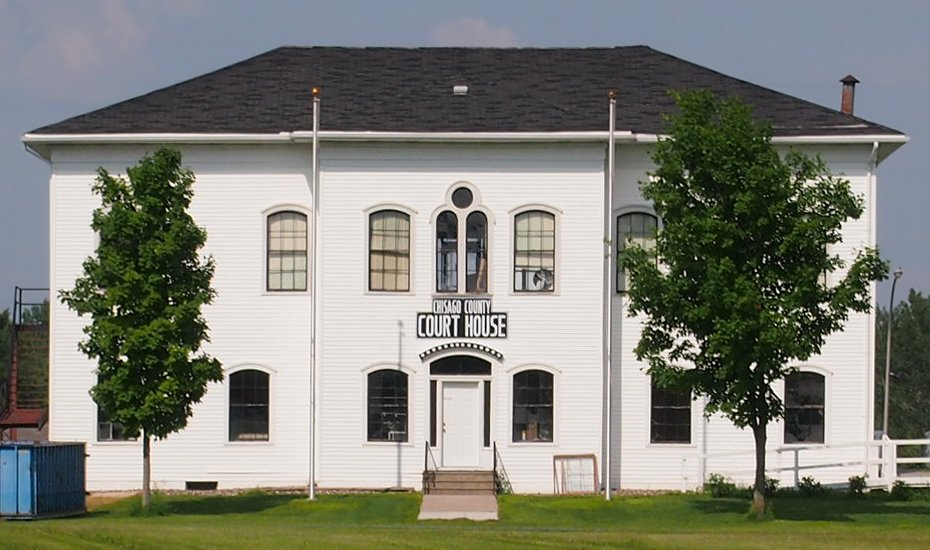
- Old Chisago County Courthouse originally in Center City, Minnesota, moved in 1990 to Almelund, Minnesota.

- Logo

- Location within the U.S. state of Minnesota
- Coordinates: 45°30′09″N 92°54′30″W
- Country: United States
- State: Minnesota
- Founded: September 1, 1851
- Named for: Chisago Lake
- Seat: Center City
- Largest city: North Branch

Area
  - Total: 442 sq mi (1,140 km^{2})
  - Land: 415 sq mi (1,070 km^{2})
  - Water: 28 sq mi (73 km^{2}) 6.2%

Population (2020)
  - Total: 56,621
  - Estimate (2025): 59,142 ▲
  - Density: 136/sq mi (52.7/km^{2})
- Time zone: UTC−6 (Central)
  - Summer (DST): UTC−5 (CDT)
- Congressional district: 8th
- Website: www.chisagocountymn.gov

Chisago County (/ʃɪˈsɑːɡoʊ/ shi-SAH-goh) is a county in the east-central part of the U.S. state of Minnesota. The county covers an area of 442 square miles (1,140 square kilometers) and, as of the 2020 Census, had a population of 56,621 people. It is part of the Minneapolis-St. Paul-Bloomington Metropolitan Statistical Area. The county's largest city is North Branch. Within Chisago County is the Chisago Lakes area, which includes the combined areas of Shafer, Chisago City, Lindström, and Center City. Center City is the county seat. The county has a diverse economy, including manufacturing, agriculture, and tourism.

== History ==
=== Early history ===
Before the arrival of European settlers, the area that is now Chisago County was home to the Dakota and Ojibwe tribes. The Dakota lived in the southern part of the county and the Ojibwe in the northern part. The first European to explore the area was Sieur duLuth in 1679. French and English trading posts were established in Taylors Falls and Sunrise during the 18th century. In the late 18th and early 19th centuries, French fur traders who traveled south from Lake Superior established trading posts along the river, extending as far south as Taylors Falls.

In 1837, a treaty between the United States and the Chippewa Nation led to the cession of all lands between the St. Croix and Mississippi River, opening the area for European settlement.

=== European Settlement ===
The first European settlers arrived in the Chisago County area in the early 1800s. Most of them were of Swedish descent, and they came in search of land and new opportunities. They established small farms and communities throughout the county. Chisago County's early economy was based on farming, logging, and mining. Its forests and mines attracted many settlers to the area. Records of early businesses in Chisago County are recorded in Lindströmsjö. Many Swedes emigrated seeking religious freedom from the oppressive Lutheran Church of Sweden. However, the majority left for reasons other than religious repression and still identified as Lutherans. The early Swedish churches in Minnesota, like the Chisago Lake Evangelical Lutheran Church in Center City, were initially lay-led due to the absence of ordained clergy.

In the mid-1800s, the area that is now Chisago County was part of the Minnesota Territory, and it was not officially established as a county until 1851. It took its name from the Chisago Lake. In its aboriginal form it was "Ki-chi-saga", from two Ojibwe words: "kichi" (large) and "saga" (fair or lovely).

The county seat was originally in Taylors Falls, but was relocated to Chisago City in 1865. It took three more years before the legislature approved this relocation and voters approved it in a referendum. The move was later challenged in the courts on allegations of election fraud, resulting in a two-year delay before the state Supreme Court validated the results. In 1875, the county seat was again moved, this time to Center City where it remains as of 2026.

The development of transportation infrastructure in Chisago County began with the completion of the first bridge across the St. Croix River at Taylors Falls in 1856. Prior to the bridge, ferryboats provided crossings at Sunrise and Rush City. In 1868, a military road was constructed, spanning the entire county from north to south. Railroads soon became a vital mode of transportation, with the completion of the St. Paul and Duluth Railroad, also running north to south, in 1870.

=== Progressive Era ===
By the early 1900s and the dawn of the Progressive Era, much of Chisago County's forests had been cleared, leading to the closure of sawmills and the departure of lumberjacks in search of new employment. Advancements in farm machinery enabled fewer workers to manage larger farms. The county's economy shifted toward manufacturing and industry. The county was home to factories and mills, including sawmills, flour mills, and paper mills.

The Progressive Era also led to reform movements resonating throughout Minnesota and Chisago County. The county's distinct approach to education can be primarily attributed to its homogeneous population and the unique structure of local governance. This uniformity allowed the school boards in Chisago County to effectively control external influences through their selection of teachers.

Nearly 70% of Chisago County voters supported Progressive Party candidate Theodore Roosevelt in 1912.

=== Post-war ===
Between 1970 and 2000, Chisago County's population surged by 135%. Enhanced transportation networks, including Interstate Highway 35 and U.S. Highway 8, facilitated access to broader regions and led to business and industrial growth.

=== Modern era ===
Today, Chisago County has a diverse economy. It is home to several manufacturing companies, including the Andersen Corporation, a major producer of windows and doors. Agriculture is also a large part of the local economy, with crops such as corn, soybeans, and wheat grown in the county. Tourism is also growing, with visitors drawn to the Chisago Lakes area's recreational opportunities.

The county has retained and continues to celebrate much of its Swedish heritage.

== Geography ==
Chisago County lies on Minnesota's eastern border, abutting the western border of Wisconsin (across the Saint Croix River). The Saint Croix flows south-southeast along the county's eastern border. The Sunrise River flows north through the county's central part, collecting the waters of the North Branch Sunrise River and Hay Creek before discharging into the St. Croix at the county's eastern boundary. The largest lakes in the county are Green Lake (1,800 acres [2.8 mi^{2}]) and Chisago Lake (897 acres [1.402 mi^{2}]). The county has 72,257 acres (112.902 mi^{2}) of wetlands.

The county terrain consists of rolling hills, devoted to agriculture. The terrain slopes to the south and east. Its highest point, anomalously, is a hill west of Wild Mountain Ski Area, seven miles north of Taylors Falls, at 1,130 ft (340 m) ASL. The county has an area of 442 square miles (1,140 km^{2}), of which 415 square miles (1,070 km^{2}) is land and 28 square miles (73 km^{2}) (6.2%) is water.

=== Major highways ===
- Interstate 35
- US Highway 8
- US Highway 61
- Minnesota State Highway 95
- Minnesota State Highway 243
- List of county roads

=== Adjacent counties ===
- Pine County - north
- Burnett County, Wisconsin - northeast
- Polk County, Wisconsin - east
- Washington County - south
- Anoka County - southwest
- Isanti County - west
- Kanabec County - northwest

=== Protected areas ===
- Fish Lake County Park
- Franconia Bluffs Scientific and Natural Area
- Interstate State Park
- Lawrence Creek Scientific and Natural Area
- Ojiketa Regional Park
- Saint Croix National Scenic Riverway (part)
- Wild River State Park

== Climate and weather ==
Center City, Minnesota

Climate chart (precipitation, max. and min. temperature)
J	F	M	A	M	J	J	A	S	O	N	D
0.9 24 2	0.9 31 7	1.6 43 19	2.8 59 33	3.7 70 45	4.5 79 56	4.4 84 60	3.9 81 58	3.6 72 49	2.8 60 37	1.9 42 22	1.1 27 8
- █ Average max. and min. temperatures in °F
- █ Precipitation totals in inches
- Source: The Weather Channel
Metric conversion
J	F	M	A	M	J	J	A	S	O	N	D
23 −4 −17	23 −1 −14	41 6 −7	72 15 1	94 21 7	114 26 13	112 29 16	99 27 14	90 22 9	72 16 3	47 6 −6	29 −3 −13
- █ Average max. and min. temperatures in °C
- █ Precipitation totals in mm

Chisago County has a humid continental climate (Köppen climate classification Dfb) with long, cold winters and warm summers. The average high temperature in the summer is around 80 °F (27 °C), while the average low temperature in the winter is around 5 °F (−15 °C).

A record low of −38 °F (−39 °C) was recorded in January 1977 and a record high of 104 °F (40 °C) was recorded in July 1988.

The county's location in the Upper Midwest region of the United States exposes it to a wide range of weather patterns, including severe thunderstorms, tornadoes, and blizzards. The county experiences moderate precipitation throughout the year, with an average annual rainfall of 30 inches (760 mm) and an average annual snowfall of 47 inches (1,200 mm). Spring is the most active season for severe weather, with thunderstorms and tornadoes common. Winter storms are common during the winter, with heavy snowfall and blizzards.

== Demographics ==
Historical population
Census	Pop.	Note	%±
1860	1,743		—
1870	4,358		150.0%
1880	7,982		83.2%
1890	10,359		29.8%
1900	13,248		27.9%
1910	13,537		2.2%
1920	14,445		6.7%
1930	13,189		−8.7%
1940	13,124		−0.5%
1950	12,669		−3.5%
1960	13,419		5.9%
1970	17,492		30.4%
1980	25,717		47.0%
1990	30,521		18.7%
2000	41,101		34.7%
2010	53,887		31.1%
2020	56,621		5.1%
2025 (est.)	59,142	▲	4.5%
U.S. Decennial Census; 1790-1960 1900-1990; 1990-2000 2010-2020

From 1960 to 2010, Chisago County has been one of the state's fastest growing counties. From 2000 to 2014, Chisago County was the fifth-fastest growing county in the state, experiencing a population increase of 12,924 (growth rate of 31.4 percent).

95.4% of residents have at least a high school education, and 22.2% have attained a bachelor's degree or higher. 4.9% are veterans.

=== 2020 census ===
As of the 2020 census, the county had a population of 56,621. The median age was 40.8 years. 23.1% of residents were under the age of 18 and 16.1% of residents were 65 years of age or older. For every 100 females there were 106.0 males, and for every 100 females age 18 and over there were 106.7 males age 18 and over.

The racial makeup of the county was 90.8% White, 1.5% Black or African American, 0.6% American Indian and Alaska Native, 1.4% Asian, <0.1% Native Hawaiian and Pacific Islander, 0.9% from some other race, and 4.9% from two or more races. Hispanic or Latino residents of any race comprised 2.6% of the population.

34.3% of residents lived in urban areas, while 65.7% lived in rural areas.

There were 20,900 households in the county, of which 32.0% had children under the age of 18 living in them. Of all households, 58.7% were married-couple households, 15.5% were households with a male householder and no spouse or partner present, and 17.5% were households with a female householder and no spouse or partner present. About 21.5% of all households were made up of individuals and 9.8% had someone living alone who was 65 years of age or older.

There were 22,294 housing units, of which 6.3% were vacant. Among occupied housing units, 86.6% were owner-occupied and 13.4% were renter-occupied. The homeowner vacancy rate was 0.8% and the rental vacancy rate was 6.2%.

=== Age ===
Population by decade

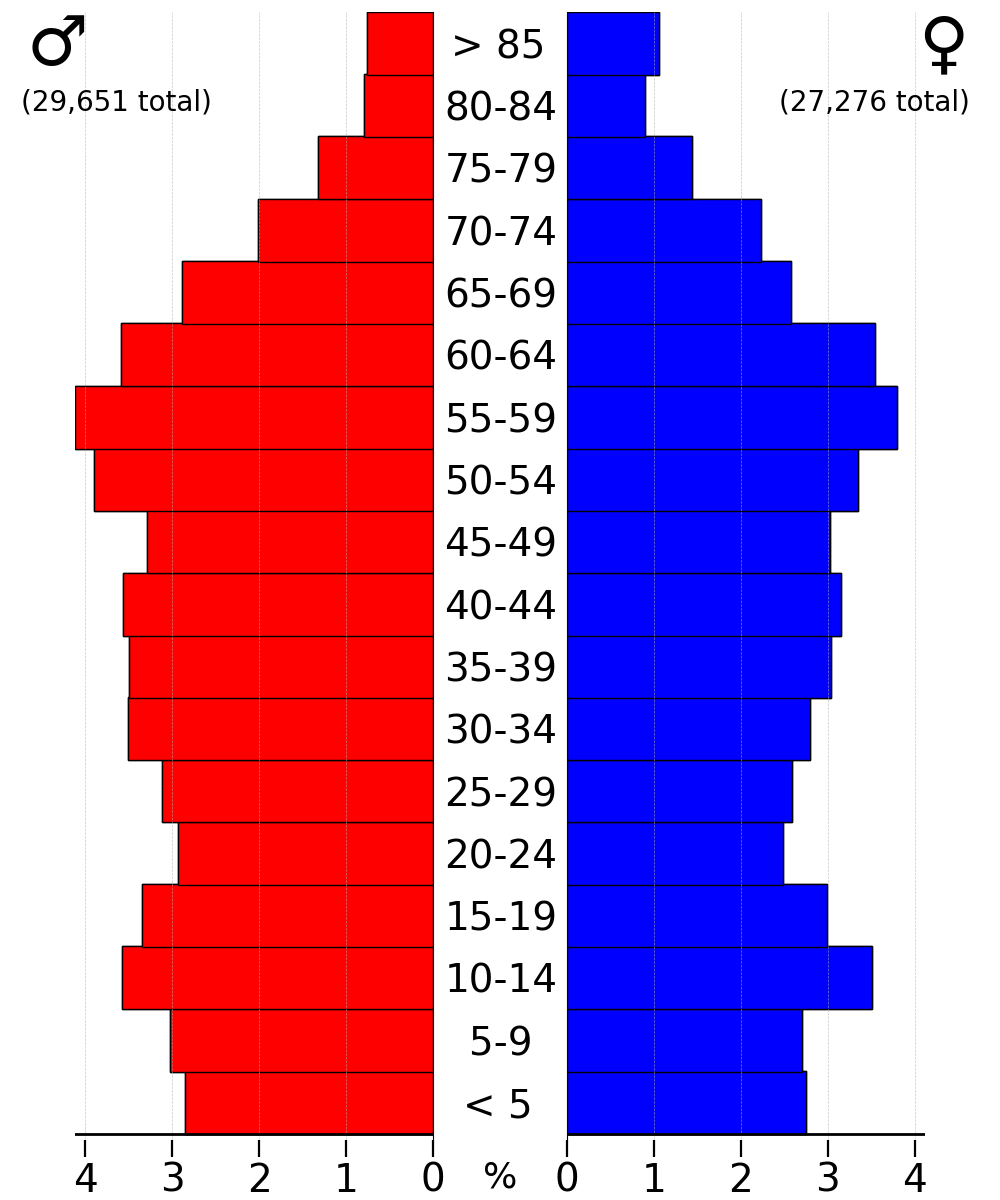
2022 US Census population pyramid for Chisago County, from ACS 5-year estimate

=== Race and ethnicity ===
Historically, Chisago County has been overwhelmingly populated by non-Hispanic Whites. Since 2000, it has been home to a small but growing Black, Asian, and Hispanic population.

Year	Total	White alone		Black alone		Hispanic (any race)		Native alone		Asian alone (incl. Pacific Is.)		Other race alone		Two or more	
Year	Total	Number	%	Number	%	Number	%	Number	%	Number	%	Number	%	Number	%
1950	12,669	12,660	99.93	—N/a	—N/a	—N/a	—N/a	—N/a	—N/a	—N/a	—N/a	9 (Note: Non-white)	0.06	—N/a	—N/a
1960	13,419	13,392	99.80	21	0.16	—N/a	—N/a	—N/a	—N/a	6 (Note: 2 Indian, 4 Japanese, 0 Chinese, 0 Filipino)	0.04	0	0.00	—N/a	—N/a
1970	17,492	17,427	99.63	33	0.19	—N/a	—N/a	—N/a	—N/a	—N/a	—N/a	32	0.18	—N/a	—N/a
1980	25,717	25,423	98.86	28	0.11	91 (Note: 78 White, 13 other)	0.35	76	0.30	59	0.23	40	0.16	—N/a	—N/a
1990	30,521	30,099	98.62	63	0.21	137 (Note: 89 White, 5 Native American, 2 Black, 1 Asian, 40 other)	0.45	120	0.39	89	0.29	13	0.04	—N/a	—N/a
2000	41,101	39,953	97.21	210	0.51	473	1.15	187	0.45	287	0.70	126	0.31	327	0.80
2010	53,887 (Note: This figure includes inmates at the Minnesota Correctional Facility – Rush City)	51,013	94.67	636	1.18	835	1.55	313	0.58	480	0.89	19	0.04	591	1.10
2020	56,621	50,804	89.73	845	1.49	1,451	2.56	309	0.55	771	1.36	185	0.33	2,256	3.98

=== Ancestry ===
The most common ancestries in Chisago County are German, English, Swedish, Irish and Norwegian.

Ancestry	Any ancestry (Note: Any ancestry includes individuals identifying with either a single ethnic group (full ancestry) or with a mixed heritage from multiple groups (partial ancestry).)			Full ancestry (Note: Full ancestry only includes those who identify with a single group, without any mixed heritage.)		
Ancestry	Rank	Population	%	Rank	Population	%
German	1	19,608	34.63	1	6,551	11.57
Irish	2	8,895	15.71	4	1,515	2.68
Swedish	3	8,368	14.78	3	2,380	4.20
English	4	6,992	12.35	2	2,766	4.89
Norwegian	5	6,463	11.41	5	1,467	2.59
Polish	6	3,127	5.52	7	637	1.13
French	7	2,846	5.03	9	359	0.63
Italian	8	1,859	3.28	8	509	0.90
Scandinavian	9	1,692	2.99	6	985	1.74
Scottish	10	1,239	2.19	15	118	0.21
Danish	11	945	1.67	12	144	0.25
Dutch	12	908	1.60	11	146	0.26
Finnish	13	900	1.59	10	257	0.45
Czech	14	884	1.56	13	142	0.25
Mexican	15	883	1.56	—N/a	—N/a	—N/a
French-Canadian	16	691	1.22	14	139	0.25

=== Nativity ===
Percent of population reporting Swedish ancestry in 2020 by census tract

In 2021, 97.9% of residents were born in the United States, and 78.5% had been born in Minnesota. Among the foreign-born population, 56.5% were naturalized U.S. citizens. 97.1% of residents spoke only English at home.

From the late 19th to mid-20th century, a majority of the foreign-born population was born in Sweden. As of 2022, the U.S. Census Bureau estimated that 1,174 people were foreign born, or 2.06% of the total population. Of these, about 40% were born in Asia, 30% in Latin America, 15% in Canada, 10% in Europe, and 5% in Africa.

Country of birth of foreign born population, 1930–1970
Country of birth
Country of birth	1900		1930		1940		1970	
Country of birth	Number	%	Number	%	Number	%	Number	%
Sweden	4,215	84.00	2,319	84.85	1,541	82.45	220	59.46
Germany	390	2.94	133	4.86	92	4.93	52	14.05
Norway	69	1.38	94	3.44	77	4.12	8	2.16
Canada	128	2.55	56	2.05	38	2.03	16	4.32
Denmark	55	0.42	41	1.50	40	2.14	6	1.62
Other	161	3.21	90	3.29	80	4.28	68	18.38
Total foreign born	5,018	100.00	2,733	100.00	1,868	100.00	370	100.0

Country of birth of foreign born population, 2022
Country	Number	Percent
Mexico	201	17.12
Canada	178	15.16
Philippines	116	9.88
Thailand	68	5.79
Laos	64	5.45
Honduras	61	5.20
Cambodia	60	5.11
South Korea	51	4.34
China	37	3.15
Russia	36	3.07
Brazil	30	2.56
Ukraine	28	2.38
Other	244	20.79
Total	1,174	100.00

=== Religion ===
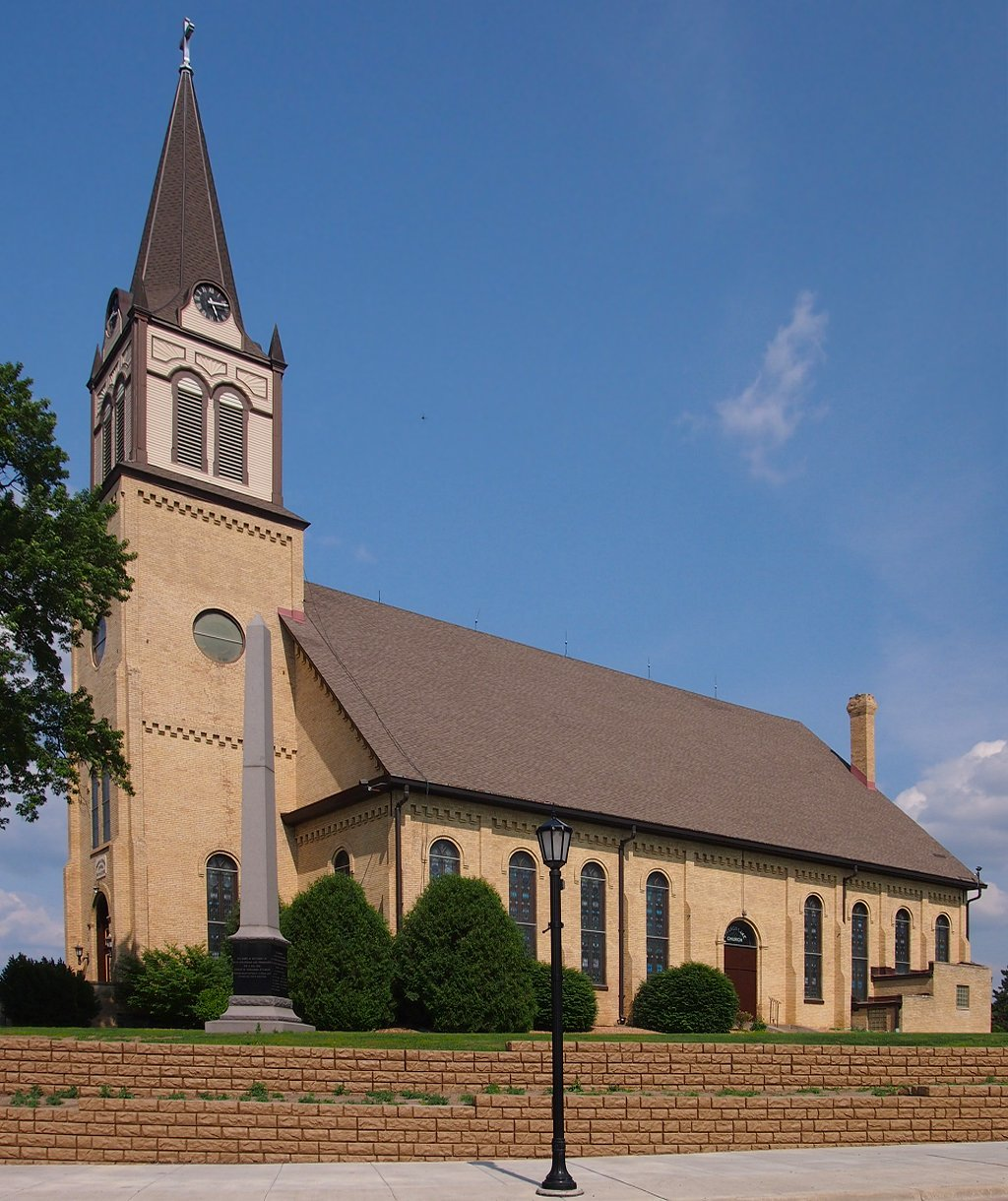
Chisago Lake Evangelical Lutheran Church

The 2020 U.S. Religion Census conducted by the Association of Statisticians of American Religious Bodies found that 7,549 Chisago County residents were affiliated with the Catholic Church, 6,098 with the Evangelical Lutheran Church in America, and 2,975 with the Assemblies of God.

A notable religious building in Chisago County is the Chisago Lake Lutheran Church. The church was founded in 1890 and has been in Center City since 1906. It is part of the Evangelical Lutheran Church in America.

Another prominent religious building in the county is the First United Methodist Church of Lindström. The church has served the community for over 130 years.

The Church of St. Joseph in Taylors Falls is a Catholic church that was founded in 1854. The current building was constructed in 1896.

=== Transportation ===
Among workers 16 years and older, 80.3% commuted to work by car, 9.0% carpooled, 1.6% used public transit, and 2.2% walked, biked, or used some other method. 7.0% worked from home. The median household income was $86,900, slightly above the state average. 6.4% of residents lived below the poverty line, and 2.5% were unemployed. 86.4% of housing in the county was owner-occupied.

Arrowhead Transit provides public bus routes and Dial-A-Ride in Chisago County.

== Education ==
- Chisago Lakes High School
- North Branch Area High School
- Rush City High School

== Communities ==
=== Cities ===
- Center City (county seat)
- Chisago City
- Harris
- Lindström
- North Branch
- Rush City
- Shafer
- Stacy
- Taylors Falls
- Wyoming

=== Unincorporated communities ===
- Almelund
- Franconia
- Palmdale
- Rush Point
- Stark
- Sunrise

=== Townships ===
- Amador Township
- Chisago Lake Township
- Fish Lake Township
- Franconia Township
- Lent Township (former, now defunct)
- Nessel Township
- Rushseba Township
- Shafer Township
- Sunrise Township
- Wyoming Township (former, now defunct)

== Culture ==
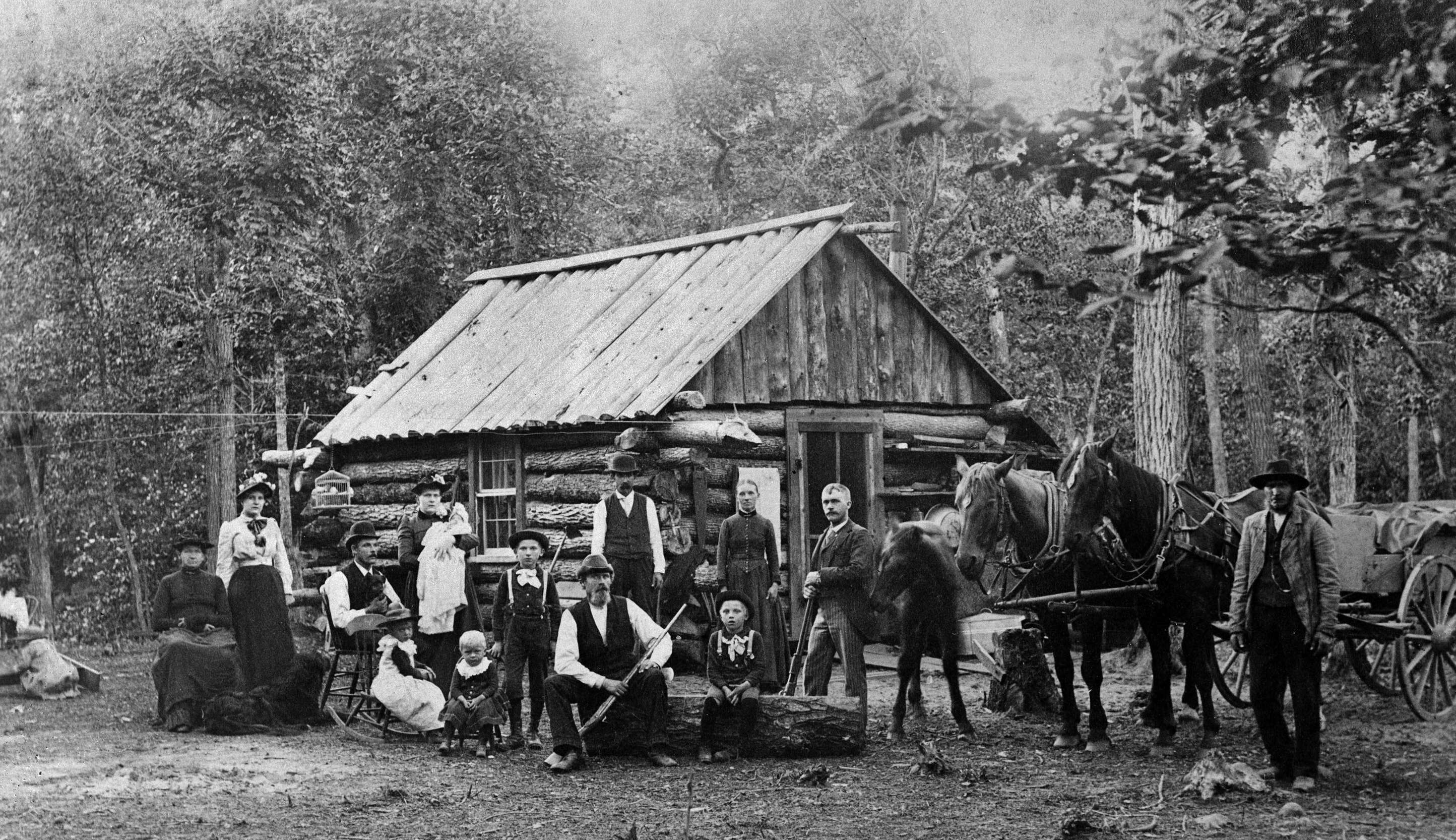
Swedish immigrants in Rush City, Minnesota, in 1887.

Chisago County is strongly influenced by the German, Swedish and Norwegian immigrants who settled there in the mid-19th century. It provided the setting for much of Swedish author Vilhelm Moberg's suite of novels The Emigrants in the 1950s, and Moberg engaged in both archival and oral history research for his books to recreate the area's early Swedish immigration. Sculptor Ian Dudley's bronze statue of Moberg stands in Chisago City's park.

Moberg's fictional characters Karl-Oskar and Kristina Nilsson from Ljuder parish in Småland in 1850 with three small children and a group of relatives and neighbors, during the period of the first wave of mass emigration from Sweden.

Moberg penned Karl Oskar as the first to settle around Lake Ki-Chi-Saga (from the Ojibwe Ki-chi-saga-igun, or Gichi-zaaga'igan in contemporary spelling), meaning "big lake with an outlet", which was later shortened to Lake Chisago. The annual Karl Oskar Days in Lindström honor the early settlers' heritage.

== Government and politics ==
=== Government ===
The County Board, comprising five members, is responsible for setting policies and making laws in the county. Its members are elected from specific regions and serve four-year terms in a rotating manner.

The County Board sets the county tax rate, adopts the budget, appoints boards and commissions, approves grants and personnel actions, and oversees the administration of county government.

The Chisago County Court Administrator's Office is responsible for maintaining records, managing case flow, overseeing jury management, and collecting fines for all District Court cases in the county. These cases encompass various types, such as juvenile, civil, family, probate, criminal, and conciliation court cases. Chisago County accommodates three chambered judges in a full-time capacity, and is part of the 10th Judicial District, which comprises eight counties and 45 judges. Any judge in this district may preside over cases in Chisago County.

==== County Commissioners ====
Office	Name	Party
District 1	Jim Swenson	Nonpartisan
District 2	Rick Greene	Nonpartisan
District 3	Marlys Dunne	Nonpartisan
District 4	Ben Montzka	Nonpartisan
District 5	Dan Dahlberg	Nonpartisan

==== County officials ====
Office	Name	Party
Attorney	Janet Reiter	Nonpartisan
Auditor-Treasurer	Bridgitte Konrad	Nonpartisan
Recorder	Karen Long	Nonpartisan
Sheriff	Brandon Thyen	Nonpartisan

=== Politics ===
Chisago County has trended conservative in recent state and federal elections, backing every Republican nominee for president since 2000.

==== State legislators ====
Office	District	Name	Party	Residence
Senate	11	Jason Rarick	Republican	Pine City
Senate	28	Mark Koran	Republican	North Branch
House	11B	Nathan Nelson	Republican	Hinckley
House	28A	Jimmy Gordon	Republican	Isanti
House	28B	Max Rymer	Republican	North Branch

==== Federal officials ====
Office	District	Name	Party
Senate	Statewide	Amy Klobuchar	DFL
Senate	Statewide	Tina Smith	DFL
House	8th	Pete Stauber	Republican

=== Presidential elections ===
United States presidential election results for Chisago County, Minnesota
Year	Republican		Democratic		Third party(ies)	
Year	No.	%	No.	%	No.	%
1892	1,480	75.01%	338	17.13%	155	7.86%
1896	2,558	84.37%	437	14.41%	37	1.22%
1900	2,354	83.36%	411	14.55%	59	2.09%
1904	2,417	91.45%	156	5.90%	70	2.65%
1908	2,107	79.90%	408	15.47%	122	4.63%
1912	346	13.31%	435	16.73%	1,819	69.96%
1916	1,749	61.22%	944	33.04%	164	5.74%
1920	4,361	80.02%	484	8.88%	605	11.10%
1924	2,678	52.80%	135	2.66%	2,259	44.54%
1928	4,215	75.51%	1,297	23.24%	70	1.25%
1932	2,524	43.86%	3,047	52.95%	184	3.20%
1936	2,462	40.49%	3,360	55.26%	258	4.24%
1940	3,569	55.97%	2,746	43.06%	62	0.97%
1944	3,020	55.58%	2,376	43.72%	38	0.70%
1948	2,704	44.58%	3,184	52.50%	177	2.92%
1952	3,892	60.25%	2,536	39.26%	32	0.50%
1956	3,413	55.47%	2,731	44.38%	9	0.15%
1960	3,822	56.59%	2,907	43.04%	25	0.37%
1964	2,525	36.65%	4,347	63.10%	17	0.25%
1968	3,053	39.90%	4,102	53.61%	496	6.48%
1972	4,718	51.06%	4,174	45.17%	349	3.78%
1976	3,874	35.65%	6,625	60.96%	368	3.39%
1980	5,017	40.06%	6,240	49.83%	1,266	10.11%
1984	6,279	48.12%	6,683	51.21%	87	0.67%
1988	6,163	43.49%	7,875	55.58%	132	0.93%
1992	4,813	28.11%	7,077	41.34%	5,229	30.55%
1996	5,984	33.74%	8,611	48.56%	3,138	17.70%
2000	10,937	49.74%	9,593	43.63%	1,457	6.63%
2004	15,705	55.57%	12,219	43.24%	336	1.19%
2008	15,789	53.88%	12,783	43.62%	733	2.50%
2012	16,227	55.12%	12,524	42.54%	690	2.34%
2016	18,441	61.01%	9,278	30.69%	2,509	8.30%
2020	21,916	63.40%	11,806	34.15%	848	2.45%
2024	23,047	64.74%	11,894	33.41%	660	1.85%

== See also ==
- National Register of Historic Places listings in Chisago County, Minnesota
- Swedish Americans
- Nordic immigration to North America
