= National Register of Historic Places listings in Polk County, Wisconsin =

Location of Polk County in Wisconsin

This is a list of the National Register of Historic Places listings in Polk County, Wisconsin. It is intended to provide a comprehensive listing of entries in the National Register of Historic Places that are located in Polk County, Wisconsin. The locations of National Register properties for which the latitude and longitude coordinates are included below may be seen in a map.

There are 14 properties and districts listed on the National Register in the county.

This National Park Service list is complete through NPS recent listings posted March 21, 2025.

== Current listings ==
	Name on the Register	Image	Date listed	Location	City or town	Description
1	Cushing Land Agency Building	Cushing Land Agency Building	September 1, 2005 (#05000955)	106 S. Washington St. 45°24′36″N 92°38′41″W	St. Croix Falls	In 1854 Caleb Cushing, a Massachusetts lawyer, politician, and land speculator established the company which handled many real estate transactions in Polk, Burnett, Washburn, and Barron counties. The surviving agency building was built in 1882, designed in Queen Anne/Eastlake style by Abraham Radcliffe of St. Paul.
2	Dalles Bluff Site	Dalles Bluff Site	September 5, 1981 (#81000054)	Address Restricted	St. Croix Falls	
3	First Baptist Church	First Baptist Church	March 12, 2008 (#08000201)	201 3rd Ave. 45°19′19″N 92°42′21″W	Osceola	Neo-Gothic church building with Akron floorplan and Craftsman details, built 1908-1919 and possibly designed by Harry Wild Jones.
4	Frederic Depot	Frederic Depot	March 21, 2003 (#03000133)	210 Oak St. W 45°39′36″N 92°28′06″W	Frederic	Depot building, sawed out in the Soo Line's shop in Minneapolis, hauled by rail to Frederic, and assembled in 1901, when rail was the main mode of transport.
5	Geiger Building-Old Polk County Courthouse	Geiger Building-Old Polk County Courthouse	December 2, 1985 (#85003030)	201 Cascade St. 45°19′15″N 92°42′21″W	Osceola	Saloon built by Veit Geiger in 1875. From 1882 to 1898 it was used as Polk County Courthouse and sheriff's and judge's quarters, with the beer storage area in the basement converted to county jail.
6	Alvah A. Heald House	Alvah A. Heald House	December 2, 1985 (#85003097)	202 Sixth Ave. 45°19′25″N 92°42′11″W	Osceola	Italianate-styled home built in 1879.
7	Lamar Community Center	Lamar Community Center	March 1, 1982 (#82001860)	NE of St. Croix Falls; 45°25′26″N 92°34′09″W	St. Croix Falls	Craftsman-style one-room school built in 1905, with a second room added in 1910. Then and now a unifying center of the community.
8	John Lindstrom Round Barn	John Lindstrom Round Barn	October 24, 2016 (#16000741)	1311 120th Ave. 45°22′53″N 92°25′52″W	Balsam Lake	Round barn built in 1913, with the first story walls built of fieldstone and the upper parts of wood, with a silo in the center.
9	Minneapolis, St. Paul and Sault Saint Marie Railway Depot	Minneapolis, St. Paul and Sault Saint Marie Railway Depot	December 13, 2000 (#00001535)	114 Depot Rd. 45°19′03″N 92°42′30″W	Osceola	built 1916 to replace a wooden structure. The brick structure was fancier than other Soo Line stations in towns of similar size. The Osceola Historical Society has restored it and uses it for interpretive historical education.
10	Osceola Commercial Historic District	Osceola Commercial Historic District	December 13, 2000 (#00001533)	Roughly along Cascade St., from First Ave. to Third Ave. 45°19′15″N 92°42′21″W	Osceola	17 contributing commercial buildings, ranging from the 1875 Geiger Saloon described above to the 1879 Bank of Osceola to the 1947 Art Moderne Mobil Gas Station.
11	Polk County Courthouse	Polk County Courthouse	March 9, 1982 (#82000697)	Main St. 45°27′07″N 92°27′08″W	Balsam Lake	courthouse built in 1899 was converted into three floors of museum galleries featuring a general store, blacksmith shop, barbershop, kitchen, hardware store, bedroom, parlor, ethnic exhibits, military room, and the Native American room with wigwam
12	Seven Pines Lodge	Seven Pines Lodge	December 8, 1978 (#78000125)	SE of Lewis of WI 35; 45°41′46″N 92°22′57″W	Lewis	Rustic resort complex built 1903-1910 for Minnesota wheat broker Charles E. Lewis by Norwegian carpenter John "Ole" Mangseth. Later visited by Calvin Coolidge.
13	St. Croix Falls Auditorium	St. Croix Falls Auditorium	July 20, 2007 (#07000711)	201 N Washington St; 45°24′45″N 92°38′40″W	St. Croix Falls	Built by the city in 1917, the Spanish Colonial-styled 400-seat auditorium hosted silent films, talkies, dances, commencements, basketball games, the library, city offices, and now the Festival Theatre.
14	Thomas Henry Thompson House	Thomas Henry Thompson House	March 8, 1984 (#84003777)	205 South Adams St. 45°24′32″N 92°38′37″W	St. Croix Falls	1882 Italianate house of a prominent shopkeeper and civic leader in early St. Croix Falls.

== See also ==
- List of National Historic Landmarks in Wisconsin
- National Register of Historic Places listings in Wisconsin
- Listings in neighboring counties: Barron, Burnett, Chisago (MN), Dunn, St. Croix, Washington (MN)
