= Simenstad =

Simenstad is a Norwegian surname.

== People with the surname ==
- Gard Simenstad (born 1999), Norwegian footballer
- Gunnar Simenstad (1914–1986), Norwegian actor
- Stian Simenstad (born 1991), Norwegian footballer

== Transport ==
- L.O. Simenstad Municipal Airport, village owned airport located southeast of Osceola, Wisconsin
