= Admiral Morgan =

Admiral Morgan may refer to:

- Christopher Morgan (Royal Navy officer) (born 1939), British Royal Navy vice admiral
- Henry Sturgis Morgan Jr. (1924–2011), U.S. Navy rear admiral
- John Morgan (admiral) (born 1950), U.S. Navy vice admiral

== See also ==
- Charles W. Morgan (naval officer) (1790–1853), U.S. Navy commodore (admiral-equivalent rank)
- Morgan Morgan-Giles (1914–2013), British Royal Navy rear admiral
