= Clarke County Courthouse (Iowa) =

- U.S. Historic district – Contributing property
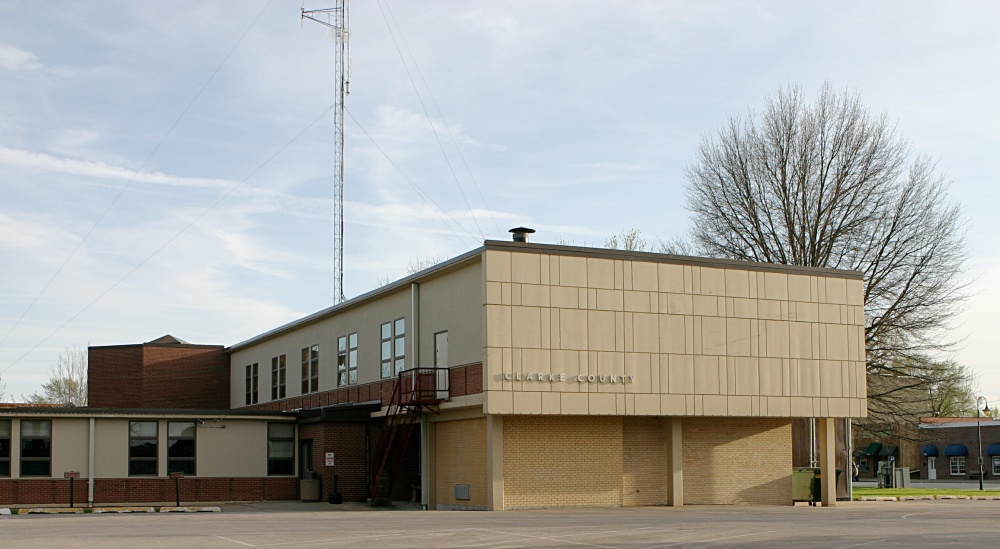

- Location within Iowa Location within the United States
- Interactive map showing the location for Clarke County Courthouse
- Location: 100 S. Main St. Osceola, Iowa
- Coordinates: 41°2′2.9″N 93°46′0.2″W
- Built: 1956
- Architectural style: Modern
- Part of: Osceola Commercial Historic District (ID100001971)
- Added to NRHP: January 19, 2018

The Clarke County Courthouse is located in Osceola, Iowa, United States. It is the third building used for court functions and county administration in Clarke County.

== History ==
On August 8, 1851, three commissioners choose the site that would become Osceola as the county seat. They purchased the land from George W. How for $100. The first courthouse was a two-story frame building that occupied a corner lot. It was built for $1,600. It had to be abandoned in 1883 because the toll that wind and weather had taken on the structure. It was replaced by a 2½-story brick structure in 1892 that was built on the public square, which up to that point had been a park. The Romanesque Revival building featured a tall clock tower. The county outgrew that building and the present Modern structure was completed in 1956. A $275,000 bond had been issued for its construction. The structure is composed of a single story section and a two-story section. It is located on the same expansive square in the middle of the central business district as the former courthouse. In 2018 the building and the square were included as contributing properties in the Osceola Commercial Historic District listed on the National Register of Historic Places.
