= Masonic Building (Osceola, Iowa) =

- Osceola Masonic Block
- U.S. National Register of Historic Places
- U.S. Historic district – Contributing property
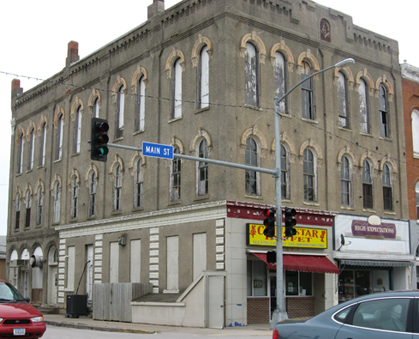

- Location within Iowa Location within the United States
- Location: 101-103 South Main St. Osceola, Iowa
- Coordinates: 41°02′05″N 93°45′55″W
- Area: less than one acre
- Built: 1872
- Architect: O. J. King
- Architectural style: Italianate
- Part of: Osceola Commercial Historic District (ID100001971)
- NRHP reference No.: 10000421
- Added to NRHP: July 6, 2010

The Masonic Building, also called the Burrows Block, Bank Block, and Masonic Temple stands on the public square in Osceola, Iowa, United States. It was constructed by banker A.H. Burrows in 1872. The upper stories of this Italianate building were used by Osceola Lodge No. 77 of the Ancient Free & Accepted Masons, and the main floor was a bank and hardware store. This building has been placed on Preservation Iowa’s Most Endangered list because of its poor repair and lack of preservation plan. It was individually listed on the National Register of Historic Places in 2010. In 2018 it was included as a contributing property in the Osceola Commercial Historic District.
