= Marcellus Luther and Julia Protzman Temple House =

Historic house in Iowa, United States

- U.S. National Register of Historic Places
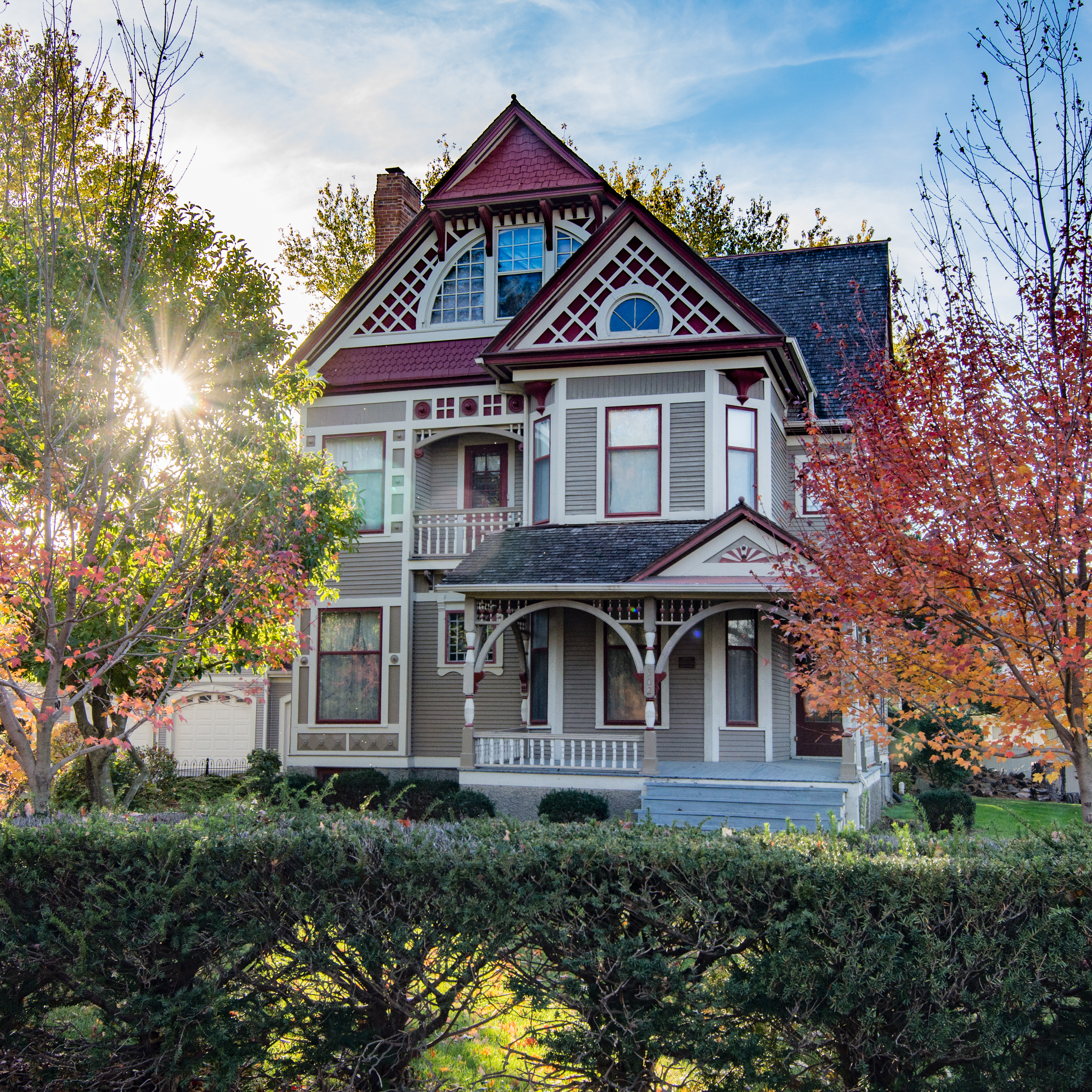

- Location within Iowa Location within the United States
- Location: 502 S. Main St. Osceola, Iowa
- Coordinates: 41°01′46″N 93°45′58″W
- Area: less than one acre
- Built: 1892
- Architectural style: Queen Anne
- NRHP reference No.: 96000361
- Added to NRHP: April 4, 1996

The Marcellus Luther and Julia Protzman Temple House is a historic residence located in Osceola, Iowa, United States. M.L. Temple was a local attorney and a member of the Iowa House of Representatives for seven terms. When he was in the state house he authored the Temple Amendment to the Iowa Constitution. It guaranteed that all of the state's counties would have at least one representative regardless of population. It was ratified by a narrow majority of voters in 1904, and it ensured that the state's rural areas would be over-represented in the state legislature for the next sixty years. It was declared unconstitutional by the Supreme Court of the United States in 1964. Temple went on to become U.S. Attorney for the Southern District of Iowa. He had this Queen Anne style house built in 1892, and sold it to a family member in 1915. The two-story frame structure follows an irregular plan, and is capped with a multi-gabled roof. It features fish-scale shingles on the gables, a tall chimney with decorative inset panels, and porches with grill work and curvilinear trim. The house was listed on the National Register of Historic Places in 1996.
