= Horst Rechelbacher =

Austrian American businessman (1941–2014)

Horst M. Rechelbacher (1941 – February 15, 2014) was an Austrian American businessman who was the founder of the cosmetics company Aveda Corporation and Intelligent Nutrients. His interest in developing products without toxic chemicals launched the market for natural cosmetics in the United States.

== Early life and career ==
Rechelbacher was born in Klagenfurt, Austria to an herbalist and shoe maker/designer, and was the youngest of three brothers. His family apartment overlooked a small salon across the street in central Klagenfurt. During his childhood, Rechelbacher had many opportunities to observe the daily activities of the salon which inspired him to choose a vocation or continue with a formal education in salon profession. At age fourteen, he embarked on a three-year apprenticeship in the beauty and salon industry. During his apprenticeship, he was a three-time winner of the Austrian Junior Championships. At seventeen, he moved to Italy and started work at an exclusive salon in Rome.

In 1970, Rechelbacher went to Florida to participate in a number of different competitions.

In 1978, he founded Aveda and began to expand the product line into hair, skin and body care, makeup, plant-based perfumes (aromatherapy) and lifestyle products.

Following the Exxon Valdez oil spill, Rechelbacher was the first to sign onto the Valdez Principles, now the Ceres principles, joining corporate environmental responsibility with corporate bottom line. In 1992, along with his partner Kiran, he attended the Earth Summit, where three key agreements occurred: the Climate Change Convention, a precursor to the Kyoto Protocol, the Convention on Biological Diversity and an Intellectual Property Rights accord for indigenous peoples that included preventing actions that could be deemed culturally inappropriate and/or cause environmental destruction. Through this convention, Rechelbacher forged a relationship with the Brazilian Yawanawa tribe and began a project cultivating uruku for its pigment and replanting seedlings in deforested areas.

Nearly two decades after Rechelbacher incorporated, he sold Aveda to the Estee Lauder Companies but remained a consultant until March 2003.

In the years following the sale of Aveda, Horst established Intelligent Nutrients. IN is an organic, food-grade, non-toxic plant-based hair, skin, body, aroma and lifestyle company with the primary emphasis on using organically grown ingredients.

== Projects ==
Rechelbacher was the founder and chairman of the Horst M. Rechelbacher Foundation, a philanthropic organization dedicated to social and environmental preservation projects that operate on a grass-roots level. He also owned HMR Galleries, an art and antiques business, and was involved in producing films including the 1999 film Hidden Medicine.

== Personal life ==
Rechelbacher maintained residences in Minneapolis, Minnesota and New York City. As well as a private estate and a company retreat, the Osceola, Wisconsin, property serves as an organic farm cultivating flowers and plants while also operating a distillery for the IN products. The farm and home are solar powered.

Rechelbacher was divorced with two children, a son Peter and a daughter Nicole. Nicole is a married mother of three, and former accessories and clothing designer for Aveda. Peter is married with a son, and provided expertise in finance, and was president of Intelligent Nutrients while at Aveda.

Horst lived and worked with his long-time companion, wife, and former vice president of marketing and creative for Aveda, Kiran Stordalen.

Rechelbacher died from complications of pancreatic cancer on February 15, 2014, at the age of 72 at his home in Osceola, Wisconsin.

== Books ==
- Rejuvenation: a wellness guide for women and men. Published 1987, Harper & Row. (ISBN 0-7225-1072-1)
- Aveda Rituals: a daily guide to natural health and beauty. Published 1999, Henry Holt. (ISBN 0-8050-5800-1)
- Minding Your Business: Profits that Restore The Planet. Published 2008, Earth Aware Editions. (ISBN 1601090129)
- Alivelihood: The Art of Sustainable Success. Published 2006, HMR Publishing. (ISBN 0-9772677-0-9)
