= Cascade Falls (Osceola) =

Waterfall in Wisconsin

- Interactive map of Cascade Falls
- Location: Osceola, Wisconsin
- Coordinates: 45.319341°N 92.706729°W
- Total height: 25 ft (7.6 m)
- Number of drops: 1
- Total width: Crest: 30 ft (9.1 m)
- Watercourse: Osceola Creek

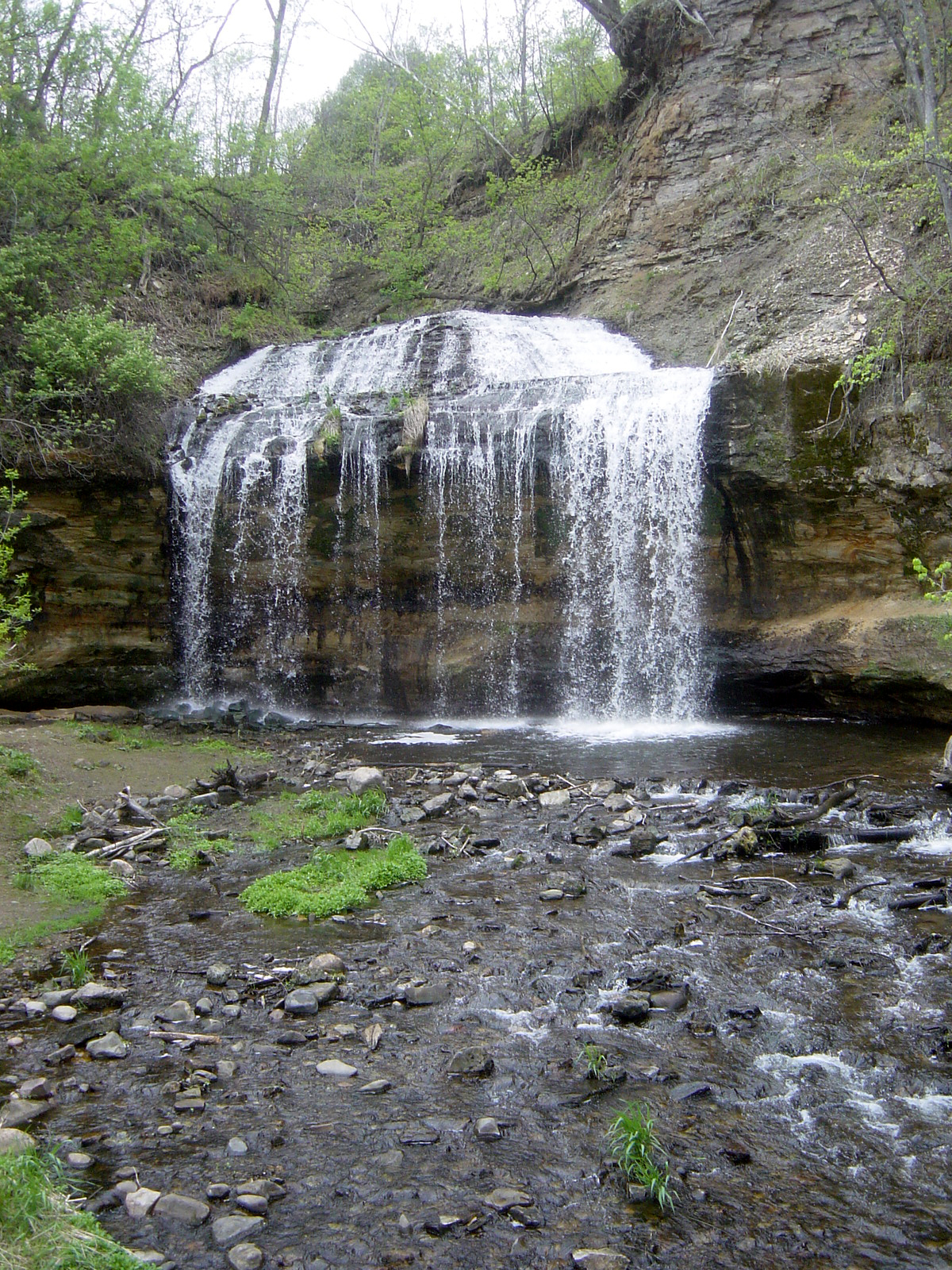
Cascade Falls, located in downtown Osceola, Wisconsin on Osceola Creek, are 25 ft (7.6 m) high and 30 ft (9.1 m) wide.

Cascade Falls is a waterfall in the small town of Osceola, Wisconsin. The water source for Cascade Falls is the Osceola Creek which runs through the Osceola Mill Pond and then flows into the St. Croix River (Wisconsin-Minnesota).

== Characteristics ==
The structure of the Cascade Falls has an undercutting knickpoint. The knick point is created by the flow and splash of water, which will eventually cause the base of the water fall to erode and eventually become unstable enough to collapse.

== Geology ==
The Cascade Falls were carved out by the St. Croix River which is much larger. The St. Croix River created a canyon which developed the Osceola Creek and the smaller Geiger Falls in the same area.

== History ==
William Kent discovered the Cascade Falls in 1884. The waterfall is what attracted settlers and caused the founding of the village Osceola.

== Tourism ==
One of the main attractions of Osceola is the Cascade Falls. In July 2013, the village of Osceola put up LED lighting at Cascade Falls, Geiger Falls and Gristmill and Mill Pond parks. The lighting can mimic the light of a full moon or change for the season. The lights were installed to increase tourism and make it easier to enjoy the water at night.
