= Cushing Land Agency Building =

- U.S. National Register of Historic Places
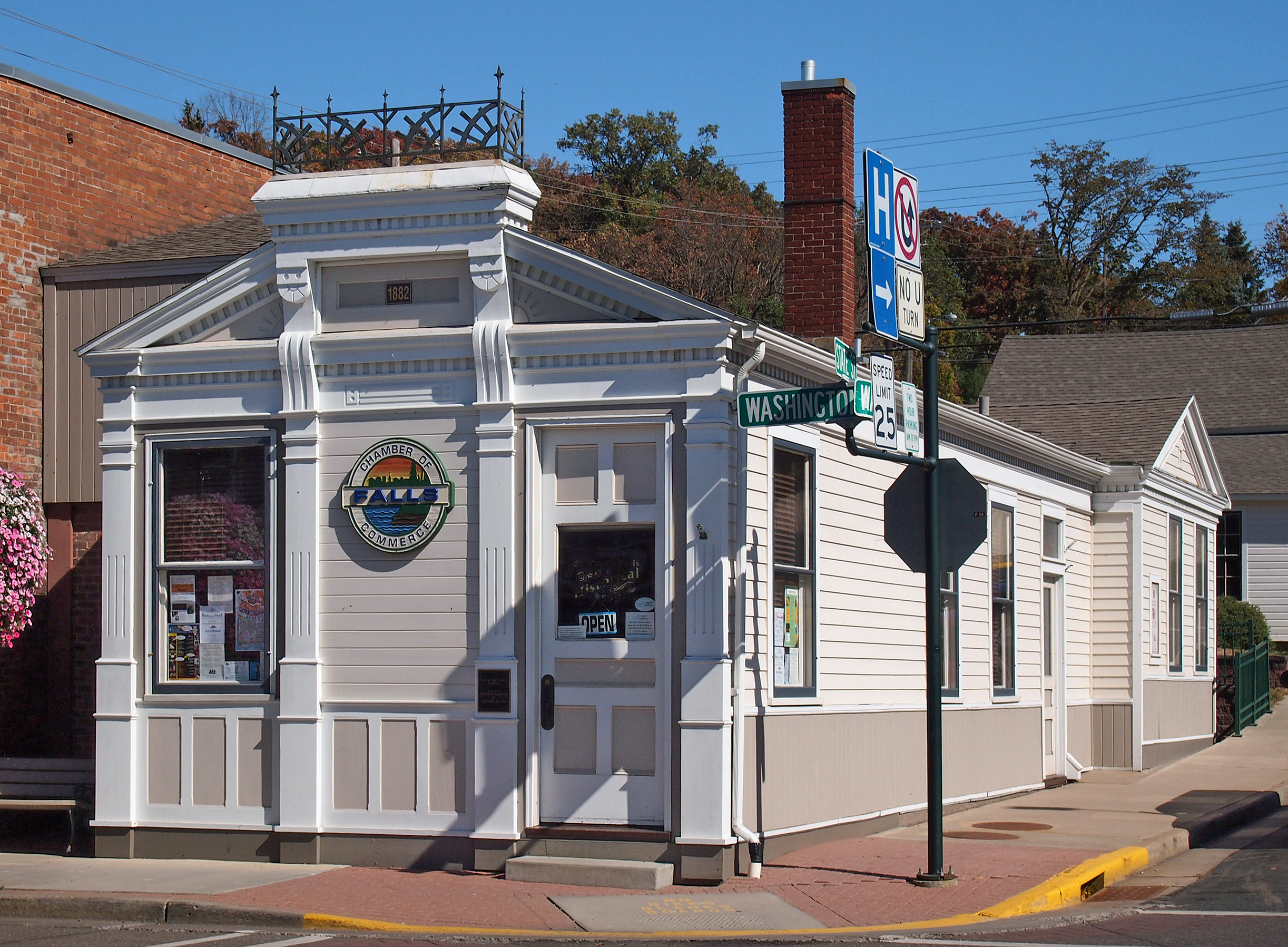
- Cushing Land Agency Building

- Location within Wisconsin Location within the United States
- Location: 106 S. Washington St. St. Croix Falls, Wisconsin
- Coordinates: 45°24′37″N 92°38′37″W
- Area: less than one acre
- Built: 1882
- Architect: Abraham M. Radcliffe
- Architectural style: Queen Anne/Eastlake
- NRHP reference No.: 05000955
- Added to NRHP: September 1, 2005

The Cushing Land Agency Building is located in St. Croix Falls, Wisconsin. It was added to the National Register of Historic Places in 2005.

== History ==
The Cushing Land Agency was created in 1854 by U.S. Attorney General Caleb Cushing. He later sold the company and its name was eventually changed to the Baker Land and Title Company. The building currently houses the St. Croix Falls Historical Society.
