= James Henry McCourt =

American politician from Wisconsin

James Henry McCourt was a member of the Wisconsin State Assembly.

== Biography ==
McCourt was born on October 26, 1846, in Clinton County, New York. His places of residence would include St. Croix Falls, Wisconsin, Taylors Falls, Minnesota and Sequim, Washington. McCourt died on December 22, 1923.

== Career ==
McCourt was a member of the Assembly during the 1887 and 1889 sessions. He served as a Republican. Additionally, he was President (similar to Mayor) of St. Croix Falls and Postmaster of Sequim.
