= L.O. Simenstad Municipal Airport =

Airport in Wisconsin, United States

- IATA: OEO; ICAO: KOEO; FAA LID: OEO

Summary
- Airport type: Public
- Owner: Village of Osceola
- Serves: Osceola, Wisconsin
- Opened: December 1948
- Time zone: CST (UTC−06:00)
  - Summer (DST): CDT (UTC−05:00)
- Elevation AMSL: 906 ft (276 m)
- Coordinates: 45°18′34″N 092°41′24″W

Map
- Location of airport in Wisconsin OEO (the United States)

Runways
Direction	Length		Surface
Direction	ft	m	Surface
10/28	5,006	1,526	Asphalt
4/22	2,192	668	Turf

Statistics
- Aircraft operations (2023): 19,850
- Based aircraft (2024): 66
- Source: Federal Aviation Administration

L.O. Simenstad Municipal Airport (IATA: OEO, ICAO: KOEO, FAA LID: OEO) is a village owned public use airport located southeast of the central business district of Osceola, a village in Polk County, Wisconsin, United States. It is included in the Federal Aviation Administration (FAA) National Plan of Integrated Airport Systems for 2025–2029, in which it is categorized as a local general aviation facility.

== Facilities and aircraft ==
L.O. Simenstad Municipal Airport covers an area of 389 acres (157 ha) at an elevation of 906 feet (276 m) above mean sea level. It has two runways: 10/28 is 5,006 by 75 feet (1,526 x 23 m) with an asphalt surface and approved GPS approaches, and 4/22 is 2,192 by 150 feet (668 x 46 m) with a turf surface.

For the 12-month period ending August 31, 2023, the airport had 19,850 aircraft operations, an average of 54 per day: 93% general aviation, 4% air taxi and 3% military. In July 2024, there were 66 aircraft based at this airport: 57 single-engine, 1 multi-engine, 7 glider and 1 ultra-light. The Red Wing Soaring Association is an active glider club based at Simenstad.

== See also ==
- List of airports in Wisconsin
