= Lamar Community Center =

Coordinates: 45°25′26″N 92°34′10″W

- U.S. National Register of Historic Places
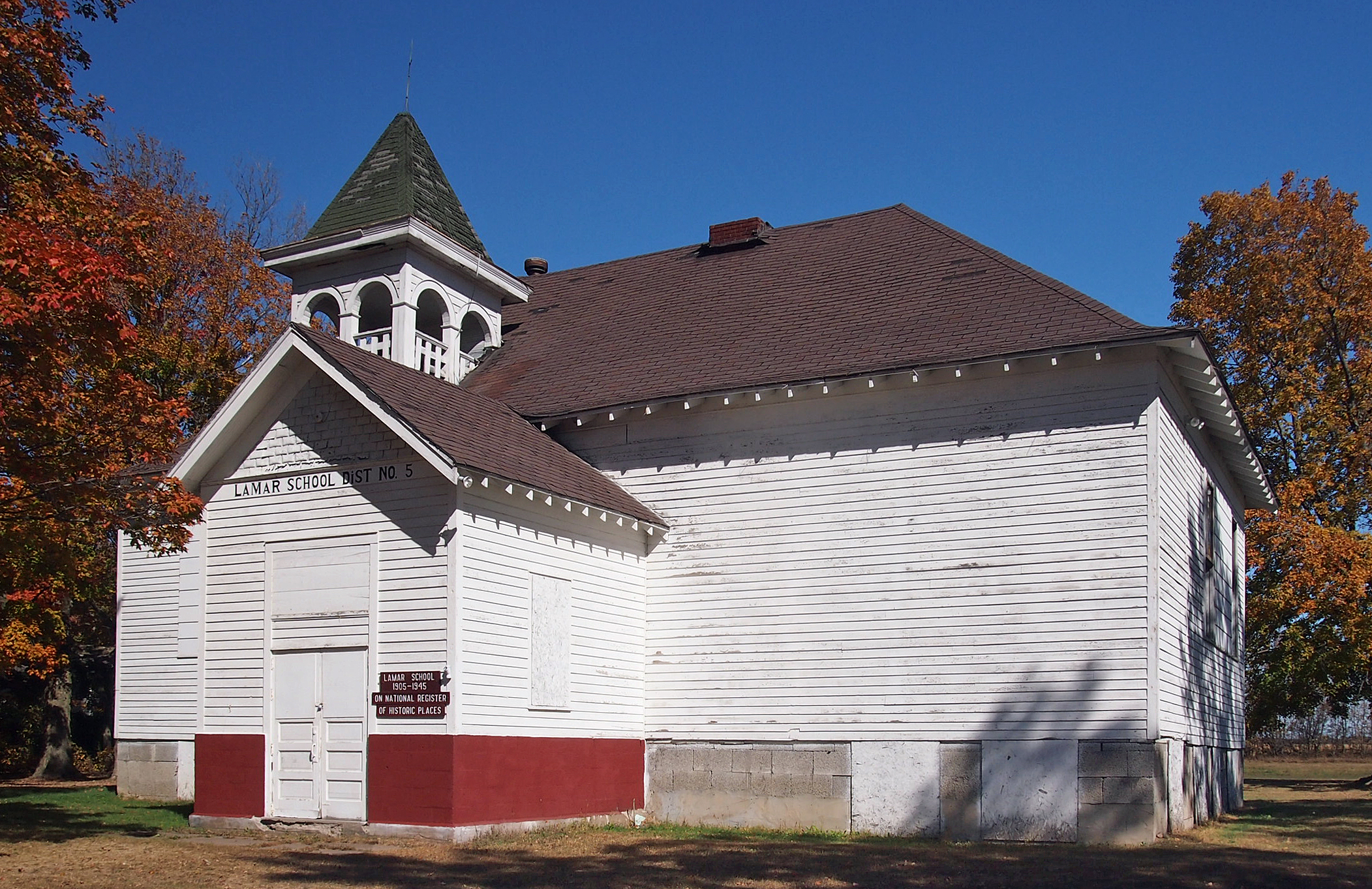
- Lamar Community Center
- Location: St. Croix Falls, Wisconsin
- Built: 1905
- Architectural style: American Craftsman
- NRHP reference No.: 82001860
- Added to NRHP: 1 March 1982

The Lamar Community Center is located at 1488 200th Street in St. Croix Falls, Wisconsin. It was added to the National Register of Historic Places on 1 March 1982.

== History ==
The town of Lamar was a small but thriving settlement on the Clam Falls Trail. Records show the settlement contained a creamery, post office, church, general store, charcoal kiln, and a brickyard, all surrounded by numerous farms, most of which raised potatoes. In 1905 the inhabitants joined forces to erect a one-room craftsman-style building with an Italianate tower, for use as an all-grades schoolhouse.

In 1910 a second room was added to the building, on the south face of the building. The original construction was set at ground level, with an open porch at the entrance. In 1926 the structure was raised, and a block foundation was set underneath. An enclosed entryway with a wide stairwell was added to allow access.

After the turn of the century, a railroad pushed into the area, bypassing Lamar and drawing commerce toward Centuria, Wisconsin, 8 km northeast of Lamar. The settlement's commercial activities gradually declined and closed. The school continued to function into the 1940s. It closed in 1945, after which its space was used for community functions.

By 2013, several sources of grant money had been finalized, and the building was refurbished and restored. This work was completed by August 2014.
