= Osceola Commercial Historic District =

Historic district in Iowa, United States

- U.S. National Register of Historic Places
- U.S. Historic district
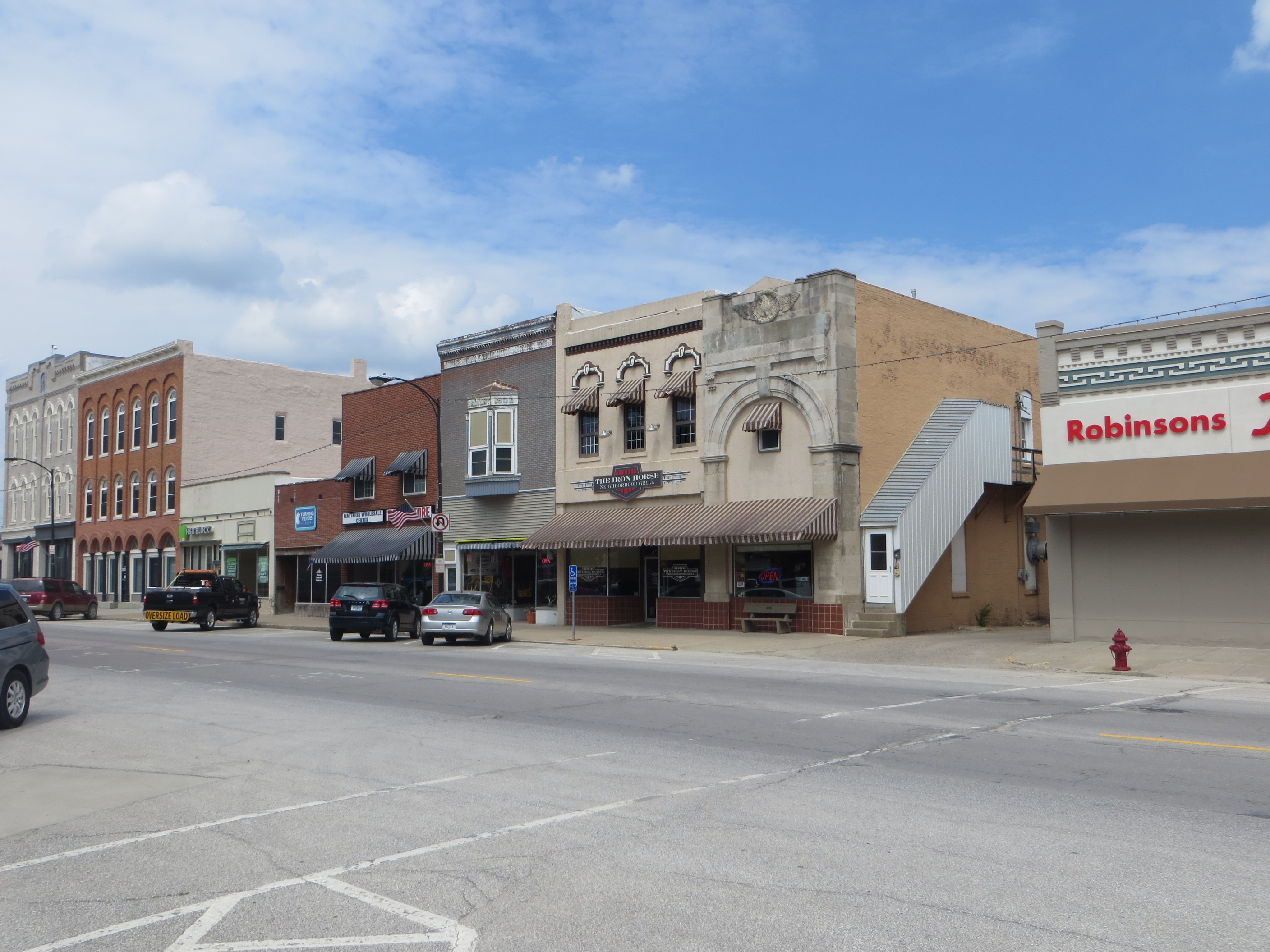

- Location within Iowa Location within the United States
- Location: S Fillmore, N & S Main, E & W Jefferson & E & W Washington Sts., Osceola, Iowa
- Coordinates: 41°02′04″N 93°45′59″W
- NRHP reference No.: 100001971
- Added to NRHP: January 19, 2018

The Osceola Commercial Historic District is a nationally recognized historic district located in Osceola, Iowa, United States. It was listed on the National Register of Historic Places in 2018. At the time of its nomination, the district was composed of 42 contributing buildings, 19 non-contributing buildings, two non-contributing structures, and one non-contributing object. Beginning in 1874 the central business district had a series of devastating fires that led to the development of the area. Practices such as gaps between the buildings, ornate cornices that are smaller in scale, and brick and metal construction of new buildings were the result. Many of the buildings were recognized for their architecture, which includes Italianate, Queen Anne, Neoclassical, Art Deco, and Mid-century modern styles. Significant buildings include the Arlington-Howe-Garner Hotel (1882), the United States Post Office (1935), the original city hall/fire station building, the Clarke County Courthouse (1956), and the water tower (1957). The Masonic Building (1872) is individually listed on the National Register.
