= Osceola station (Wisconsin) =

Historic train depot

Osceola
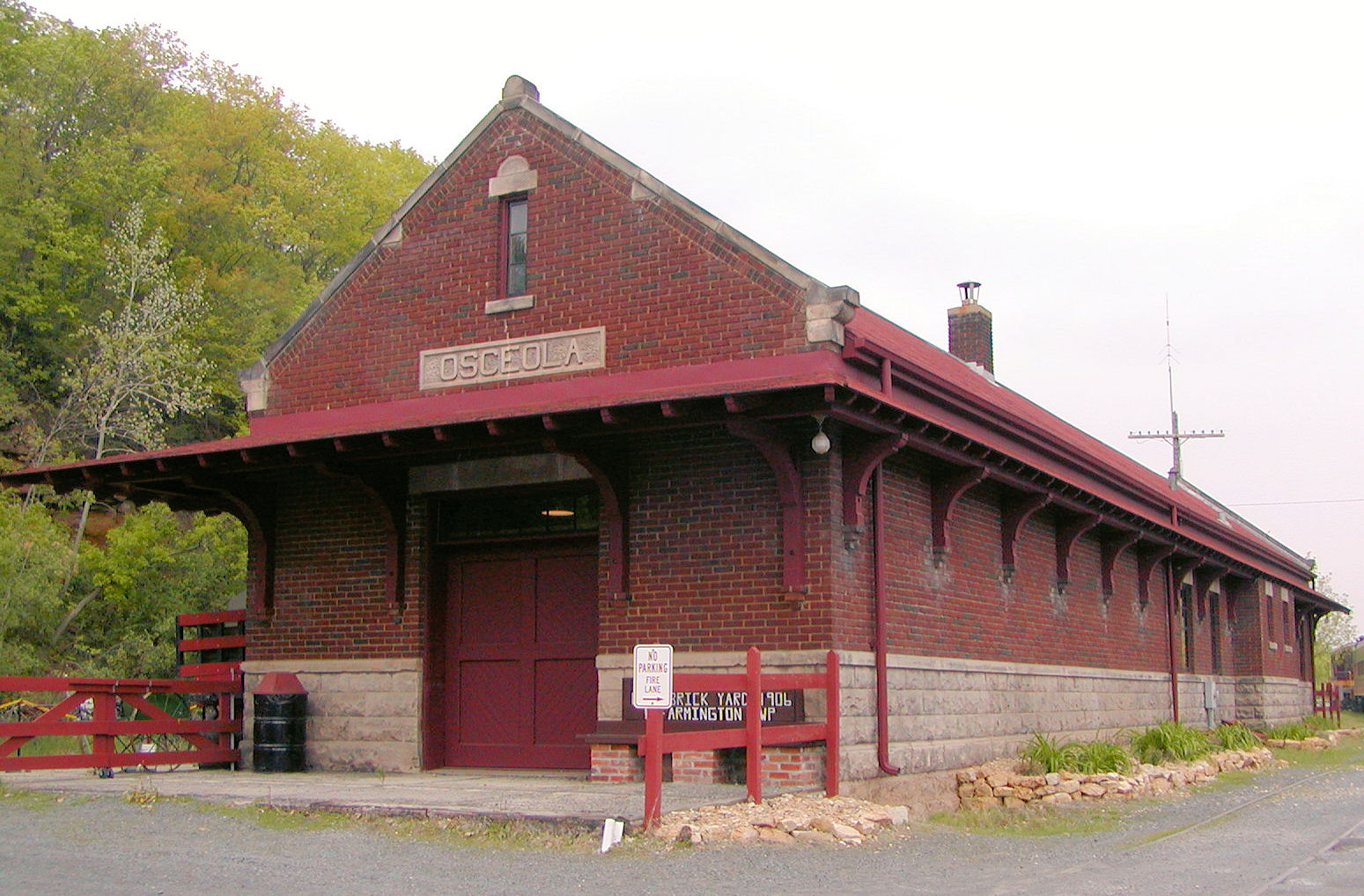
- Osceola Depot in 2008

General information
- Location: 114 Depot Rd., Osceola, Wisconsin

History
- Opened: 1916
- Closed: June 25, 1961

Services
Preceding station	Soo Line	Following station
Otisville toward Minneapolis	Minneapolis – Sault Ste. Marie	Dresser Junction toward Sault Ste. Marie
- Minneapolis, St. Paul and Sault Saint Marie Railway Depot
- U.S. National Register of Historic Places
- Location within Wisconsin Location within the United States
- Coordinates: 45°19′03″N 92°42′30″W
- Area: 1 acre (0.40 ha)
- Built: 1916
- NRHP reference No.: 00001535
- Added to NRHP: December 13, 2000
Location

The Osceola Depot is a historic railroad station located at 114 Depot Rd. in Osceola, Wisconsin. The station was built in 1916 for the Minneapolis, St. Paul and Sault Ste. Marie Railroad. Later, the line would become a part of the Soo Line Railroad and eventually Canadian National. Today, the depot serves as a part of the Minnesota Transportation Museum as the starting point for a heritage railway.

Passenger service to Osceola ended on June 25, 1961, when trains 62 and 63 between the Twin Cities and Duluth were discontinued.

The depot was added to the National Register of Historic Places in 2000.
