= Osceola, Iowa =

- City
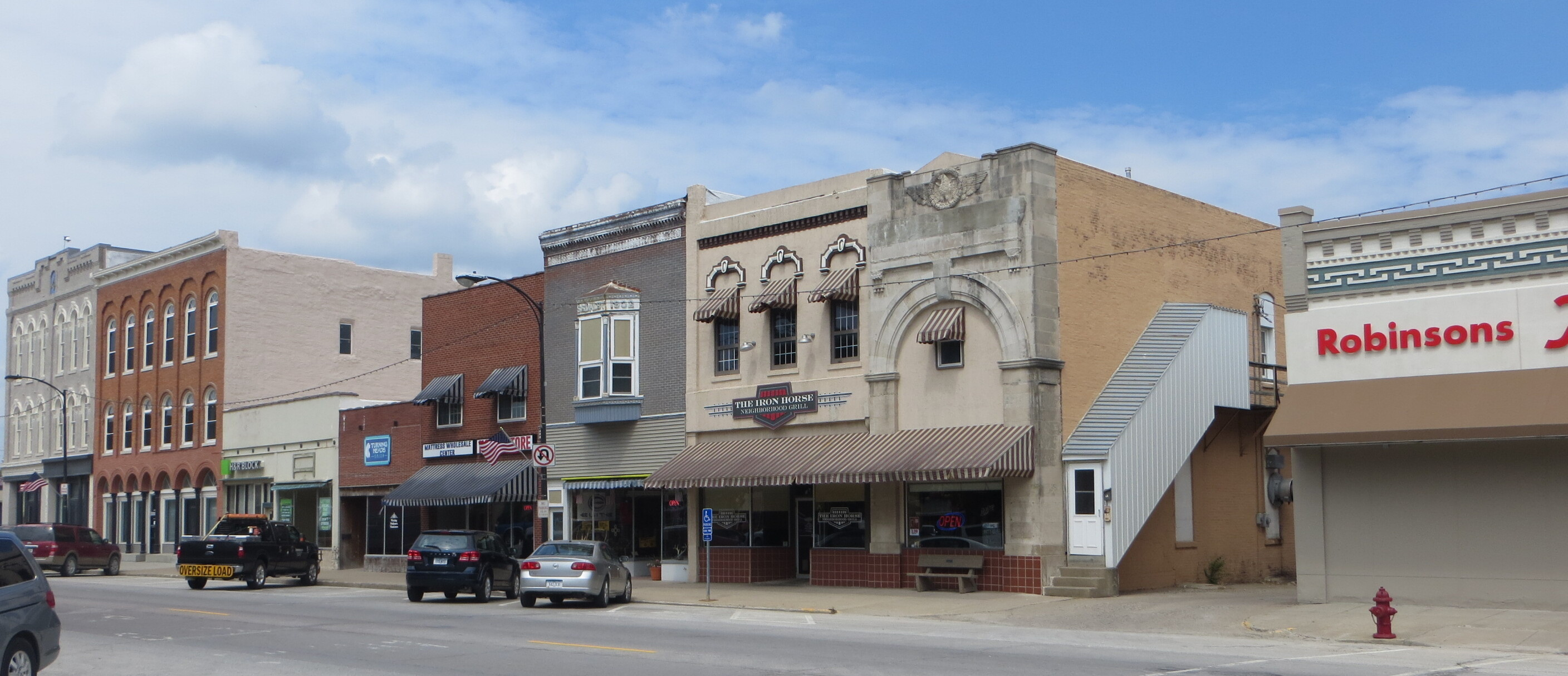
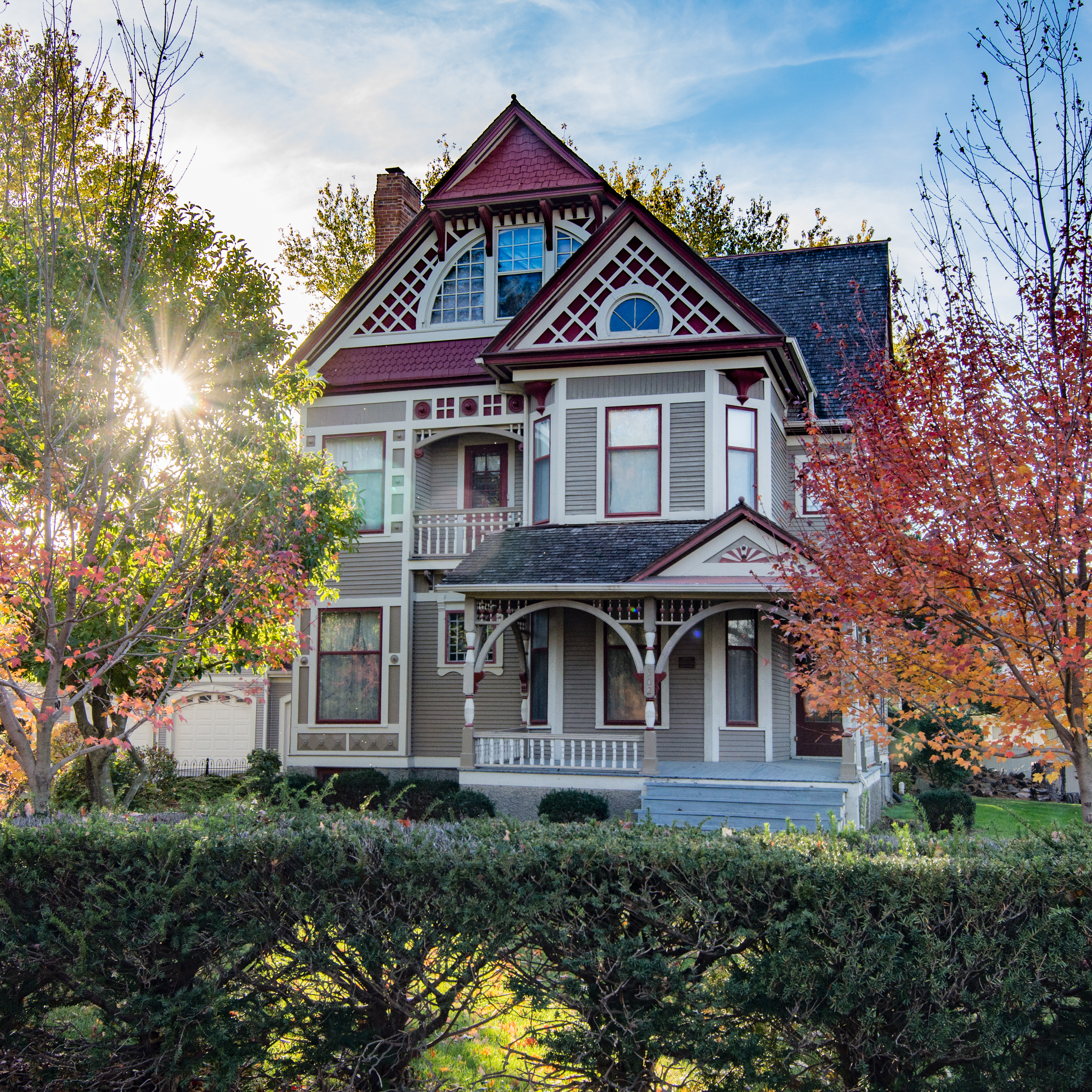
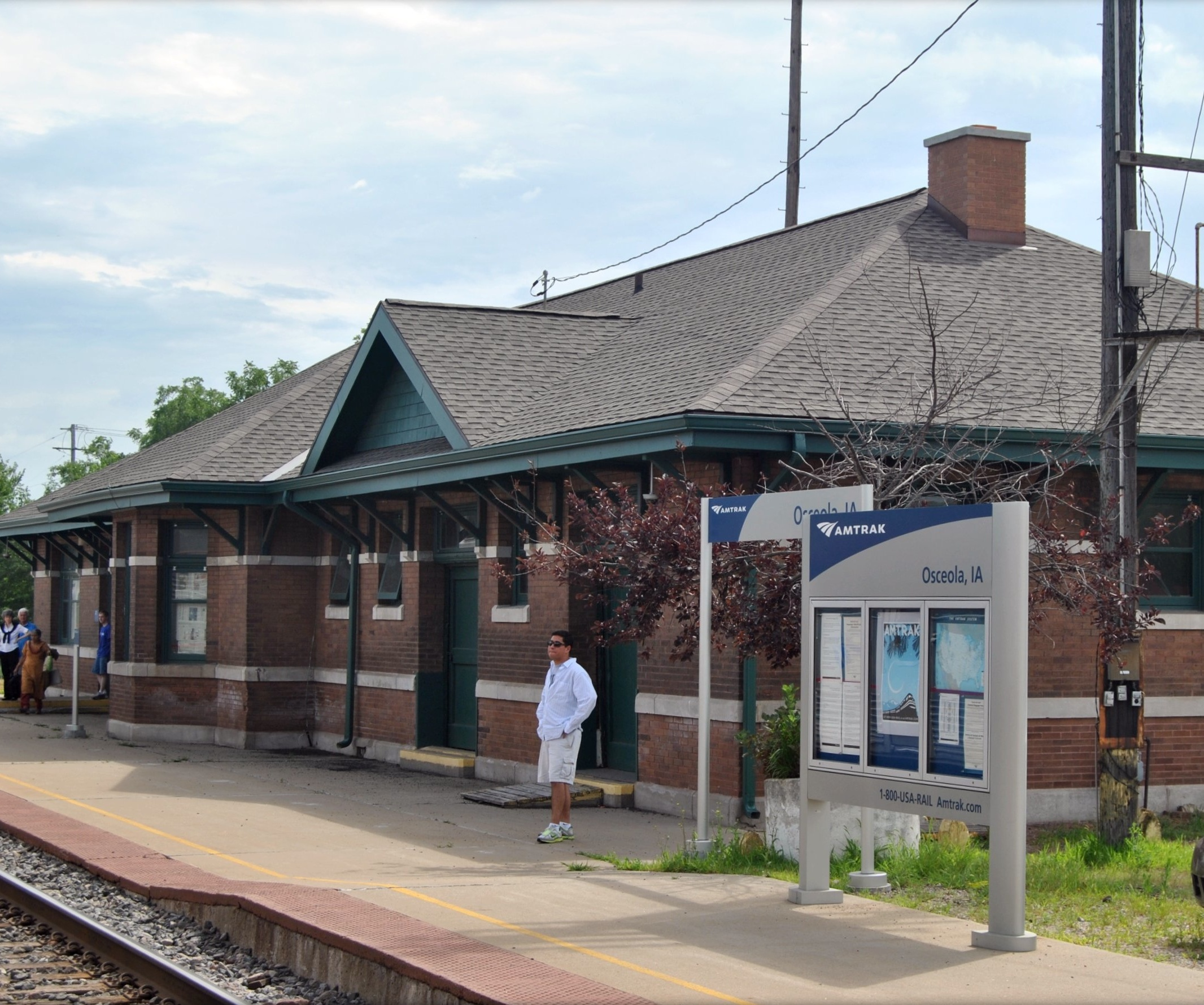
- Osceola Commercial Historic District M. Luther and J. Protzman Temple House Osceola Amtrak Station

- Location of Osceola, Iowa
- Coordinates: 41°01′46″N 93°47′03″W
- Country: United States
- State: Iowa
- County: Clarke

Area
  - Total: 7.60 sq mi (19.68 km^{2})
  - Land: 7.26 sq mi (18.81 km^{2})
  - Water: 0.33 sq mi (0.86 km^{2})
- Elevation: 1,119 ft (341 m)

Population (2020)
  - Total: 5,415
  - Density: 745.5/sq mi (287.85/km^{2})
- Time zone: UTC-6 (Central (CST))
  - Summer (DST): UTC-5 (CDT)
- ZIP code: 50213
- Area code: 641
- FIPS code: 19-59835
- GNIS feature ID: 468477
- Website: www.osceolaia.net

Osceola is a city in and the county seat of Clarke County, Iowa, United States. The population was 5,415 at the time of the 2020 census.

== Etymology ==
Osceola was named after a Seminole Indian leader of the same name. Osceola is an anglicised form of Asiyahola: assi, from a ceremonial yaupon holly tea or "black drink" and yaholi, the name of a Creek god intoned when the drink was served.

== History ==
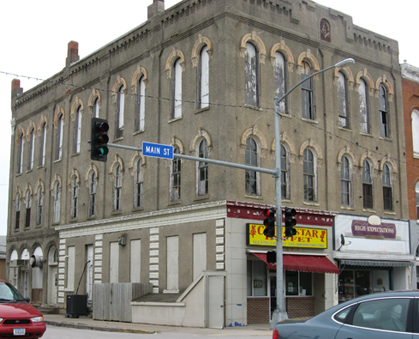
The historic and endangered Masonic Building

In 1872, the Masonic Building was built on the public square in Osceola. The Italianate building was used by Osceola Lodge No. 77 of the Ancient Free & Accepted Masons, and the main floor was a bank and hardware store.

In December 2023, Osceola City Administrator Ty Wheeler urged residents to switch from using tap water to bottled water as extreme drought affected West Lake. In February 2024, the Clarke Community School District shut off drinking water in all its buildings due to a severe drought in Osceola.

== Geography ==
Osceola is located at the junction of Interstate 35 and U.S. Routes 34 and 69. It lies 35 miles (56 km) north of the Missouri border, and approximately 40 mi (64 km) south of Des Moines.

According to the United States Census Bureau, the city has a total area of 6.68 square miles (17.30 km^{2}), of which 6.48 square miles (16.78 km^{2}) is land and 0.20 square miles (0.52 km^{2}) is water.

=== Climate ===
According to the Köppen Climate Classification system, Osceola has a hot-summer humid continental climate, abbreviated "Dfa" on climate maps.

Climate data for Osceola, Iowa, 1991–2020 normals, extremes 1894–present
Month	Jan	Feb	Mar	Apr	May	Jun	Jul	Aug	Sep	Oct	Nov	Dec	Year
Record high °F (°C)	68 (20)	75 (24)	87 (31)	90 (32)	100 (38)	102 (39)	107 (42)	105 (41)	103 (39)	94 (34)	82 (28)	74 (23)	107 (42)
Mean maximum °F (°C)	54.6 (12.6)	59.7 (15.4)	74.5 (23.6)	82.0 (27.8)	87.8 (31.0)	92.4 (33.6)	96.5 (35.8)	95.1 (35.1)	91.1 (32.8)	83.8 (28.8)	70.4 (21.3)	58.6 (14.8)	97.8 (36.6)
Mean daily maximum °F (°C)	32.2 (0.1)	36.7 (2.6)	50.0 (10.0)	62.4 (16.9)	72.2 (22.3)	82.2 (27.9)	86.5 (30.3)	84.7 (29.3)	78.0 (25.6)	64.8 (18.2)	50.1 (10.1)	37.3 (2.9)	61.4 (16.3)
Daily mean °F (°C)	21.8 (−5.7)	25.9 (−3.4)	38.2 (3.4)	49.8 (9.9)	60.7 (15.9)	70.8 (21.6)	75.2 (24.0)	73.0 (22.8)	64.7 (18.2)	52.0 (11.1)	38.5 (3.6)	27.2 (−2.7)	49.8 (9.9)
Mean daily minimum °F (°C)	11.4 (−11.4)	15.0 (−9.4)	26.4 (−3.1)	37.2 (2.9)	49.1 (9.5)	59.5 (15.3)	63.9 (17.7)	61.4 (16.3)	51.3 (10.7)	39.1 (3.9)	26.9 (−2.8)	17.1 (−8.3)	38.2 (3.4)
Mean minimum °F (°C)	−10.2 (−23.4)	−6.1 (−21.2)	7.5 (−13.6)	21.9 (−5.6)	34.3 (1.3)	45.8 (7.7)	53.6 (12.0)	50.5 (10.3)	36.1 (2.3)	23.5 (−4.7)	10.3 (−12.1)	−2.3 (−19.1)	−14.9 (−26.1)
Record low °F (°C)	−28 (−33)	−32 (−36)	−20 (−29)	7 (−14)	24 (−4)	37 (3)	42 (6)	38 (3)	23 (−5)	9 (−13)	−7 (−22)	−27 (−33)	−32 (−36)
Average precipitation inches (mm)	0.97 (25)	1.28 (33)	2.13 (54)	4.12 (105)	5.50 (140)	5.28 (134)	4.47 (114)	4.60 (117)	3.85 (98)	2.89 (73)	2.11 (54)	1.54 (39)	38.74 (986)
Average snowfall inches (cm)	8.2 (21)	7.2 (18)	3.1 (7.9)	1.1 (2.8)	0.2 (0.51)	0.0 (0.0)	0.0 (0.0)	0.0 (0.0)	0.0 (0.0)	0.5 (1.3)	2.1 (5.3)	5.7 (14)	28.1 (70.81)
Average precipitation days (≥ 0.01 in)	5.2	6.2	8.0	9.8	12.7	10.8	8.8	9.0	7.7	8.3	6.2	5.7	98.4
Average snowy days (≥ 0.1 in)	2.9	3.9	1.5	0.5	0.0	0.0	0.0	0.0	0.0	0.2	0.9	2.9	12.8
Source 1: NOAA
Source 2: National Weather Service

== Demographics ==
Historical population
Year	Pop.	±%
1870	1,298	—
1880	1,769	+36.3%
1890	2,120	+19.8%
1900	2,505	+18.2%
1910	2,416	−3.6%
1920	2,684	+11.1%
1930	2,871	+7.0%
1940	3,281	+14.3%
1950	3,422	+4.3%
1960	3,350	−2.1%
1970	3,124	−6.7%
1980	3,750	+20.0%
1990	4,164	+11.0%
2000	4,659	+11.9%
2010	4,929	+5.8%
2020	5,415	+9.9%
Source: "U.S. Census website". United States Census Bureau. Source: U.S. Decennial Census

=== 2020 census ===
As of the 2020 census, Osceola had a population of 5,415, with 2,138 households and 1,305 families residing in the city. The population density was 745.5 inhabitants per square mile (287.8/km^{2}), and there were 2,363 housing units at an average density of 325.3 per square mile (125.6/km^{2}).

The median age was 36.6 years. 25.6% of residents were under the age of 18 and 19.2% were 65 years of age or older. 5.9% were between the ages of 20 and 24; 25.3% were from 25 to 44; and 21.6% were from 45 to 64. For every 100 females, there were 100.6 males, and for every 100 females age 18 and over there were 97.3 males age 18 and over. The gender makeup of the city was 50.2% male and 49.8% female.

97.5% of residents lived in urban areas, while 2.5% lived in rural areas.

Of the 2,138 households, 32.6% had children under the age of 18 living in them. Of all households, 41.6% were married-couple households, 8.7% were cohabiting-couple households, 21.5% were households with a male householder and no spouse or partner present, and 28.2% were households with a female householder and no spouse or partner present. About 39.0% were non-family households, 32.4% were made up of individuals, and 15.2% had someone living alone who was 65 years of age or older.

There were 2,363 housing units, of which 9.5% were vacant. The homeowner vacancy rate was 2.7% and the rental vacancy rate was 6.1%.

Racial composition as of the 2020 census
Race	Number	Percent
White	4,095	75.6%
Black or African American	37	0.7%
American Indian and Alaska Native	54	1.0%
Asian	61	1.1%
Native Hawaiian and Other Pacific Islander	32	0.6%
Some other race	567	10.5%
Two or more races	569	10.5%
Hispanic or Latino (of any race)	1,415	26.1%

== Infrastructure ==
=== Transportation ===
Amtrak, the national passenger rail system, provides service to Osceola, operating its California Zephyr daily in both directions between Chicago and Emeryville. A bus connection is available from Osceola to Des Moines.

=== Water ===
Water is drawn out of West lake to supply the community.

== Education ==
It is in the Clarke Community School District.

== Attractions ==
The Masonic building was placed on the Iowa Historic Preservation Alliance’s Most Endangered list due to its poor repair and lack of preservation plan. In 2011 it was renovated with help from various grants. The second and third floors were converted into upscale apartments. The China Star restaurant was remodeled and now utilizes both halves of the lower level. The exterior received an overdue face lift to restore the building to its original appearance. All of the windows were replaced and the stucco was repaired and painted. Structural improvements included foundation work and a new roof. The front entrances were replaced with a more traditional wood columns and tall glass windows.

Lakeside Casino Resort operates on West Lake. The river boat-themed casino has been in continuous operation since about 2000, although it has been bought and sold twice since it has opened. Terrible Herbst gaming purchased the casino around 2005. After a major renovation to the complex, which included a $1 million 132-foot-tall sign along the adjacent interstate, took place around 2006. The parent company filed for bankruptcy and the casino was sold yet again. The original and familiar Lakeside name was brought back and the large cowboy sign along the interstate was converted into a slightly smaller, more traditional sign. A Pilot truck stop was built in late 2010 along the interstate, in place of the former Terrible Casino gas station.

== Notable people ==
- Dorothy Clark, author known under pen name Clark McMeekin
- Dwight Harken, surgeon and cardiac surgery innovator
- Kim Reynolds, Governor of Iowa and former Clarke County Treasurer
- Edgar Howard, Lieutenant Governor of Nebraska and member of the United States House of Representatives
- W. Ward Reynoldson, Chief Justice of the Iowa Supreme Court

== Gallery ==
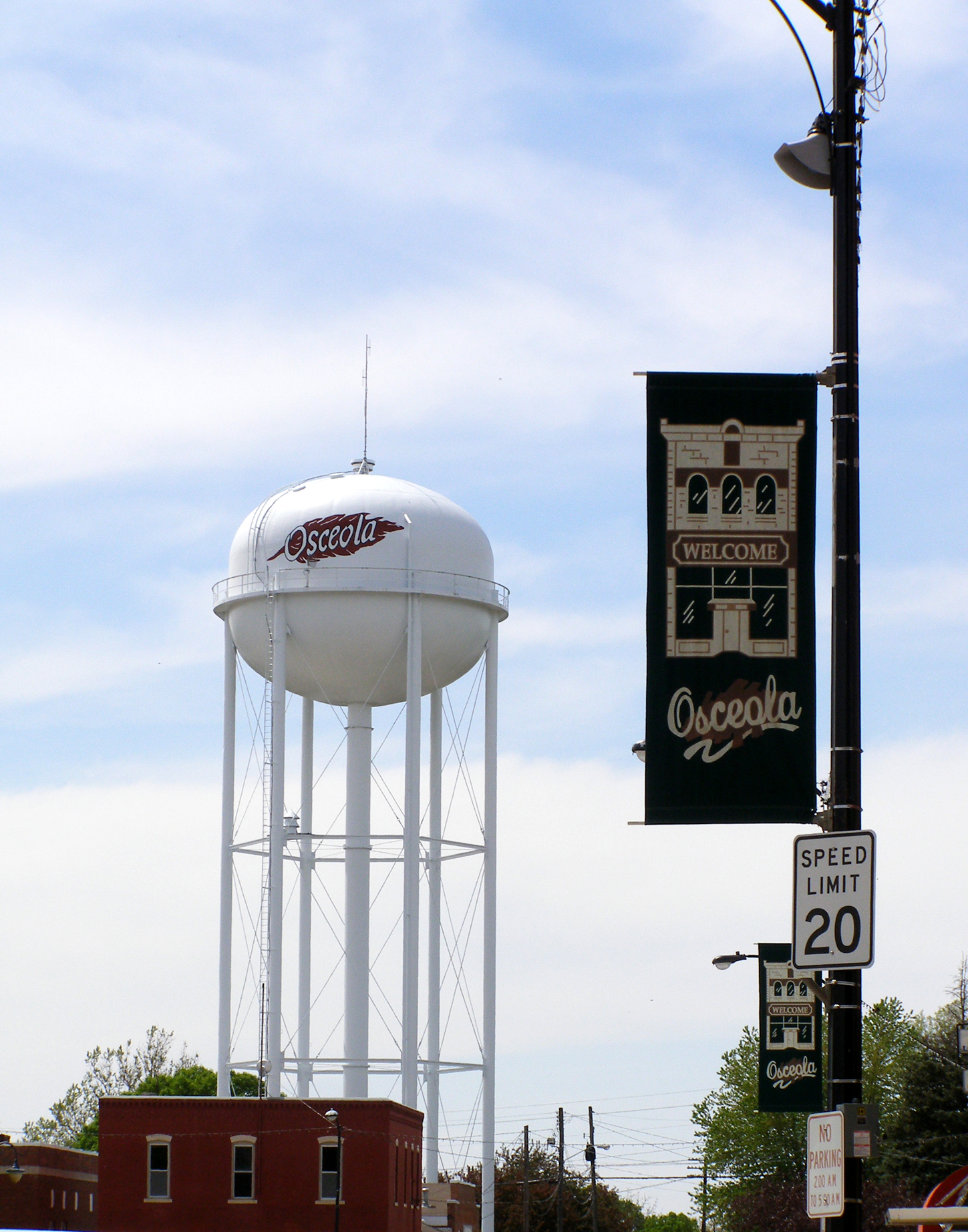
Osceola water tower

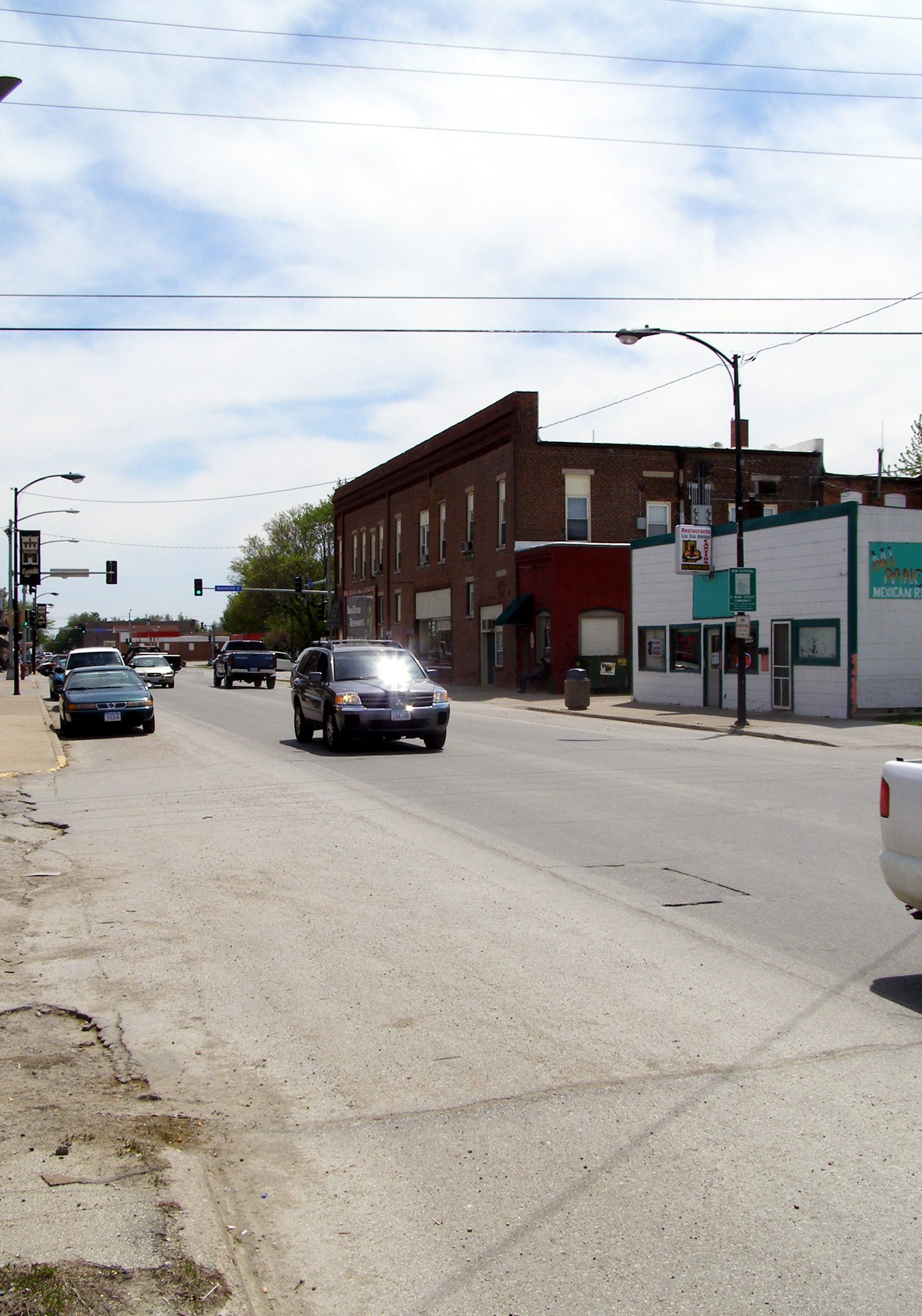
Main Street in Osceola

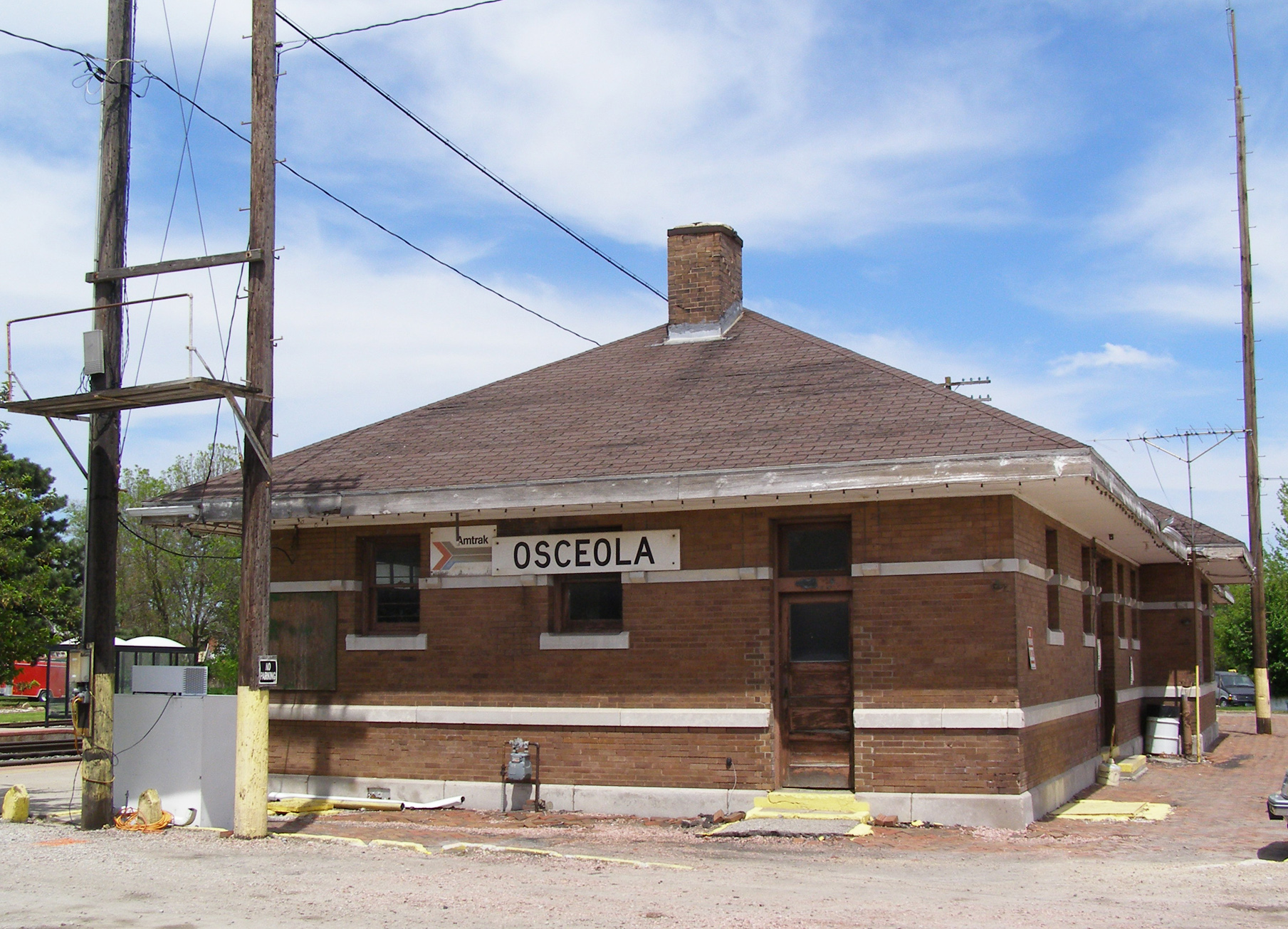
Amtrak Station in Osceola

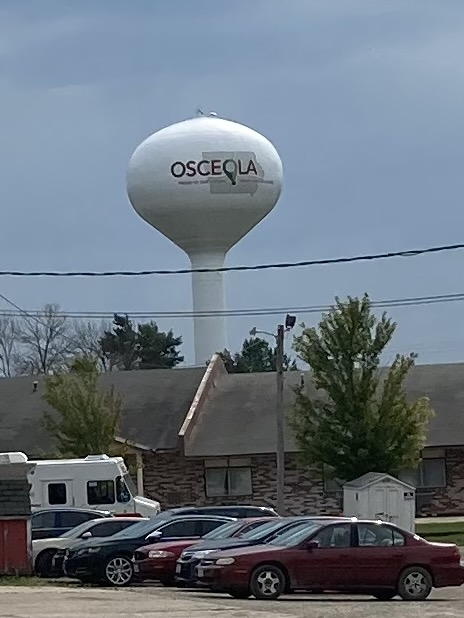
Water tower in Osceola
