= Osceola, Wisconsin =

- Village
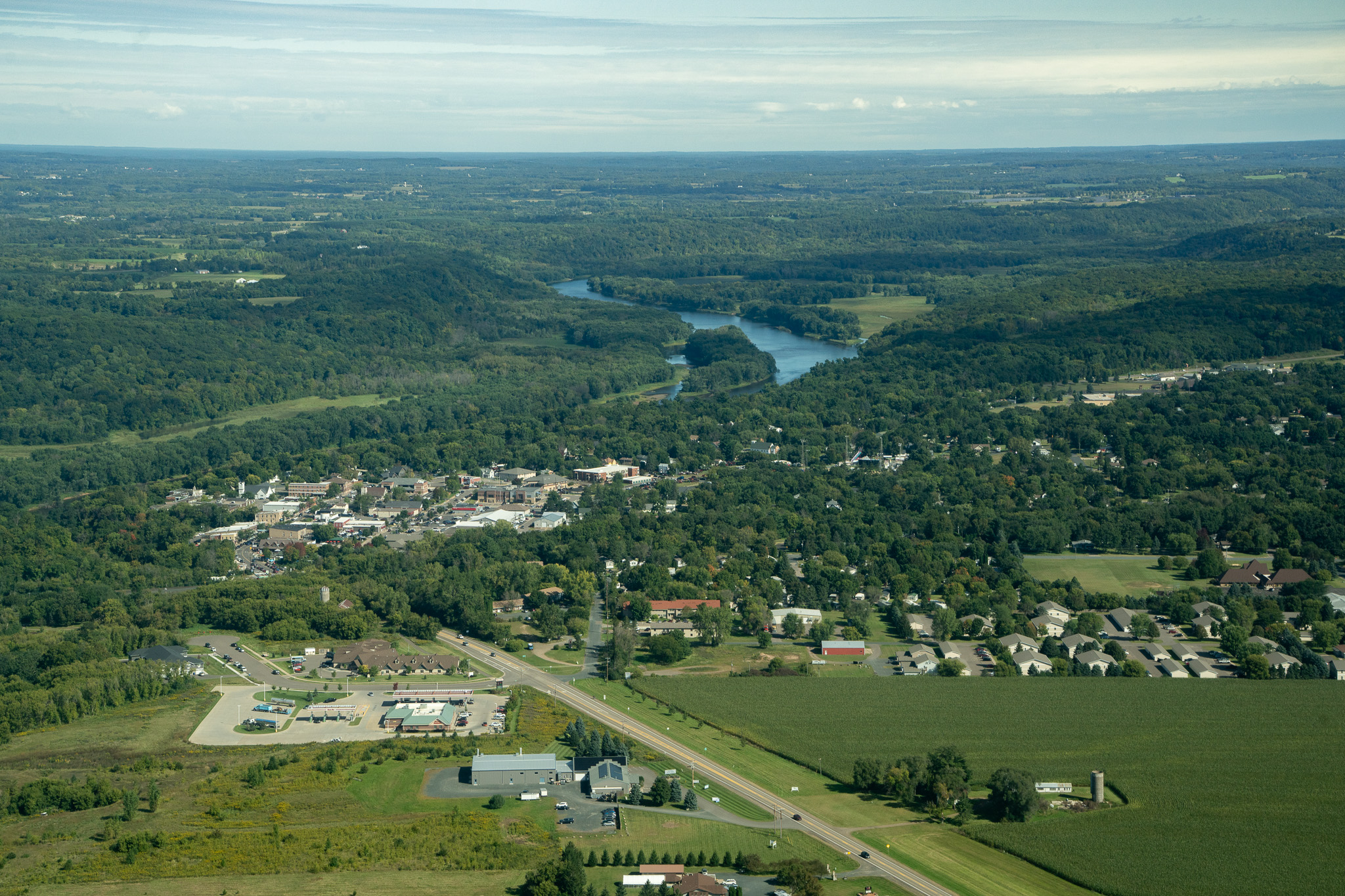
- Aerial view of Osceola

- Location of Osceola in Polk County, Wisconsin.
- Coordinates: 45°19′21″N 92°41′55″W
- Country: United States
- State: Wisconsin
- County: Polk

Area
  - Total: 4.19 sq mi (10.84 km^{2})
  - Land: 4.06 sq mi (10.52 km^{2})
  - Water: 0.13 sq mi (0.33 km^{2})

Population (2020)
  - Total: 2,765
  - Density: 680.7/sq mi (262.8/km^{2})
- Time zone: UTC-6 (Central (CST))
  - Summer (DST): UTC-5 (CDT)
- ZIP codes: 54020
- Area codes: 715 & 534
- FIPS code: 55-60450
- Website: Official website

Osceola (/ˌɒsiˈoʊlə/ AH-see-OH-lə) is a village in Polk County, Wisconsin, United States. The population was 2,765 at the 2020 census. Located mostly within the Town of Osceola, the village sits on the border with Minnesota, separated by the St. Croix River. It is along Wisconsin Highway 35.

== History ==
The village was named after Osceola, chief of the Seminoles.

== Geography ==
Osceola is located at 45°19′20″N 92°41′54″W (45.322365, -92.698534). Cascade Falls, a 25-foot (7.6 m) waterfall with a 30-foot (9.1 m) crest on Osceola Creek, is located in downtown Osceola.

According to the United States Census Bureau, the village has a total area of 4.32 square miles (11.19 km^{2}), of which 4.19 square miles (10.85 km^{2}) is land and 0.13 square miles (0.34 km^{2}) is water.

== Demographics ==
Historical population
Census	Pop.	Note	%±
1880	311		—
1890	384		23.5%
1900	466		21.4%
1910	634		36.1%
1920	674		6.3%
1930	607		−9.9%
1940	642		5.8%
1950	700		9.0%
1960	942		34.6%
1970	1,152		22.3%
1980	1,581		37.2%
1990	2,075		31.2%
2000	2,421		16.7%
2010	2,568		6.1%
2020	2,765		7.7%
U.S. Decennial Census

=== 2020 census ===
As of the census of 2020, there were 2,765 people, and 1,224 households living in the village. There were 1,356 housing units. The racial makeup of the village was 94.1% White, 0.7% African American, 0.5% Native American, 0.65% Asian, 1% from other races, and 3% from two or more races. Hispanic or Latino of any race were 7.05% of the population when subtracting those saying they were not in this category. Only 0.2% stated this explicitly. Median Gross rents were $875. 53.2% of the residents were homeowners.

There were 1,224 households, of which 24.6% had children under the age of 18 living with them. 6.4% of households had children were under the age of 5, 14% in the 5 to 14 year range and 4.2% had children ages 15 to 17. 41.5% were married couples family households, 35% had a female householder with no husband present, 13.2% had a male householder with no wife present, and 42.2% were non-families. 45.6% were married (except separated), 9% were widowed, 18.1% were divorced, and 0.4% were separated. 26.9% had never married. 17.3% of the population was 65 years or older. 6.2% were veterans.

The median age in the village was 37.1 years. The average household income was $50,938 and 13.8% of the population was in poverty. 19.4% of the village residents have attained a bachelor's degree or higher. Manufacturing was the top industry and employed 31.6% of the labor force. This was followed by education at 19.8%, retail trade at 10.4% and arts/entertainment/recreation at 8.4%.

=== 2010 census ===
As of the census of 2010, there were 2,568 people, 1,142 households, and 660 families living in the village. The population density was 612.9 inhabitants per square mile (236.6/km^{2}). There were 1,289 housing units at an average density of 307.6 per square mile (118.8/km^{2}). The racial makeup of the village was 96.0% White, 0.3% African American, 0.3% Native American, 1.0% Asian, 0.9% from other races, and 1.6% from two or more races. Hispanic or Latino of any race were 2.1% of the population.

There were 1,142 households, of which 32.7% had children under the age of 18 living with them, 38.6% were married couples living together, 13.2% had a female householder with no husband present, 6.0% had a male householder with no wife present, and 42.2% were non-families. 36.0% of all households were made up of individuals, and 11.5% had someone living alone who was 65 years of age or older. The average household size was 2.25 and the average family size was 2.91.

The median age in the village was 36.4 years. 26.1% of residents were under the age of 18; 7.1% were between the ages of 18 and 24; 27.4% were from 25 to 44; 26.6% were from 45 to 64; and 12.8% were 65 years of age or older. The gender makeup of the village was 47.3% male and 52.7% female.

=== 2000 census ===
As of the census of 2000, there were 2,421 people, 1,002 households, and 615 families living in the village. The population density was 656.9 people per square mile (253.3/km^{2}). There were 1,072 housing units at an average density of 290.9 per square mile (112.2/km^{2}). The racial makeup of the village was 97.44% White, 0.37% Black or African American, 0.33% Native American, 0.21% Asian, 0.37% from other races, and 1.28% from two or more races. 0.91% of the population were Hispanic or Latino of any race.

There were 1,002 households, out of which 35.5% had children under the age of 18 living with them, 44.9% were married couples living together, 12.0% had a female householder with no husband present, and 38.6% were non-families. 31.3% of all households were made up of individuals, and 10.8% had someone living alone who was 65 years of age or older. The average household size was 2.38 and the average family size was 3.01.

In the village, the population was spread out, with 27.9% under the age of 18, 9.8% from 18 to 24, 32.9% from 25 to 44, 16.7% from 45 to 64, and 12.7% who were 65 years of age or older. The median age was 33 years. For every 100 females, there were 92.4 males. For every 100 females age 18 and over, there were 88.2 males.

The median income for a household in the village was $39,000, and the median income for a family was $45,846. Males had a median income of $33,017 versus $22,453 for females. The per capita income for the village was $18,921. About 4.3% of families and 6.1% of the population were below the poverty line, including 7.2% of those under age 18 and 6.0% of those age 65 or over.

== Economy ==
Osceola created a Business Improvement District in 2023.

== Education ==
Osceola is served by the Osceola School District. Osceola High School has grades 9–12.

== Transportation ==
L.O. Simenstad Municipal Airport (KOEO), serves the village and surrounding communities. In 2006, a glider club was based there. Osceola Aerosport provides aviation training.

The Soo Line Depot offers train rides on the Osceola and St. Croix Valley Railway.

== Museum ==
The Osceola and St Croix Valley Railway Museum is in Osceola, operating out of the historic 1916 Soo Line Depot. The railway moved to Osceola in 1992.

== Notable people ==
- Henry Peleg Burdick, Wisconsin State Representative
- Dougald D. Kennedy, Wisconsin State Representative
- David E. Paulson, Wisconsin State Representative
- Horst Rechelbacher, founder of the Aveda Corporation
- Gustav Stickley, architect and furniture designer
- Elmer Swenson, viticulturalist

== See also ==
- Citizens for the St. Croix Valley political organization
