= St. Croix Falls, Wisconsin =

- City
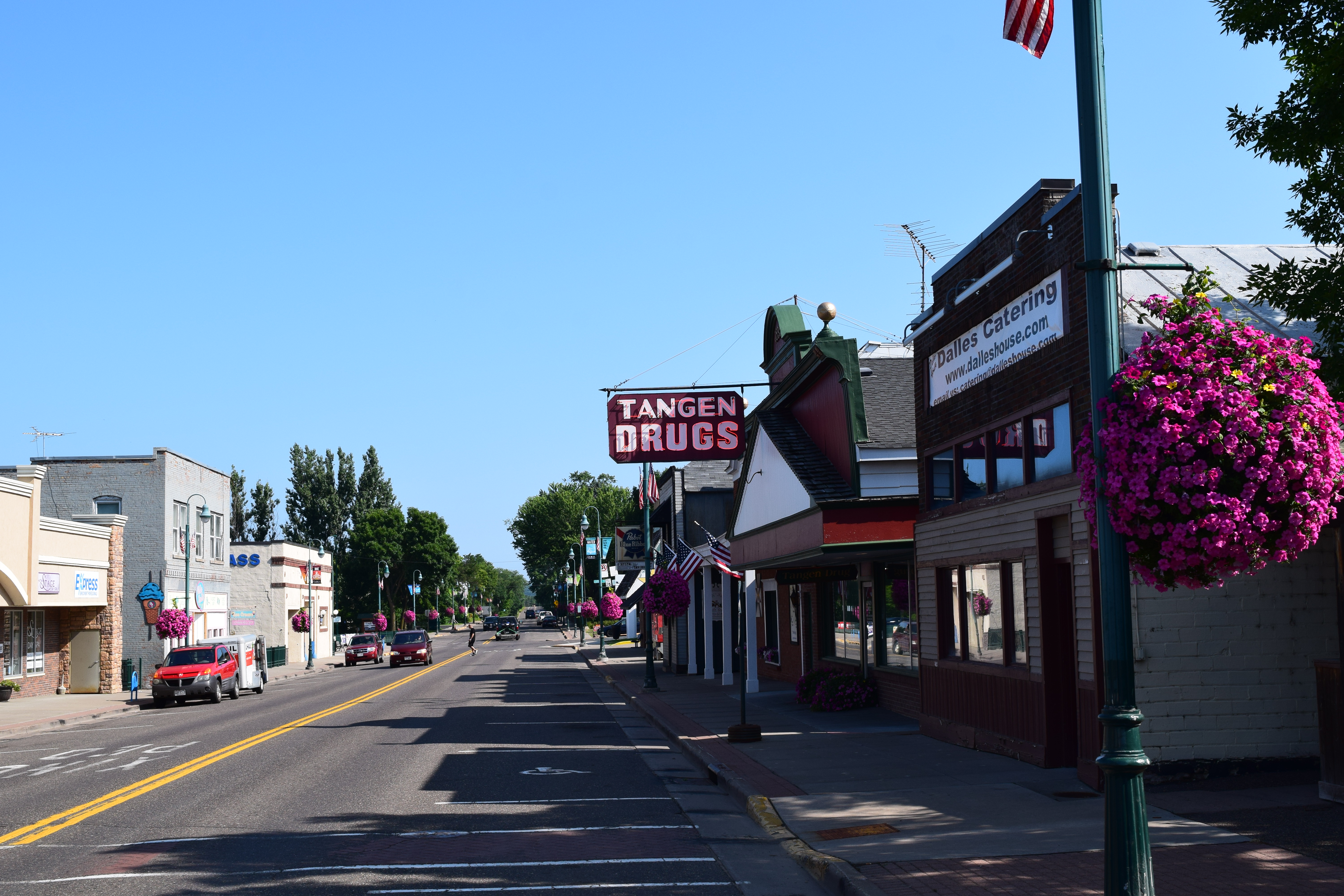
- Downtown St. Croix Falls, 2018

- Location of St. Croix Falls in Polk County, Wisconsin.

- Location within Wisconsin Location within the United States
- Coordinates: 45°24′43″N 92°38′20″W
- Country: United States
- State: Wisconsin
- County: Polk

Area
  - Total: 5.12 sq mi (13.25 km^{2})
  - Land: 4.98 sq mi (12.91 km^{2})
  - Water: 0.13 sq mi (0.34 km^{2})

Population (2020)
  - Total: 2,208
  - Density: 440/sq mi (171/km^{2})
- Time zone: UTC-6 (Central (CST))
  - Summer (DST): UTC-5 (CDT)
- ZIP codes: 54024
- Area codes: 715 & 534
- FIPS code: 55-70550
- Website: Official website

St. Croix Falls is a city in Polk County, Wisconsin, United States. The population was 2,208 at the 2020 census. The city is located within the Town of St. Croix Falls along the St. Croix River, from which it takes its name. U.S. Route 8, Wisconsin Highway 35, and Wisconsin Highway 87 are three of the main arterial routes in the city.

== History ==
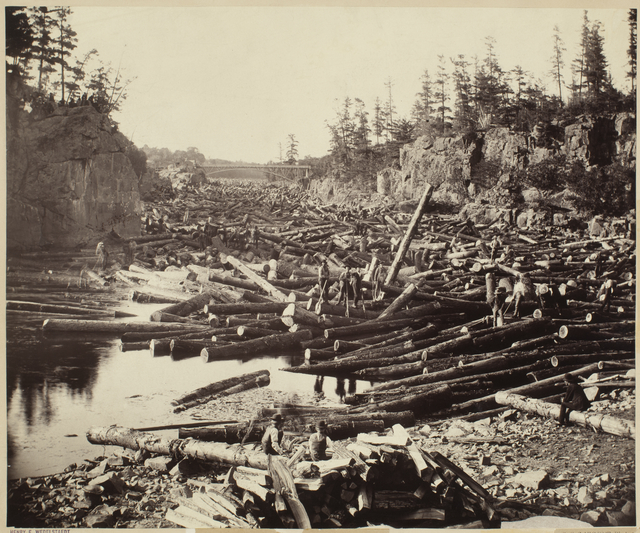
1886 St. Croix River log jam

In the 1840s, the land that would become St. Croix Falls was indirectly settled by Nordic and Scandinavian Americans and German Americans. After the increase of logging and the founding of the Cushing Land Company, St. Croix Falls became incorporated in 1887. The logging industry became important in St. Croix Falls, attracting New England immigrants which started a chain reaction of cutting down vast amounts of white pine. They were sent down the St. Croix River and the Mississippi River. From the late 1890s on, the logging industry died down; the last log cut at the Saint Croix log mill was in 1914. This made St. Croix Falls a more agricultural town.

The Saint Croix Falls Dam was completed in the town in 1907 to generate hydroelectricity for Minneapolis, impounding the river's natural falls. St. Croix Falls became a city in 1958.

== Geography ==
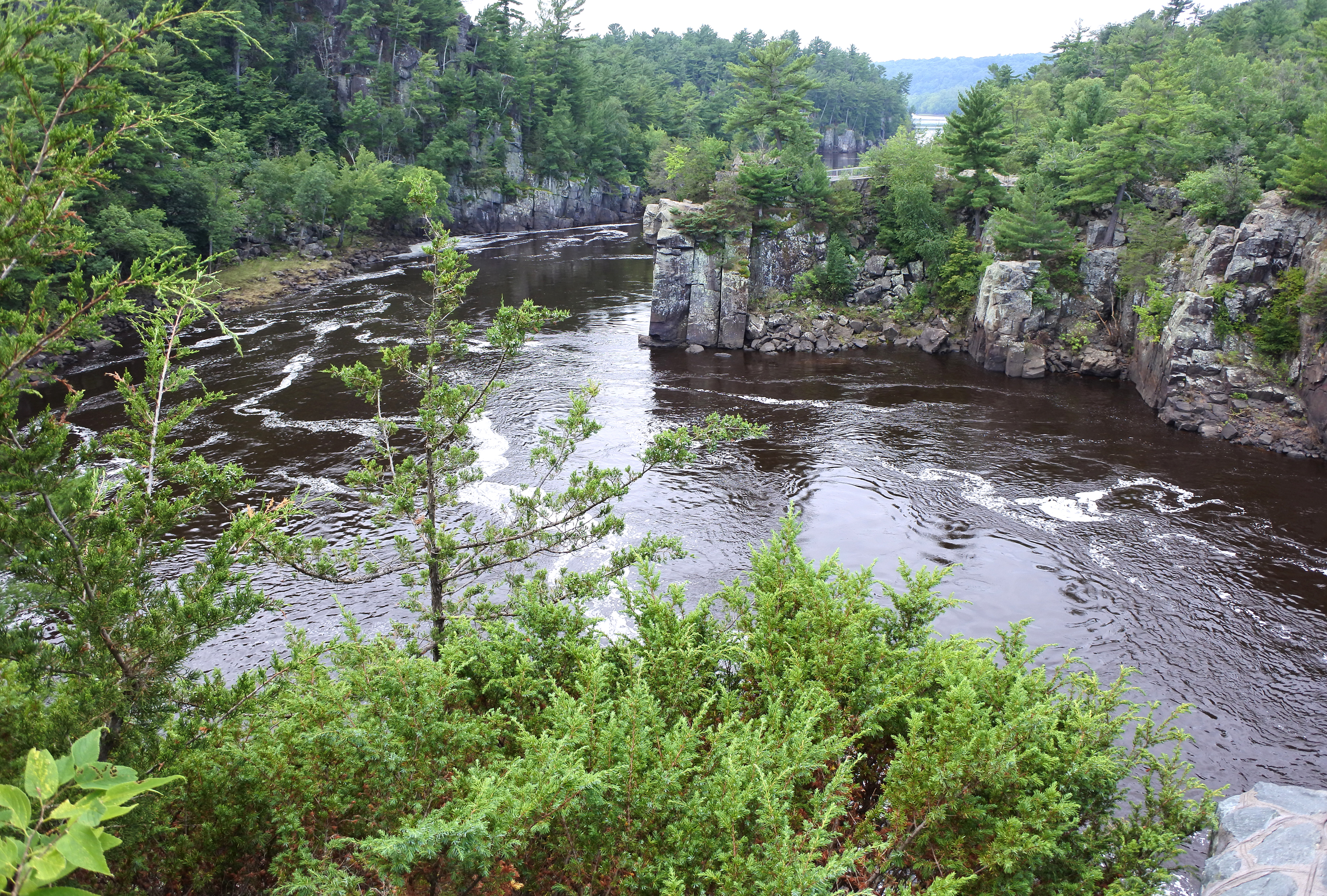
The St. Croix River at Interstate Park

St. Croix Falls is located at 45°24′43″N 92°38′20″W (45.411956, −92.638916).

According to the United States Census Bureau, the city has a total area of 4.78 square miles (12.38 km^{2}), of which 4.67 square miles (12.10 km^{2}) is land and 0.11 square miles (0.28 km^{2}) is water.

St. Croix Falls is adjacent to Taylors Falls, Minnesota, across the St. Croix River.

=== Climate ===
Climate data for St. Croix Falls, Wisconsin (1991–2020 normals, extremes 1950–present)
Month	Jan	Feb	Mar	Apr	May	Jun	Jul	Aug	Sep	Oct	Nov	Dec	Year
Record high °F (°C)	56 (13)	63 (17)	83 (28)	93 (34)	96 (36)	100 (38)	105 (41)	102 (39)	98 (37)	90 (32)	76 (24)	66 (19)	105 (41)
Mean daily maximum °F (°C)	23.0 (−5.0)	28.2 (−2.1)	40.8 (4.9)	55.3 (12.9)	68.3 (20.2)	77.8 (25.4)	82.0 (27.8)	79.9 (26.6)	72.4 (22.4)	58.1 (14.5)	41.6 (5.3)	28.3 (−2.1)	54.6 (12.6)
Daily mean °F (°C)	12.9 (−10.6)	16.6 (−8.6)	29.7 (−1.3)	44.2 (6.8)	56.9 (13.8)	67.0 (19.4)	71.3 (21.8)	69.4 (20.8)	61.4 (16.3)	47.9 (8.8)	33.1 (0.6)	19.9 (−6.7)	44.2 (6.8)
Mean daily minimum °F (°C)	2.7 (−16.3)	5.0 (−15.0)	18.7 (−7.4)	33.0 (0.6)	45.5 (7.5)	56.2 (13.4)	60.6 (15.9)	58.9 (14.9)	50.4 (10.2)	37.6 (3.1)	24.6 (−4.1)	11.4 (−11.4)	33.7 (0.9)
Record low °F (°C)	−42 (−41)	−43 (−42)	−34 (−37)	−1 (−18)	16 (−9)	30 (−1)	38 (3)	34 (1)	24 (−4)	11 (−12)	−18 (−28)	−39 (−39)	−43 (−42)
Average precipitation inches (mm)	0.61 (15)	0.80 (20)	1.30 (33)	2.66 (68)	4.10 (104)	4.07 (103)	4.23 (107)	3.69 (94)	3.58 (91)	2.90 (74)	1.40 (36)	1.14 (29)	30.48 (774)
Average snowfall inches (cm)	7.7 (20)	9.6 (24)	5.7 (14)	1.2 (3.0)	0.0 (0.0)	0.0 (0.0)	0.0 (0.0)	0.0 (0.0)	0.0 (0.0)	0.8 (2.0)	6.7 (17)	10.9 (28)	42.6 (108)
Average precipitation days (≥ 0.01 in)	5.8	4.7	5.9	8.4	10.6	11.3	9.5	9.1	8.7	9.4	5.7	6.6	95.7
Average snowy days (≥ 0.1 in)	4.9	3.7	2.3	0.9	0.0	0.0	0.0	0.0	0.0	0.3	2.1	4.0	19.1
Source: NOAA

== Demographics ==
Historical population
Census	Pop.	Note	%±
1870	288		—
1880	216		−25.0%
1890	745		244.9%
1900	622		−16.5%
1910	569		−8.5%
1920	825		45.0%
1930	952		15.4%
1940	1,007		5.8%
1950	1,065		5.8%
1960	1,249		17.3%
1970	1,425		14.1%
1980	1,497		5.1%
1990	1,640		9.6%
2000	2,033		24.0%
2010	2,133		4.9%
2020	2,208		3.5%
U.S. Decennial Census

=== 2020 census ===
As of the 2020 census, the population was 2,208. The population density was 442.8 inhabitants per square mile (171.0/km^{2}). There were 1,125 housing units at an average density of 225.6 units per square mile (87.1 units/km^{2}). The racial makeup of the city was 93.5% White, 0.9% Asian, 0.5% Black or African American, 0.4% Native American, 0.9% from other races, and 3.9% from two or more races. Ethnically, the population was 1.9% Hispanic or Latino of any race.

=== 2010 census ===
As of the 2010 census, there were 2,133 people, 967 households, and 522 families residing in the city. The population density was 456.7 inhabitants per square mile (176.3/km^{2}). There were 1,088 housing units at an average density of 233.0 units per square mile (90.0 units/km^{2}). The racial makeup of the city was 96.7% White, 0.3% African American, 0.5% Native American, 0.6% Asian, 0.4% from other races, and 1.5% from two or more races. Hispanic or Latino of any race were 1.8% of the population.

There were 967 households, of which 26.0% had children under the age of 18 living with them, 39.1% were married couples living together, 11.2% had a female householder with no husband present, 3.7% had a male householder with no wife present, and 46.0% were non-families. 40.2% of all households were made up of individuals, and 18.8% had someone living alone who was 65 years of age or older. The average household size was 2.14 and the average family size was 2.87.

The median age in the city was 44.3 years. 22.1% of residents were under the age of 18; 7% were between the ages of 18 and 24; 22% were from 25 to 44; 27.1% were from 45 to 64; and 21.8% were 65 years of age or older. The gender makeup of the city was 44.9% male and 55.1% female.

=== 2000 census ===
As of the census of 2000, there were 2,033 people, 872 households, and 504 families living in the city. The population density was 607.1 people per square mile (234.4 people/km^{2}). There were 926 housing units at an average density of 276.5 units per square mile (106.8 units/km^{2}). The racial makeup of the city was 98.43% White, 0.05% Black or African American, 0.30% Native American, 0.20% Asian, 0.54% from other races, and 0.49% from two or more races. 1.33% of the population were Hispanic or Latino of any race.

There were 872 households, out of which 30.0% had children under the age of 18 living with them, 47.2% were married couples living together, 8.1% had a female householder with no husband present, and 42.1% were non-families. 36.8% of all households were made up of individuals, and 19.0% had someone living alone who was 65 years of age or older. The average household size was 2.22 and the average family size was 2.96.

In the city, the population was spread out, with 24.0% under the age of 18, 6.9% from 18 to 24, 26.1% from 25 to 44, 22.2% from 45 to 64, and 20.8% who were 65 years of age or older. The median age was 41 years. For every 100 females, there were 88.4 males. For every 100 females age 18 and over, there were 84.1 males.

The median income for a household in the city was $39,350, and the median income for a family was $54,063. Males had a median income of $40,185 versus $25,341 for females. The per capita income for the city was $21,384. About 2.9% of families and 5.8% of the population were below the poverty line, including 4.4% of those under age 18 and 10.9% of those age 65 or over.

== Arts and culture ==
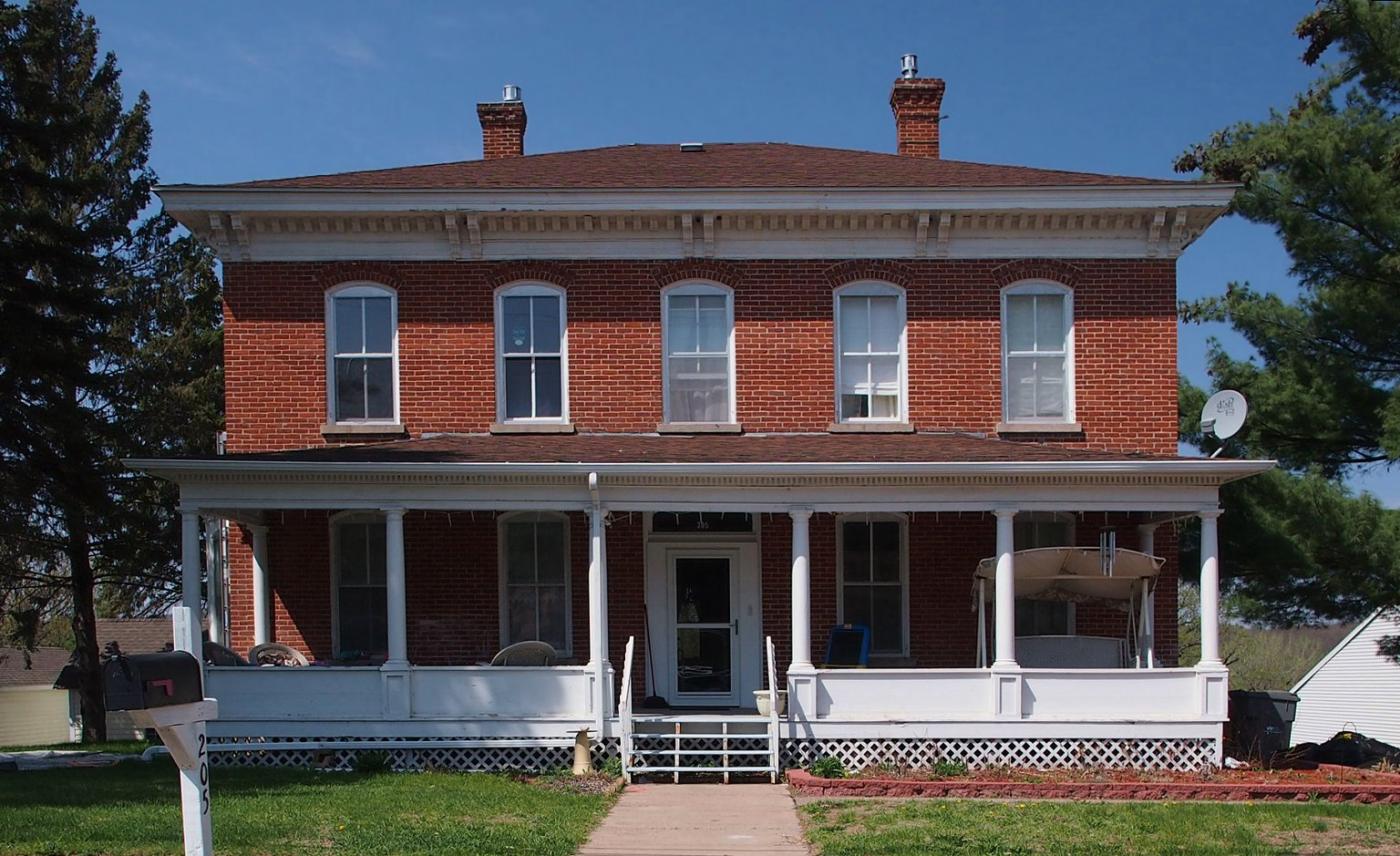
Thomas Henry Thompson House

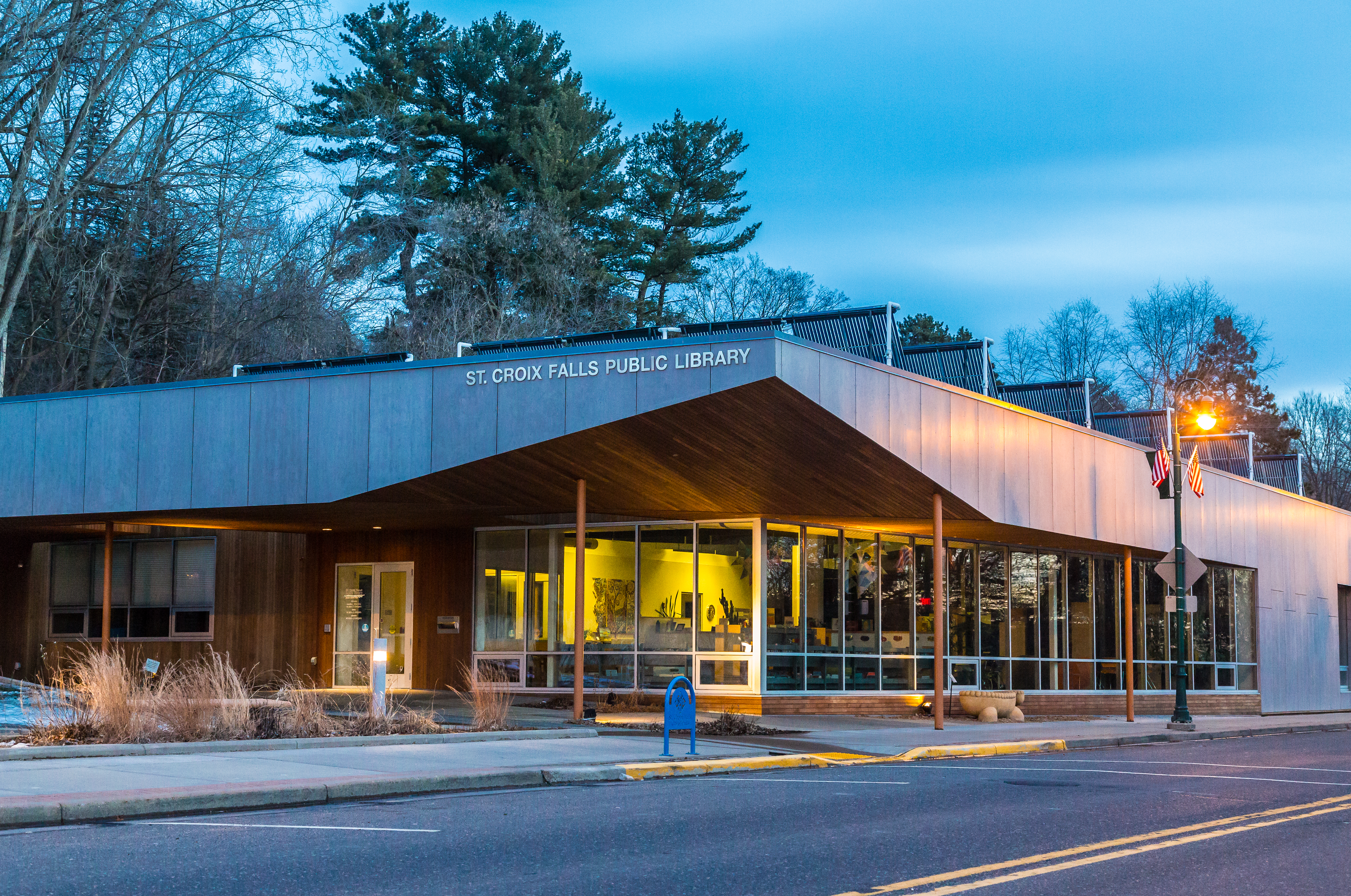
Public Library

Wannigan Days is a four-day festival, held in St. Croix Falls and Taylors Falls, Minnesota, meant as a celebration of the logging history of the St. Croix region.

St. Croix Falls abuts two parks whose focal points are the St. Croix River. It is home to the Park Headquarters for the St. Croix National Scenic Riverway, and it lies adjacent to the Interstate Park, a state park of Minnesota and Wisconsin that spans the state line along the Dalles of the St. Croix River. St. Croix Falls is the western terminus of the Ice Age Trail and the Gandy Dancer State Trail.

The Cushing Land Agency Building, Lamar Community Center and Thomas Henry Thompson House are located in St. Croix Falls.

== Education ==
St. Croix Falls School District is the local school district. St. Croix Falls High School is the local high school.

== Notable people ==
- Vernon A. Forbes, Oregon State Representative
- Donald L. Iverson, Wisconsin State Representative
- Megan Kalmoe, U.S. Olympian
- William R. Marshall, Governor of Minnesota
- James Henry McCourt, Wisconsin State Representative
- John Morgan, U.S. Navy Vice Admiral
- Roy Patterson, Major League Baseball player for the Chicago White Sox
- James Breck Perkins, author, United States Congressman

== See also ==
- List of cities in Wisconsin
- 1886 St. Croix River log jam
- Citizens for the St. Croix Valley political organization
