= John Morgan (admiral) =

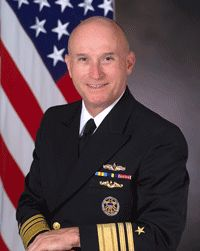

John Gabe Morgan, Jr. (born 1950) is a retired Vice Admiral in the United States Navy.

Morgan earned an economics degree from the University of Virginia.

== Career ==
Assignments Morgan held during his career include serving as the first commander of the USS Arleigh Burke (DDG-51). He later took part in the first strikes of the War in Afghanistan (2001–present). Morgan's other assignments include serving in the Office of the Joint Chiefs of Staff, as the Deputy for Acquisition Strategy in the Ballistic Missile Defense Organization, the Senior Military Assistant to the United States Secretary of the Navy and Deputy Chief of Naval Operations for Information, Plans and Strategy. He retired in 2008. Awards he received include the Bronze Star Medal.

Following his retirement from the Navy, Morgan became executive chairman of Nobles Worldwide, a weapons system manufacturing company based out of St. Croix Falls, Wisconsin.

Morgan is co-founder and CEO of SupplyTrust, a startup focused on accelerating platform delivery in the naval submarine supply chain.
