= Frederic station =

Historic railroad station in Wisconsin, U.S.

Frederic
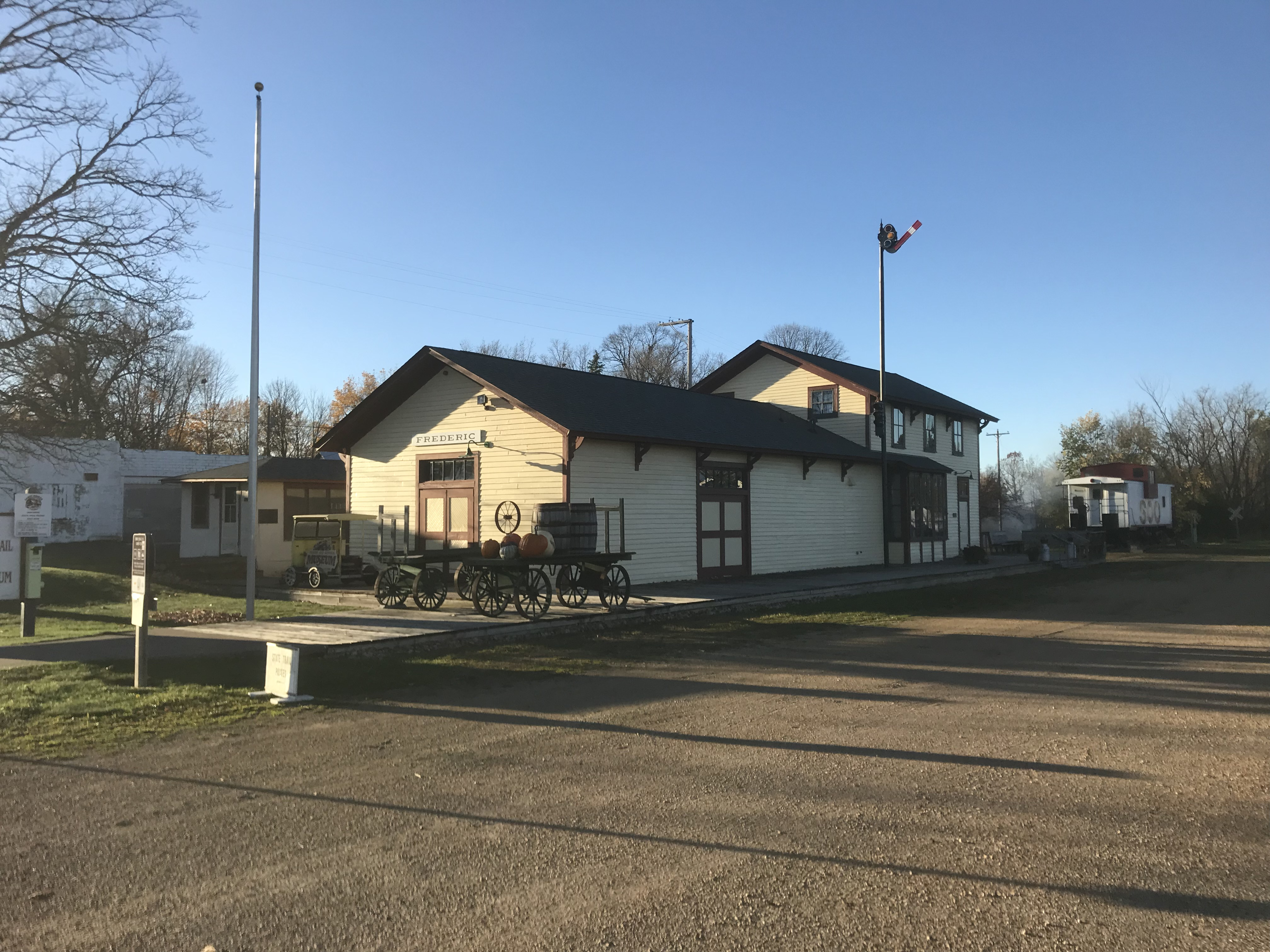
- Frederic Depot in 2017

General information
- Location: 210 Oak St. W, Frederic, Wisconsin

History
- Opened: 1901
- Closed: June 25, 1961

Services
Preceding station	Soo Line	Following station
Luck toward Dresser Junction	Dresser Junction – Duluth	Lewis toward Duluth
- Frederic Depot
- U.S. National Register of Historic Places
- Location within Wisconsin Location within the United States
- Coordinates: 45°39′36″N 92°28′06″W
- Area: 1 acre (0.40 ha)
- Built: 1901
- NRHP reference No.: 03000133
- Added to NRHP: March 21, 2003
Location

The Frederic Depot is a historic railroad station located at 210 Oak St. W in Frederic, Wisconsin. The station was built in 1901 for the Minneapolis, St. Paul and Sault Ste. Marie Railroad. It was constructed at the Soo Line shops in Minneapolis and shipped to Frederic by rail, where it was assembled. The depot was added to the National Register of Historic Places in 2000.

Passenger service to Frederic ended on June 25, 1961, when trains 62 and 63 between the Twin Cities and Duluth were discontinued.
