= Aveda =

American cosmetics company

Aveda Corporation
- Type: Subsidiary
- Industry: Cosmetics
- Founded: Blaine, Minnesota, United States (1978)
- Founders: Horst Rechelbacher
- Headquarters: Minneapolis
- Products: Skin care, makeup, fragrance and hair care
- Parent: Estée Lauder Companies (1997–present)
- Website: aveda.com

Aveda Corporation (/əˈveɪdə/ ə-VAY-də) is an American cosmetics company founded by Horst Rechelbacher, now owned by Estée Lauder Companies, and headquartered in Minneapolis, Minnesota. Aveda manufactures skin and body care, cosmetics, perfume (internally called "pure-fume"), hair color, and hair care products, and trains students in cosmetology, massage, and esthiology at the Aveda Institutes in Minneapolis, New York City, Des Moines, Tampa Bay, Washington, D.C., Maryland, Orlando, Denver, Winnipeg, and many other cities.

== History ==
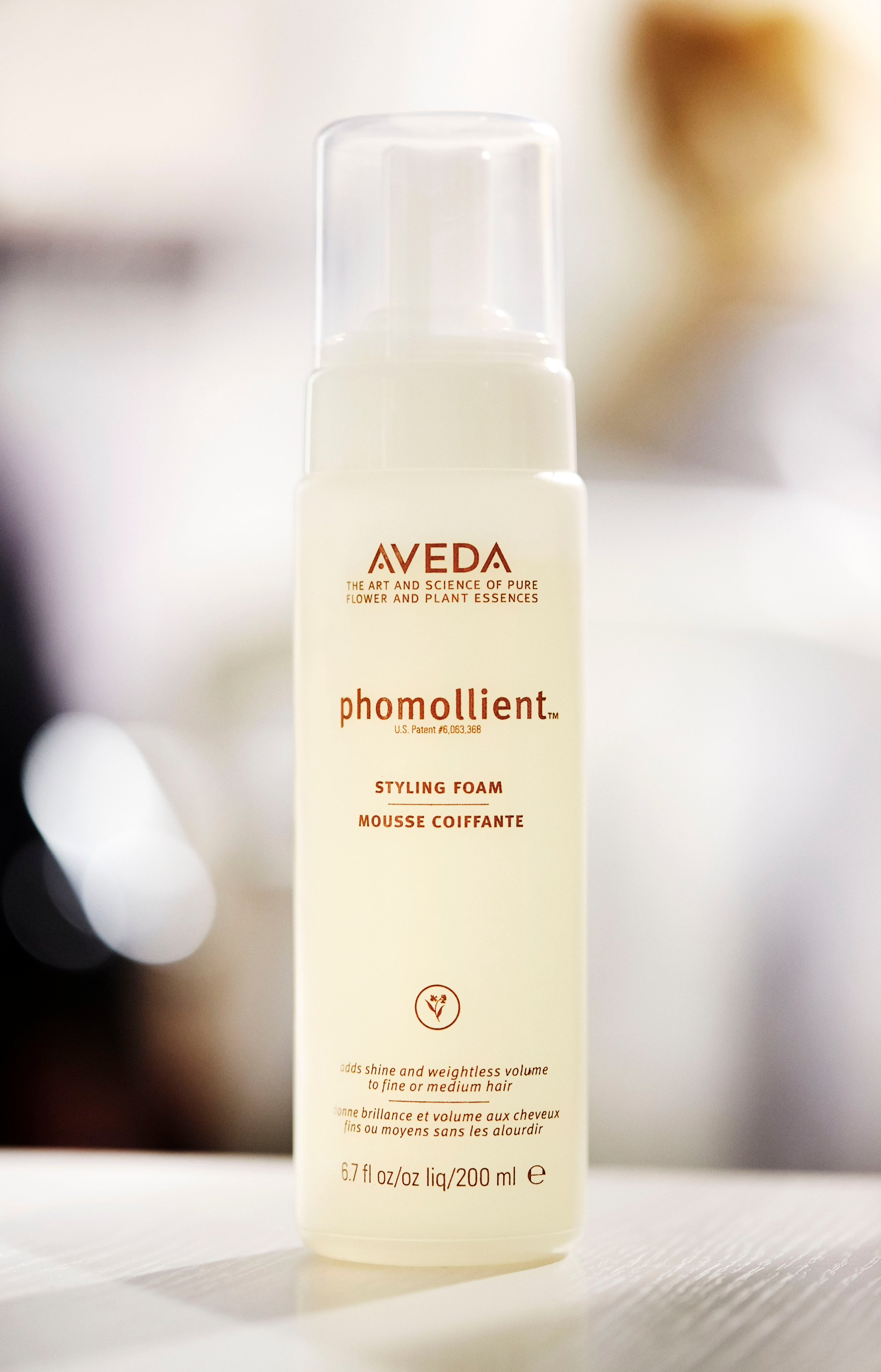
Aveda product

Aveda was founded by Horst Rechelbacher in 1978 in Minneapolis, Minnesota. Inspired by ancient Ayurvedic traditions and his mother, Rechelbacher created his first product, Clove shampoo, in the kitchen sink. Aveda is part of Estée Lauder Companies Inc., based in New York. Rechelbacher sold Aveda to Estée Lauder Companies, Inc., in 1997 for $300 million, although Aveda continues to be run as a semi-autonomous entity. Upon selling the product to Estee Lauder Companies Inc., Horst also sold off the chain of salons to his successor, David Wagner.

The salons, formerly known as Horst and Friends, were renamed Juut Salonspa. In 2004, Aveda was awarded the prestigious Corporate Achievement Award at the Smithsonian Cooper-Hewitt National Design Museum. Aveda was one of the first beauty companies to endorse a set of principles designed to encourage greater environmental responsibility in business, known as The Ceres Principles (originally named The Valdez Principles).

== Controversy ==
In 2009, Aveda (as a subsidiary of Estée Lauder Companies Inc.) was included by the BDS campaign as one of the "Top Ten Brands to Boycott This Christmas" because "This company’s chairman Ronald Lauder is also the chairman of the Jewish National Fund..."

== Environment ==
Through a partnership with Native, A Public Benefit Corporation, Aveda has helped fund wind turbines. The company "sends sustainability surveys to publications to help decide where to place its ads".
