= Abraham M. Radcliffe =

American architect

Abraham M. Radcliffe (1827–1886) was an American architect based in Minnesota. Born in New York City, he opened an office in Minneapolis in 1857 and an office in Saint Paul in 1858. The Minneapolis office was closed in 1868.

Radcliffe designed early commercial buildings in Saint Paul and Minneapolis, as well as the Dakota County Courthouse in Hastings, Minnesota. Radcliffe inspired the architectural careers of several prominent Minnesota architects, including Cass Gilbert and Clarence Johnston, who worked in his office.

Radcliffe designed the William G. LeDuc House in Hastings in 1863–1866, the Isaac Staples House in Stillwater, Minnesota, in 1875, the Philo Q. Boyden House in Hudson, Wisconsin, in 1879, and Saint Patrick's Catholic Church in Eau Claire, Wisconsin, in 1884. He also designed several large residences on Summit Avenue in Saint Paul. These included the Charles Paul House and the Walter J.S. Traill/Homer P. Clark House, both built in 1882.
