= List of county roads in Washington County, Minnesota =

- Standard county road markers

Highway names
- Interstates: Interstate X (I-X)
- US Highways: U.S. Highway X (US X)
- State: Trunk Highway X (MN X or TH X)
- County State-Aid Highways: County State-Aid Highway X (CSAH X)
- County Roads: County Road X (CR X)

System links
- County roads of Minnesota; Washington County

Map of Signed Routes in Washington County

Washington County uses the standard blue pentagon to sign County State-Aid Highways (CSAH) and the white square to sign County Roads (CR).

== CR 1–CR 20 ==
=== County Road 2 ===

County Road 2 is a county route in Forest Lake, Minnesota. It follows Broadway Avenue in Forest Lake from a roundabout at US Highway 61 to Interstate 35 just north of the split between I-35W and I-35E. County Road 2 then continues westward to the edge of the county where it becomes Anoka County Road 18. County Road 2 used to continue north on US Highway 61 and then follow North Shore Trail until it ended at Scandia Trail (MN 97) in eastern Forest Lake.

=== County Road 3 ===
County Road 3 is a county route that serves Scandia and May Township. County Road 3 begins at Square Lake Trail (County Road 7) and continues north to 170th Street North (Washington County 4) in northern May Township. County Road 3 continues at 170th Street North (Washington County 4) in northern May Township as Olinda Trail North into Scandia where it intersects both County Road 52 and Scandia Trail (MN 97). Olinda Trail continues out of the county as Chisago County 25 as it heads towards the Chisago Lakes area. County Road 3 was extended south from its former southern terminus at 170th Street North south to Square Lake Trail. This section of road was originally signed as County Road 55.

=== County Road 4 ===
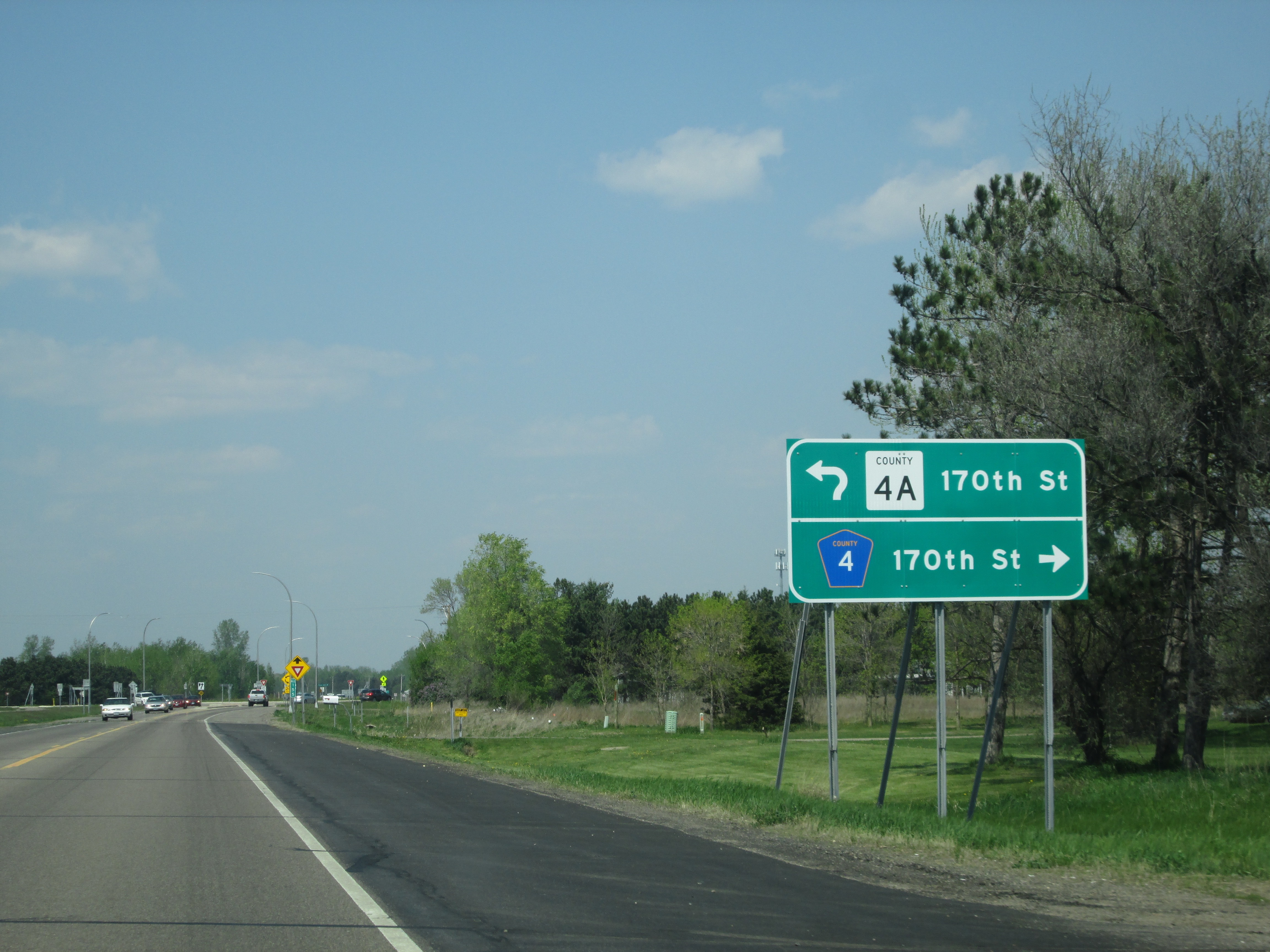
Intersection of U.S. Highway 61, CR 4A, and CSAH 4 in the city of Hugo.

County Road 4 is a county route which connects Hugo on the western side of Washington County, to Marine on St. Croix on the eastern edge of the county. County Road 4 follows 170th Street from its beginning at US Highway 61 until after its intersection with Olinda Trail in May Township. County Road 4 turns onto Broadway Street in Marine on St. Croix and then terminates almost immediately at St. Croix Trail (MN 95).

=== County Road 4A ===

County Road 4A is a short county route in the city of Hugo in Washington County. County Road 4A is a continuation of County Road 4 west of its roundabout at US Highway 61. County Road 4A also follows 170th Street west to the edge of the county where it becomes Anoka County Road 140.

=== County Road 5 ===
County Road 5 is a county route in Washington County that connects Stillwater and May Township. In Stillwater, County Road 5 is known as Stillwater Boulevard before continuing onto Olive Street and then turning onto Owens Street. County Road 5 continues through a busy intersection with County Road 12 as Owens Street. County Road 5 then becomes Stonebridge Trail as it approaches Dellwood Road (MN 96). County Road 5 continues past Minnesota Highway 96 before terminating at Otchipwe Avenue (Washington County 11).

=== County Road 6 ===
County Road 6 is a county route in the cities of Lake Elmo and Oakdale in Washington County. County Road 6 begins at an intersection on the county line between Minnesota Highway 120 and Minnesota Highway 5. County Road 6 heads eastward as Stillwater Boulevard towards its eastern terminus. County Road 6 has a concurrency with County Road 13 along its short route. County Road 6 terminates at a roundabout with Jamaca Avenue and 34th Street (Washington County 14).

=== County Road 7 ===
County Road 7 is a county route that serves the towns of Hugo, Grant, and Marine on St. Croix. County Road 7's western conterminous is at the county line, where it begins going east as 117th Street North before becoming 122nd St N. County Road 7 has a short concurrency with Manning Avenue (Washington County 15) before turning onto Square Lake Trail. 7 becomes Paul Avenue and then Nason Hill Road before reaching Marine on St. Croix, where it ends at St. Croix Trail (MN 95).

=== County Road 8 ===
County Road 8 is a county route that serves the town of Hugo in northern Washington County. 8 begins at the county line and after a short distance as Frenchman Road, has a concurrency with US Highway 61. County Road 8 then turns on Egg Lake Road and changes street names many times before terminating at County Road 7 .

=== County Road 9 ===
County Road 9 is a county route in Washington County that serves the city of Grant. County Road 9 begins at 75th Street (Washington County 12) in southern Grant. 9 continues north as Jamaca Avenue County Road 9 terminates at County Road 7 in southern Hugo.

=== County Road 10 ===
County Road 10 is known as 10th Street North for all of its route. County Road 10 serves the cities of Oakdale and Lake Elmo. 10 begins at the county line and goes east. County Road 10 has an interchange with Interstate 694 and is Exit 57 from the interstate. 10 continues east and has major intersections at both Inwood Avenue (Washington County 13) and Manning Avenue (Washington County 15). County Road 10 ends at Stagecoach Trail (Washington County 21) in West Lakeland Township.

=== County Road 11 ===
County Road 11 is a county route that serves Stillwater and May Township. County Road 11 begins at Minnesota Highway 96 just west of its terminus at Minnesota 95. County Road 11 is known as Boom Road before it goes around a sharp turn and changes names to Otchipwe Trail. County Road 11 ends at Square Lake Trail (Washington County 7) in May Township.

=== County Road 12 ===
County Road 12 is a county route that serves Mahtomedi, Willernie, Grant, and Stillwater in Washington County. Originally, County Road 12 began as Stillwater Road in Mahtomedi after an intersection with Wildwood Road (MN 244). After Highway 244 was decommissioned, 12 was extended east to begin at State Highway 120 on the county line. 12 then continues through Grant as 75th Street, and has a major intersection with Manning Avenue (Washington County 15) on the border with Stillwater. County Road 12 then changes names again to Myrtle Street before terminating at County Road 5 (Owens Street).

=== County Road 13 ===
County Road 13 is a county route in Washington County that serves Oakdale, Lake Elmo, Woodbury, and Cottage Grove. County Road 13 begins at Highway 36 just west of Interstate 694 in Oakdale as Hadley Avenue North. CSAH 13 soon becomes 50th Street North before turning onto Olson Lake Trail. The segments of County Road 13 that follow Hadley Avenue and 50th Street were, until 2019, signed as CSAH 35. 13 then becomes Ideal Avenue and has a major intersection with 34th Street (County Road 14, Old Highway 5). County Road 13 then has a short concurrency with County Road 6 (Stillwater Boulevard) before turning onto Inwood Avenue It has major intersections at 10th Street (Washington County 10) and Interstate 94 (Exit 250) during this stretch before becoming Radio Drive. 13 continues through Woodbury with a major intersection at Valley Creek Road (Washington County 16) before entering Cottage Grove. In Cottage Grove, County Road 13, now Hinton Avenue, terminates at 70th Street South (Washington County 22).

=== County Road 14 ===
County Road 14 serves the cities of Oakdale, Lake Elmo, and Bayport. 14 begins its route at Century Avenue (MN 120), the western boundary of the county. County Road 14 continues east on the former route of Minnesota Highway 5 as 34th Street, where it has major intersections at Interstate 694 and Ideal Avenue (Washington County 13). County Road 14 then enters a roundabout at Jamaca Avenue and Stillwater Boulevard (Washington County 6). County Road 14 adopts the name Stillwater Boulevard and continues through downtown Lake Elmo, before turning onto Manning Ave, where it has a very brief concurrency with County Road 15. County Road 14 turns onto 40th Street North. 14 becomes Olinda Boulevard at its intersection with Oakgreen Avenue (Washington County 65). County Road 14 becomes Osgood Avenue for a short period before turning onto 47th Street County Road 14 has a concurrency with County Road 21 (Stagecoach Trail) before turning yet again onto 50th Street North. County Road 14 continues into Bayport as 5th Avenue before it ends at 3rd Street (MN 95).

=== County Road 15 ===
County Road 15 is a county route that serves the cities of Lake Elmo, Oak Park Heights, and Scandia as well as May, Baytown, and West Lakeland Townships. County Road 15 begins at an interchange with Interstate 94 and Minnesota Highway 95 South. County Road 15 goes north as Manning Avenue, and has a major intersection at 10th Street North (Washington County 10). 15 has a very short concurrency with County Road 14 before turning onto Stillwater Boulevard. County Road 15 comes to an interchange with Minnesota Highway 36 and Washington County 5, where it turns and has an unsigned concurrency with Highway 36. County Road 15 then turns onto Manning Avenue and has major intersections at 75th Street North (Washington County 12) and Dellwood Road (MN 96). 15 continues onto Manning Trail, has a major intersection with Minnesota 97, and continues out of the county to the north. County Road 15 is the longest county road in Washington County at 26 miles in length.

=== County Road 16 ===
County Road 16 is known as Valley Creek Road and serves Woodbury for its entire route. County Road 16 begins at the western county line at Washington County 25 and Ramsey County 72. 16 continues east and has an interchange with Interstate 494 (Exit 59). County Road 16 has major intersections with Radio Drive (Washington County 13) and Woodbury Drive (Washington County 19), before ending at MN 95 on the Woodbury/Afton border. The County Road 16 designation previously ended at County Road 19, but in 2020 it was extended to MN 95.

=== County Road 17 ===
County Road 17 is a county route that serves the cities of Grant and Lake Elmo. County Road 17 begins at 75th Street (Washington County 12) in Grant and goes south through a major intersection with Minnesota Highway 36. County Road 17 then continues through downtown Lake Elmo, where it has a concurrency with Washington County 14 (Stillwater Boulevard, Old Highway 5). County Road 17 continues south along Lake Elmo Avenue until it ends at 10th Street (Washington County 10).

=== County Road 17B ===
County Road 17B is a short county route in the southern portions of Lake Elmo. 17B runs from the intersection between Lake Elmo Avenue (Washington County 17/17B) and 10th Street (Washington County 10). County Road 17B ends at the border with Woodbury above Interstate 94, where there is no interchange.

=== County Road 18 ===
County Road 18 is a county route that serves the cities of Newport, Woodbury, Afton, St. Mary's Point, Lake St. Croix Beach, Lakeland Shores, and Lakeland. County Road 18 begins at an interchange with Maxwell Avenue (County Road 38) and US Highways 10 and 61 in Newport as Bailey Road. County Road 18 goes east and has a partial interchange with Interstate 494, providing access to US Highways 10 and 61. 18 goes through Woodbury where it has major intersections with Radio Drive (Washington County 13), Woodbury Drive (Washington County 19), and Manning Avenue (MN 95) before becoming 40th Street South. County Road 18 becomes Afton Boulevard and then enters downtown Afton, where it has a short concurrency with Washington County 21 (St. Croix Trail). County Road 18 takes on the name of St. Croix Trail for the rest of its route through St. Mary's Point and Lake St. Croix Beach, goes around three roundabouts while serving the small towns of Lakeland and Lakeland Shores, and ends at the interchange between Interstate 94 and St. Croix Trail (MN 95 North, Washington County 18 South, Exit 258).

=== County Road 19 ===
County Road 19 is a county route in Washington County that serves the cities of Lake Elmo, Woodbury, and Cottage Grove. County Road 19 begins at the entrance to Lake Elmo Park Reserve and is named Keats Avenue. 19 has a major intersection at 10th Street (Washington County 10) and then at Interstate 94 before entering Woodbury and taking on the name Woodbury Drive. In Woodbury, County Road 19 has major intersections at Valley Creek Road (Washington County 16) and Bailey Road (Washington County 18), where there is a roundabout, before entering Cottage Grove and readopting the name Keats Avenue. 19 has a roundabout at 70th Street South (Washington County 22). For the last 0.3 miles of its route, County Road 19 is known as Innovation Road. County 19 ends at US Highways 10 and 61 in southern Cottage Grove.

=== County Road 19A ===
County Road 19A is a short extension of County Road 19 in southern Cottage Grove. It is known as Innovation Road for its entire route from US Highways 10 and 61 to Miller Road.

=== County Road 20 ===
County Road 20 is a county route that serves the cities of Newport, Woodbury, and Cottage Grove. County Road 20 begins at Bailey Road (Washington County 18) in Newport as Military Road. County Road 20 cuts through southwestern Woodbury where it has a major intersection with Radio Drive (Washington County 13). At Jamaica Avenue, on the border between Cottage Grove and Woodbury, 20 enters into Cottage Grove by turning south on Jamaica. It then ends at County Road 22 (70th Street). Previously, it ended at Keats Avenue (Washington County 19) in Cottage Grove, but was demolished in 2018 to make way for Ravine Parkway, a new east–west road in Cottage Grove. Additionally, County Road 20 used to continue east on what is now Washington County 22 to Afton State Park on the eastern edge of the county. This portion of highway is now marked as County Road 22 as well as Old 20.

== CR 21–CR 40 ==
=== County Road 21 ===
County Road 21 is a county route in Washington County that serves the cities of Oak Park Heights, Bayport, and Afton, as well as Baytown, West Lakeland, and Denmark Townships. County Road 21 begins at MN 95 in Bayport as 56th Street North. Part of this section of County Road 21 was formerly County Road 28. Just after this turn, County Road 21 turns again onto Stagecoach Trail at an intersection that ends Washington County 23. County Road 21 has a short concurrency with Washington County 14 in Bayport before continuing towards Afton. At Interstate 94, County Road 21 does not have an interchange. In downtown Afton, County Road 21 turns onto St. Croix Trail (Washington County 18). County Road 21 then adopts the name St. Croix Trail for itself, which it remains until it ends at US Highway 10 in southern Denmark Township, just west of Prescott, Wisconsin.

=== County Road 22 ===
County Road 22 is a county route that serves the cities of St. Paul Park and Cottage Grove, as well as Denmark Township. County Road 22 begins in St. Paul Park at an intersection with Broadway Avenue. The road briefly carries the name Summit Avenue before becoming 70th Street South after passing US Highways 61 and 10. It goes east through Cottage Grove where it has major intersections at Hinton Avenue (Washington County 13), Jamaica Avenue, and Keats Avenue (Washington County 19), where there is a roundabout. East of Keats Avenue, County Road 22 is also signed as Old 20. County Road 22 has a major intersection at Manning Avenue (MN 95) and goes through Denmark Township, crossing St. Croix Trail (Washington County 21) and ending at the entrance to Afton State Park.

=== County Road 23 ===
County Road 23 is a county route that serves the cities of Stillwater and Oak Park Heights. County Road 23 begins as Stagecoach Trail at County Road 21 in Oak Park Heights. 23 turns into 59th Street before turning onto Beach Road at its intersection with 60th Street (Washington County 26). County 23 then continues onto Paris Avenue before turning onto Orleans Street in Stillwater. County Road 23 turns again onto Third Street South and then onto Chestnut Street East as it enters downtown Stillwater, where it ends at Main Street (MN 95).

=== County Road 24 ===
County Road 24 serves the cities of Stillwater and Oak Park Heights, as well as Baytown Township. County Road 24 begins at 47th Street North (Washington County 14) in Baytown Township, near the unincorporated town of Siegel. County Road 24 is known as Osgood Avenue and has a major intersection at Minnesota 36 in Oak Park Heights, before entering Stillwater. County Road 24 turns onto Orleans Street in Stillwater, but after only one block, 24 ends at County Road 23.

=== County Road 25 ===
County Road 25 runs along the western boundary of Washington County as Century Avenue. County Road 25 begins at the interchange between Interstate 94 and Minnesota 120 near the town of Landfall. County Road 25 runs south before ending at an intersection between Century Avenue and Lake Road. County Road 25 is concurrent with Ramsey County 72 for its entire route.

=== County Road 26 ===
County Road 26 is a county route that serves the city of Oak Park Heights. 26 begins at Osgood Avenue (Washington County 24) just south of an intersection with Minnesota 36. County Road 26 goes east for about half a mile before ending at Beach Road (Washington County 23).

=== County Road 27 ===
County Road 27 is a county route that serves Mahtomedi, White Bear Lake, and Birchwood Village in Washington County. County Road 27 forms part of the western border of the county. County Road 27 begins at an intersection between Minnesota 120, Minnesota 244, and Ramsey County 15. County Road 27 goes north until in crosses the border into Ramsey County, just south of White Bear Lake. County Road 27 is named East County Line Road for its entire route. County Road 27 is signed with a white square rather than the standard pentagon shown on the map of Washington County.

=== County Road 28 ===
County Road 28 is a county route that serves Denmark Township. County Road 28 begins at Manning Avenue South (MN 95) and heads east to St. Croix Trail South (Washington County 21). County Road 28 is known as 110th Street South for its entire route. Prior to 2021 County Road 28 was signed as County Road 78.

=== County Road 29 ===
County Road 29 is a county route that was formerly numbered as County Road 36. It was renumbered in 2013 to avoid confusion with Minnesota State Highway 36, which it intersects at its southern end. County Road 29 begins at an interchange with Minnesota 36 in Pine Springs and goes north into Mahtomedi before ending at Stillwater Road (Washington County 12). County Road 29 is known as Hilton Trail for its entire route, and serves the towns of Pine Springs and Mahtomedi.

=== County Road 32 ===
County Road 32 is a county route that serves the city of Forest Lake, Minnesota. County Road 32 was first numbered as County Road 83. County Road 32 begins as 11th Avenue Southwest at Everton Avenue North (Washington County 33). County Road 32 ends at an intersection with US 61 in Forest Lake.

=== County Road 33 ===
County Road 33 is a county route that serves Forest Lake. It begins at an intersection with 11th Avenue Southwest (Washington County 32) and continues north for a short ways to its northern terminus at Broadway Avenue (Washington County 2).

=== County Road 38 ===
County Road 38 is a county route that serves the cities of St. Paul Park and Newport. County Road 38 begins at 70th Street South (Washington County 22) in northern St. Paul Park. County Road 38 goes north as Hastings Avenue as it enters Newport. At Glen Road 38 crosses over US Highways 10 and 61 to 7th Avenue. From here County 38 follows 7th Avenue to 21st Street, and then Maxwell Avenue. County Road 38 has a partial interchange with Interstate 494 before it ends at an interchange with US Highways 10 and 61. From this interchange the roadway continues as Bailey Road (Washington County 18).

=== County Road 39 ===
County Road 39 is a county route that serves the cities of St. Paul Park and Cottage Grove. County Road 39 begins at an intersection with at Summit Avenue (Washington County 22) and Broadway Avenues in St. Paul Park. 39 follows Broadway Avenue going east briefly before turning south onto Hastings Avenue. County Road 39 enters Cottage Grove, following Hadley Avenue to 80th Street South. It then turns east onto 80th Street South to end at an interchange with US Highways 10 and 61.

== CR 50–CR 100 ==
=== County Road 50 ===
County Road 50 is a county route that serves the cities of Forest Lake and Scandia in Washington County, Minnesota. County Road 50 begins at an intersection with US Highway 61 in Forest Lake. 50 continues east as 202nd Street North before making a sharp curve onto Greystone Avenue North, and then another sharp curve onto 200th Street North. County Road 50 continues for less than a mile before making a sharp curve onto Ingersoll Avenue North and then turning right onto 202nd Street North. County Road 50 continues onto Keystone Avenue North and then turns left onto 192nd Street North before ending at Manning Trail North (Washington County 15) in Scandia.

=== County Road 51 ===
County Road 51 is a county route that serves May Township and Stillwater Township. County Road 51 begins at County Road 7 and goes south as Partridge Road to its southern terminus at St. Croix Trail (MN 95).

=== County Road 52 ===
County Road 52 is a short county route that serves the city of Scandia. County Road 52 begins at Scandia Trail (MN 97) in central Scandia. 52 heads east as Oakhill Road North and has an intersection with Olinda Trail North (Washington County 3) shortly after beginning. County Road 52 ends at Highway 95 in southeastern Scandia.

=== County Road 55 ===
County Road 55 is a county route that serves Stillwater Township and May Township. It begins just south of Dellwood Road (Highway 96) at County Road 5. County Road 55 goes north as Norell Avenue North to Square Lake Trail North (County Road 7). Until 2018, County Road 55 continued north through May Township to 170th Street North, but this segment was redesignated as an extension of County State Aid Highway 3.

=== County Road 57 ===
County Road 57 is a county route that serves the city of Hugo. County Road 57 begins at 170th Street North (Washington County 4) in northern Hugo. 57 goes south as Jeffrey Avenue and then turns onto 152nd Street North. County Road 57 continues onto Keystone Avenue and then Keller Avenue before ending at 122nd Street North (Washington County 7) in southern Hugo.

=== County Road 59 ===
County Road 59 is a county route that serves May Township. County Road 59 begins at Paul Avenue (Washington County 7) and goes east as Square Lake Trail to its eastern terminus at St. Croix Trail (MN 95). County Road 59 is signed as a county state aid highway rather than a county road, which it is signed as on the county map.

=== County Road 61 ===
County Road 61 is a county route that serves Grant, May Township, and Stillwater Township. 61 begins at an intersection with Manning Trail North (Washington County 15) as 120th Street. County Road 61 goes east and turns south onto Myeron Road. County Road 61 ends at Norell Avenue (Washington County 55) in Stillwater Township.

=== County Road 62 ===
County Road 62 is a short county route that serves Stillwater and Oak Park Heights. County Road 62 begins at Osgood Avenue North (Washington County 24) just north of Highway 36 in Stillwater. County Road 62 goes east and ends at Panama Avenue in Stillwater. 62 helps provide access to the Washington County Government Center.

=== County Road 63 ===
County Road 63 is a short county route that serves the city of Stillwater. County Road 63 goes south from its northern terminus at 62nd Street (Washington County 62) to 60th Street North. County Road 63 provides access to the Washington County Government Center.

=== County Road 64 ===
County Road 64 is a county route that serves the city of Stillwater. County Road 64 begins at Manning Avenue North (Washington County 15) and heads east as McKusick Road into Stillwater. County road 64 ends at an intersection with Owens Street North (Washington County 5) in northern Stillwater.

=== County Road 65 ===
County Road 65 is a county route that serves Baytown and West Lakeland Townships. County Road 65 begins at 40th Street North (Washington County 14) and heads southward to where it ends at 10th Street North (Washington County 10).

=== County Road 66 ===
County Road 66 is a short county route that serves only the city of Stillwater. County Road 66 begins at Highway 36 and goes north as Greeley Street. 66 has a stoplight at Curve Crest Boulevard just before ending at Orleans Street West.

=== County Road 71 ===
County Road 71 is a county route that serves Afton, Baytown Township, and Denmark Township. County Road 71 begins at 10th Street North (Washington County 10) and heads southward. County Road 71 crosses but has no access to Interstate 94. 71 goes all the way through Afton and ends at 70th Street South (Washington County 22) in northern Denmark Township. County Road 71 is known as Neal Avenue for its whole route.

=== County Road 74 ===
County Road 74 is a county route that serves the cities of Newport and Cottage Grove. County Road 74 begins in Newport at Hastings Avenue South (Washington County 38) and heads east as 65th Street South. County Road 74 enters into Cottage Grove and ends at Hinton Avenue South (Washington County 13).

=== County Road 75 ===
County Road 75 is a county route that serves St. Paul Park and Grey Cloud Island Township. County Road 75 begins at 14th Avenue in St. Paul Park. 75 heads south as Grey Cloud Island Drive into Grey Cloud Island Township, where it ends at 105th Street South.

=== County Road 76 ===
County Road 76 is a county route that serves Denmark Township. It begins at the western edge of the township at Highway 95 and heads across Denmark Township to St. Croix Trail (Washington County 21). County Road 76 is known as 90th Street South for its entire route.

=== County Road 91 ===
County Road 91 is a county route that used to be designated as County Road 1. The route is still co-signed as Old 1. County Road 91 begins at Scandia Trail (MN 97) and heads north to the Chisago County Line as Lofton Avenue North.

=== County Road 96 ===
County Road 96 is a county route that used to be designated as Minnesota State Highway 96. The state highway was turned back Washington County in 2023. County Road 96 starts at the Ramsey/Washington County line in Dellwood where it meets the remainder of MN 96 and MN 244. From here it runs east along the former route of State Highway 96 through Dellwood, Grant, and Stillwater Township, before ending at MN 95 in Stillwater. Along its route it has junctions with County Roads 9, 15, 55, 5, and 11. It is known as Dellwood Road for its entire length.

== Route list ==
Number	Length (mi)	Length (km)	Southern or western terminus	Northern or eastern terminus	Local names	Formed	Removed	Notes
CSAH 1	2.99	4.81	Anoka County line (County 24)	MN 97 in Scandia	Lofton Avenue North	—	c. 2008	Renumbered to CR 91.
CSAH 2	1.88	3.03	Anoka County line (County 18)	US 61 in Forest Lake	Broadway Avenue West	—	—	Exit 131 on I-35.
CSAH 3	11.61	18.68	Square Lake Trail North (CSAH 7) in May Township	Chisago County line (County 25)	Norell Avenue North; Olinda Trail North	—	—	
CSAH 4	11.56	18.60	US 61 in Hugo	MN 95 in Marine on St. Croix	170th Street North; Ostrum Trail North; Broadway Street	—	—	
CR 4A	1.89	3.04	Anoka County line (County 140)	US 61 in Hugo	170th Street North	—	—	
CSAH 5	4.62	7.44	MN 36 in Stillwater	Otchipwe Avenue North (CSAH 11) in May Township	Stillwater Boulevard North; Olive Street West; Owens Street South; Owens Street North; Stonebridge Trail North	—	—	
CSAH 6	3.65	5.87	MN 120 in Oakdale	34th Street North (CSAH 14) in Lake Elmo	Stillwater Boulevard North	—	—	
CSAH 7	14.14	22.76	Ramsey County line (County 2)	MN 95 in Marine on St. Croix	117th Street North; 122nd Street North; Square Lake Trail North; Paul Avenue North; Nason Hill Road North	—	—	
CSAH 8	7.66	12.33	Anoka County line (County 14)	122nd Street North (CSAH 7) in Hugo	Frenchman Road North; Egg Lake Road North; 137th Street North; Homestead Avenue North; 140th Street North; Isleton Avenue North; 130th Street North; Jody Avenue North	—	—	CSAH 8 used to continue east from its current termination at 122nd Street North, which had a short concurrency with CSAH 7 before turning onto Keystone Avenue North; 118th Street North; Kimbro Avenue North; 117th Street North; Lansing Avenue North; 100th Street North, until it ended at Manning Avenue North (CSAH 15), a distance of 3.4 miles (5.5 km). This stretch was renumbered CR 68 after the incorporation of the city of Grant in 1996. Turned over to the city of Grant after 2010.
CR 8A	5.92	9.53	US 61 in Hugo	122nd Street North (CSAH 7) in Hugo	Egg Lake Road North; 137th Street North; Homestead Avenue North; 140th Street North; Isleton Avenue North; 130th Street North; Jody Avenue North	—	c. 2004	Extension of CSAH 8.
CSAH 9	6.03	9.70	75th Street North (CSAH 12) in Grant	122nd Street North (CSAH 7) near Withrow	Jamaca Avenue North; 110th Street North; Julianne Avenue North; 115th Street North; Keats Avenue North; 119th Street North; Keystone Avenue North	—	—	
CSAH 10	4.06	6.53	Ramsey County line (County 2)	Jody Avenue North (CSAH 8/CR 8A) in Hugo	117th Street North; 122nd Street North	—	c. 1980	Extension of CSAH 7.
CSAH 10	9.24	14.87	MN 120 in Oakdale	Stagecoach Trail North (CSAH 21) in West Lakeland Township	10th Street North	—	—	Exit 57 on I-694.
CSAH 11	5.18	8.34	MN 96 in Stillwater	Square Lake Trail North (CSAH 7) in May Township	Boom Road North; Fairy Falls Road North; Otchipwe Avenue North	—	—	
CSAH 12	6.94	11.17	MN 244 in Mahtomedi	Owens Street (CSAH 5) in Stillwater	Stillwater Road; 75th Street North; Myrtle Street West	—	—	
CSAH 13	14.11	22.71	70th Street South (CSAH 22) in Cottage Grove	MN 36 in Oakdale	Hinton Avenue South; Radio Drive; Inwood Avenue North; Ideal Avenue North; Olson Lake Trail North; 50th Street North; Hadley Avenue North	—	—	Exit 250 on I-94.
CR 13A	2.62	4.22	Military Road (CSAH 20) in Woodbury	Tower Drive in Woodbury	Tower Drive	—	c. 2004	Part of CSAH 13.
CR 13B	1.96	3.15	Olson Lake Trail North (CSAH 13) in Lake Elmo	MN 36 in Lake Elmo	50th Street North; DeMontreville Trail North	—	c. 2015	Turned over to the city of Lake Elmo.
CSAH 14	10.89	17.53	MN 120 in Oakdale	MN 95 in Bayport	34th Street North; Stillwater Boulevard North; 40th Street North; Olinda Boulevard North; Osgood Avenue North; 47th Street North; 50th Street North; 5th Avenue North	—	—	Exit 55 on I-694.
CSAH 15	25.90	41.68	I-94 in Lake Elmo	Chisago County line (County 15)	Manning Avenue North; Stillwater Boulevard North; Manning Trail North	—	—	Exit 253 on I-94.
CR 15A	3.02	4.86	MN 97 in Scandia	Chisago County line (County 15)	Manning Trail North	—	c. 2008	Extension of CSAH 15.
CSAH 16	6.09	9.80	Century Avenue (CSAH 25) in Woodbury	Manning Avenue (MN 95) in Woodbury	Valley Creek Road	—	—	Exit 59 on I-494.
CSAH 17	6.82	10.98	10th Street North (CSAH 10) in Lake Elmo	75th Street North (CSAH 12) in Grant	Lake Elmo Avenue North	—	—	
CR 17A	1.51	2.43	MN 36 in Grant	75th Street North (CSAH 12) in Grant	Lake Elmo Avenue North	—	c. 1998	Extension of CSAH 17.
CR 17B	1.04	1.67	I-94 in Lake Elmo	10th Street North (CSAH 10) in Lake Elmo	Lake Elmo Avenue North	—	—	No access between I-94 and CR 17B.
CSAH 18	15.34	24.69	US 10 and US 61 in St. Paul	I-94 in Lakeland	Bailey Road; 40th Street South; Afton Boulevard South; St. Croix Trail South; St. Croix Trail North	—	—	The westernmost 0.10 miles of CSAH 18 are in Ramsey County. Exit 63A on southbound I-494. Exit 258 on I-94.
CSAH 19	11.02	17.73	US 10 and US 61 in Cottage Grove	Lake Elmo Park Reserve entrance in Lake Elmo	Innovation Road South; Keats Avenue South; Woodbury Drive; Keats Avenue North	—	—	Exit 251 on I-94.
CR 19A	0.79	1.27	Miller Road in Cottage Grove	US 10 and US 61 in Cottage Grove	Innovation Road South	—	—	
CSAH 20	4.88	7.85	Bailey Road (CSAH 18) in Newport	70th Street South (CSAH 22) in Cottage Grove	Military Road; Military Road South; Jamaica Avenue South	—	—	
CSAH 21	21.17	34.07	US 10 in Denmark Township	MN 95 in Oak Park Heights	St. Croix Trail South; Stagecoach Trail South; Stagecoach Trail North; 56th Street North	—	—	
CSAH 22	10.10	16.25	Broadway Avenue (CSAH 39) in St. Paul Park	Afton State Park entrance in Denmark Township	Summit Avenue; 70th Street South	—	—	
CSAH 23	2.44	3.93	56th Street North (CSAH 21) in Oak Park Heights	MN 95 in Stillwater	Stagecoach Trail North; 59th Street North; Beach Road North; Paris Avenue North; Orleans Street East; Third Street South; Chestnut Street East	—	—	
CSAH 24	1.92	3.09	47th Street North (CSAH 14) at Siegel	Third Street South (CSAH 23) in Stillwater	Osgood Avenue North; Orleans Street West	—	—	
CSAH 25	1.99	3.20	Lake Road in Woodbury	I-94 in Woodbury	Century Avenue South	—	—	Concurrent with Ramsey CSAH 72. Exit 247 on I-94.
CSAH 26	0.51	0.82	Osgood Avenue North (CSAH 24) in Oak Park Heights	Beach Road North (CSAH 23) in Oak Park Heights	59th Street North	—	—	
CSAH 27	1.04	1.67	MN 244 in White Bear Lake	Ramsey County line (County 94)	East County Line Road	—	—	Concurrent with Ramsey CSAH 72.
CSAH 28	2.75	4.43	MN 95 in Denmark Township	St. Croix Trail South (CSAH 21) in Denmark Township	110th Street South	—	—	Previously CR 78 prior to 2021.
CSAH 28	0.12	0.19	Stagecoach Trail North (CSAH 21) in Bayport	Pickett Avenue North in Bayport	56th Street North	—	c. 2014	Part of CSAH 21.
CSAH 29	1.20	1.93	East County Line Road (CSAH 27) in Birchwood Village	Wildwood Road (MN 244) in Mahtomedi	Cedar Street; Hall Ave; Birchwood Road	—	c. 1980	Turned over to the city of Birchwood Village.
CSAH 29	1.57	2.53	MN 36 in Pine Springs	Stillwater Road (CSAH 12) in Mahtomedi	Hilton Trail North	—	—	
CSAH 32	1.39	2.24	Everton Avenue North (CSAH 33) in Forest Lake	US 61 in Forest Lake	11th Avenue Southwest	—	—	
CSAH 33	0.70	1.13	MN 95 in Scandia	William O'Brien State Park entrance in Scandia	O'Brien Trail North	—	c. 2004	Turned over to the city of Scandia.
CSAH 33	0.81	1.30	11th Avenue Southwest (CSAH 32) in Forest Lake	Broadway Avenue West (CSAH 2) in Forest Lake	Everton Avenue North	—	—	
CSAH 34	1.22	1.96	US 61 in Forest Lake	MN 97 in Forest Lake	11th Avenue Southeast; South Shore Drive; 16th Avenue Southeast; 11th Street Southeast	—	c. 2014	Turned over to the city of Forest Lake.
CSAH 35	1.31	2.11	MN 36 in Oakdale	Olson Lake Trail North (CSAH 13) in Oakdale	Hadley Avenue North; 50th Street North	—	2019	Extension of CSAH 13.
CSAH 36	1.57	2.53	MN 36 in Pine Springs	Stillwater Road (CSAH 12) in Mahtomedi	Hilton Trail North	—	c. 2014	Renumbered to CSAH 29.
CSAH 38	4.24	6.82	70th Street South (CSAH 22) in St. Paul Park	US 10 and US 61 in Newport	Hastings Avenue; Glen Road; 7th Avenue; 21st Street; Maxwell Avenue	—	—	The northernmost 0.10 miles of CSAH 38 are in Ramsey County. Exit 63C on eastbound I-494
CSAH 39	1.78	2.86	US 10 and US 61 in Cottage Grove	Summit Avenue (CSAH 22) in St. Paul Park	80th Street South; Hadley Avenue South; Hastings Avenue; Broadway Avenue	—	—	
CR 50	6.06	9.75	US 61 in Forest Lake	Manning Trail North (CSAH 15) in Scandia	202nd Street North; Greystone Avenue North; 200th Street North; Ingersoll Avenue North; 202nd Street North; Keystone Avenue North; 192nd Street North	—	—	
CR 51	2.98	4.80	MN 95 in Stillwater Township	Square Lake Trail North (CSAH 7) in May Township	Partridge Road North	—	—	
CR 52	2.44	3.93	MN 97 in Scandia	MN 95 in Scandia	Oakhill Road North	—	—	
CR 53	1.35	2.17	MN 95 at Copas	MN 95 in Scandia	Quinnell Avenue North	—	c. 2004	Turned over to the city of Scandia.
CR 54	4.18	6.73	170th Street North (CSAH 4) in Hugo	Keystone Avenue North (CR 50) in Forest Lake	Ingersoll Avenue North; 175th Street North; Inwood Avenue North; 180th Street North; July Avenue North; 190th Street North; Keystone Avenue North	—	c. 2004	Turned over to the cities of Forest Lake and Hugo.
CR 55	4.20	6.76	Stonebridge Trail North (CSAH 5) in Stillwater Township	Square Lake Trail North (CSAH 7) in May Township	Norell Avenue North	—	—	
CR 57	5.83	9.38	122nd Street North (CSAH 7) in Hugo	170th Street North (CSAH 4) in Hugo	Keller Avenue North; Keystone Avenue North; 152nd Street North; Jeffery Avenue North	—	—	
CR 58	2.11	3.40	Manning Trail North (CSAH 15) in May Township	Keystone Avenue North (CR 57) in Hugo	Lynch Road North	—	c. 2004	Turned over to the city of Hugo and to May Township.
CR 59	1.83	2.95	Paul Avenue North (CSAH 7) in May Township	MN 95 in May Township	Square Lake Trail North	—	—	
CR 61	2.84	4.57	Manning Trail North (CSAH 15) in Grant	Norell Avenue North (CR 55) in Stillwater Township	120th Street North; Myeron Road North	—	—	
CR 62	0.25	0.40	Osgood Avenue North (CSAH 24) in Oak Park Heights	Panama Avenue North in Oak Park Heights	62nd Street North	—	—	
CR 63	1.58	2.54	75th Street North (CSAH 12) in Grant	MN 96 in Grant	Kimbro Avenue North	—	c. 2004	Turned over to the city of Grant.
CR 63	0.22	0.35	60th Street North in Oak Park Heights	62nd Street North (CR 62) in Oak Park Heights	Oxboro Avenue North	—	—	
CR 64	2.58	4.15	Manning Avenue North (CSAH 15) in Stillwater Township	Owens Street North (CSAH 5) in Stillwater	McKusick Road North	—	—	
CR 65	3.03	4.88	10th Street North (CSAH 10) in West Lakeland Township	40th Street North (CSAH 14) in Baytown Township	Oakgreen Avenue North	—	—	
CR 66	0.47	0.76	MN 36 in Stillwater	Orleans Street West in Stillwater	Greeley Street South	—	—	
CR 67	1.38	2.22	47th Street North (CSAH 14) at Siegel	MN 36 in Oak Park Heights	Osgood Avenue North	—	c. 2004	Extension of CSAH 24.
CR 68	2.32	3.73	119th Street North (CSAH 9) in Grant	Manning Trail North (CSAH 15) in Grant	Keystone Avenue North; 118th Street N; Kimbro Avenue North; 117th St N; Lansing Avenue North; 110th Street North	—	c. 2011	Turned over to the city of Grant.
CR 69	3.03	4.88	10th Street North (CSAH 10) in West Lakeland Township	40th Street North (CSAH 14) in Baytown Township	Oakgreen Avenue North	—	c. 2004	Renumbered to CR 65.
CR 70	9.24	14.87	MN 120 in Oakdale	Stagecoach Trail North (CSAH 21) in West Lakeland Township	10th Street North	—	c. 1980	
CR 71	8.09	13.02	70th Street South (CSAH 22) in Denmark Township	10th Street North (CSAH 10) in West Lakeland Township	Neal Avenue South; Neal Avenue North	—	—	
CR 74	2.20	3.54	Hastings Avenue (CSAH 38) in Newport	Hinton Avenue South (CSAH 13) in Cottage Grove	65th Street South	—	—	
CR 75	2.63	4.23	105th Street South in Grey Cloud Island Township	14th Avenue in St. Paul Park	Grey Cloud Island Drive South	—	—	
CR 76	3.03	4.88	MN 95 in Denmark Township	St. Croix Trail South (CSAH 21) in Denmark Township	90th Street South	—	—	
CR 82	1.89	3.04	Stonebridge Trail North (CSAH 5) in Stillwater Township	Otchipwe Avenue North (CSAH 11) in Stillwater Township	Stonebridge Trail North	—	c. 1998	Extension of CSAH 5.
CR 83	1.39	2.24	Everton Avenue North in Forest Lake	US 61 in Forest Lake	11th Avenue Southwest	—	c. 2014	Renumbered to CSAH 32.
CR 91	2.99	4.81	MN 97 in Scandia	Chisago County line (County 24)	Lofton Avenue North	—	—	
Former
