= Stillwater Area Public Schools =

School district in Minnesota, United States

Address
- 1875 South Greeley Street Stillwater, Minnesota, 55082; United States

District information
- Grades: PK-12
- Established: 1850
- Superintendent: Dr. Mike Funk

Students and staff
- Enrollment: 8,300 (as of 2018-19)
- Staff: 456 (as of 2011-12)
- Student–teacher ratio: 19.05 (as of 2011-12)

Other information
- Website: http://www.stillwaterschools.org

Stillwater Area Public Schools, also known as Independent School District #834, is a school district serving communities surrounding Stillwater, Minnesota, United States. It currently serves about 8,300 students in 12 schools.

== History ==
Minnesota’s first schoolhouse was built in Stillwater in 1848, a year before Minnesota became a territory. Stillwater became the state’s first school district just two years later.

From the first one-room schoolhouse, Stillwater Area Public Schools has grown to serve more than 8,300 students in 7 elementary schools (PreK-5), two middle schools (grades 6-8), one high school (grades 9-12), and an alternative learning center for secondary students. An early childhood family center serves families with young children, from birth to age 5.

== Area ==
The district stretches 30 miles (48 km) along the St. Croix River from Marine on St. Croix south to Afton, and covers approximately 150 square miles (390 km^{2}).

The district includes all of the following municipalities: Bayport, Lake St. Croix Beach, Lakeland, Lakeland Shores, Marine on St. Croix, Oak Park Heights, St. Mary’s Point, and Stillwater. The district also includes most of the following municipalities: Afton and Lake Elmo, as well as portions of the following municipalities: Grant, Hugo, and Woodbury. The part of Grant in the district includes the Withrow community.

The district includes the following townships: Baytown, West Lakeland Township, and Stillwater. It also includes most of May Township and a part of Denmark Township.

== Achievements ==
- The high school had a 97% graduation rate in 2012-13.
- 87% of graduates went on to 2 or 4 year colleges/universities in 2012-13.
- Approximately 1,000 students earn college credit each year while attending Stillwater Area Public Schools.
- Students (at all grade levels) consistently perform above state and national averages on achievement tests.
- Repeated recognition from the AP College Board in the 2013 school year in which 101 students were named AP Scholars, 73 AP Scholars with Honors, 71 AP Scholars with Distinction and three were named AP National Scholars.
- Since 1913, Stillwater has had nearly 60 Minnesota State High School League State Championships in athletics.
- An outstanding music program (band, orchestra and choir) that is highly regarded across the country: The Concert Wind Symphony has the longest streak of superior ratings in the history of Minnesota.
- Derek Olson, a sixth grade teacher at Afton-Lakeland Elementary School, represented the state of Minnesota as the 2008 Teacher of the Year.
- Stillwater Middle School competed in a Samsung Solve for Tomorrow contest winning over 50,000 dollars for the school.

== Schools ==
=== Elementary schools ===
- Afton-Lakeland Elementary School
- Andersen Elementary School
- Brookview Elementary School
- Lake Elmo Elementary School
- Lily Lake Elementary School
- Rutherford Elementary School
- Stonebridge Elementary School

=== Middle schools ===
- Oak-Land Middle School
- Stillwater Middle School

=== High schools ===
- Stillwater Area High School

=== Other schools ===
- Early Childhood Family Center (ECFC)
- St. Croix Valley Area Learning Center (ALC)
