= Minnesota State Highway 244 =

Highway in Minnesota

Trunk Highway 244
- MN 244 highlighted in red

Route information
- Maintained by MnDOT
- Length: 3.416 mi (5.498 km)
- Existed: July 1, 1949–present

Major junctions
- South end: CSAH 12 at Mahtomedi
- North end: MN 96 at Dellwood

Location
- Country: United States
- State: Minnesota
- Counties: Washington

Highway system
- Minnesota Trunk Highway System; Interstate; US; State; Legislative; Scenic
← MN 243	→ MN 246

Minnesota State Highway 244 (MN 244) is a 3.416-mile-long (5.498 km) highway in Minnesota, which runs from an intersection with CSAH 12 in Mahtomedi and continues to its northern terminus at its intersection with State Highway 96 in Dellwood.

Highway 244 is also known as Wildwood Road, Mahtomedi Avenue, and Dellwood Avenue at various points throughout its route. The route is located in Washington County.

== Route description ==
Highway 244 serves as a north–south route between the communities of Mahtomedi, Willernie, and Dellwood. The route forms an arc around the east side of White Bear Lake.

The road runs primarily through a heavily wooded, residential area. That, combined with hilly terrain and numerous curves, results in a 30–35 mph (50–55 km/h) speed limit for most of its length. It becomes 45 mph (70 km/h) after the junction with County Road 12, and lowers to 40 mph (65 km/h) when it reaches the commercial area at its southern terminus with Highway 120 and County Road 15.

The route was legally defined as Route 244 in the Minnesota Statutes.

== History ==
Highway 244 was authorized on July 1, 1949. The route had been paved prior to it becoming a state highway.

At one time, Highway 244 had continued farther west from its junction with Highway 120 at the White Bear Lake / Mahtomedi boundary line. Before 2002, the route had continued west of Highway 120 on present day Ramsey County Road 15 (the south edge of the city of White Bear Lake) until reaching Highway 61 at the Vadnais Heights / Gem Lake boundary line. Highway 244 had previously formed an arc around both the south and east sides of White Bear Lake.

The 2001 Minnesota Legislature approved removal of Route 244 from the state trunk highway system. The portion within Ramsey County was, and still is, also known as County Road E. In 2002, the Ramsey County portion was officially transferred to the county and the State Highway 244 signs were removed and it was re-signed as Ramsey County Road 15 (County E).

Most of Highway 244 within Washington County remains part of the state trunk highway system. The Washington County draft 2040 Comprehensive Plan indicates that the segment of Highway 244 between Century Avenue and Washington County Road 12 is a candidate for jurisdictional transfer from the Minnesota Department of Transportation to Washington County. A transfer agreement for this segment was discussed by the Washington County Board of Commissioners in an informational workshop on April 23, 2019, but no vote was taken. In 2021, the section west of County Road 12 was turned back, and improvements were subsequently made to the roadway.

== Major intersections ==
The entire route is in Washington County.

Location	mi	km	Destinations	Notes
White Bear Lake–Mahtomedi city line	0.000	0.000	MN 120 south (Century Avenue) / CSAH 15 west (County E) / CR 27 north	Former southern terminus; current western terminus of CSAH 12
Mahtomedi	1.326	2.134	CSAH 12 (Stillwater Road)	Current southern terminus; roadway continues as an extension of CSAH 12
Dellwood	4.742	7.632	MN 96 (Dellwood Road)	
1.000 mi = 1.609 km; 1.000 km = 0.621 mi: Closed/former
