= LSCB =

LSCB may refer to:

- Lake St. Croix Beach, Minnesota, United States
- Local Safeguarding Children Board, a public policy board
- LSCB (language), the language of the deaf communities of urban Brazil
