= List of county roads in Ramsey County, Minnesota =

- Standard county road marker

Highway names
- Interstates: Interstate X (I-X)
- US Highways: U.S. Highway X (US X)
- County State-Aid Highways: County State-Aid Highway X (CSAH X)
- County Roads: County Road X (CR X)

System links
- County roads of Minnesota; Ramsey County

Ramsey County, a county that has a population of 526,714 (2013 estimate), has many county roads. The following is an incomplete list of county-maintained roads in Ramsey County, Minnesota, United States.

== Lettered county roads ==
Map of Signed Routes in Ramsey County

There are several county routes that follow roads marked with letters, such as "County B" or "County H2."

- County Road B (County 25)
- County Road B2 (County 24, County 78, County 111)
- County Road C (County 23)
- County Road C2
- County Road D (County 19)
- County Road E (County 15, County 99)
- County Road E2 (County 73)
- County Road F (County 12, County 95)
- County Road H (County 9)
- County Road H2 (County 5)
- County Road I (County 3)
- County Road J (County 1, County 81)

== Numbered Route list ==
Number	Length (mi)	Length (km)	Southern or western terminus	Northern or eastern terminus	Local names	Formed	Removed	Notes
CSAH 1	9.11	14.66	Anoka County line (County 32)	Anoka County line (County 32)	County Road J	—	—	
CSAH 2	0.06	0.097	Portland Avenue (County 71/County 161) in White Bear Township	Washington County Line (County 7)	Short Street	—	—	
CSAH 3	3.43	5.52	County Road 10 in Mounds View	Hamline Avenue (County 50) in Shoreview	County Road I	—	—	Western Segment
CSAH 3	1.54	2.48	Hamline Avenue (County 50) in Shoreview	Hodgson Road (County 49) in Shoreview	County Road I	—	—	Eastern Segment
CSAH 4	1.57	2.53	Turtle Lake Road in Shoreview	County Road J (County 1) in Shoreview	Sherwood Road	—	—	
CSAH 5	1.52	2.45	Centerville Road (County 59) in White Bear Township	Bald Eagle Boulevard (County 6/County 249) in White Bear Township	County Road H2	—	—	
CSAH 6	0.71	1.14	County Road H2 (County 5/County 249) in White Bear Township	Bald Eagle Avenue (County 7/County 67) in White Bear Township	Bald Eagle Boulevard	—	—	
CSAH 7	0.56	0.90	Bald Eagle Avenue (County 6/County 67) in White Bear Township	Buffalo Street (County 8/County 84) in White Bear Township	Bald Eagle Boulevard	—	—	
CSAH 8	0.88	1.42	Bald Eagle Boulevard (County 7/County 84) in White Bear Township	Portland Avenue (County 71) in White Bear Township	Buffalo Street	—	—	
CSAH 9	1.3	2.1	Silver Lake Road (County 44) in New Brighton	County Road 10 in Mounds View	County Road H	—	—	
CSAH 10	3.0	4.8	Anoka County Line (County 10)	I-35W, US 10 in Mounds View	Mounds View Boulevard	—	—	Old US 10
CSAH 11	—	—	Anoka County Line (County 6)	Long Lake Road (County 45) in New Brighton	Rice Creek Road	—	—	
CSAH 12	—	—	8th Avenue in New Brighton	Old Highway 8 (County 77) in New Brighton	10th Street	—	—	Western Segment
CSAH 12	—	—	Hamline Avenue (County 50) in Arden Hills	Victoria Street (County 52) in Shoreview	County Road F	—	—	Central Segment
CSAH 12	—	—	Hodgson Road (County 49) in Shoreview	Centerville Road (County 59) in Vadnais Heights	County Road F	—	—	Central Segment
CSAH 12	—	—	US 61 in White Bear Lake	East County Line Road (County 72/County 94) in White Bear Township	County Road F	—	—	Eastern Segment
CSAH 14	—	—	McMenemy Street (County 57) in Vadnais Heights	Centerville Road (County 15/County 59) in Vadnais Heights	Koehler Road; Edgerton Street	—	—	Western Segment
CSAH 14	—	—	Centerville Road (County 59) in Vadnais Heights	Otter Lake Road (County 60/County 148) in Gem Lake	Goose Lake Road; Labore Road	—	—	Eastern Segment
CSAH 15	—	—	Stinson Boulevard (County 63) in New Brighton	Old Highway 8 (County 77) in New Brighton	County Road E	—	—	Western Segment
CSAH 15	—	—	Snelling Avenue (County 76/County 149) in Arden Hills	Victoria Street (County 52) in Shoreview	County Road E	—	—	Central Segment
CSAH 15	—	—	Centerville Road (County 14/County 59) in Vadnais Heights	Minnesota 120, Minnesota 244 in White Bear Lake	County Road E	—	—	Eastern Segment
CSAH 16	—	—	Rice Street (County 49) in Vadnais Heights	Edgerton Street (County 58/County 59) in Vadnais Heights	Vadnais Boulevard	—	—	
CSAH 18	—	—	Soo Street (County 136) in Shoreview	Rice Street (County 49) in Shoreview	Owasso Boulevard	—	—	
CSAH 19	—	—	Highcrest Road in New Brighton	Fairview Avenue (County 47/County 48/County 149) in Roseville	County Road D	—	—	Western Segment
CSAH 19	—	—	Little Canada Road (County 21) in Little Canada	White Bear Avenue (County 65) in Maplewood	Centerville Road; County Road D	—	—	Central Segment
CSAH 19	—	—	White Bear Avenue (County 65) in Maplewood	Bellaire Avenue (County 107) in Maplewood	Lydia Avenue	—	—	Eastern Segment
CSAH 20	—	—	US 61 in Maplewood	White Bear Avenue (County 65) in Maplewood	Beam Avenue	—	—	
CSAH 21	—	—	Lakeshore Avenue (County 23) in Little Canada	Edgerton Street (County 22/County 58) in Little Canada	Little Canada Road	—	—	
CSAH 22	—	—	Edgerton Street (County 21/County 58) in Little Canada	County Road C (County 23) in Maplewood	Keller Parkway	—	—	
CSAH 23	—	—	Hennepin County Line (County 94)	Little Canada Road (County 21) in Little Canada	County Road C	—	—	Western Segment
CSAH 23	—	—	Keller Parkway (County 22) in Maplewood	Minnesota 120 in North St. Paul	County Road C	—	—	Eastern Segment
CSAH 24	—	—	Minnesota 280, Highway 36 Service Road in Roseville	Cleveland Avenue (County 46/County 78) in Roseville	St. Croix Street; Terminal Road; County Road B2	—	—	
CSAH 25	—	—	Dead end near Eustis Street in Roseville	Edgerton Street (County 58) in Maplewood	County Road B	—	—	Western Segment
CSAH 25	—	—	61 in Maplewood	Minnesota 120 in North St. Paul	County Road B; South Avenue	—	—	Eastern Segment
CSAH 26	—	—	Dead end near Walnut Street in Lauderdale	Fulham Street (County 128) in Roseville	Roselawn Avenue	—	—	
CSAH 27	—	—	Larpenteur Avenue (County 30) in Maplewood	61 in Maplewood	Parkway Drive; Arcade Street	—	—	
CSAH 29	—	—	White Bear Avenue (County 65) in Maplewood	McKnight Road (County 68) in North St. Paul	North St. Paul Road; 7th Avenue	—	—	
CSAH 30	—	—	Hennepin County Line (County 52)	Parkway Drive (County 27) in St. Paul	Larpenteur Avenue	—	—	Western Segment
CSAH 30	—	—	East Shore Drive in St. Paul	Minnesota 120 in Maplewood	Larpenteur Avenue	—	—	Eastern Segment
CSAH 31	—	—	Minnesota 51 in St. Paul	Lexington Parkway (County 51) in St. Paul	Como Avenue	—	—	Western Segment
CSAH 31	—	—	Dale Street (County 53) in St. Paul	White Bear Avenue (County 65) in St. Paul	Maryland Avenue	—	—	Central Segment
CSAH 31	—	—	Lakewood Drive (County 68) in Maplewood	Minnesota 120 in Maplewood	Maryland Avenue	—	—	Eastern Segment
CSAH 32	—	—	Minnesota 280 in St. Paul	Rice Street (County 49) in St. Paul	Energy Park Drive; Como Avenue	—	—	
CSAH 33	—	—	University Avenue (County 34) in St. Paul	Rice Street (County 49) in St. Paul	Transfer Road; Pierce Butler Route; Minnehaha Avenue; Como Avenue	—	—	Western Segment
CSAH 33	—	—	Como Avenue (County 33/County 56) in St. Paul	Phalen Boulevard in St. Paul	Pennsylvania Avenue	—	—	Eastern Segment
CSAH 34	—	—	Hennepin County Line (County 36)	12th Street in St. Paul	University Avenue; Robert Street	—	—	Western Segment
CSAH 34	—	—	Minnesota 5 in Maplewood	Minnesota 120 in Maplewood	Minnehaha Avenue	—	—	Eastern Segment
CSAH 35	—	—	Hennepin County Line (County 3)	Lexington Parkway (County 51) in St. Paul	Marshall Avenue	—	—	Western Segment
CSAH 35	—	—	Lexington Parkway (County 51) in St. Paul	Dale Street (County 53) in St. Paul	Selby Avenue	—	—	Central Segment
CSAH 35	—	—	US 10 and US 61 in St. Paul	McKnight Road (County 68) in St. Paul	Burns Avenue; Upper Afton Road	—	—	Eastern Segment
CSAH 36	—	—	Sibley Street (County 37) in St. Paul	US 10 and US 61 in St. Paul	Warner Road	—	—	
CSAH 37	—	—	Randolph Avenue (County 38) in St. Paul	US 10 and US 61 in St. Paul	Shepard Road	—	—	
CSAH 38	—	—	Cleveland Avenue (County 46) in St. Paul	Shepard Road (County 37) in St. Paul	Randolph Avenue	—	—	
CSAH 39	—	—	US 10 and US 61 in St. Paul	Century Avenue (Ramsey County 72/Washington County 25) in Maplewood	Lower Afton Road	—	—	
CSAH 40	—	—	Water Street in St. Paul	Bayfield Street in St. Paul	Plato Boulevard	—	—	
CSAH 42	—	—	Hennepin County Line (County 46)	Minnesota 51 in St. Paul	Ford Parkway	—	—	
CSAH 43	—	—	Point Douglas Road (To US 10 and US 61) in St. Paul	Century Avenue (County 72) in Maplewood	Carver Avenue	—	—	
CSAH 44	—	—	37th Avenue in St. Anthony	County Road 10 in Mounds View	Silver Lake Road	—	—	
CSAH 45	—	—	8th Avenue (County 12) in New Brighton	Long Lake Road (To County Road J) in Mounds View	Long Lake Road	—	—	
CSAH 46	—	—	Munster Avenue (To Minnesota 5) in St. Paul	St. Anthony Avenue in St. Paul	Edgcumbe Road; St. Paul Avenue; Cleveland Avenue	—	—	Southern Segment
CSAH 46	—	—	University Avenue (County 34) in St. Paul	County Road B (County 25/To I-35W/To Minnesota 36) in Roseville	Raymond Avenue; Cleveland Avenue	—	—	Central Segment
CSAH 46	—	—	County Road B2 (County 24/County 78) in Roseville	County Road E2 (County 73) in Arden Hills	Cleveland Avenue	—	—	Central Segment
CSAH 46	—	—	County Road E2 (County 73) in New Brighton	Old Highway 8 (County 77) in New Brighton	5th Avenue	—	—	Northern Segment
CSAH 47	—	—	County Road D/Fairview Avenue (County 19/County 48/County 149) in Arden Hills	County Road E2 (County 73) in Arden Hills	New Brighton Road	—	—	
CSAH 48	—	—	Larpenteur Avenue (County 30) in Falcon Heights	County Road D (County 19/County 47/County 149) in Roseville	Fairview Avenue	—	—	
CSAH 49	—	—	University Avenue (County 34) in St. Paul	County Road J (County 1) in Shoreview	Rice Street; Hodgson Road	—	—	
CSAH 50	—	—	Larpenteur Avenue (County 30) in Falcon Heights	Minnesota 51 in Arden Hills	Hamline Avenue	—	—	Southern Segment
CSAH 50	—	—	County Road F (County 12/To I-694/To US 10) in Arden Hills	Highway 96 (County 96) in Arden Hills	Hamline Avenue	—	—	Central Segment
CSAH 50	—	—	County Road I (County 3) in Shoreview	County Road I (County 3) in Shoreview	Hamline Avenue	—	—	Northern Segment
CSAH 51	—	—	Minnesota 5, Minnesota 51 in St. Paul	County Road J (County 1), Anoka County Road 17, and Anoka County Road 32 in Shoreview	Lexington Parkway; Lexington Avenue	—	—	
CSAH 52	—	—	County Road B (County 25) in Roseville	County Road F (County 12) in Shoreview	Victoria Street	—	—	
CSAH 53	—	—	Grand Avenue in St. Paul	County Road C (County 23) in Roseville	Dale Street	—	—	
CSAH 54	—	—	Hodgson Road (County 49) in Shoreview	Highway 96 (County 96) in Shoreview	Rice Street	—	—	
CSAH 55	—	—	Pennsylvania Avenue (County 33) in St. Paul	Larpenteur Avenue (County 30) in St. Paul	Jackson Street; Acker Street; Cortland Place	—	—	
CSAH 56	—	—	Concordia Avenue (To I-94) in St. Paul	Como Avenue (County 33) in St. Paul	Marion Street	—	—	
CSAH 57	—	—	Koehler Road (County 14) in Vadnais Heights	Highway 96 (County 96) in Vadnais Heights	McMenemy Street	—	—	
CSAH 58	—	—	Minnesota 5 in St. Paul	Centerville Road (County 16/County 59) in Vadnais Heights	Payne Avenue; Edgerton Street	—	—	
CSAH 59	—	—	Edgerton Street (County 16/County 58) in Vadnais Heights	Anoka County Line (County 21)	Centerville Road	—	—	
CSAH 60	—	—	Goose Lake Road (County 14/County 148) in Gem Lake	County Road J (County 81/To I-35E) and Anoka County Road 84 in White Bear Township	Otter Lake Road	—	—	
CSAH 63	—	—	County Road E (County 15) in New Brighton	Fairway Drive (Anoka County 4) in New Brighton	Stinson Boulevard	—	—	
CSAH 64	—	—	Minnesota 5 in St. Paul	Larpenteur Avenue (County 30) in St. Paul	Johnson Parkway; Phalen Boulevard; Prosperity Avenue; Hazelwood Street; Prosperity Road	—	—	
CSAH 65	—	—	Upper Afton Road (County 35) in St. Paul	US 61 in White Bear Lake	White Bear Avenue	—	—	
CSAH 67	—	—	9th Street (County 93) in White Bear Lake	Bald Eagle Boulevard (County 6/County 7) in White Bear Township	Bald Eagle Avenue	—	—	
CSAH 68	—	—	Carver Avenue (County 43) in St. Paul	Minnesota 5 in Maplewood	McKnight Road	—	—	Southern Segment
CSAH 68	—	—	Minnesota 5 in Maplewood	County Road F (County 12) in White Bear Lake	Lakewood Drive; McKnight Road	—	—	Northern Segment
CSAH 70	—	—	County Road E (County 15) in White Bear Lake	County Road F (County 12) in White Bear Lake	Bellaire Avenue	—	—	
CSAH 71	—	—	Minnesota 96 in White Bear Township	Short Street (County 2/County 161) in White Bear Township	Portland Avenue	—	—	
CSAH 72	—	—	Carver Avenue (County 43) in Maplewood	Century Avenue in Woodbury	Century Avenue	—	—	Southern Segment
CSAH 72	—	—	Lake Road in Woodbury	I-94 in Maplewood	Century Avenue	—	—	Central Segment
CSAH 72	—	—	Minnesota 120, Minnesota 244 in White Bear Lake	County Road F (County 12/County 94) in White Bear Township	East County Line Road	—	—	Northern Segment
CSAH 73	—	—	5th Avenue (County 46) in New Brighton	Snelling Avenue (County 76) in Arden Hills	County Road E2	—	—	
CSAH 75	—	—	Raymond Avenue (County 46) in St. Paul	Minnesota 51 in St. Paul	Como Avenue	—	—	
CSAH 76	—	—	Highway 96 (County 96/To US 10) in Arden Hills	County Road E (County 15/County 149) in Arden Hills	Snelling Avenue; Old Highway 10	—	—	
CSAH 77	—	—	County Road D (County 19) in New Brighton	County Road H (County 9) in Mounds View	Old Highway 8	—	—	
CSAH 78	—	—	Cleveland Avenue (County 24/County 46) in Roseville	Dale Street (County 53) in Roseville	County Road B2	—	—	
CR 81	—	—	Centerville Road (County 59) in White Bear Township	Otter Lake Road (County 60) in White Bear Township	County Road J	—	—	Western Segment
CR 81	—	—	County 59 in North Oaks	Bald Eagle Boulevard (County 249) in White Bear Township	County Road J	—	—	Central Segment
CR 81	—	—	Washington County Line (County 7)	Portland Avenue (County 161) in White Bear Township	County Road J	—	—	Eastern Segment
CR 83	—	—	Bald Eagle Boulevard (County 84) in White Bear Township	Hugo Road (County 154) in White Bear Township	Taylor Avenue	—	—	
CR 84	—	—	Buffalo Street (County 7/County 8) in White Bear Township	Taylor Avenue (County 83) in White Bear Township	Bald Eagle Boulevard	—	—	
CR 85	—	—	Bald Eagle Boulevard (County 7) in White Bear Township	Hugo Road (County 154) in White Bear Township	Park Avenue	—	—	
CR 86	—	—	Otter Lake Road (County 60) in White Bear Township	Division Street (County 151) in White Bear Township	Stillwater Street	—	—	
CSAH 88	—	—	Hennepin County Line (County 88)	I-35W in New Brighton	Highway 88	—	—	Old US 8 / MN 88
CR 89	—	—	Minnesota 96 in White Bear Lake	Buffalo Street (County 8) in White Bear Township	Northwest Avenue	—	—	
CR 93	—	—	Otter Lake Road (County 60) in White Bear Lake	Bale Eagle Avenue (County 67) in White Bear Lake	9th Street	—	—	Replaced by local streets.
CR 94	—	—	White Bear Avenue (County 65) in White Bear Lake	County Road F (County 12) in White Bear Township	Southshore Boulevard; East County Line Road	—	—	
CR 95	—	—	Hoffman Road (County 146) in Gem Lake	US 61 in Gem Lake	County Road F	—	—	
CSAH 96	—	—	Old Highway 8 (County 77) in New Brighton	US 61 in White Bear Lake	Highway 96	—	—	Old MN 96
CR 99	—	—	New Brighton Road (County 47) in Arden Hills	Lake Johanna Boulevard (County 149) in Arden Hills	County Road E	—	—	Western Segment
CR 99	—	—	Victoria Street (County 52) in Shoreview	Soo Street (County 136) in Shoreview	County Road E	—	—	Eastern Segment
CR 107	—	—	Bellaire Avenue (County 19) in Maplewood	Lake Boulevard (County 109) in Maplewood	Lydia Avenue	—	—	
CR 108	—	—	County Road E (County 15) in Vadnais Heights	Goose Lake Road (County 14) in Vadnais Heights	Labore Road	—	—	
CR 109	—	—	Lake Boulevard (County 107) in Maplewood	Minnesota 120 in Maplewood	Joy Road	—	—	
CR 111	—	—	Dale Street (County 53) in Roseville	Rice Street (County 49) in Roseville	County Road B2	—	—	Replaced by County 78 and local streets
CR 127	—	—	Eustis Street in Lauderdale	Roselawn Avenue (County 26) in Lauderdale	Eustis Street	—	—	
CR 128	—	—	Larpenteur Avenue (County 30) in Falcon Heights	Roselawn Avenue (County 26) in Falcon Heights	Fulham Street	—	—	
CR 136	—	—	Owasso Boulevard (County 18) in Shoreview	County Road E (County 99) in Shoreview	Soo Street	—	—	
CR 146	—	—	County Road E (County 15) in White Bear Lake	Cedar Avenue in White Bear Lake	Hoffman Road	—	—	Southern Segment
CR 146	—	—	Cedar Avenue in Gem Lake	US 61 in White Bear Lake	Hoffman Road	—	—	Northern Segment
CR 147	—	—	Schenneman Road (County 148) in Gem Lake	Hoffman Road (County 146) in Gem Lake	Otter Lake Road	—	—	
CR 148	—	—	Otter Lake Road (County 147) in Gem Lake	Goose Lake Road (County 14/County 60) in Gem Lake	Otter Lake Road	—	—	
CSAH 149	—	—	County Road D (County 19/County 47/County 48) in Arden Hills	Snelling Avenue (County 15/County 76) in Arden Hills	Lake Johanna Boulevard	—	—	
CR 151	—	—	Stillwater Street (County 86) in White Bear Township	Park Avenue (County 85) in White Bear Township	Division Street	—	—	
CR 152	—	—	8th Street in White Bear Lake	Bald Eagle Boulevard (County 84) in White Bear Township	Long Avenue; Eagle Street	—	—	
CR 154	—	—	Park Avenue (County 85) in White Bear Township	County Road J (County 81) in White Bear Township	Hugo Road	—	—	
CR 160	—	—	County Road F (County 12/County 70) in White Bear Township	Southshore Boulevard (County 94) in White Bear Township	Bellaire Avenue	—	—	
CR 161	—	—	Short Street (County 2/County 71) in White Bear Township	County Road J (County 81) in White Bear Township	Portland Avenue	—	—	
CR 249	—	—	County Road H2 (County 5/County 6) in White Bear Township	County Road J (County 81) in White Bear Township	Bald Eagle Boulevard	—	—	
Former

== See also ==
- County roads in Minnesota
