= Siegel, Minnesota =

Siegel
- Unincorporated community
- Location within Minnesota Location within the United States
- Coordinates: 45°00′56″N 92°48′25″W
- Country: United States
- State: Minnesota
- County: Washington County
- Township: Baytown Township
- Elevation: 886 ft (270 m)
- Time zone: UTC-6 (Central (CST))
  - Summer (DST): UTC-5 (CDT)
- ZIP code: 55082
- Area code: 651
- GNIS feature ID: 654941

Siegel is an unincorporated community in Baytown Township, Washington County, Minnesota, United States. The community is located south of Oak Park Heights near the junction of Washington County Roads 14 and 24.

Nearby places include Oak Park Heights, Bayport, and Stillwater.

Siegel is located within section 9 of Baytown Township.
