= Minnesota State Highway 120 =

Highway in Minnesota

Trunk Highway 120
- MN 120 highlighted in red

Route information
- Maintained by MnDOT
- Length: 7.233 mi (11.640 km)
- Existed: 1965–present

Major junctions
- South end: I-94 / US 12 / CSAH 25 / CSAH 72 at Maplewood, Woodbury, Oakdale
- MN 5 at Maplewood, Oakdale; MN 36 at North St. Paul, Oakdale; I-694 at Mahtomedi
- North end: CSAH 12 / CSAH 15 / CR 27 at White Bear Lake, Mahtomedi

Location
- Country: United States
- State: Minnesota
- Counties: Ramsey, Washington

Highway system
- Minnesota Trunk Highway System; Interstate; US; State; Legislative; Scenic
← MN 119	→ MN 121

Minnesota State Highway 120 (MN 120) is a 7.2-mile-long (11.6 km) state highway in Minnesota, which runs from a point south of its interchange with Interstate 94 (I-94) in Maplewood (near Landfall) and continues north to its northern terminus at its intersection with MN 244 and County Road 15 (CR 15) at the White Bear Lake–Mahtomedi boundary line.

MN 120 is also known as Century Avenue, Geneva Avenue, and Division Street at various points throughout its route.

The highway runs along the Washington–Ramsey county line for most of its length.

== Route description ==
MN 120 serves as a north–south route between the communities of Maplewood, Oakdale, North St. Paul, White Bear Lake, and Mahtomedi.

The Gateway Bicycle Trail crosses MN 120 near MN 36 at the North St. Paul–Oakdale boundary line.

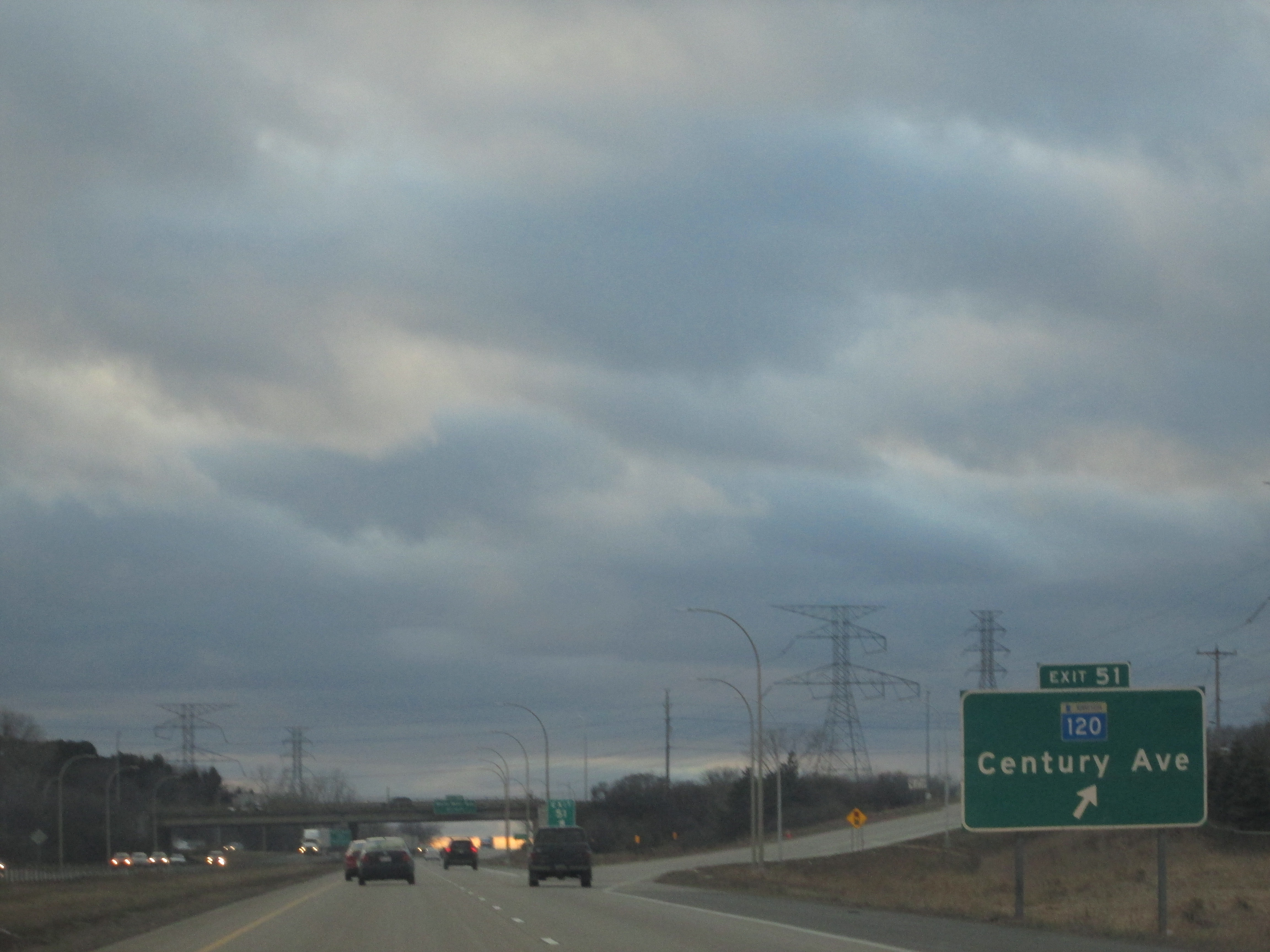
Exit off I-694 for MN 120

MN 120 mostly parallels I-694 throughout its route. MN 120 also has an interchange with I-694 at the White Bear Lake–Mahtomedi line.

The route is legally defined as Route 117 in the Minnesota Statutes. It is not marked with this number.

== History ==
The present day MN 120 was established in 1965. Previously, this route was part of MN 100 (hence the name Century Avenue) from 1934 to 1965.

This route was originally part of the MN 100 beltway circling the entire Twin Cities during the 1940s and 1950s.

MN 120 was numbered as a derivative of MN 100.

The Minnesota Legislature approved the removal of MN 120 from the state trunk highway system in Washington and Ramsey counties in 2001. The portion of the route in Washington County (from I-94 to I-494) has been removed, however the part of the highway in Ramsey County is still marked and the legal definition of its legislative route has not been changed.

At one time, MN 120 had continued farther south. Before 2002, the route had continued south of I-94 on present day CSAH 72/CSAH 25 (the Maplewood–Woodbury boundary line) until reaching Valley Creek Road in Woodbury. MN 120 then briefly followed Valley Creek Road (present day CR 16) eastbound until its interchange with I-494.

MN 120 previously had a brief concurrency with MN 5. In 2015, the state turned back the portions of MN 5 along and east of Century Avenue over to Washington County.

== Major intersections ==
County	Location	mi	km	Destinations	Notes
Washington	Woodbury	0.000	0.000	I-494 / CSAH 16 (Valley Creek Road)	Programmed mile 0; former southern terminus
Ramsey–Washington county line	Maplewood–Woodbury line	1.990	3.203	CSAH 25 / CSAH 72 south (Century Avenue south) / Brookview Drive	Southern terminus; road continues as CSAH 25/CSAH 72 (Century Avenue)
Ramsey–Washington county line	Maplewood–Oakdale– Woodbury tripoint	2.114– 2.279	3.402– 3.668	I-94 (US 12)	I-94 exit 247
Ramsey–Washington county line	Maplewood–Oakdale line	4.178	6.724	MN 5 west (Stillwater Road) / CSAH 6	
Ramsey–Washington county line	Maplewood–Oakdale line	5.552	8.935	CSAH 14	Former MN 5 east
Ramsey–Washington county line	North St. Paul–Oakdale line	7.239	11.650	MN 36	
Ramsey–Washington county line	Mahtomedi	8.228	13.242	I-694	I-694 exit 51
Ramsey–Washington county line	Mahtomedi–White Bear Lake line	9.347	15.043	CSAH 12 east (Wildwood Road) / CSAH 15 west (County Road E) / CR 27 north (East County Line Road)	Northern terminus; CSAH 12 is former MN 244; road continues as CR 27 (East County Line Road)
1.000 mi = 1.609 km; 1.000 km = 0.621 mi: Closed/former
