= Minnesota State Highway 97 =

State highway in Minnesota, United States

Trunk Highway 97
- MN 97 highlighted in red

Route information
- Maintained by MnDOT
- Length: 13.173 mi (21.200 km)
- Existed: 1933–present

Major junctions
- West end: I-35 / CSAH 23 at Columbus
- US 61 at Forest Lake
- East end: MN 95 at Scandia

Location
- Country: United States
- State: Minnesota
- Counties: Anoka, Washington

Highway system
- Minnesota Trunk Highway System; Interstate; US; State; Legislative; Scenic
← MN 96	→ MN 99

Minnesota State Highway 97 (MN 97) is a 13.173-mile-long (21.200 km) highway in Minnesota, which runs from its junction with Interstate 35 and Anoka County Road 23 in Columbus, near Forest Lake, and continues east to its eastern terminus at its intersection with State Highway 95 in Scandia, near Marine on St. Croix. MN 97 is also known as Scandia Trail.

== Route description ==
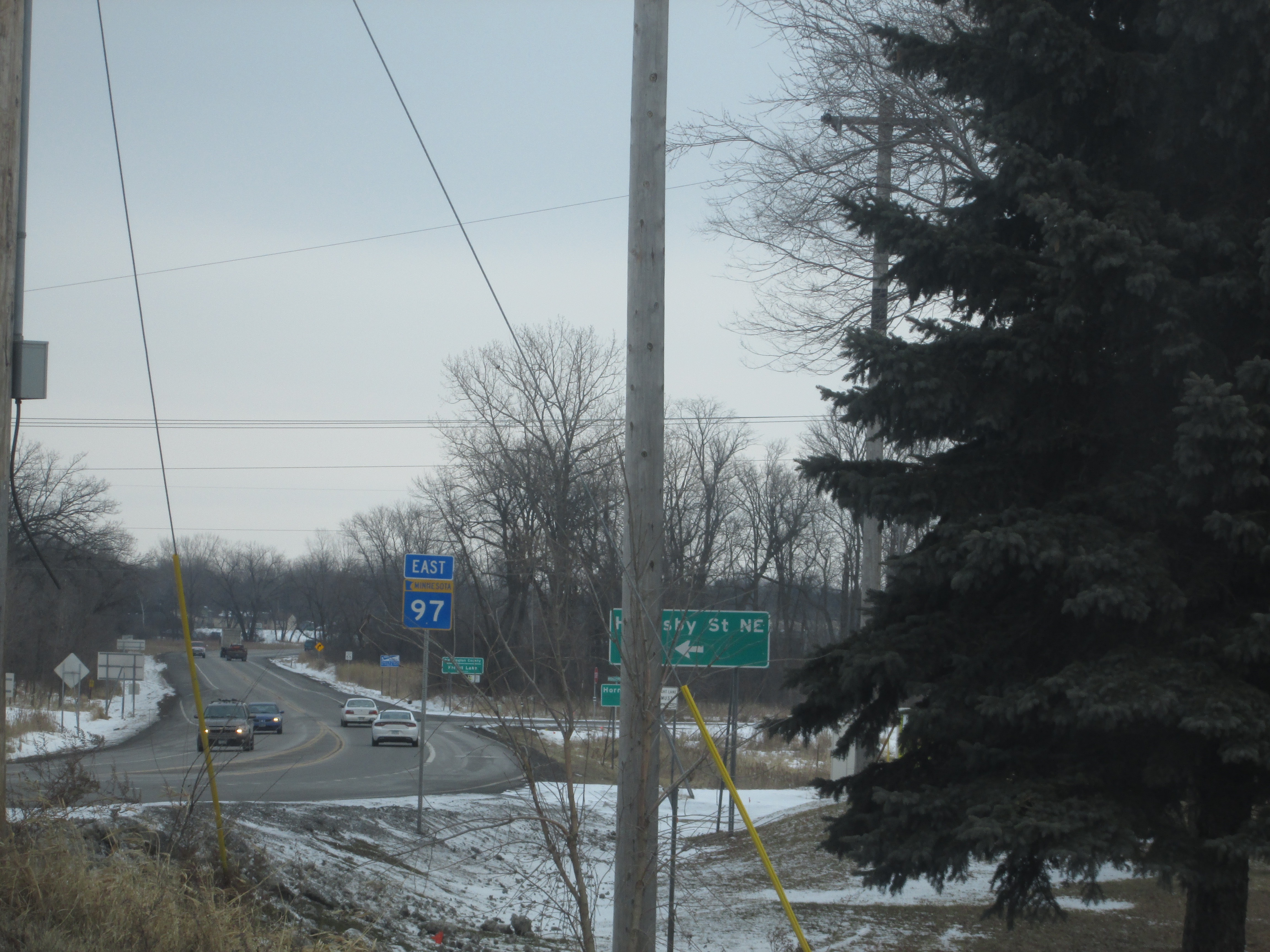
Western end of MN-97, looking east

State Highway 97 serves as an east–west arterial route between the communities of Columbus, Forest Lake, and Scandia.

Highway 97 intersects U.S. Highway 61 in Forest Lake.

The route is legally defined as Legislative Route 97 in the Minnesota Statutes, except for the short portion between I-35 and U.S. 61, which is part of unmarked Minnesota Constitutional Route 62.

== History ==
State Highway 97 was authorized in 1933 between State Highway 95 in Scandia and U.S. Highway 61 in Forest Lake.

The route was completely paved by 1941.

Highway 97 was extended west of U.S. 61 in the mid 1960s to connect with Interstate 35. This expanded section was originally part of U.S. Highway 8.

== Major intersections ==
County	Location	mi	km	Destinations	Notes
Anoka	Columbus	0.000	0.000	CSAH 23 west	Formerly U.S. 8
Anoka	Columbus	0.000– 0.138	0.000– 0.222	I-35 – St. Paul, Minneapolis, Duluth	Interchange
Washington	Forest Lake	2.108	3.392	US 61 south – Hugo	South end of US 61 overlap
Washington	Forest Lake	2.435	3.919	US 61 north	North end of US 61 overlap
Washington	Scandia	13.247	21.319	MN 95 (St. Croix Trail) – Marine on St. Croix, Stillwater, Taylors Falls	
1.000 mi = 1.609 km; 1.000 km = 0.621 mi: Concurrency terminus
