= Urban township (Minnesota) =

An urban township or urban town is a designation of a unit of local government in Minnesota as prescribed by Minnesota Statues 2004, 368.01. A town (township) within 20 miles of the city hall of a city of over 200,000 (i.e., within 20 miles of downtown Minneapolis or St. Paul), or a town with a population of 1,200 or more, is automatically an urban township. In addition, a town with a population of 1,000 or more may vote at its annual town meeting to become an urban township.

An urban township is freed from needing elector approval of certain town actions, and is given additional powers given otherwise only to cities. The greatest addition to powers of an urban township is that of economic development and public works.
