= Grant, Minnesota =

City in Minnesota, United States

Grant
- City
- Location of the city of Grant within Washington County, Minnesota
- Coordinates: 45°04′54″N 92°54′16″W
- Country: United States
- State: Minnesota
- County: Washington

Area
  - Total: 26.50 sq mi (68.64 km^{2})
  - Land: 25.08 sq mi (64.96 km^{2})
  - Water: 1.42 sq mi (3.68 km^{2})
- Elevation: 1,011 ft (308 m)

Population (2020)
  - Total: 3,966
  - Density: 158.1/sq mi (61.05/km^{2})
- Time zone: UTC-6 (Central (CST))
  - Summer (DST): UTC-5 (CDT)
- ZIP code: 55082, 55115
- Area code: 651
- FIPS code: 27-25334
- GNIS feature ID: 2394963
- Website: www.cityofgrant.us

Grant is a city in Washington County, Minnesota. The population was 3,966 at the 2020 census.

== History ==
The city was named for President Ulysses S. Grant. From time to time, western villages in Grant Township separated as incorporated cities. Grant Township incorporated itself as the City of Grant in November 1996.

== Geography ==
According to the United States Census Bureau, the city has an area of 26.52 square miles (68.69 km^{2}); 25.10 square miles (65.01 km^{2}) is land and 1.42 square miles (3.68 km^{2}) is water. Minnesota State Highways 36 and 96 are two of the main routes in the community. The area is home to several bike paths, including the Gateway state trail.

== Demographics ==
Historical population
Census	Pop.	Note	%±
2000	4,026		—
2010	4,096		1.7%
2020	3,966		−3.2%
U.S. Decennial Census

=== 2020 census ===
As of the 2020 census, Grant had a population of 3,966. The median age was 50.9 years. 20.1% of residents were under the age of 18 and 23.3% of residents were 65 years of age or older. For every 100 females there were 103.4 males, and for every 100 females age 18 and over there were 103.1 males age 18 and over.

0.0% of residents lived in urban areas, while 100.0% lived in rural areas.

There were 1,453 households in Grant, of which 28.0% had children under the age of 18 living in them. Of all households, 76.7% were married-couple households, 10.0% were households with a male householder and no spouse or partner present, and 10.3% were households with a female householder and no spouse or partner present. About 13.3% of all households were made up of individuals and 6.8% had someone living alone who was 65 years of age or older.

There were 1,522 housing units, of which 4.5% were vacant. The homeowner vacancy rate was 0.4% and the rental vacancy rate was 0.0%.

Racial composition as of the 2020 census
Race	Number	Percent
White	3,659	92.3%
Black or African American	10	0.3%
American Indian and Alaska Native	4	0.1%
Asian	65	1.6%
Native Hawaiian and Other Pacific Islander	0	0.0%
Some other race	44	1.1%
Two or more races	184	4.6%
Hispanic or Latino (of any race)	99	2.5%

=== 2010 census ===
As of the census of 2010, there were 4,096 people, 1,464 households, and 1,235 families residing in the city. The population density was 163.2 inhabitants per square mile (63.0/km^{2}). There were 1,509 housing units at an average density of 60.1 per square mile (23.2/km^{2}). The racial makeup of the city was 96.7% White, 0.2% African American, 0.3% Native American, 1.8% Asian, 0.3% from other races, and 0.6% from two or more races. Hispanic or Latino of any race were 1.8% of the population.

There were 1,464 households, of which 33.3% had children under the age of 18 living with them, 76.8% were married couples living together, 4.8% had a female householder with no husband present, 2.7% had a male householder with no wife present, and 15.6% were non-families. 12.8% of all households were made up of individuals, and 5.1% had someone living alone who was 65 years of age or older. The average household size was 2.79 and the average family size was 3.05.

The median age in the city was 47.7 years. 23.7% of residents were under the age of 18; 6.5% were between the ages of 18 and 24; 14.4% were from 25 to 44; 40.6% were from 45 to 64; and 14.8% were 65 years of age or older. The gender makeup of the city was 50.8% male and 49.2% female.

=== 2000 census ===
As of the census of 2000, there were 4,026 people, 1,374 households, and 1,215 families residing there. The population density was 156.8 inhabitants per square mile (60.5/km^{2}). There were 1,399 housing units at an average density of 54.5 per square mile (21.0/km^{2}). The racial makeup of the city was 98.14% White, 0.15% African American, 0.07% Native American, 0.89% Asian, 0.45% from other races, and 0.30% from two or more races. Hispanic or Latino of any race were 1.19% of the population.

There were 1,374 households, out of which 39.9% had children under the age of 18 living with them, 82.6% were married couples living together, 3.6% had a female householder with no husband present, and 11.5% were non-families. 9.1% of all households were made up of individuals, and 3.0% had someone living alone who was 65 years of age or older. The average household size was 2.93 and the average family size was 3.11.

In the city, the population was spread out, with 28.1% under the age of 18, 5.3% from 18 to 24, 24.3% from 25 to 44, 34.2% from 45 to 64, and 8.1% who were 65 years of age or older. The median age was 42 years. For every 100 females, there were 104.9 males. For every 100 females age 18 and over, there were 100.6 males.

The median income for a household in the city was $98,228, and the median income for a family was $104,601. Males had a median income of $65,441 versus $38,895 for females. The per capita income for the city was $44,486. About 1.7% of families and 1.8% of the population were below the poverty line, including 1.3% of those under age 18 and 9.5% of those age 65 or over.

== See also ==
- Withrow, Minnesota
