= Dellwood, Minnesota =

City in Minnesota, United States

Dellwood
- City
- Location of the city of Dellwood within Washington County, Minnesota
- Coordinates: 45°05′55″N 92°58′02″W
- Country: United States
- State: Minnesota
- County: Washington

Area
  - Total: 2.81 sq mi (7.28 km^{2})
  - Land: 2.66 sq mi (6.90 km^{2})
  - Water: 0.15 sq mi (0.38 km^{2})
- Elevation: 981 ft (299 m)

Population (2020)
  - Total: 1,171
  - Density: 439.7/sq mi (169.77/km^{2})
- Time zone: UTC-6 (Central (CST))
  - Summer (DST): UTC-5 (CDT)
- ZIP code: 55110
- Area code: 651
- FIPS code: 27-15616
- GNIS feature ID: 2394503
- Website: dellwood.us

Dellwood is a city in Washington County, Minnesota, United States and a suburb of St. Paul. As of the 2020 census, Dellwood had a population of 1,171.

== History ==
Dellwood was platted in 1882. Population began to increase with the completion of the Stillwater & St. Paul Railroad with the development of summer homes along the train route for wealthy people from St. Paul. During this era, F. Scott Fitzgerald lived in a Dellwood cottage while writing The Great Gatsby.

Dellwood continued to grow and received status as a village in 1917. It became a city in the 1970s. The city is platted to include several commercial farm businesses that became its economic engine, of which The Pine Tree Apple Orchard and 7 Vines Winery are the best-known.

== Geography ==
According to the United States Census Bureau, the city has an area of 2.81 square miles (7.28 km^{2}); 2.66 square miles (6.89 km^{2}) is land and 0.15 square miles (0.39 km^{2}) is water. Minnesota State Highway 96 serves as a main route in the community.

== Demographics ==
Historical population
Census	Pop.	Note	%±
1920	87		—
1930	90		3.4%
1940	152		68.9%
1950	245		61.2%
1960	310		26.5%
1970	524		69.0%
1980	751		43.3%
1990	887		18.1%
2000	1,033		16.5%
2010	1,063		2.9%
2020	1,171		10.2%
U.S. Decennial Census

Dellwood consistently ranks as the wealthiest town in Minnesota and among the 25 wealthiest towns in the country.

=== 2010 census ===
As of the census of 2010, there were 1,063 people, 372 households, and 319 families living in the city. The population density was 399.6 inhabitants per square mile (154.3/km^{2}). There were 409 housing units at an average density of 153.8 per square mile (59.4/km^{2}). The racial makeup of the city was 96.7% White, 0.4% African American, 0.1% Native American, 1.7% Asian, 0.1% Pacific Islander, 0.1% from other races, and 0.9% from two or more races. Hispanic or Latino of any race were 2.0% of the population.

There were 372 households, of which 40.3% had children under the age of 18 living with them, 79.0% were married couples living together, 3.5% had a female householder with no husband present, 3.2% had a male householder with no wife present, and 14.2% were non-families. 12.4% of all households were made up of individuals, and 6.8% had someone living alone who was 65 years of age or older. The average household size was 2.85 and the average family size was 3.13.

The median age in the city was 46.1 years. 28.9% of residents were under the age of 18; 4.9% were between the ages of 18 and 24; 14.5% were from 25 to 44; 38.2% were from 45 to 64; and 13.5% were 65 years of age or older. The gender makeup of the city was 51.3% male and 48.7% female.

=== 2000 census ===
As of the census of 2000, there were 1,033 people, 353 households, and 304 families living in the city. The population density was 374.5 inhabitants per square mile (144.6/km^{2}). There were 374 housing units at an average density of 135.6 per square mile (52.4/km^{2}). The racial makeup of the city was 98.26% White, 0.48% African American, 0.10% Native American, 0.77% Asian, 0.29% from other races, and 0.10% from two or more races. Hispanic or Latino of any race were 0.87% of the population.

There were 353 households, out of which 42.8% had children under the age of 18 living with them, 80.7% were married couples living together, 3.4% had a female householder with no husband present, and 13.6% were non-families. 10.8% of all households were made up of individuals, and 3.7% had someone living alone who was 65 years of age or older. The average household size was 2.93 and the average family size was 3.16.

In the city, the population was spread out, with 29.7% under the age of 18, 5.3% from 18 to 24, 18.6% from 25 to 44, 37.0% from 45 to 64, and 9.4% who were 65 years of age or older. The median age was 44 years. For every 100 females, there were 99.0 males. For every 100 females age 18 and over, there were 96.2 males.

The median income for a household in the city was $129,136, and the median income for a family was $133,717. Males had a median income of $84,792 versus $50,625 for females. The per capita income for the city was $61,592. About 1.6% of families and 1.9% of the population were below the poverty line, including 3.3% of those under age 18 and 1.4% of those age 65 or over.

== Notable people ==
Notable Dellwood residents include Herb Brooks, coach of the Miracle on Ice hockey team; F. Scott Fitzgerald; and Jesse Ventura, former governor of Minnesota and pro wrestler.
