= Minnesota State Highway 96 =

State highway in Minnesota, United States

Trunk Highway 96
- MN 96 highlighted in red

Route information
- Maintained by MnDOT
- Length: 1.225 mi (1.971 km)
- Existed: 1933–present

Major junctions
- West end: US 61 at White Bear Lake
- East end: MN 244 at Dellwood

Location
- Country: United States
- State: Minnesota
- Counties: Ramsey, Washington

Highway system
- Minnesota Trunk Highway System; Interstate; US; State; Legislative; Scenic
← MN 95	→ MN 97

Minnesota State Highway 96 (MN 96) is a 1.225-mile-long (1.971 km) state highway in Minnesota that runs from its intersection with U.S. Highway 61 (US 61) in White Bear Lake and continues east to its eastern terminus at its intersection with MN 244 in Dellwood.

The route is known as Lake Avenue North within the city of White Bear Lake, and briefly as Dellwood Road in Dellwood. The route is mostly in Ramsey County and enters Washington County for a brief 300 feet.

Many people in the area still think of Highway 96 in two sections: 1) this eastern portion that remains a State Highway and 2) the western portion that is now known as County Road 96 (CR 96) in Ramsey County. The two portions were never aligned, but were always about a mile apart, with the western portion about a mile south of the eastern portion.

== Route description ==
MN 96 serves as a minor east–west arterial route between White Bear Lake and Dellwood.

The route is legally defined as Legislative Route 96 in the Minnesota Statutes.

== History ==
MN 96 was authorized in 1933. It was paved east of US 61 at the time the highway was marked. The part of the highway between US 8 and US 61 was completely paved by 1935.

From 1934 to 1994, MN 96 included the western portion that is now known as CR 96, which extended farther west several miles through the communities of Vadnais Heights, Shoreview, and Arden Hills. The former western terminus for MN 96 during this time period was at its intersection with old US 8 (near I-35W) on the Arden Hills–New Brighton border. This section of MN 96 was once part of the MN 100 Beltway circling the entire Twin Cities during the 1940s and 1950s.

The western portion of MN 96 between US 61 at White Bear Lake and Old Highway 8 at Arden Hills is now known as CR 96.

A few people in the area still remember stories of how the western portion of MN 96 was first built across the south arm of Birch Lake the 1930s in White Bear Township. Most now only see that part of the lake as a pond to the south and a marshland to the north, but that's the result of major landfill projects that began in the 1930s and continued in road-widening projects through the 1990s. Local farmer and machinist Con Heckel told of more than one 1930s construction company that went out of business in the process. The old roads had gone around the lakes, but the new ones like MN 96 were built straight over them.

The 2021 Minnesota Legislature authorized removal of the section east of MN 244, to become effective when a turnback agreement is reached with Washington County. MN 96 is a turnback candidate because it is a minor arterial, which functions more as a county state-aid highway or county road.

== Major intersections ==
County	Location	mi	km	Destinations	Notes
Ramsey	New Brighton	0.000	0.000	Old US 8	Programmed mile 0; former western terminus
Ramsey	New Brighton–Arden Hills line	0.075– 0.134	0.121– 0.216	I-35W	
Ramsey	Arden Hills	0.528– 0.539	0.850– 0.867	US 10 west	
Ramsey	Shoreview	3.478– 3.493	5.597– 5.621	MN 49	Now CSAH 49
Ramsey	White Bear Lake	6.559– 6.695	10.556– 10.775	I-35E	
Ramsey	White Bear Lake	8.447	13.594	US 61 south	Former western end of US 61 concurrency
Ramsey	White Bear Lake	9.357	15.059	US 61	Current western terminus
Washington	Dellwood	10.582	17.030	MN 244	Current eastern terminus
Washington	Stillwater	19.561	31.480	MN 95 (Main Street)	
1.000 mi = 1.609 km; 1.000 km = 0.621 mi: Closed/former
