= Newport, Minnesota =

City in Minnesota, United States

- City
- Location of the city of Newport within Washington County, Minnesota
- Coordinates: 44°52′16″N 93°00′07″W
- Country: United States
- State: Minnesota
- County: Washington
- Settled: 1857
- Incorporated: 1889

Government
  - Mayor: Laurie Elliott
  - City Council: Josh Schmidt; Tom Ingemann; Bill Sumner; Marvin Taylor

Area
  - Total: 3.860 sq mi (9.997 km^{2})
  - Land: 3.618 sq mi (9.370 km^{2})
  - Water: 0.242 sq mi (0.626 km^{2})
- Elevation: 741 ft (226 m)

Population (2020)
  - Total: 3,797
  - Estimate (2023): 5,321
  - Density: 1,471/sq mi (567.9/km^{2})
- Time zone: UTC−6 (Central)
  - Summer (DST): UTC−5 (CDT)
- ZIP Code: 55055
- Area code: 651
- FIPS code: 27-45790
- GNIS feature ID: 2395227
- Sales tax: 8.375%
- Website: newportmn.gov

Newport is a city in Washington County, Minnesota, United States. The population was 3,797 at the 2020 census. According to 2023 census estimates, its population is 5,321.

== History ==
Newport was platted in 1857. A post office has been in operation at Newport since 1857.

== Geography ==
According to the United States Census Bureau, the city has an area of 3.860 square miles (10.00 km^{2}), of which 3.618 square miles (9.37 km^{2}) is land and 0.242 square miles (0.63 km^{2}) is water.

Interstate 494 and U.S. Routes 10 and 61 serve as the main routes in the community.

Newport is along the Mississippi River, southeast of Saint Paul.

== Demographics ==
Historical population
Census	Pop.	Note	%±
1900	307		—
1910	370		20.5%
1920	453		22.4%
1930	541		19.4%
1940	872		61.2%
1950	1,672		91.7%
1960	2,349		40.5%
1970	2,922		24.4%
1980	3,323		13.7%
1990	3,720		11.9%
2000	3,715		−0.1%
2010	3,435		−7.5%
2020	3,797		10.5%
2023 (est.)	5,321		40.1%
U.S. Decennial Census; 2020 Census

=== 2020 census ===
As of the 2020 census, there were 3,797 people, 1,473 households, and 945 families residing in the city. The population density was 1,049.5 inhabitants per square mile (405.2/km^{2}), and there were 1,546 housing units. The median age was 37.1 years. 24.7% of residents were under the age of 18 and 13.7% were 65 years of age or older. For every 100 females, there were 104.4 males, and for every 100 females age 18 and over, there were 102.5 males.

100.0% of residents lived in urban areas, while 0.0% lived in rural areas.

Among households, 32.6% had children under the age of 18 living in them. Of all households, 42.2% were married-couple households, 21.7% were households with a male householder and no spouse or partner present, and 26.0% were households with a female householder and no spouse or partner present. 28.2% of all households were made up of individuals, and 9.5% had someone living alone who was 65 years of age or older.

Of housing units, 4.7% were vacant. The homeowner vacancy rate was 1.4%, and the rental vacancy rate was 6.5%.

Newport, Minnesota – Racial Composition (NH= Non-Hispanic) Note: the US Census treats Hispanic/Latino as an ethnic category. This table excludes Latinos from the racial categories and assigns them to a separate category. Hispanics/Latinos can be of any race.
Race	Number	Percentage
White (NH)	2,557	67.3%
Black or African American (NH)	370	9.7%
Native American or Alaska Native (NH)	44	1.2%
Asian (NH)	284	7.5%
Pacific Islander (NH)	0	0.0%
Some Other Race (NH)	12	0.3%
Mixed/Multi-Racial (NH)	230	6.1%
Hispanic or Latino	300	7.9%
Total	3,797	100.0%

=== 2010 census ===
As of the 2010 census, there were 3,435 people, 1,354 households, and 875 families living in the city. The population density was 946.3 inhabitants per square mile (365.4/km^{2}). There were 1,466 housing units at an average density of 403.9 per square mile (155.9/km^{2}). The racial makeup of the city was 85.0% White, 5.0% African American, 0.7% Native American, 3.8% Asian, 0.1% Pacific Islander, 2.6% from other races, and 2.6% from two or more races. Hispanic or Latino of any race were 6.4% of the population.

There were 1,354 households, of which 31.4% had children under the age of 18 living with them, 46.8% were married couples living together, 10.9% had a female householder with no husband present, 7.0% had a male householder with no wife present, and 35.4% were non-families. 28.2% of all households were made up of individuals, and 8.6% had someone living alone who was 65 years of age or older. The average household size was 2.53 and the average family size was 3.09.

The median age in the city was 37.3 years. 24.4% of residents were under the age of 18; 8.4% were between the ages of 18 and 24; 27.5% were from 25 to 44; 28.7% were from 45 to 64; and 11.1% were 65 years of age or older. The gender makeup of the city was 51.4% male and 48.6% female.

=== 2000 census ===
As of the 2000 census, there were 3,715 people, 1,418 households, and 968 families living in the city. The population density was 1,014.4 inhabitants per square mile (391.7/km^{2}). There were 1,442 housing units at an average density of 393.8 inhabitants per square mile (152.0/km^{2}). The racial makeup of the city was 91.76% White, 1.70% African American, 0.92% Native American, 1.48% Asian, 0.11% Pacific Islander, 1.94% from other races, and 2.10% from two or more races. Hispanic or Latino of any race were 4.25% of the population.

There were 1,418 households, out of which 36.1% had children under the age of 18 living with them, 49.7% were married couples living together, 13.1% had a female householder with no husband present, and 31.7% were non-families. 24.9% of all households were made up of individuals, and 8.9% had someone living alone who was 65 years of age or older. The average household size was 2.61 and the average family size was 3.11.

In the city, the population was spread out, with 27.4% under the age of 18, 9.5% from 18 to 24, 31.3% from 25 to 44, 22.0% from 45 to 64, and 9.9% who were 65 years of age or older. The median age was 34 years. For every 100 females, there were 93.3 males. For every 100 females age 18 and over, there were 94.4 males.

The median income for a household in the city was $45,373, and the median income for a family was $51,223. Males had a median income of $38,140 versus $28,527 for females. The per capita income for the city was $22,310. About 2.4% of families and 3.7% of the population were below the poverty line, including 4.2% of those under age 18 and 8.2% of those age 65 or over.

== Politics ==
Presidential election results

Precinct General Election Results
Year	Republican	Democratic	Third parties
2020	46.0% 961	50.8% 1,062	3.2% 66
2016	45.5% 800	43.1% 757	11.4% 201
2012	40.0% 739	56.6% 1,046	3.4% 63
2008	40.5% 726	56.3% 1,008	3.2% 57
2004	41.6% 755	56.3% 1,021	2.1% 38
2000	37.8% 638	53.4% 902	8.8% 148
1996	25.7% 400	56.1 875	18.2% 284
1992	22.4% 404	47.2% 850	30.3% 546
1988	33.4% 538	61.9% 998	4.7% 75
1984	37.7% 625	59.0% 978	3.3% 55
1980	34.2% 530	54.0% 837	11.8% 184
1976	29.7% 432	67.1% 976	3.2% 46
1968	28.7% 273	64.1% 610	7.2% 69
1964	26.1% 258	71.9% 712	2.0% 20
1960	39.2% 399	59.4% 604	1.4% 14

== Notable people ==
- Karla Bigham, Minnesota state Senator, former Washington County Commissioner
- Franklin Clarence Mars, founder of candy manufacturer Mars, Incorporated
