= West Lakeland Township, Washington County, Minnesota =

West Lakeland Township, Minnesota
- Township
- Location within the state of Minnesota West Lakeland Township, Minnesota (the United States)
- Coordinates: 44°58′23″N 92°48′48″W
- Country: United States
- State: Minnesota
- County: Washington

Area
  - Total: 12.6 sq mi (32.7 km^{2})
  - Land: 12.4 sq mi (32.0 km^{2})
  - Water: 0.27 sq mi (0.7 km^{2})
- Elevation: 820 ft (250 m)

Population (2020)
  - Total: 3,976
- Time zone: UTC-6 (Central (CST))
  - Summer (DST): UTC-5 (CDT)
- ZIP code: 55082
- Area code: 651
- FIPS code: 27-69520
- GNIS feature ID: 0665966
- Website: www.westlakeland.govoffice2.com

West Lakeland Township is a township in Washington County, Minnesota, United States. The population was 3,976 at the 2020 census. It is just north of Interstate 94 and touches the west bank of the St. Croix River.

== Geography ==
According to the United States Census Bureau, the township has a total area of 12.6 square miles (32.7 km^{2}), of which 12.4 square miles (32.0 km^{2}) is land and 0.3 square mile (0.7 km^{2}) (2.06%) is water.

Interstate 94 runs along the far south side of the township, just to the north of its border with Afton. The St. Croix River and Wisconsin are to the east. Baytown Township is to the north. Lake Elmo is to the west of the township.

== Demographics ==
As of the census of 2000, there were 3,547 people, 1,101 households, and 996 families residing in the township. The population density was 286.8 inhabitants per square mile (110.7/km^{2}). There were 1,118 housing units at an average density of 90.4 per square mile (34.9/km^{2}). The racial makeup of the township was 97.01% White, 0.34% African American, 0.20% Native American, 1.21% Asian, 0.39% from other races, and 0.85% from two or more races. Hispanic or Latino of any race were 1.49% of the population.

There were 1,101 households, out of which 52.4% had children under the age of 18 living with them, 85.8% were married couples living together, 2.5% had a female householder with no husband present, and 9.5% were non-families. 7.2% of all households were made up of individuals, and 1.2% had someone living alone who was 65 years of age or older. The average household size was 3.22 and the average family size was 3.40.

In the township the population was spread out, with 34.2% under the age of 18, 4.4% from 18 to 24, 31.2% from 25 to 44, 26.6% from 45 to 64, and 3.6% who were 65 years of age or older. The median age was 36 years. For every 100 females, there were 102.5 males. For every 100 females age 18 and over, there were 100.3 males.

The median income for a household in the township was $96,256, and the median income for a family was $98,783. Males had a median income of $62,031 versus $42,226 for females. The per capita income for the township was $35,764. About 0.3% of families and 1.0% of the population were below the poverty line, including 0.5% of those under age 18 and none of those age 65 or over.

== Government ==
West Lakeland Township is governed by a board composed of three members elected to staggered three-year terms. Members include Dave Schultz, chairman; John Buelow and Phil Moosbrugger, supervisors. Township staff consists of Carrie Seifert, clerk; Jennifer Samec, deputy clerk; and Marsha Olson, treasurer.

== Notable people ==
- Michele Bachmann, former U.S. representative, lived in West Lakeland Township
