= Baytown Township, Washington County, Minnesota =

Baytown Township, Minnesota
- Township
- Location within the state of Minnesota Baytown Township, Minnesota (the United States)
- Coordinates: 45°0′43″N 92°48′51″W
- Country: United States
- State: Minnesota
- County: Washington

Area
  - Total: 9.6 sq mi (24.8 km^{2})
  - Land: 8.2 sq mi (21.2 km^{2})
  - Water: 1.4 sq mi (3.6 km^{2})
- Elevation: 906 ft (276 m)

Population (2020)
  - Total: 2,088
- Time zone: UTC-6 (Central (CST))
  - Summer (DST): UTC-5 (CDT)
- ZIP code: 55082
- Area code: 651
- FIPS code: 27-04132
- GNIS feature ID: 0663529

Baytown Township is an urban township in Washington County, Minnesota, United States. The population was 2,088 at the 2020 census. The unincorporated community of Siegel is located within Baytown Township.

== History ==
Baytown Township was organized in 1858, and named for a harbor on the St. Croix River.

== Geography ==
According to the United States Census Bureau, the township has a total area of 9.6 square miles (25 km^{2}), of which 8.2 square miles (21 km^{2}) is land and 1.4 square miles (3.6 km^{2}) (14.42%) is water. 40th Street North / Olinda Boulevard, Oakgreen Avenue, and Stagecoach Trail are three of the main routes in the township.

== Demographics ==
As of the census of 2000, there were 1,533 people, 492 households, and 435 families residing in the township. The population density was 187.2 inhabitants per square mile (72.3/km^{2}). There were 499 housing units at an average density of 60.9 per square mile (23.5/km^{2}). The racial makeup of the township was 95.56% White, 0.46% African American, 0.39% Native American, 1.96% Asian, 0.13% from other races, and 1.50% from two or more races. Hispanic or Latino of any race were 1.11% of the population.

There were 492 households, out of which 47.0% had children under the age of 18 living with them, 81.9% were married couples living together, 4.1% had a female householder with no husband present, and 11.4% were non-families. 8.9% of all households were made up of individuals, and 2.4% had someone living alone who was 65 years of age or older. The average household size was 3.12 and the average family size was 3.34.

In the township the population was spread out, with 31.4% under the age of 18, 5.9% from 18 to 24, 26.9% from 25 to 44, 29.9% from 45 to 64, and 5.9% who were 65 years of age or older. The median age was 39 years. For every 100 females, there were 107.2 males. For every 100 females age 18 and over, there were 102.1 males.

The median income for a household in the township was $99,362, and the median income for a family was $102,231. Males had a median income of $69,375 versus $38,750 for females. The per capita income for the township was $38,260. About 1.7% of families and 1.3% of the population were below the poverty line, including none of those under age 18 and 14.6% of those age 65 or over.
