= Area code 651 =

Area code for Saint Paul, Minnesota, and suburbs

Coordinates: 44°57′N 93°0′W

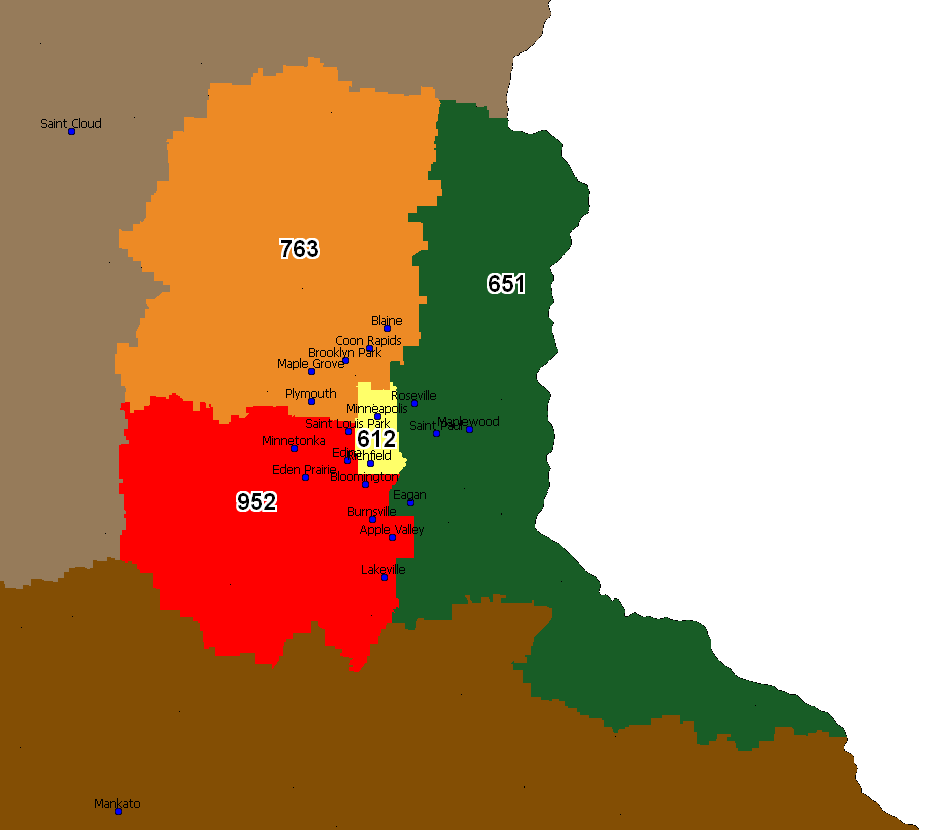
Metropolitan area codes with 651 in dark green.

A map of Minnesota area codes.

Area code 651 is a telephone area code in the North American Numbering Plan (NANP) for Saint Paul, Minnesota, and the eastern suburbs of the Twin Cities. The numbering plan area (NPA) also extends to the southeast along the Mississippi River to include Hastings. It was the fifth area code created in the state in 1998, when it was created in a split of area code 612.

== History ==
From 1954 to 1996, the 612 numbering plan area comprised all of central Minnesota, stretching from border-to-border from Wisconsin to South Dakota. In 1996, nearly all of the area outside the Twin Cities received area code 320. This was intended as a long-term solution, but within a year, the proliferation of cell phones and pagers continued a shortage of telephone numbers in 612, causing further relief in the creation of area code 651.

The dividing line between 612 and 651 largely follows the Mississippi River; generally, all of the metropolitan area east of the river transferred to 651, while the western half stayed in 612. An exception is the eastern half of the University of Minnesota, Twin Cities' campus, located in Falcon Heights. Due to an integrated telephone system serving both the Falcon Heights campus and the main campus in Minneapolis, the entire U of M remained in 612 after the 1998 split.

The area code splits in the Twin Cities are unusual because they split along municipal, rather than central office, boundaries. This led to a sizable number of exchanges being divided between two area codes, and a few being divided among three.

Even with the Twin Cities' continued growth, 651 is one of the few urbanized area codes without an overlay, making St. Paul one of the few large cities where seven-digit dialing would still be possible. Under current projections, it will stay that way for the foreseeable future; the latest NANPA projections do not include an exhaust date for 651.

Even with the split into four area codes (612, 651, 763 and 952), most of the Twin Cities region is still a single rate center. The four Twin Cities area codes comprise one of the largest local calling areas in the United States; with a few exceptions, no long-distance charges are applied from one part of the Twin Cities to another. Portions of area codes 320 and 507/924 are local calls from the Twin Cities as well.

== Service area ==
- Afton
- Apple Valley
- Arden Hills
- Bayport
- Birchwood Village
- Center City
- Chisago City
- Coates
- Columbus
- Cottage Grove
- Dellwood
- Eagan
- Falcon Heights
- Farmington
- Forest Lake
- Gem Lake
- Goodhue
- Grant
- Harris
- Hastings
- Hugo
- Inver Grove Heights
- Lake City
- Lake Elmo
- Lakeland
- Lakeland Shores
- Lake St. Croix Beach
- Landfall
- Lindstrom
- Lino Lakes
- Little Canada
- Mahtomedi
- Maplewood
- Marine on St. Croix
- Mendota Heights
- Miesville
- New Brighton
- New Trier
- Newport
- North Branch
- North Oaks
- North St. Paul
- Oak Park Heights
- Oakdale
- Pine Springs
- St. Marys Point
- St. Paul
- St. Paul Park
- Scandia
- Shoreview
- South St. Paul
- Stacy
- Stillwater
- Taylors Falls
- Red Wing
- Rosemount
- Roseville
- Vadnais Heights
- Vermillion
- Wabasha
- Welch
- West Lakeland
- West St. Paul
- White Bear Lake
- Willernie
- Withrow
- Woodbury
- Wyoming

== See also ==
- List of Minnesota area codes
- List of North American Numbering Plan area codes

Minnesota area codes: 218, 320, 507/924, 612, 651, 763, 952
	North: 320, 715/534	
West: 612, 763, 952	651	East: 715/534, 608/353
	South: 507/924	
Wisconsin area codes: 262, 414, 608/353, 715/534, 920/274
