= St. Marys Point, Minnesota =

City in Minnesota, United States

- City
- Location of the city of St. Marys Point within Washington County, Minnesota
- Coordinates: 44°54′59″N 92°46′15″W
- Country: United States
- State: Minnesota
- County: Washington
- Founded: 1951
- Incorporated: October 30, 1971

Government
  - Mayor: Jay Roettger

Area
  - Total: 0.392 sq mi (1.015 km^{2})
  - Land: 0.386 sq mi (0.999 km^{2})
  - Water: 0.0062 sq mi (0.016 km^{2})
- Elevation: 690 ft (210 m)

Population (2020)
  - Total: 353
  - Estimate (2022): 349
  - Density: 915.0/sq mi (353.27/km^{2})
- Time zone: UTC–6 (Central (CST))
  - Summer (DST): UTC–5 (CDT)
- ZIP Code: 55043
- Area code: 651
- FIPS code: 27-57292
- GNIS feature ID: 2396508
- Sales tax: 8.375%
- Website: stmaryspointmn.org

St. Marys Point or Saint Marys Point is a city in Washington County, Minnesota, United States. The population was 353 at the 2020 census.

== Geography ==
According to the United States Census Bureau, the city has a total area of 0.392 square miles (1.02 km^{2}), of which 0.386 square miles (1.00 km^{2}) is land and 0.006 square miles (0.02 km^{2}) is water. County 18 serves as a main route.

== Demographics ==
Historical population
Census	Pop.	Note	%±
1960	271		—
1970	319		17.7%
1980	348		9.1%
1990	339		−2.6%
2000	344		1.5%
2010	368		7.0%
2020	353		−4.1%
2022 (est.)	349		−1.1%
U.S. Decennial Census; 2020 Census

=== 2010 census ===
As of the 2010 census, there were 368 people, 149 households, and 104 families living in the city. The population density was 943.6 inhabitants per square mile (364.3/km^{2}). There were 164 housing units at an average density of 420.5 per square mile (162.4/km^{2}). The racial makeup of the city was 98.6% White, 0.3% Native American, 0.5% Asian, and 0.5% from two or more races. Hispanic or Latino of any race were 0.3% of the population.

There were 149 households, of which 28.2% had children under the age of 18 living with them, 56.4% were married couples living together, 8.7% had a female householder with no spouse present, 4.7% had a male householder with no spouse present, and 30.2% were non-families. 22.1% of all households were made up of individuals, and 6% had someone living alone who was 65 years of age or older. The average household size was 2.47 and the average family size was 2.88.

The median age in the city was 46.1 years. 23.1% of residents were under the age of 18; 5.5% were between the ages of 18 and 24; 18.7% were from 25 to 44; 40.5% were from 45 to 64; and 12.2% were 65 years of age or older. The gender makeup of the city was 50.8% male and 49.2% female.

=== 2000 census ===
As of the 2000 census, there were 344 people, 132 households, and 95 families living in the city. The population density was 853.0 inhabitants per square mile (329.3/km^{2}). There were 144 housing units at an average density of 357.1 per square mile (137.9/km^{2}). The racial makeup of the city was 97.67% White, 0.29% from other races, and 2.03% from two or more races. Hispanic or Latino of any race were 0.29% of the population.

There were 132 households, out of which 34.1% had children under the age of 18 living with them, 57.6% were married couples living together, 10.6% had a female householder with no husband present, and 28.0% were non-families. 22.7% of all households were made up of individuals, and 7.6% had someone living alone who was 65 years of age or older. The average household size was 2.61 and the average family size was 3.11.

In the city, the population was spread out, with 28.2% under the age of 18, 4.4% from 18 to 24, 27.9% from 25 to 44, 27.6% from 45 to 64, and 11.9% who were 65 years of age or older. The median age was 40 years. For every 100 females, there were 84.0 males. For every 100 females age 18 and over, there were 91.5 males.

The median income for a household in the city was $61,750, and the median income for a family was $75,441. Males had a median income of $41,875 versus $37,188 for females. The per capita income for the city was $36,905. About 2.9% of families and 5.8% of the population were below the poverty line, including 12.1% of those under age 18 and none of those age 65 or over.

== Notable people ==
- Karin Housley, Republican member of the Minnesota Senate
- Phil Housley, former NHL player and member of the Hockey Hall of Fame
- Stanley S. Hubbard, billionaire heir and CEO of Hubbard Broadcasting
