= Bayport, Minnesota =

City in Minnesota, United States

Bayport
- City
- Motto: "A Historic City on the St. Croix River"
- Location of the city of Bayport within Washington County, Minnesota
- Coordinates: 45°0′54″N 92°46′43″W
- Country: United States
- State: Minnesota
- County: Washington

Area
  - Total: 2.64 sq mi (6.84 km^{2})
  - Land: 1.73 sq mi (4.49 km^{2})
  - Water: 0.91 sq mi (2.35 km^{2})
- Elevation: 699 ft (213 m)

Population (2020)
  - Total: 4,024
  - Estimate (2021): 3,885
  - Density: 2,321.9/sq mi (896.48/km^{2})
- Time zone: UTC-6 (CST)
  - Summer (DST): UTC-5 (CDT)
- ZIP code: 55003
- Area code: 651
- FIPS code: 27-04114
- GNIS feature ID: 2394090
- Website: www.bayportmn.gov

Bayport is a city in Washington County, Minnesota, United States. The population was 4,024 at the 2020 census.

Bayport is along the St. Croix River, one mile south of Stillwater.

== History ==
The City of Bayport began as three small settlements along the St. Croix River. In 1873, the St. Croix Railway Improvement Company combined the three settlements into South Stillwater, which was incorporated as a village in 1881. Because many people confused South Stillwater with the city of Stillwater, the city changed its name to Bayport in 1922.

Like Stillwater's, Bayport's early economy centered on the lumber industry. From 1852 to 1916, several sawmills operated in the city. The Andersen Corporation is the successor to Bayport's early lumbering firms. The Andersen Corporation (then the Andersen Lumber Company) moved to Bayport in 1913 to take advantage of the city's rail lines, among other reasons. It prospered in Bayport, becoming the world's largest window and patio door manufacturer.

In 1914, the Minnesota Correctional Facility - Stillwater moved from Stillwater to Bayport. Experts at the time considered it one of the world's most modern penal institutions. As of 2010, the prison housed about 1600 inmates, who are counted as Bayport residents for census purposes. The maximum-security Minnesota Correctional Facility - Oak Park Heights opened just beyond Bayport's western boundary in 1982.

Due to its location on the St. Croix River, Bayport has long been associated with boating. The Bayport Boat Yard, just south of the Andersen Corporation, built several well-known steamboats. Barge construction and repairs continued at the boatyard through World War II. Today, the city is home to the Bayport Marina, and many boaters gain access to the St. Croix River at one of Bayport's public boat launches.

== Geography ==
According to the United States Census Bureau, the city has an area of 1.75 square miles (4.53 km^{2}), all land.

Minnesota State Highway 95 serves as a main route in the community.

== Demographics ==
Historical population
Census	Pop.	Note	%±
1880	601		—
1890	1,304		117.0%
1900	1,422		9.0%
1910	1,343		−5.6%
1920	1,936		44.2%
1930	2,590		33.8%
1940	2,633		1.7%
1950	2,502		−5.0%
1960	3,205		28.1%
1970	2,987		−6.8%
1980	2,932		−1.8%
1990	3,200		9.1%
2000	3,162		−1.2%
2010	3,471		9.8%
2020	4,024		15.9%
2021 (est.)	3,885		−3.5%
U.S. Decennial Census; 2020 Census

=== 2020 census ===
As of the 2020 census, Bayport had a population of 4,024. The median age was 37.3 years. 15.9% of residents were under the age of 18 and 11.6% of residents were 65 years of age or older. For every 100 females there were 208.8 males, and for every 100 females age 18 and over there were 249.9 males age 18 and over.

100.0% of residents lived in urban areas, while 0.0% lived in rural areas.

There were 1,038 households in Bayport, of which 33.7% had children under the age of 18 living in them. Of all households, 50.3% were married-couple households, 18.1% were households with a male householder and no spouse or partner present, and 24.8% were households with a female householder and no spouse or partner present. About 32.3% of all households were made up of individuals and 17.6% had someone living alone who was 65 years of age or older.

There were 1,092 housing units, of which 4.9% were vacant. The homeowner vacancy rate was 1.3% and the rental vacancy rate was 2.5%.

Racial composition as of the 2020 census
Race	Number	Percent
White	2,834	70.4%
Black or African American	779	19.4%
American Indian and Alaska Native	161	4.0%
Asian	38	0.9%
Native Hawaiian and Other Pacific Islander	0	0.0%
Some other race	22	0.5%
Two or more races	190	4.7%
Hispanic or Latino (of any race)	141	3.5%

=== 2010 census ===
As of the census of 2010, there were 3,471 people, 855 households, and 502 families residing in the city. The population density was 1,983.4 inhabitants per square mile (765.8/km^{2}). There were 912 housing units at an average density of 521.1 per square mile (201.2/km^{2}). The racial makeup of the city was 73.2% White, 19.1% African American, 4.8% Native American, 1.5% Asian, 0.2% from other races, and 1.2% from two or more races. Hispanic or Latino of any race were 4.1% of the population.

There were 855 households, of which 25.6% had children under the age of 18 living with them, 44.9% were married couples living together, 8.8% had a female householder with no husband present, 5.0% had a male householder with no wife present, and 41.3% were non-families. 34.4% of all households were made up of individuals, and 17.7% had someone living alone who was 65 years of age or older. The average household size was 2.20 and the average family size was 2.82.

The median age in the city was 36.9 years. 11.3% of residents were under the age of 18; 12.3% were between the ages of 18 and 24; 40.9% were from 25 to 44; 24.2% were from 45 to 64; and 11.4% were 65 years of age or older. The gender makeup of the city was 72.4% male and 27.6% female.

=== 2000 census ===
As of the census of 2000, there were 3,162 people, 763 households, and 489 families residing in the city. The population density was 1,739.0 inhabitants per square mile (671.4/km^{2}). There were 789 housing units at an average density of 433.9 per square mile (167.5/km^{2}). The racial makeup of the city was 72.93% White, 17.99% African American, 4.46% Native American, 0.70% Asian, 0.98% from other races, and 2.94% from two or more races. Hispanic or Latino of any race were 3.19% of the population.

There were 763 households, out of which 26.6% had children under the age of 18 living with them, 49.1% were married couples living together, 9.7% had a female householder with no husband present, and 35.9% were non-families. 31.1% of all households were made up of individuals, and 15.1% had someone living alone who was 65 years of age or older. The average household size was 2.28 and the average family size was 2.83.

In the city, the population was spread out, with 12.3% under the age of 18, 12.3% from 18 to 24, 47.3% from 25 to 44, 17.5% from 45 to 64, and 10.5% who were 65 years of age or older. The median age was 35 years.

The median income for a household in the city was $53,026, and the median income for a family was $62,917. Males had a median income of $36,375 versus $32,024 for females. The per capita income for the city was $18,490. About 2.0% of 420 families and 3.7% of the population were below the poverty line, including 5.5% of those under age 18 and 3.4% of those age 65 or over.

== Economy ==
Bayport is the headquarters of the Andersen Corporation, a major manufacturer of windows and doors.

== Parks and recreation ==
Bayport has four public parks that offer recreation facilities: Lakeside Park, Barker's Alps Park, Perro Park, and Village Green Park.

== Education ==
Bayport is in the Stillwater Area School District (ISD 834).

Public schools serving this area:

- Stillwater Area High School
- Oakland Jr. High
- Andersen Elementary School

Private schools serving this area:

- St. Croix Catholic School
- Salem Lutheran School

Charter schools serving this area:

- St. Croix Preparatory Academy
- New Heights Charter School

== Infrastructure ==
=== Prison system ===
The Minnesota Correctional Facility - Stillwater is in Bayport.
