= Lakeland Shores, Minnesota =

City in Minnesota, United States

Lakeland Shores
- City
- Motto: "A Special Place To Be"
- Location of the city of Lakeland Shores within Washington County, Minnesota
- Coordinates: 44°56′57″N 92°45′48″W
- Country: United States
- State: Minnesota
- County: Washington

Area
  - Total: 0.74 sq mi (1.91 km^{2})
  - Land: 0.32 sq mi (0.82 km^{2})
  - Water: 0.42 sq mi (1.09 km^{2})
- Elevation: 676 ft (206 m)

Population (2020)
  - Total: 339
  - Density: 1,072.5/sq mi (414.08/km^{2})
- Time zone: UTC-6 (Central (CST))
  - Summer (DST): UTC-5 (CDT)
- ZIP code: 55043
- Area code: 651
- FIPS code: 27-34658
- GNIS feature ID: 2395610
- Website: lakelandshores.govoffice.com

Lakeland Shores is a city in Washington County, Minnesota, United States. As of the 2020 census, Lakeland Shores had a population of 339.

== Geography ==
According to the United States Census Bureau, the city has a total area of 0.73 square miles (1.89 km^{2}); 0.32 square miles (0.83 km^{2}) is land and 0.41 square miles (1.06 km^{2}) is water. County 18 serves as a main route.

== Demographics ==
Historical population
Census	Pop.	Note	%±
1950	43		—
1960	52		20.9%
1970	72		38.5%
1980	171		137.5%
1990	291		70.2%
2000	355		22.0%
2010	311		−12.4%
2020	339		9.0%
U.S. Decennial Census

=== 2010 census ===
As of the census of 2010, there were 311 people, 117 households, and 84 families living in the city. The population density was 971.9 inhabitants per square mile (375.3/km^{2}). There were 122 housing units at an average density of 381.3 per square mile (147.2/km^{2}). The racial makeup of the city was 99.0% White, 0.3% Asian, 0.3% from other races, and 0.3% from two or more races. Hispanic or Latino of any race were 1.3% of the population.

There were 117 households, of which 29.1% had children under the age of 18 living with them, 65.8% were married couples living together, 4.3% had a female householder with no husband present, 1.7% had a male householder with no wife present, and 28.2% were non-families. 17.1% of all households were made up of individuals, and 4.3% had someone living alone who was 65 years of age or older. The average household size was 2.66 and the average family size was 3.10.

The median age in the city was 46.6 years. 22.8% of residents were under the age of 18; 5.5% were between the ages of 18 and 24; 19.5% were from 25 to 44; 42.5% were from 45 to 64; and 9.6% were 65 years of age or older. The gender makeup of the city was 50.2% male and 49.8% female.

=== 2000 census ===
As of the census of 2000, there were 355 people, 116 households, and 93 families living in the city. The population density was 1,092.8 inhabitants per square mile (421.9/km^{2}). There were 121 housing units at an average density of 372.5 per square mile (143.8/km^{2}). The racial makeup of the city was 99.72% White, and 0.28% from two or more races. Hispanic or Latino of any race were 1.41% of the population.

There were 116 households, out of which 50.0% had children under the age of 18 living with them, 75.0% were married couples living together, 4.3% had a female householder with no husband present, and 19.8% were non-families. 16.4% of all households were made up of individuals, and 7.8% had someone living alone who was 65 years of age or older. The average household size was 3.06 and the average family size was 3.48.

In the city, the population was spread out, with 31.0% under the age of 18, 7.6% from 18 to 24, 23.4% from 25 to 44, 29.9% from 45 to 64, and 8.2% who were 65 years of age or older. The median age was 38 years. For every 100 females, there were 117.8 males. For every 100 females age 18 and over, there were 104.2 males.

The median income for a household in the city was $80,907, and the median income for a family was $83,632. Males had a median income of $55,000 versus $35,000 for females. The per capita income for the city was $29,789. About 1.9% of families and 3.9% of the population were below the poverty line, including 4.5% of those under age 18 and 7.7% of those age 65 or over.
