= Vadnais Heights, Minnesota =

City in Minnesota, United States

- City
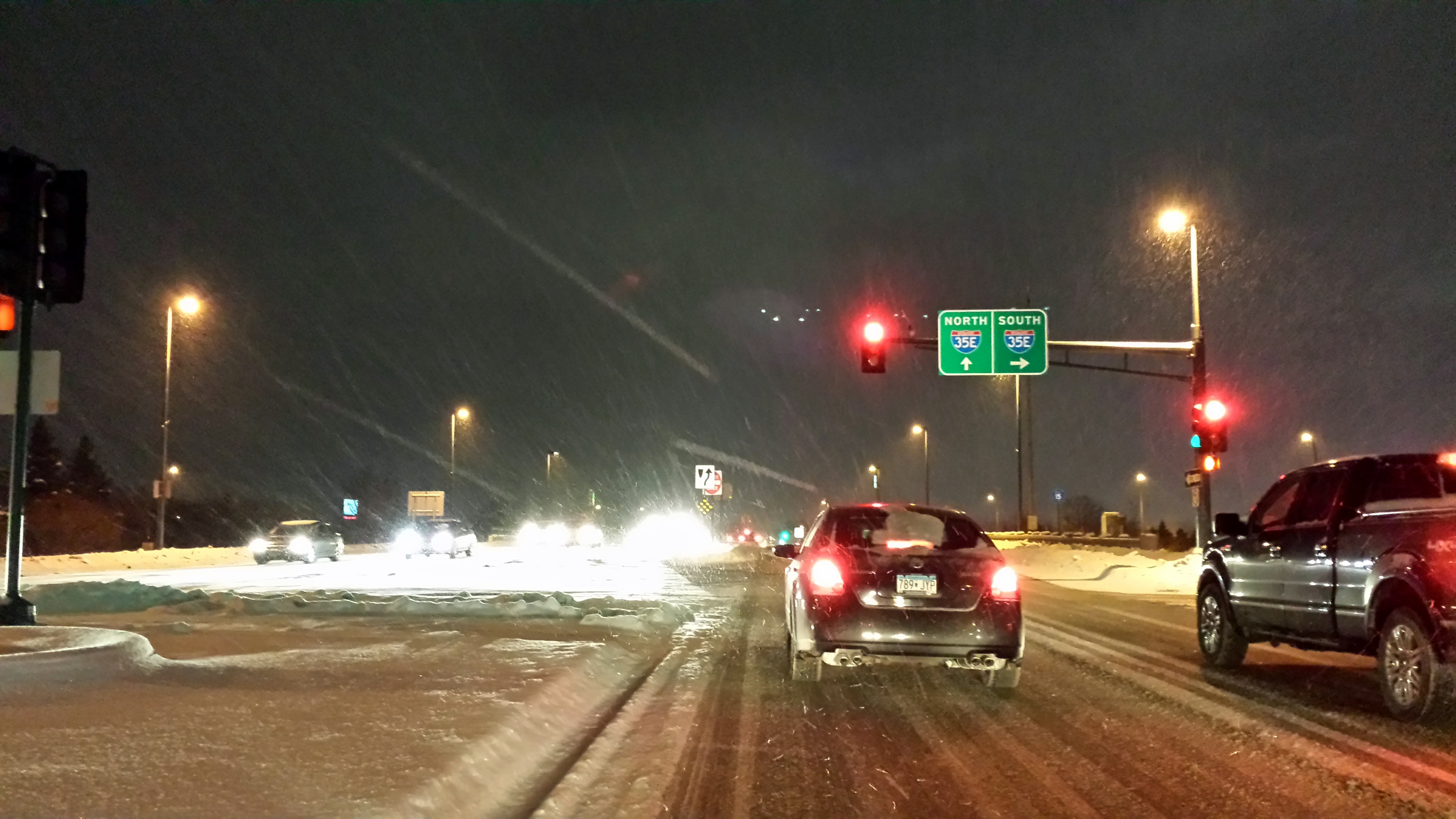
- Intersection in Vadnais Heights

- Logo

- Location of the city of Vadnais Heights within Ramsey County, Minnesota
- Coordinates: 45°03′25″N 93°04′29″W
- Country: United States
- State: Minnesota
- County: Ramsey
- Incorporated: July 24, 1957

Government
  - Mayor: Mike Krachmer

Area
  - Total: 8.22 sq mi (21.28 km^{2})
  - Land: 6.97 sq mi (18.05 km^{2})
  - Water: 1.25 sq mi (3.23 km^{2})
- Elevation: 906 ft (276 m)

Population (2020)
  - Total: 12,912
  - Estimate (2022): 12,713
  - Density: 1,852.3/sq mi (715.19/km^{2})
- Time zone: UTC−6 (Central (CST))
  - Summer (DST): UTC−5 (CDT)
- ZIP Codes: 55110, 55127, 55109
- Area code: 651
- FIPS code: 27-66460
- GNIS feature ID: 2397106
- Sales tax: 8.375%
- Website: cityvadnaisheights.com

Vadnais Heights (/ˈvædnɪz/ VAD-niz) is a city in Ramsey County, Minnesota, United States. The population was 12,912 at the 2020 census.

== Geography ==
According to the United States Census Bureau, the city has a total area of 8.24 square miles (21.34 km^{2}), of which 6.98 square miles (18.08 km^{2}) is land and 1.26 square miles (3.26 km^{2}) is water. It borders the cities of Shoreview, Little Canada, White Bear Lake, Maplewood, North Oaks, and Gem Lake.

Interstate 35E, Interstate 694, U.S. Highway 61, and County Highway 96 are four of the main routes in Vadnais Heights.

=== Climate ===
Vadnais Heights has a humid continental climate. This hot-summer subtype is typical of south-central Minnesota and includes wet summers and dry cold winters.

Climate data for Vadnais Heights, Minnesota, 1991–2020 normals, extremes 1981–present
Month	Jan	Feb	Mar	Apr	May	Jun	Jul	Aug	Sep	Oct	Nov	Dec	Year
Record high °F (°C)	54 (12)	60 (16)	81 (27)	88 (31)	98 (37)	102 (39)	103 (39)	107 (42)	93 (34)	88 (31)	78 (26)	67 (19)	107 (42)
Mean maximum °F (°C)	42.8 (6.0)	46.9 (8.3)	62.7 (17.1)	79.5 (26.4)	86.7 (30.4)	92.1 (33.4)	93.4 (34.1)	91.3 (32.9)	87.2 (30.7)	78.1 (25.6)	60.7 (15.9)	46.0 (7.8)	95.6 (35.3)
Mean daily maximum °F (°C)	24.6 (−4.1)	30.0 (−1.1)	42.2 (5.7)	56.5 (13.6)	69.4 (20.8)	78.7 (25.9)	82.7 (28.2)	80.7 (27.1)	73.0 (22.8)	59.0 (15.0)	42.7 (5.9)	29.5 (−1.4)	55.8 (13.2)
Daily mean °F (°C)	16.5 (−8.6)	20.7 (−6.3)	33.1 (0.6)	46.8 (8.2)	59.8 (15.4)	69.4 (20.8)	73.5 (23.1)	71.5 (21.9)	63.7 (17.6)	50.3 (10.2)	35.5 (1.9)	22.5 (−5.3)	46.9 (8.3)
Mean daily minimum °F (°C)	8.3 (−13.2)	11.4 (−11.4)	24.1 (−4.4)	37.0 (2.8)	50.3 (10.2)	60.1 (15.6)	64.3 (17.9)	62.4 (16.9)	54.4 (12.4)	41.6 (5.3)	28.3 (−2.1)	15.6 (−9.1)	38.2 (3.4)
Mean minimum °F (°C)	−17.9 (−27.7)	−14.5 (−25.8)	−3.5 (−19.7)	18.1 (−7.7)	33.8 (1.0)	45.1 (7.3)	51.7 (10.9)	50.4 (10.2)	36.5 (2.5)	23.9 (−4.5)	7.7 (−13.5)	−10.0 (−23.3)	−21.0 (−29.4)
Record low °F (°C)	−37 (−38)	−40 (−40)	−20 (−29)	1 (−17)	26 (−3)	34 (1)	36 (2)	42 (6)	25 (−4)	6 (−14)	−14 (−26)	−35 (−37)	−40 (−40)
Average precipitation inches (mm)	0.78 (20)	0.81 (21)	1.50 (38)	3.12 (79)	4.31 (109)	4.52 (115)	4.47 (114)	4.45 (113)	3.13 (80)	3.08 (78)	1.84 (47)	1.10 (28)	33.11 (842)
Average snowfall inches (cm)	8.5 (22)	6.4 (16)	6.5 (17)	2.1 (5.3)	0.0 (0.0)	0.0 (0.0)	0.0 (0.0)	0.0 (0.0)	0.0 (0.0)	0.2 (0.51)	4.9 (12)	10.2 (26)	38.8 (98.81)
Average precipitation days (≥ 0.01 in)	5.9	5.1	6.7	9.1	11.3	10.9	9.6	8.8	8.5	8.5	6.2	6.9	97.5
Average snowy days (≥ 0.1 in)	5.1	3.2	2.4	0.7	0.0	0.0	0.0	0.0	0.0	0.1	1.7	4.2	17.4
Source 1: NOAA
Source 2: National Weather Service

== Demographics ==
Historical population
Census	Pop.	Note	%±
1960	2,459		—
1970	3,411		38.7%
1980	5,111		49.8%
1990	11,041		116.0%
2000	13,069		18.4%
2010	12,302		−5.9%
2020	12,912		5.0%
2022 (est.)	12,713		−1.5%
U.S. Decennial Census; 2020 Census

=== 2020 census ===
As of the 2020 census, Vadnais Heights had a population of 12,912. The median age was 42.7 years. 20.7% of residents were under the age of 18 and 20.6% of residents were 65 years of age or older. For every 100 females there were 90.5 males, and for every 100 females age 18 and over there were 88.1 males age 18 and over.

100.0% of residents lived in urban areas, while 0.0% lived in rural areas.

There were 5,407 households in Vadnais Heights, of which 26.7% had children under the age of 18 living in them. Of all households, 49.0% were married-couple households, 15.0% were households with a male householder and no spouse or partner present, and 29.0% were households with a female householder and no spouse or partner present. About 28.7% of all households were made up of individuals and 13.7% had someone living alone who was 65 years of age or older.

There were 5,596 housing units, of which 3.4% were vacant. The homeowner vacancy rate was 0.7% and the rental vacancy rate was 5.5%.

Racial composition as of the 2020 census
Race	Number	Percent
White	9,635	74.6%
Black or African American	840	6.5%
American Indian and Alaska Native	37	0.3%
Asian	1,374	10.6%
Native Hawaiian and Other Pacific Islander	2	0.0%
Some other race	256	2.0%
Two or more races	768	5.9%
Hispanic or Latino (of any race)	607	4.7%

=== 2010 census ===
As of the census of 2010, there were 12,302 people, 5,066 households, and 3,340 families residing in the city. The population density was 1,762.5 inhabitants per square mile (680.5/km^{2}). There were 5,243 housing units at an average density of 751.1 per square mile (290.0/km^{2}). The racial makeup of the city was 84.9% White, 3.6% African American, 0.5% Native American, 7.6% Asian, 1.1% from other races, and 2.4% from two or more races. Hispanic or Latino of any race were 2.8% of the population.

There were 5,066 households, of which 29.2% had children under the age of 18 living with them, 52.3% were married couples living together, 9.8% had a female householder with no husband present, 3.8% had a male householder with no wife present, and 34.1% were non-families. 27.5% of all households were made up of individuals, and 9.2% had someone living alone who was 65 years of age or older. The average household size was 2.42 and the average family size was 2.97.

The median age in the city was 41.9 years. 22.3% of residents were under the age of 18; 7.7% were between the ages of 18 and 24; 23.4% were from 25 to 44; 34.2% were from 45 to 64; and 12.3% were 65 years of age or older. The gender makeup of the city was 47.3% male and 52.7% female.

=== 2000 census ===
As of the census of 2000, there were 13,069 people, 5,064 households, and 3,448 families residing in the city. The population density was 1,793.4 inhabitants per square mile (692.4/km^{2}). There were 5,132 housing units at an average density of 704.2 per square mile (271.9/km^{2}). The racial makeup of the city was 91.67% White, 4.53% Asian, 1.48% African American, 0.46% Native American, 0.47% from other races, and 1.38% from two or more races. Hispanic or Latino was 1.61% of the population.

There were 5,064 households, of which 36.4% had children under the age of 18, 54.2% were married couples living together, 10.5% had a female householder with no husband present, and 31.9% were non-families. 24.8% of all households were made up of individuals, and 6.3% had someone living alone who was 65 years of age or older. The average household had 2.57 people and the average family size was 3.12.

In the city, the distribution of ages was spread out, with 26.9% under the age of 18, 8.6% from 18 to 24, 32.0% from 25 to 44, 24.7% from 45 to 64, and 7.8% who were 65 years of age or older. The median age was 36 years. For every 100 females, there were 90.9 males. For every 100 females age 18 and over, there were 90.4 males.

The median income for a household in the city was $60,804, and the median income for a family was $74,178. Males had a median income of $48,611 versus $35,102 for females. The per capita income for the city was $30,891. About 2.5% of families and 3.2% of the population were below the poverty line, including 4.9% of those under age 18 and none of those age 65 or over.

== Parks and recreation ==
The city of Vadnais Heights has over 100 acres (0.40 km^{2}) of parkland spread across 14 different parks. Including play equipment, trails, hard surface areas, picnic shelters, soccer and softball/baseball fields, hockey and pleasure rinks, basketball and tennis courts, and restrooms.

Vadnais Lake is surrounded by protected land with miles of walking trails. There is no boating or swimming in the lake and fishing is only allowed in designated areas on the southwest side in order to protect the water quality as the lake serves as a water source for the Ramsey County area. It is also a Ducks Unlimited habitat.

== Education ==
White Bear Lake Area Public Schools (ISD 624) serves the majority of the area of Vadnais Heights, with the exception of the northwestern portion of the city served by Mounds View Public Schools (ISD 621). An elementary school in the White Bear Lake School District, Vadnais Heights Elementary, is located at Centerville Road and County Road E. An independent charter school, the Academy for Sciences and Agriculture High School, is located by Vadnais Lake.
