= Lake St. Croix Beach, Minnesota =

City in Minnesota, United States

- City
- Nickname: LSCB
- Motto: Life's a beach!
- Location of the city of Lake St. Croix Beach within Washington County, Minnesota
- Coordinates: 44°55′19″N 92°46′12″W
- Country: United States
- State: Minnesota
- County: Washington

Government
  - Type: Weak Mayor System
  - Mayor: Thomas McCarthy

Area
  - Total: 1.00 sq mi (2.60 km^{2})
  - Land: 0.56 sq mi (1.46 km^{2})
  - Water: 0.44 sq mi (1.14 km^{2})
- Elevation: 712 ft (217 m)

Population (2020)
  - Total: 1,043
  - Density: 1,854.7/sq mi (716.12/km^{2})
- Time zone: UTC-6 (Central (CST))
  - Summer (DST): UTC-5 (CDT)
- ZIP code: 55043
- Area code: 651
- FIPS code: 27-34865
- GNIS feature ID: 2395599
- Website: https://ci.lakestcroixbeach.mn.us/

Lake St. Croix Beach or City of Lake Saint Croix Beach is a city in Washington County, Minnesota, United States. As of the 2020 census, Lake St. Croix Beach had a population of 1,043.

== Geography ==
According to the United States Census Bureau, the city has a total area of 0.99 square miles (2.56 km^{2}); 0.55 square miles (1.42 km^{2}) is land and 0.44 square miles (1.14 km^{2}) is water. County 18 serves as a main route.

== Demographics ==
Historical population
Census	Pop.	Note	%±
1960	716		—
1970	1,111		55.2%
1980	1,176		5.9%
1990	1,078		−8.3%
2000	1,140		5.8%
2010	1,051		−7.8%
2020	1,043		−0.8%
U.S. Decennial Census

=== 2010 census ===
As of the census of 2010, there were 1,051 people, 458 households, and 282 families living in the city. The population density was 1,910.9 inhabitants per square mile (737.8/km^{2}). There were 502 housing units at an average density of 912.7 per square mile (352.4/km^{2}). The racial makeup of the city was 95.2% White, 0.2% African American, 0.3% Native American, 0.5% from other races, and 2.9% from two or more races. Hispanic or Latino of any race were 2.7% of the population.

There were 458 households, of which 26.9% had children under the age of 18 living with them, 48.5% were married couples living together, 9.4% had a female householder with no husband present, 3.7% had a male householder with no wife present, and 38.4% were non-families. 31.7% of all households were made up of individuals, and 8.5% had someone living alone who was 65 years of age or older. The average household size was 2.29 and the average family size was 2.90.

The median age in the city was 43.8 years. 20.3% of residents were under the age of 18; 6.6% were between the ages of 18 and 24; 25.3% were from 25 to 44; 36.1% were from 45 to 64; and 12% were 65 years of age or older. The gender makeup of the city was 50.2% male, 49.5% female, .2% non gender specific and .1% bi gender.

=== 2000 census ===
As of the census of 2000, there were 1,140 people, 462 households, and 308 families living in the city. The population density was 1,982.4 inhabitants per square mile (765.4/km^{2}). There were 487 housing units at an average density of 846.9 per square mile (327.0/km^{2}). The racial makeup of the city was 95.79% White, 0.35% African American, 1.05% Native American, 0.88% Asian, 0.26% from other races, and 1.67% from two or more races. Hispanic or Latino of any race were 1.84% of the population.

There were 462 households, out of which 31.4% had children under the age of 18 living with them, 54.5% were married couples living together, 8.4% had a female householder with no husband present, and 33.3% were non-families. 25.5% of all households were made up of individuals, and 6.9% had someone living alone who was 65 years of age or older. The average household size was 2.47 and the average family size was 2.97.

In the city, the population was spread out, with 24.8% under the age of 18, 6.9% from 18 to 24, 35.4% from 25 to 44, 24.6% from 45 to 64, and 8.2% who were 65 years of age or older. The median age was 37 years. For every 100 females, there were 99.0 males. For every 100 females age 18 and over, there were 104.0 males.
