= Log cabin (disambiguation) =

A log cabin is a small house built from logs.

Log cabin may also refer to:

== Places and historic sites ==
- Log Cabin, Texas, a city in Henderson County, US
- Log Cabin (Oak Park Heights, Minnesota), US
- Log Cabin (Bellevue, Nebraska), US
- Log Cabin (University of Pittsburgh), Pennsylvania, US
- Log Cabin railway station, a former railway station in New South Wales, Australia
- The Log Cabin, later Pod's and Jerry's, a cabaret and jazz club in Harlem, New York City, US

== Other uses ==
- Log Cabin Republicans, an American gay and lesbian political organization
- Log Cabin syrup, an American brand of pre-packaged syrups
- Log Cabin Wilderness Camp, a Boy Scout camp in the Inyo National Forest on the site of the Log Cabin Gold Mine
- Log Cabin, a Whig Party newspaper later merged into the New-York Tribune
- Log Cabin (quilt block)

== See also ==
- Log house, a larger, less rustic type of log home
- Log cabin campaign of William Henry Harrison in the 1840 U.S. presidential election
