= Dovers Building =

Coordinates: 37.811094°S 144.963886°E

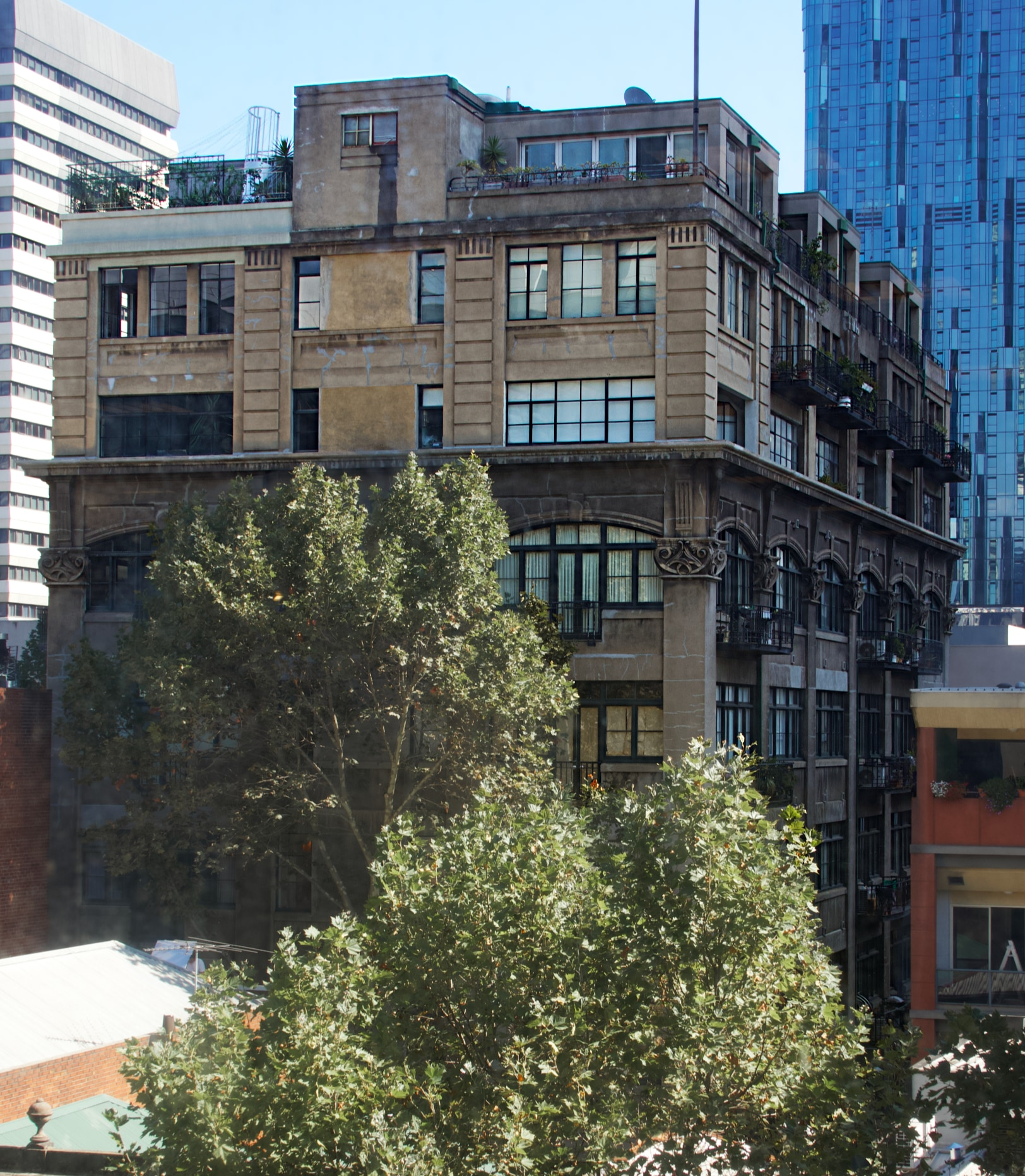
Dovers Building on the skyline, as seen March 2022

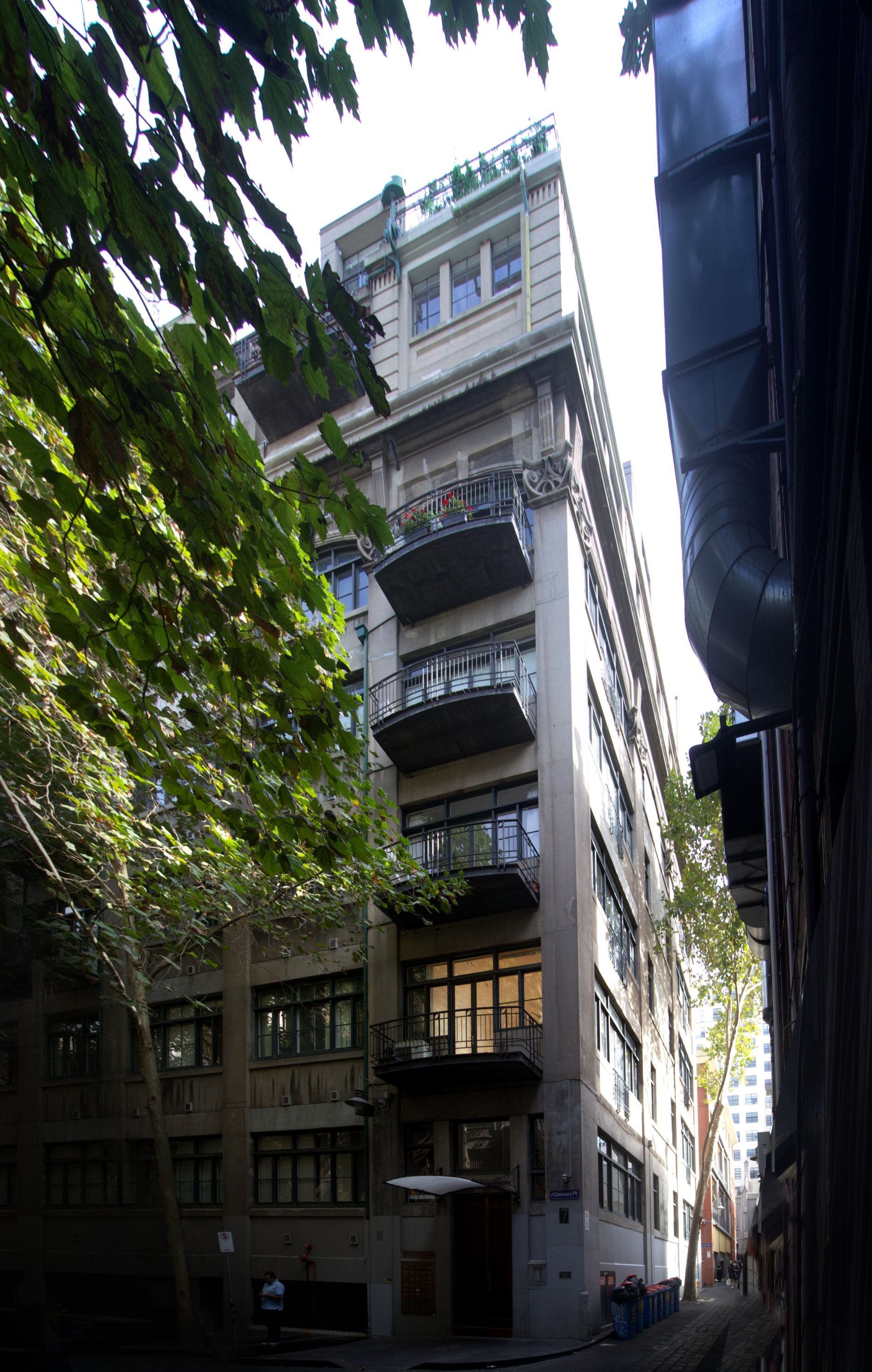
Dover Building from Ground Level Alleyway

Dovers Building, also known as the Sniders & Abrahams Building, is a heritage-listed building in Melbourne, Australia. It was built in 1908 by architect and engineer Hugh Ralston Crawford. Crawford held the Australian patent rights for the Turner Mushroom flat slab system which was patented by C.A.P. Turner in the United States in 1905. This system was so called due to the peculiar formation of rods around the column head and the rapidity with which they could be erected. Between 1906 and 1909, at least eighteen other buildings of this type were built in the United States.

Dovers Building was erected in 1908 as a warehouse and factory for the firm Sniders & Abrahams, a tobacco manufacturing company, and was the second example of Turner's flat plate system of reinforced concrete construction to be built. Erection began in the same year as Turners' Lindeke Warner Building in Minnesota. It was originally a five storey structure, with an extra two storeys added in 1938, also designed by Crawford.

Built during the Edwardian era in the Chicagoesque style, the facades are decorated with foliated capitals and arches at the top floor level of the original building, but otherwise the walls are not decorated.

Dovers Building was the first flat slab building in Australia, and Crawford subsequently designed a large number of other buildings using the Turner system. Dovers Building is listed on the Victorian Heritage Register.

== Bibliography ==
- Exporting American Architecture, 1870-2000, by Jeffrey W. Cody
- Miles Lewis [ed], Two Hundred Years of Concrete in Australia (North Sydney 1988), pp 26–7.
