= Hugh Ralston Crawford =

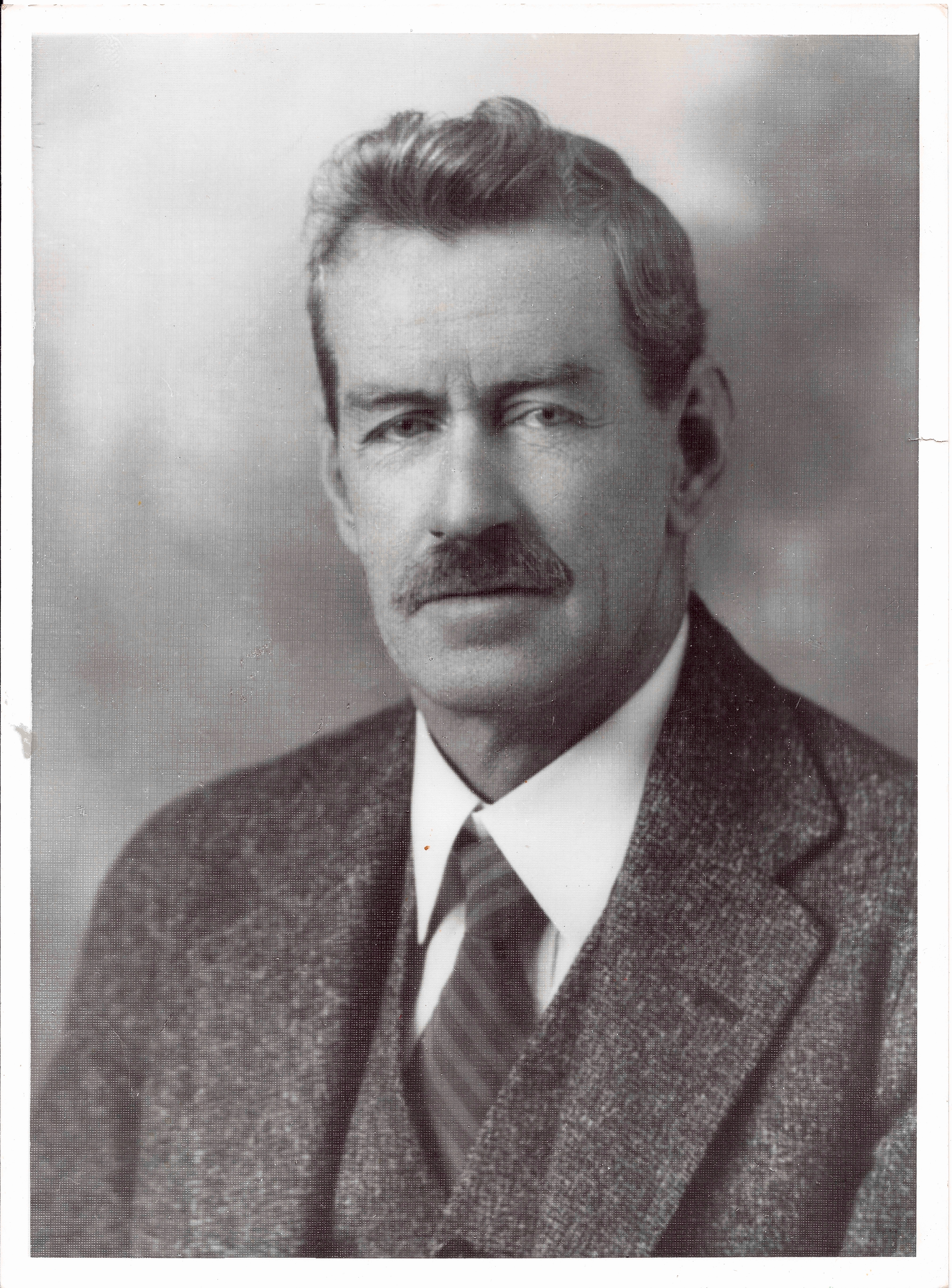
- Hugh Ralston Crawford
- Born: 1876; USA
- Died: 24 October 1954 (aged 77–78); Melbourne, Victoria
- Engineering career
- Discipline: civil engineer
- Projects: Dovers Building Victoria

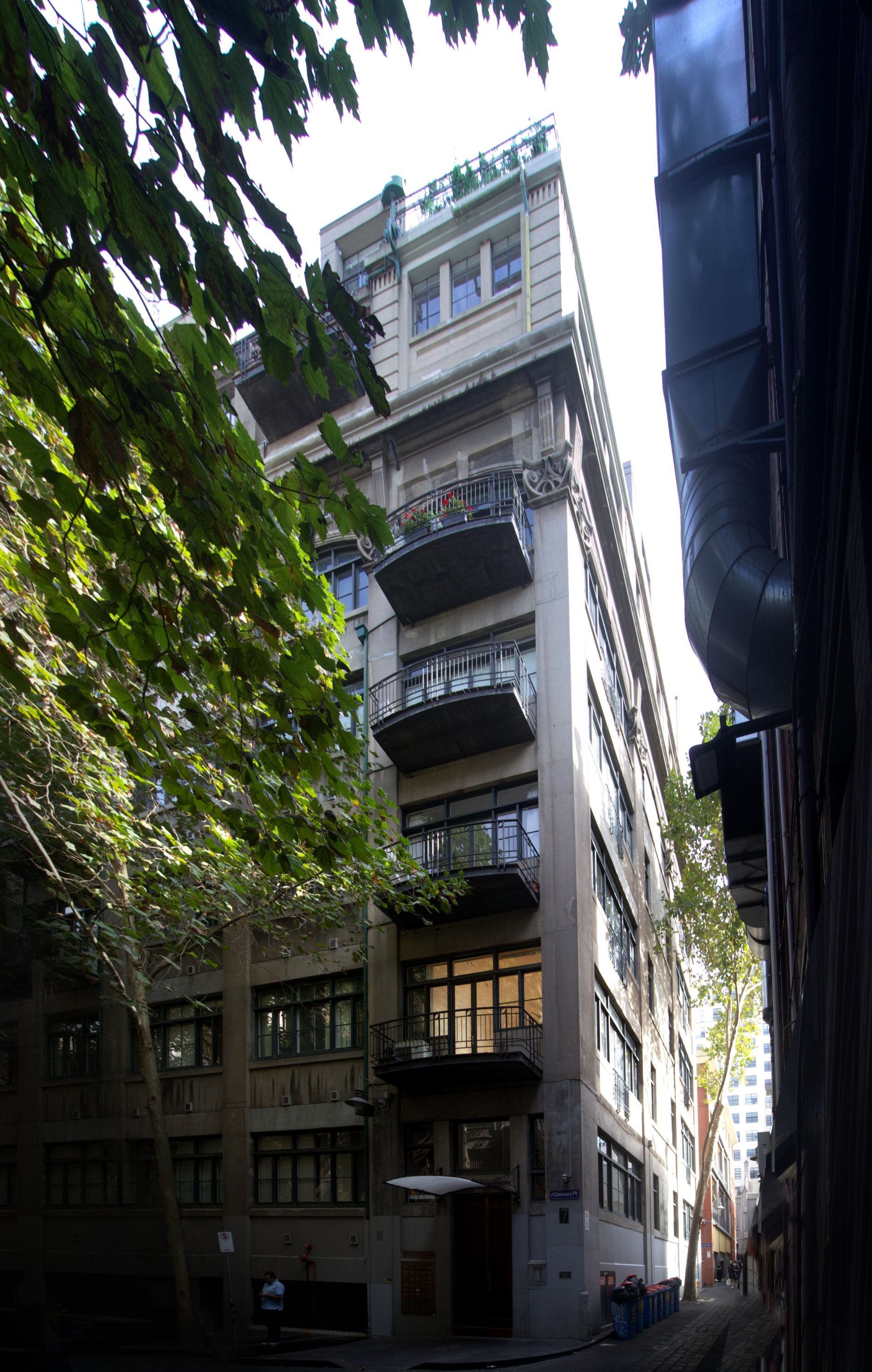
Dovers Building from Ground level - Alley entrance

Hugh Ralston Crawford (1876–1954), practiced both as an engineer and architect in Australia and the United States in the first half of the 20th century.

== Biography ==
Crawford was born in the United States in 1876, and moved to Queensland, Australia as a child. He was articled to the Townsville civil engineers and architects Eyre & Munro, and joined the Queensland Government's Bridge Department as a designing engineer in 1896, later becoming engineer in charge of railway construction. He also appears to have been in India for a time.

Crawford held the Australian patent rights for the Turner Mushroom flat slab system. This system was so called due to the peculiar formation of rods around the column head and the rapidity with which they could be erected. It was first described in the US in Engineering News in 1905 by C.A.P. Turner and his first flat-slab building was the Johnson-Bovey building of 1906. Some of these buildings still exist and at least one, the 1906 Hoffman (a.k.a. Marshall) building was designated an ASCE National Historic Civil Engineering Landmark in 2002. Between 1906 and 1909, at least eighteen other buildings of this type were built in the U.S.A.

Crawford was involved in applying the Turner system to the design of Dovers building in Drewery Lane, Melbourne in 1908. This was the 1st flat slab building in Australia using the system and Crawford subsequently designed a large number of other buildings using the Turner system.

Crawford was granted an Australian patent in 1907 for a monolithic reinforced concrete cavity wall, and built a number of Melbourne houses on this system.

From 1906 to 1914 Crawford conducted a private practice in Melbourne specialising in steel and reinforced concrete building. From 1914 to 1919 he was employed by the John S. Metcalf Company Limited of Chicago-Montreal, Canada to construct bulk handling wheat silos for the New South Wales Government in Australia. In 1919 he was appointed Consulting Engineer for concrete to the Commonwealth Government.

The means by which Crawford obtained the Australian rights to the patent, have not been discerned.

Crawford died at a Nursing Home near his Lansell Crescent, Camberwell home, aged 80, on 24 October 1958, survived by his wife Catherine, and children Dorothy, Colin, Gilbert, Max and Alan.

== Legacy ==
The locality of Crawford in Queensland and its railway station were named after him.

== Bibliography ==
- Exporting American Architecture, 1870–2000, by Jeffrey W. Cody
- Miles Lewis [ed], Two Hundred Years of Concrete in Australia (North Sydney 1988), pp 26–7.
