= Marshall Building =

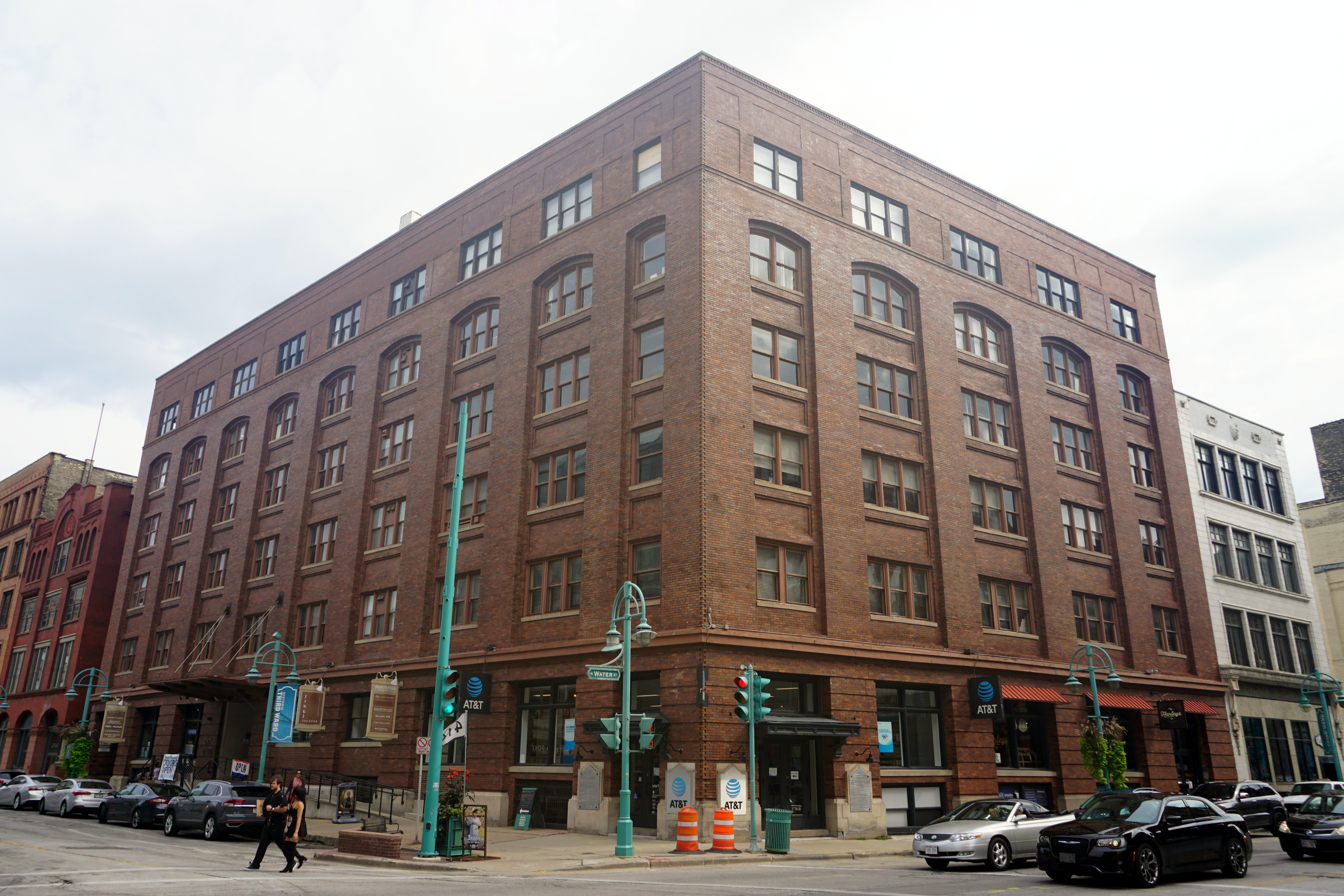
- Former names: Hoffman & Sons Co. Building

General information
- Location: 207 East Buffalo Street, Milwaukee, Wisconsin
- Coordinates: 43°2′1″N 87°54′31″W
- Completed: 1906

Technical details
- Floor count: 6

Design and construction
- Architecture firm: Ferry & Clas
- Engineer: John Geist
- Structural engineer: C.A.P. Turner
- Main contractor: Northwestern Tile Co.
- Historic Third Ward District
- U.S. Historic district – Contributing property
- Part of: Historic Third Ward District (ID84003724)
- Designated CP: March 8, 1984

The Marshall Building, formerly known as the Hoffman & Sons Co. Building, is a historic building in Milwaukee, Wisconsin, United States. Part of the Historic Third Ward, the six-story building is the oldest existing example of structural engineer Claude A. P. Turner's Spiral Mushroom System of flat-slab concrete reinforcement.

== History ==
The building was originally constructed as a five story structure in 1906 for John Hoffman & Sons Company, a wholesale grocer specializing in the manufacturing of coffee, tea and spices. When the project was in its early stages of design, Milwaukee consulting engineer John Geist came across an article written by Claude A.P. Turner in Engineering News about a new flat-slab system that Turner had developed for the Johnson-Bovey Building in Minneapolis, Minnesota. He traveled to Minneapolis to observe the load tests for the building and asked Turner to design a similar type of flat-slab system for the building in Milwaukee.

Turner's flat-slab system differed from previous reinforced concrete construction methods in that it consisted of only floor slabs and supporting columns, eliminating the need for beams below the floors. His Spiral Mushroom System, also known as the Turner System, referred to a cage of radial and tangential bars at the top of each column that imparted shear strength to the slab and also provided cantilever support.

A sixth floor was added to the structure in 1911 to accommodate the growth in Hoffman's business and was used to accommodate their coffee roasting equipment; however, beginning in the late 1920s the firm began to share space in the building with other manufacturers. The building was purchased in 1947 by developer George Bockl and was renamed the following year after his son Robert Marshall. Bockl sold the building in 1966 but later reacquired it in 1974.

On March 8, 1984, the building became a contributing property of the Historic Third Ward District.

In 2002, the Marshall Building was designated as a National Historic Civil Engineering Landmark by the American Society of Civil Engineers.

Today the building is primarily used as office space and art galleries.
