= Pine Springs, Minnesota =

City in Minnesota, United States

Pine Springs
- City
- Location of the city of Pine Springs within Washington County, Minnesota
- Coordinates: 45°1′51″N 92°57′27″W
- Country: United States
- State: Minnesota
- County: Washington

Area
  - Total: 0.92 sq mi (2.38 km^{2})
  - Land: 0.77 sq mi (2.00 km^{2})
  - Water: 0.15 sq mi (0.39 km^{2})
- Elevation: 965 ft (294 m)

Population (2020)
  - Total: 377
  - Density: 489.4/sq mi (188.97/km^{2})
- Time zone: UTC-6 (Central (CST))
  - Summer (DST): UTC-5 (CDT)
- ZIP codes: 55115, 55128
- Area code: 651
- FIPS code: 27-51316
- GNIS feature ID: 2396211
- Website: https://www.cityofpinesprings.org/

Pine Springs is a city in Washington County, Minnesota, United States. As of the 2020 census, Pine Springs had a population of 377.

== Geography ==
According to the United States Census Bureau, the city has a total area of 0.95 square miles (2.46 km^{2}); 0.80 square miles (2.07 km^{2}) is land and 0.15 square miles (0.39 km^{2}) is water. Interstate 694 and Minnesota State Highway 36 are two of the main routes in the community.

== Demographics ==
Historical population
Census	Pop.	Note	%±
1960	142		—
1970	138		−2.8%
1980	267		93.5%
1990	436		63.3%
2000	421		−3.4%
2010	408		−3.1%
2020	377		−7.6%
U.S. Decennial Census

=== 2010 census ===
As of the census of 2010, there were 408 people, 144 households, and 124 families living in the city. The population density was 510.0 inhabitants per square mile (196.9/km^{2}). There were 149 housing units at an average density of 186.3 per square mile (71.9/km^{2}). The racial makeup of the city was 89.5% White, 3.2% African American, 4.7% Asian, 2.5% from other races, and 0.2% from two or more races. Hispanic or Latino of any race were 2.9% of the population.

There were 144 households, of which 34.0% had children under the age of 18 living with them, 78.5% were married couples living together, 6.9% had a female householder with no husband present, 0.7% had a male householder with no wife present, and 13.9% were non-families. 11.8% of all households were made up of individuals, and 4.9% had someone living alone who was 65 years of age or older. The average household size was 2.83 and the average family size was 3.04.

The median age in the city was 50.3 years. 23% of residents were under the age of 18; 8.8% were between the ages of 18 and 24; 10.9% were from 25 to 44; 43% were from 45 to 64; and 14.5% were 65 years of age or older. The gender makeup of the city was 50.0% male and 50.0% female.

=== 2000 census ===
As of the census of 2000, there were 421 people, 140 households, and 120 families living in the city. The population density was 509.0 inhabitants per square mile (196.5/km^{2}). There were 141 housing units at an average density of 170.5 per square mile (65.8/km^{2}). The racial makeup of the city was 95.96% White, 1.43% African American, 1.19% Asian, 1.43% from other races. Hispanic or Latino of any race were 1.90% of the population.

There were 140 households, out of which 39.3% had children under the age of 18 living with them, 80.7% were married couples living together, 4.3% had a female householder with no husband present, and 13.6% were non-families. 11.4% of all households were made up of individuals, and 0.7% had someone living alone who was 65 years of age or older. The average household size was 3.01 and the average family size was 3.22.

In the city, the population was spread out, with 28.7% under the age of 18, 6.7% from 18 to 24, 20.2% from 25 to 44, 36.8% from 45 to 64, and 7.6% who were 65 years of age or older. The median age was 43 years. For every 100 females, there were 104.4 males. For every 100 females age 18 and over, there were 106.9 males.

The median income for a household in the city was $102,496, and the median income for a family was $104,670. Males had a median income of $61,250 versus $42,188 for females. The per capita income for the city was $38,383. None of the families and 0.5% of the population were living below the poverty line, including no under eighteens and none of those over 64.
