= St. Croix Crossing =

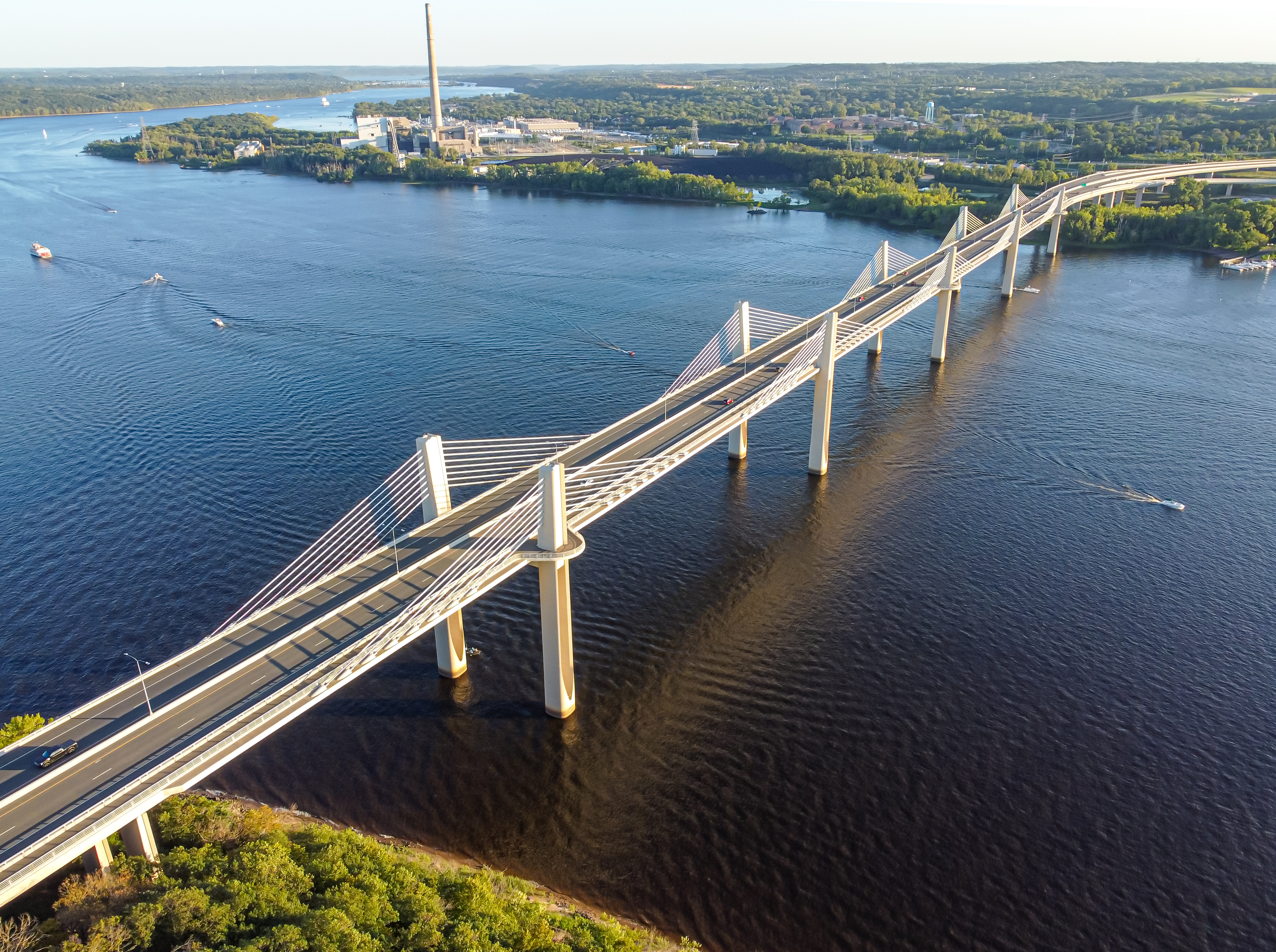
- The St. Croix Crossing with the Xcel Energy Allen S King power plant in background
- Coordinates: 45.042230°N 92.784948°W
- Carries: 4 lanes of MN 36 / WIS 64
- Crosses: St. Croix River
- Locale: Oak Park Heights, Minnesota and St. Joseph, Wisconsin
- Official name: St. Croix Crossing
- Maintained by: MnDOT and WisDOT

Characteristics
- Design: Extradosed bridge
- Total length: 4,660 feet (1,420 m)
- Clearance below: 150 feet

History
- Opened: August 2, 2017

Statistics
- Toll: None

Location
- Interactive map of St. Croix Crossing

The St. Croix Crossing is an extradosed bridge that spans the St. Croix River, between Oak Park Heights, Minnesota and St. Joseph, Wisconsin. Connecting Minnesota State Highway 36 and Wisconsin State Highway 64, the bridge carries four lanes of traffic (two lanes in each direction), and includes a bike/pedestrian path on the north side.

== History ==
MnDOT, WisDOT, and the Federal Highway Administration were seeking a replacement for the nearly 90 year old Stillwater Bridge, which was frequently congested, inadequate for modern traffic, and was deteriorating from its age. The St. Croix River Crossing Project called for the construction of a new four-lane bridge less than a mile downriver, followed by the conversion of the Stillwater Bridge to pedestrian and bicycle use. Originally, construction of this bridge was planned to start in 2024, but legislation was passed requiring the Department of Transportation to address aging bridges by 2018, and the start date was moved up to 2013. However, on March 11, 2010, a federal judge ruled that the government had violated its rules in approving the bridge design, which sent the process back to an earlier stage. Because the bridge traverses the Saint Croix National Scenic Riverway, construction could only proceed following federal legislation which granted an exemption to the Wild and Scenic Rivers Act.

Construction on the bridge began with the piers in 2014. The bridge was opened to vehicle traffic following a ribbon-cutting ceremony on August 2, 2017.

== Design ==
The extradosed bridge design results in fewer piers compared to a box girder bridge, improving maritime navigation and reducing environmental impact. While compared to a traditional cable-stayed bridge, tower height is lower and thus does not overwhelm the scenery of the Saint Croix riverway by keeping the tower height below that of the river bluff.

The bridge uses five piers in the river to support the bridge deck. Each pier consists of two towers, with one on each side of the deck to connect cable stays to. The project also includes seven additional piers on land to support the approach ramps to the main bridge.

Each tower includes eight cables on each side, for a total of sixteen cables per tower in a "harp" arrangement. Foundations in the river are drilled shaft style piles, and were installed using cofferdams.

The bridge uses dual box girders as its deck, each box containing three cells. The girders on the crossing are precast, and utilize post-tensioning to strengthen the girder segments against tension forces. Each bridge pier is able to support its corresponding bridge segment, allowing girder segments to be installed directly to each bridge segment individually during construction.

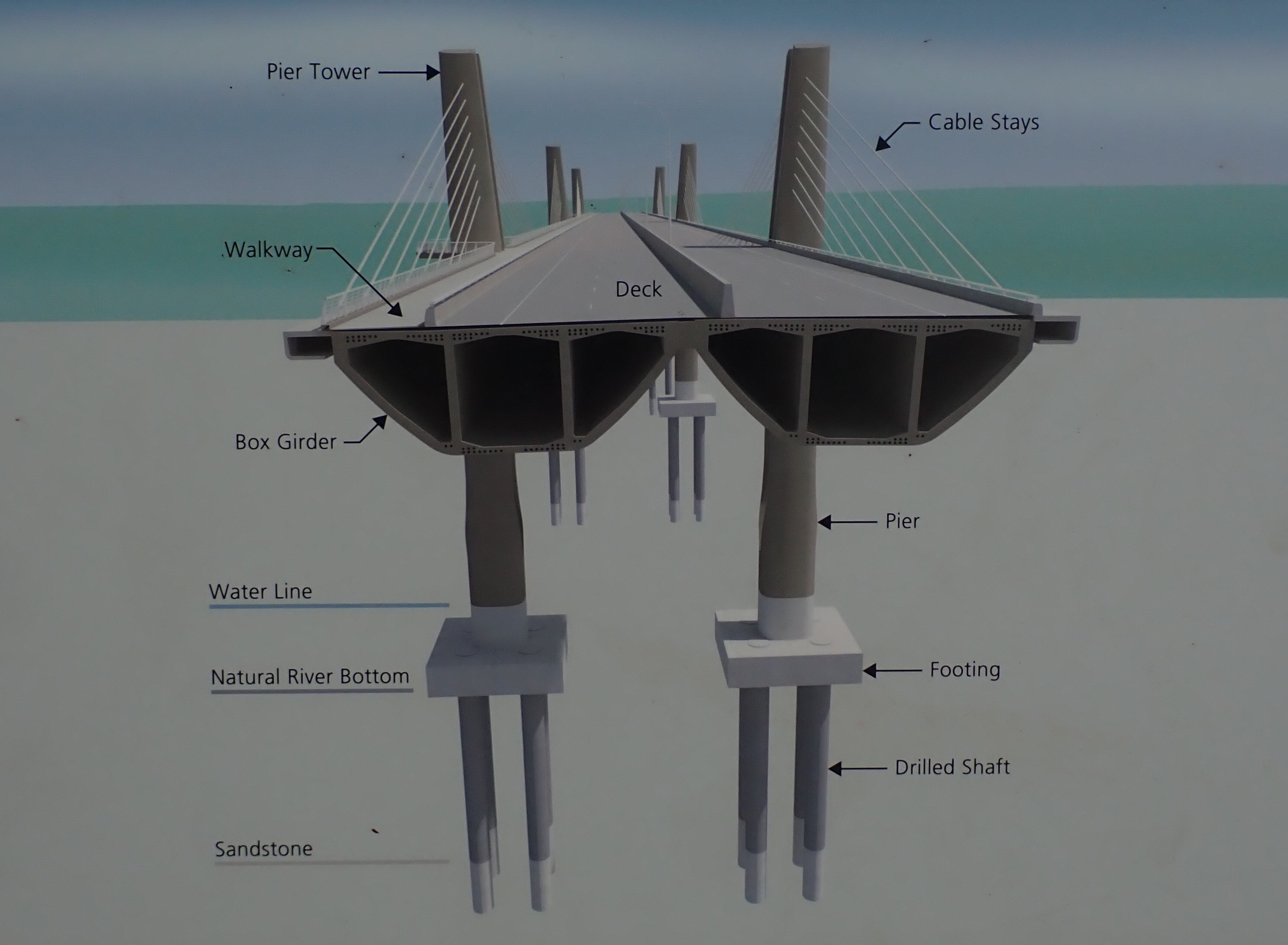
A diagram showing a cross section of the bridge, and the foundation hidden below the riverbed.

The bridge deck contains four lanes of traffic, two traveling in each direction, as well as a pedestrian walkway on the north side. The pedestrian walkway features curved lookouts at several of the bridge towers. A center median is present between the opposite directions of traffic, and have street light poles to illuminate the bridge deck for motorists.

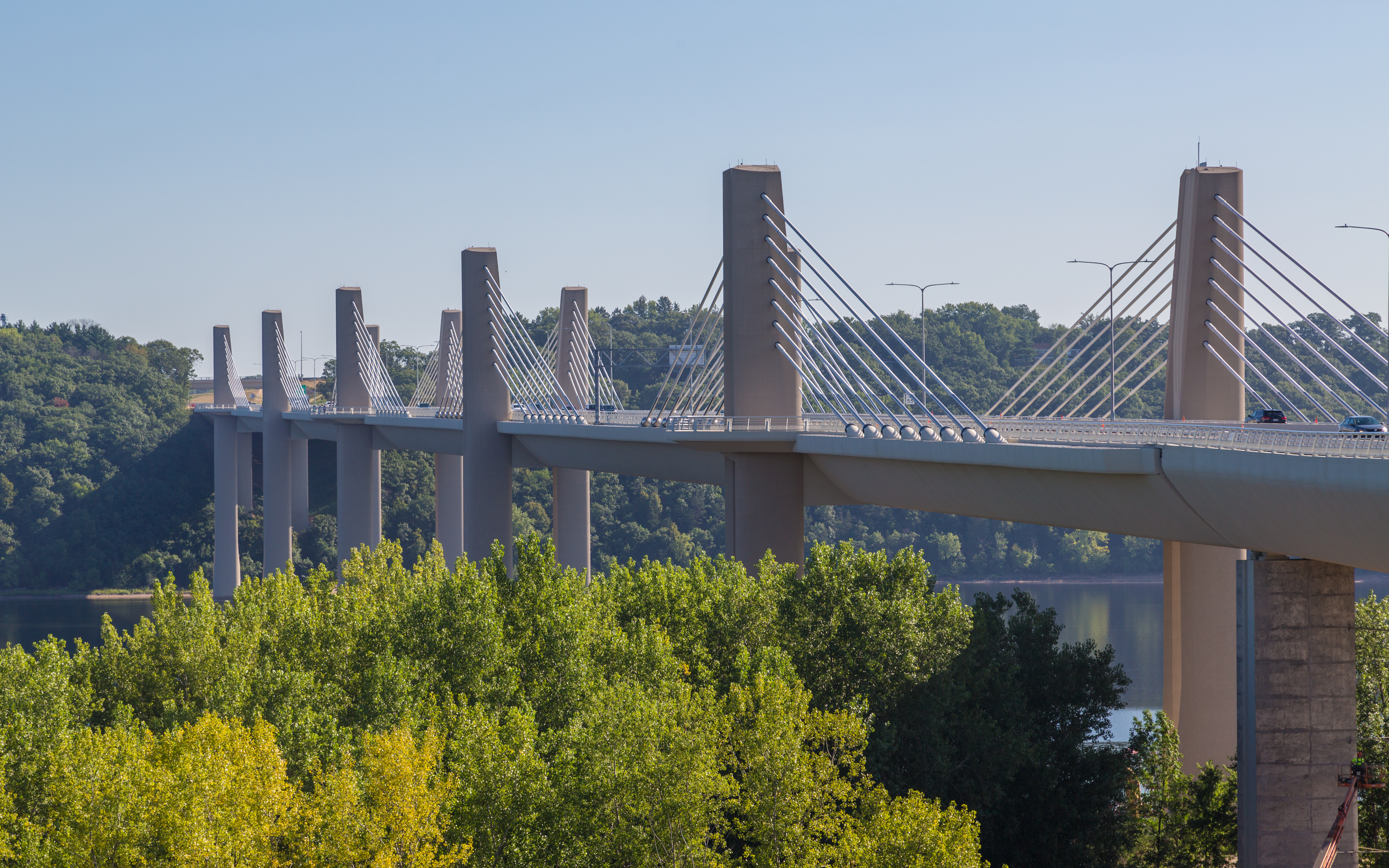
St. Croix Crossing viewed from Minnesota. The box girders that support the bridge are visible on the underside of the deck.

== See also ==
- Stillwater Bridge (St. Croix River)
- Soo Line High Bridge
- Prescott Drawbridge
