= Oak Park Heights, Minnesota =

City in Minnesota, United States

Oak Park Heights
- City
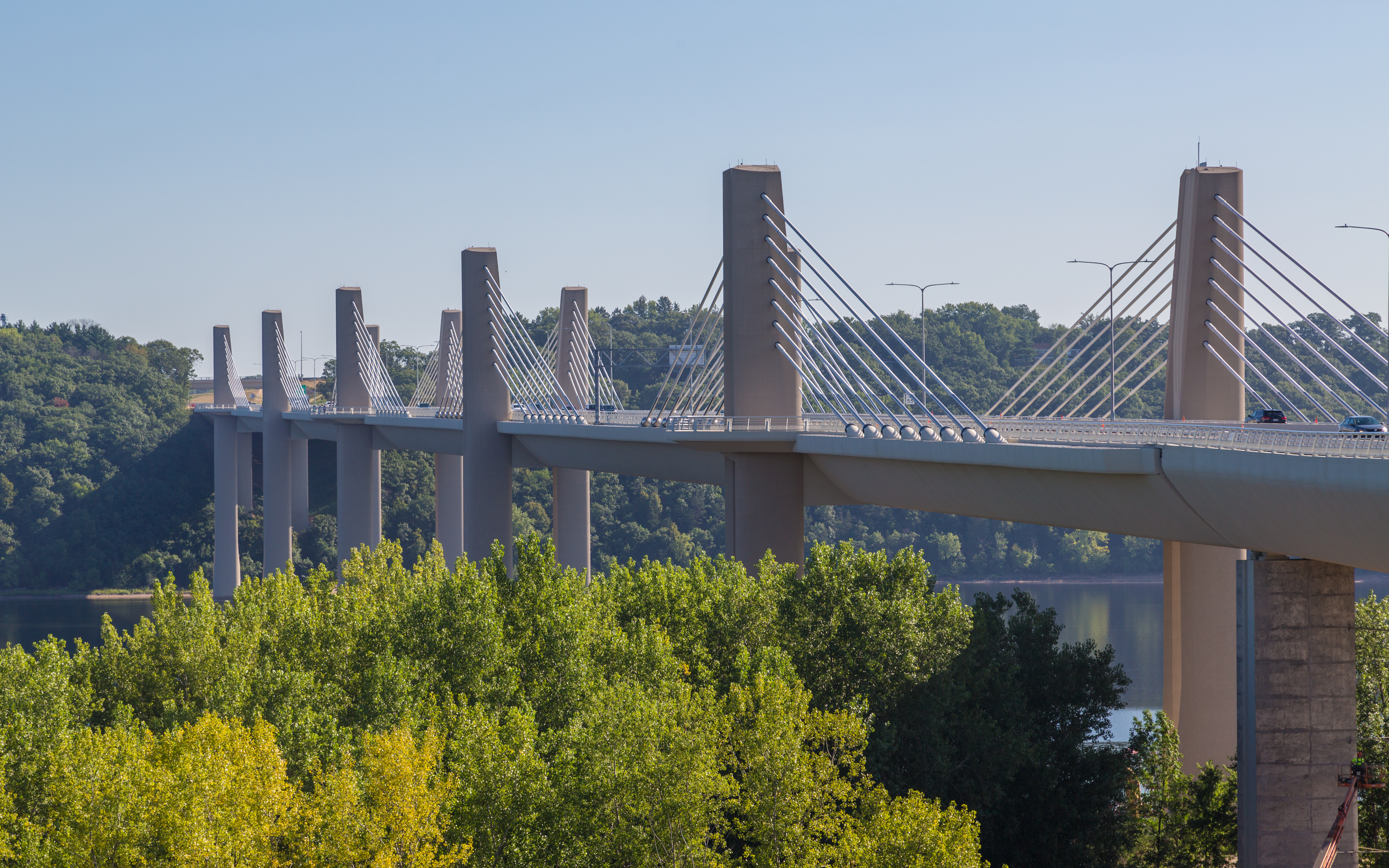
- St. Croix Crossing
- Motto: "The Good Life Happens Here"
- Location of the city of Oak Park Heights within Washington County, Minnesota
- Coordinates: 45°2′6″N 92°48′38″W
- Country: United States
- State: Minnesota
- County: Washington
- Platted: May 27, 1857

Government
  - Mayor: Chuck Dougherty

Area
  - Total: 3.34 sq mi (8.66 km^{2})
  - Land: 2.93 sq mi (7.58 km^{2})
  - Water: 0.42 sq mi (1.09 km^{2})
- Elevation: 915 ft (279 m)

Population (2020)
  - Total: 4,849
  - Estimate (2025): 4,625
  - Density: 1,657.3/sq mi (639.89/km^{2})
- Time zone: UTC-6 (Central)
  - Summer (DST): UTC-5 (CDT)
- ZIP code: 55082
- Area code: 651
- FIPS code: 27-47914
- GNIS feature ID: 2395285
- Website: cityofoakparkheights.com

Oak Park Heights is a city in Washington County, Minnesota, United States. It is on the west bank of the St. Croix River and is included in the Minneapolis–Saint Paul metropolitan area. The city is just south of Stillwater. Oak Park Heights' population was 4,849 at the 2020 census and had a population density of 1,456 inhabitants per square mile (562.2km^{2}). Oak Park Heights has many historical places like the Stillwater Overlook, and the Log Cabin.

== Geography ==
According to the United States Census Bureau, the city has a total area of 3.03 square miles (7.85 km^{2}); 2.98 square miles (7.72 km^{2}) is land and 0.05 square miles (0.13 km^{2}) is water.

Oak Park Heights is located adjacent to the city of Stillwater. Minnesota State Highways 36 and 95 are two of the main routes in the community.

== Climate ==
Oak Park Heights receives an average annual snowfall of 47 inches (1,193 mm). The average annual rainfall is 34 inches (863 mm). In the summer, temperatures average around 81 °F (27 °C) for a high, and 63 °F (17 °C) for a low. In the winter, temperatures average around 21 °F (-6 °C) for highs, and lows of 3 °F (-16 °C).

== History ==
Oak Park Heights was platted by John Parker, William Dorr, Gold Curtis, Mary Curtis, Olive Anderson, and William M. McCluer with the name Oak Park on May 27, 1857. The plat was located in present day Baytown Township, between Stillwater and South Stillwater (Now called Bayport.) Early settlers included David Cover, a river pilot who came to Oak Park in the 1840s and specialized in logs and lumber, and John Parker, who relocated from St. Croix Falls in 1850.

Oak Park was a prime area for industrial development for many settlers because of the town's close proximity to the St. Croix River. Because of this, in the 1880s, construction began on a sawmill and a barrel making company along the riverfront of Oak Park. In around 1890, Jewish settlers, Moritz and Bertha Bergstein, settled in Oak Park and established and operated a waste materials yard with a warehouse and “shoddy” mill, where waste fabric was recycled into stuffing for mattresses. The Moritz Bergstein Shoddy Mill and Warehouse still stands today in Downtown Stillwater, after being moved from Oak Park Heights when the St. Croix Crossing bridge was being constructed in 2012.

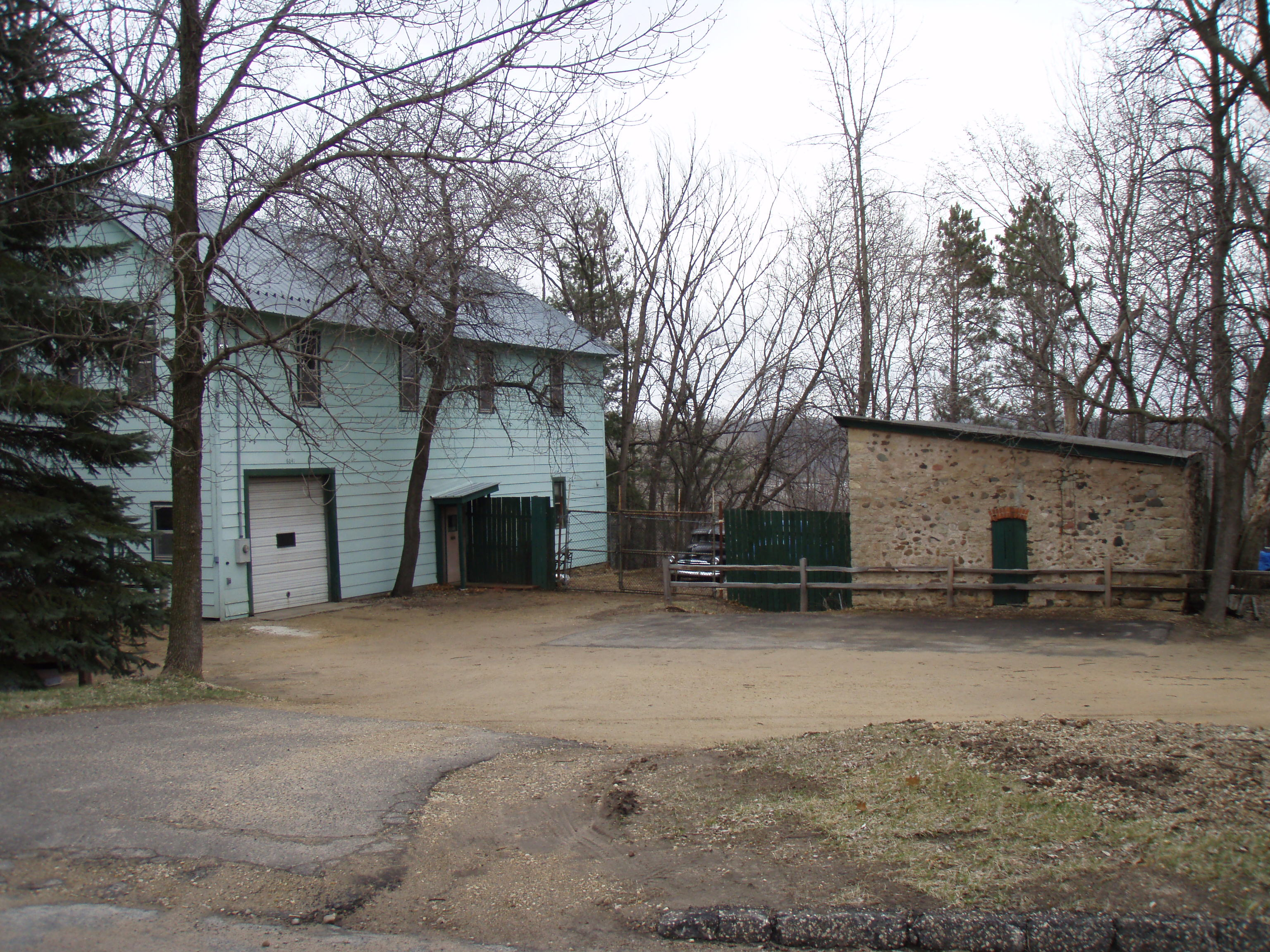
The Moritz Bergstein Shoddy Mill in their original location in Oak Park Heights.

Due to Oak Park's proximity to Stillwater, and connectedness to Saint Paul via the Twin City Rapid Transit Company streetcar station in Stillwater in the 1910s, the city attracted a few hundred wealthy residents that built homes on the bluffs overlooking the St. Croix River. By 1914 the new Minnesota Correctional Facility – Stillwater had been built next to Oak Park, bringing new economic activity to the area.

Later, in the 1930s, Minnesota State Highway 36 was constructed straight through the community, dividing the community, but connecting the area to the Twin Cities, which brought automobile tourists to flock to the valley. One homage to the time period includes the Club Tara Hideaway. This log cabin style roadhouse, which was built in 1932 under the name Lynch’s Chicken Shack, is still in business today. In 1938, the National Youth Administration constructed a automobile lookout over the St. Croix River on Lookout Trail. The 1932 Log Cabin restaurant and 1939 Stillwater Overlook are listed on the National Register of Historic Places.

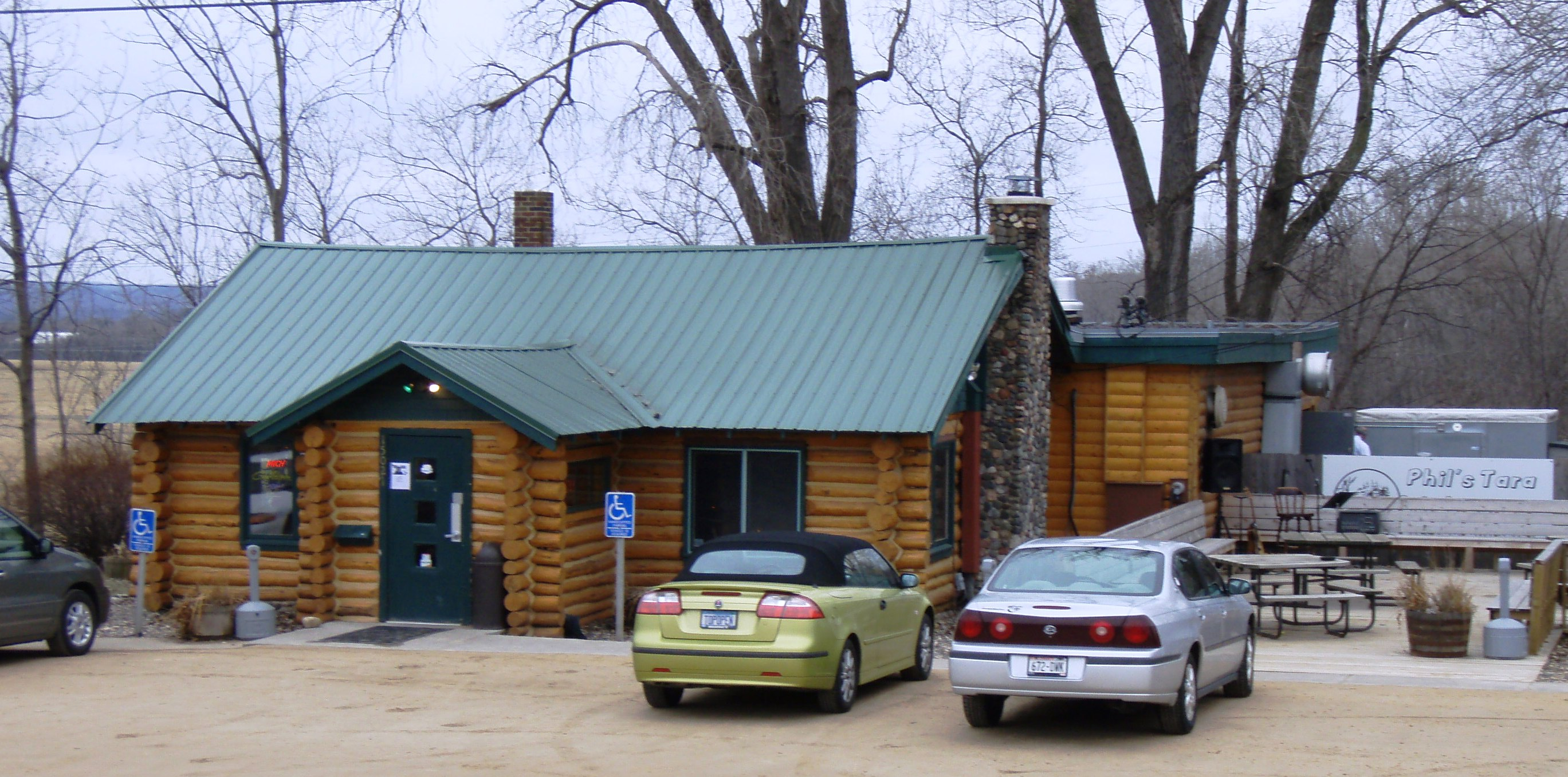
Club Tara in 2008

In 1938, the community was re-platted and re-named to Oak Park Heights. The town officially incorporated in 1959.

In the 1960s, construction started on the St. Croix Mall. This started a flood of commercial development in Oak Park Heights along the Highway 36 corridor which featured dozens of big-box stores, fast-food restaurants, and apartments.

Improvements to Highways 36 and 95, and the construction of the Allen S. King generating plant and its power lines in the 1970s had considerable impact on the residents living in the community.

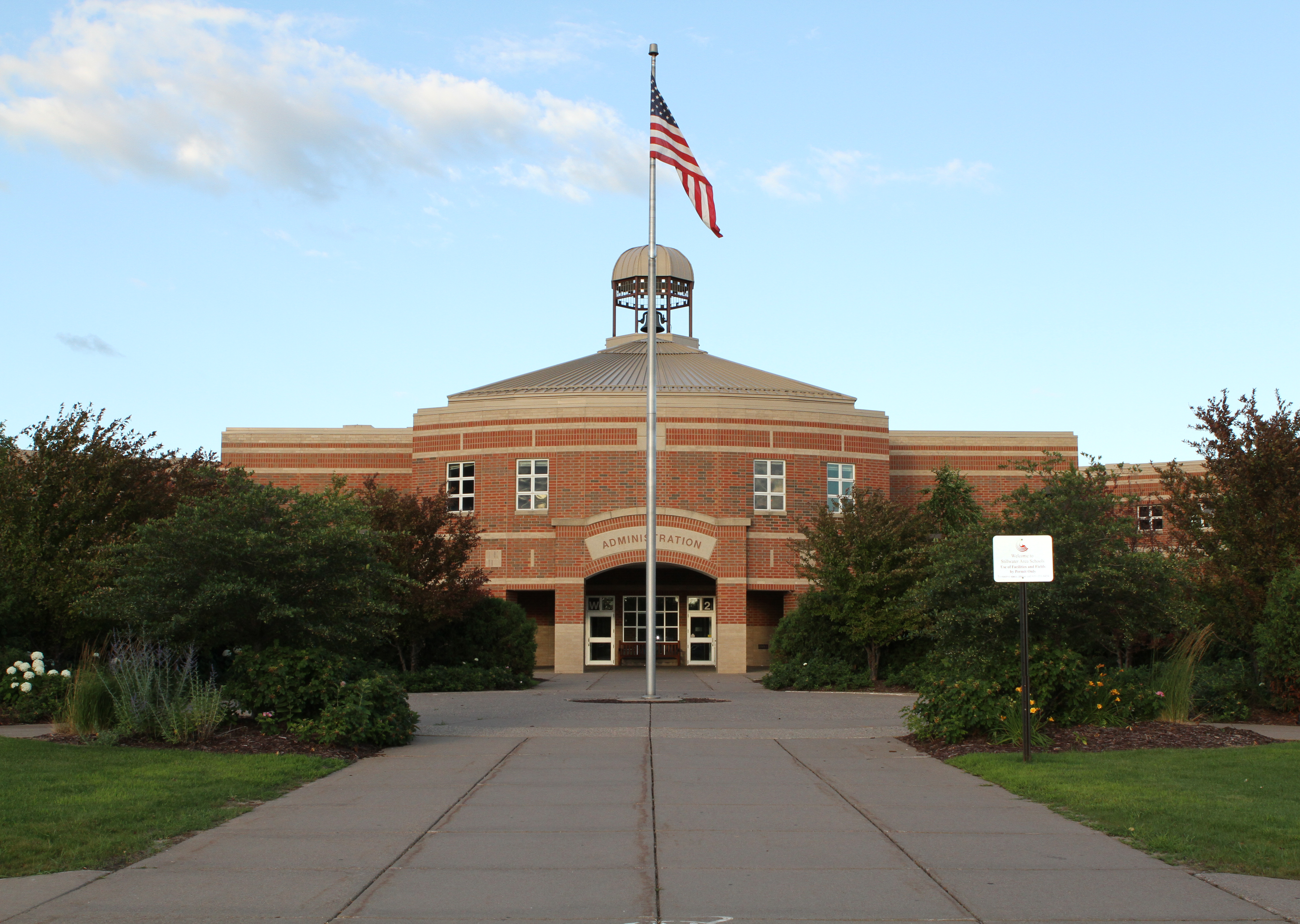
Stillwater Area High School

In the 1990s, the new Stillwater Area High School was constructed just south of Highway 36. The city's growth has sped up since then, adding more than 1,000 residents since 1990, to about 4,849 in 2020.

== Construction of the St. Croix Crossing ==
In the 1990s, many blocks in the original townsite were destroyed using Eminent domain to construct the new St. Croix Crossing bridge, which carried Minnesota State Highway 36 over the St. Croix River towards Wisconsin. The construction plan also included a new Diamond interchange with Minnesota State Highway 95. The original site of the Moritz Bergstein Shoddy Mill stood in this neighborhood, and was moved to Downtown Stillwater during the construction of the bridge.

== Demographics ==
Historical population
Census	Pop.	Note	%±
1950	580		—
1960	332		−42.8%
1970	1,238		272.9%
1980	2,591		109.3%
1990	3,486		34.5%
2000	3,957		13.5%
2010	4,339		9.7%
2020	4,849		11.8%
2025 (est.)	4,625		−4.6%
U.S. Decennial Census; 2020 Census

=== 2020 census ===
As of the 2020 census, Oak Park Heights had a population of 4,849. The median age was 53.5 years. 14.3% of residents were under the age of 18 and 35.4% of residents were 65 years of age or older. For every 100 females there were 97.7 males, and for every 100 females age 18 and over there were 95.9 males age 18 and over.

100.0% of residents lived in urban areas, while 0.0% lived in rural areas.

There were 2,258 households in Oak Park Heights, of which 15.9% had children under the age of 18 living in them. Of all households, 35.3% were married-couple households, 20.3% were households with a male householder and no spouse or partner present, and 39.5% were households with a female householder and no spouse or partner present. About 48.4% of all households were made up of individuals and 32.4% had someone living alone who was 65 years of age or older.

There were 2,422 housing units, of which 6.8% were vacant. The homeowner vacancy rate was 1.1% and the rental vacancy rate was 5.9%.

Racial composition as of the 2020 census
Race	Number	Percent
White	4,112	84.8%
Black or African American	232	4.8%
American Indian and Alaska Native	54	1.1%
Asian	154	3.2%
Native Hawaiian and Other Pacific Islander	1	0.0%
Some other race	58	1.2%
Two or more races	238	4.9%
Hispanic or Latino (of any race)	149	3.1%

=== 2010 census ===
As of the census of 2010, there were 4,339 people, 1,842 households, and 980 families living in the city. The population density was 1,456.0 inhabitants per square mile (562.2/km^{2}). There were 2,039 housing units at an average density of 684.2 per square mile (264.2/km^{2}). The racial makeup of the city was 89.8% White, 4.5% African American, 1.6% Native American, 2.0% Asian, 0.5% from other races, and 1.5% from two or more races. Hispanic or Latino of any race were 3.0% of the population.

There were 1,842 households, of which 23.1% had children under the age of 18 living with them, 40.7% were married couples living together, 8.5% had a female householder with no husband present, 4.1% had a male householder with no wife present, and 46.8% were non-families. 42.6% of all households were made up of individuals, and 24.4% had someone living alone who was 65 years of age or older. The average household size was 2.06 and the average family size was 2.83.

The median age in the city was 44.9 years. 17.8% of residents were under the age of 18; 8% were between the ages of 18 and 24; 24.3% were from 25 to 44; 27% were from 45 to 64; and 23% were 65 years of age or older. The gender makeup of the city was 52.1% male and 47.9% female.

=== 2000 census ===
As of the census of 2000, there were 3,957 people, 1,528 households, and 921 families living in the city. The population density was 1,313.6 inhabitants per square mile (507.2/km^{2}). There were 1,581 housing units at an average density of 524.8 per square mile (202.6/km^{2}). The racial makeup of the city was 91.03% White, 4.42% African American, 0.91% Native American, 1.29% Asian, 0.03% Pacific Islander, 0.63% from other races, and 1.69% from two or more races. Hispanic or Latino of any race were 2.10% of the population.

There were 1,528 households, out of which 30.6% had children under the age of 18 living with them, 45.7% were married couples living together, 10.1% had a female householder with no husband present, and 39.7% were non-families. 34.8% of all households were made up of individuals, and 16.2% had someone living alone who was 65 years of age or older. The average household size was 2.26 and the average family size was 2.94.

In the city, the population was spread out, with 21.8% under the age of 18, 9.1% from 18 to 24, 34.4% from 25 to 44, 21.8% from 45 to 64, and 12.8% who were 65 years of age or older. The median age was 36 years. For every 100 females, there were 117.5 males. For every 100 females age 18 and over, there were 119.3 males.

The median income for a household in the city was $48,425, and the median income for a family was $69,485. Males had a median income of $46,558 versus $30,788 for females. The per capita income for the city was $23,293. About 2.1% of families and 3.4% of the population were below the poverty line, including 2.9% of those under age 18 and 6.2% of those age 65 or over.
