= Log Cabin (Oak Park Heights, Minnesota) =

Historic restaurant in Minnesota, U.S.

- U.S. National Register of Historic Places
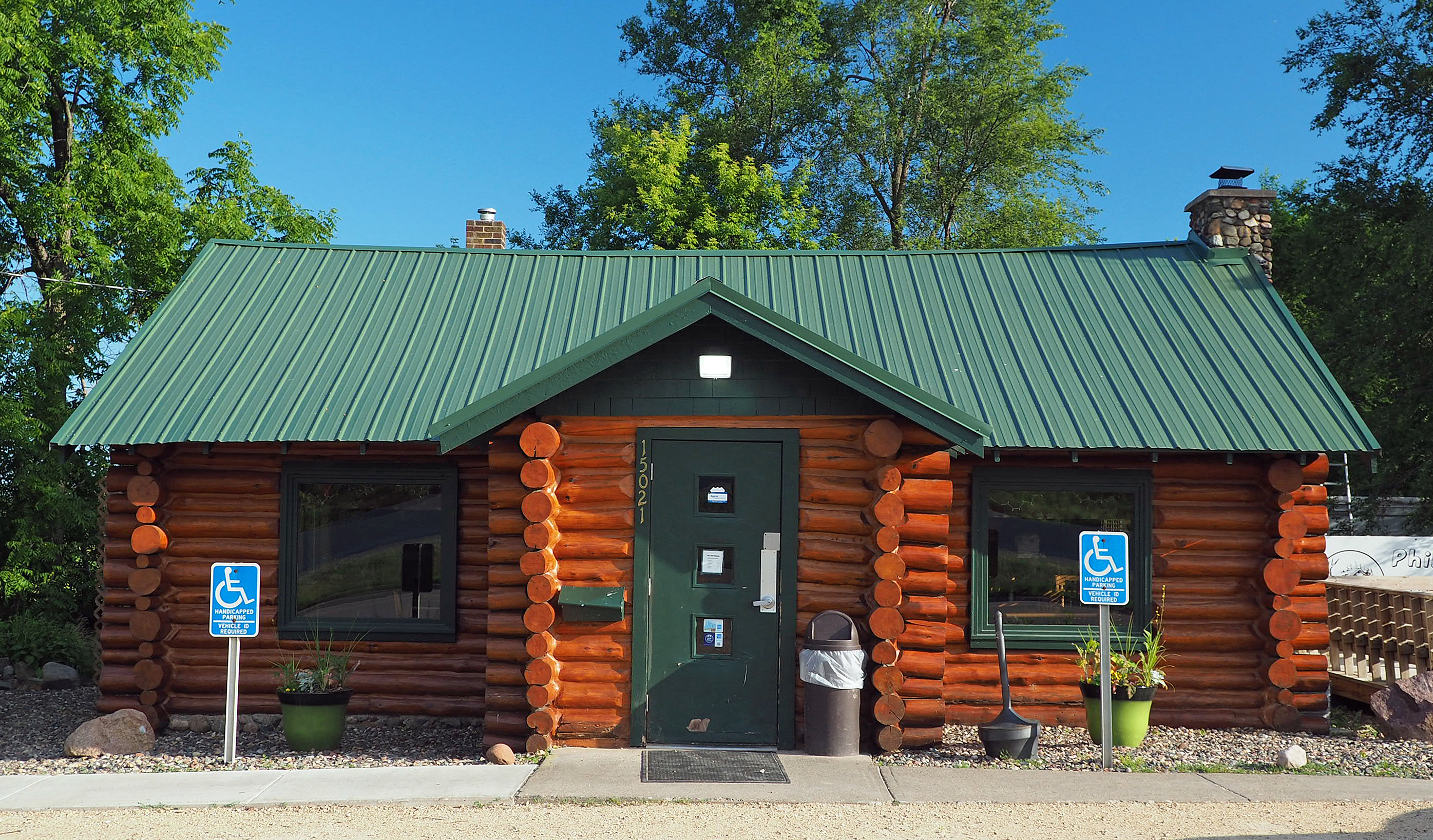
- The Log Cabin from the north

- Location within Minnesota Location within the United States
- Location: 15021 60th Street North, Oak Park Heights, Minnesota
- Coordinates: 45°2′7″N 92°48′6.7″W
- Area: Less than one acre
- Built: 1932
- Architectural style: Log Revival
- NRHP reference No.: 07001317
- Designated: December 27, 2007

The Log Cabin is a historic restaurant in Oak Park Heights, Minnesota, United States. It was established in 1932 as a roadhouse—an eatery and nightclub catering to motorists in an isolated location. Opening in the last years of Prohibition, it was rumored to serve illegal alcohol and harbor gangsters. The Log Cabin was listed on the National Register of Historic Places in 2007 for its local significance in the themes of architecture and commerce. It was nominated for its associations with the roadhouse network that developed in the early-20th-century St. Croix Valley, and for its quaint log cabin motif designed to attract the first generation of automobile travelers. Over the years it has operated under the names Club Tara Hideaway, Club Tara, and—since 1997—Phil's Tara Hideaway.

== History ==
In 1929 Gerald "Whitey" Lynch and his older brother Eugene opened a business called Lynch's Chicken Shack on the site, which was situated on a fairly isolated stretch of highway (now Minnesota State Highway 36) on the outskirts of Stillwater. A fire in May 1932 destroyed the Chicken Shack, but Gerald Lynch decided to rebuild and chose a log cabin motif as an homage to Stillwater's logging heritage. Newspaper articles and anecdotal evidence connect the site to the Prohibition era's underground economy of roadhouses. These isolated but easily accessible businesses, strategically located just outside city limits, were rumored to provide alcohol, gambling, prostitution, and safe harbor for gangsters. Corrupt officials had made Saint Paul a haven for Midwestern gangsters, and the St. Croix Valley had its own network of roadhouses. Al Capone is said to have stopped at this roadhouse while checking on his interests in Minnesota, and John Dillinger was supposedly a frequent guest. Baby Face Nelson and members of the Barker–Karpis gang were also rumored visitors. However much of this activity would have taken place in the 1920s, suggesting that an earlier roadhouse preceded Lynch's Chicken Shack. Since the businesses at the site deliberately wished to avoid official attention, their exact history, clientele, and services resist substantiation. Even the basic timeline is murky: the Lynch brothers were natives of Oak Park and sources generally agree that their Chicken Shack opened in 1929, even though the 1930 United States census records Gerald Lynch living in Detroit with his Michigan-born wife and son.

Prohibition ended in April 1933 and henceforward the Log Cabin could sell alcohol legally. Lynch sold the business in 1938, and when it changed hands again in 1946 it was renamed the Club Tara Hideaway. These first three sets of owners lived in the building's back room. A new owner purchased the business in 1966, shortening the name to Club Tara, expanding the menu, and converting the back room to additional dining space. It changed hands several times in the mid-1990s, but since 1997 it has been operated by Phil Barbatsis as Phil's Tara Hideaway. Under Barbatsis and chef Brad Nordeen, the restaurant has specialized in locally sourced Greek and Mediterranean cuisine.

== See also ==
- National Register of Historic Places listings in Washington County, Minnesota
