= Stillwater Bridge (St. Croix River) =

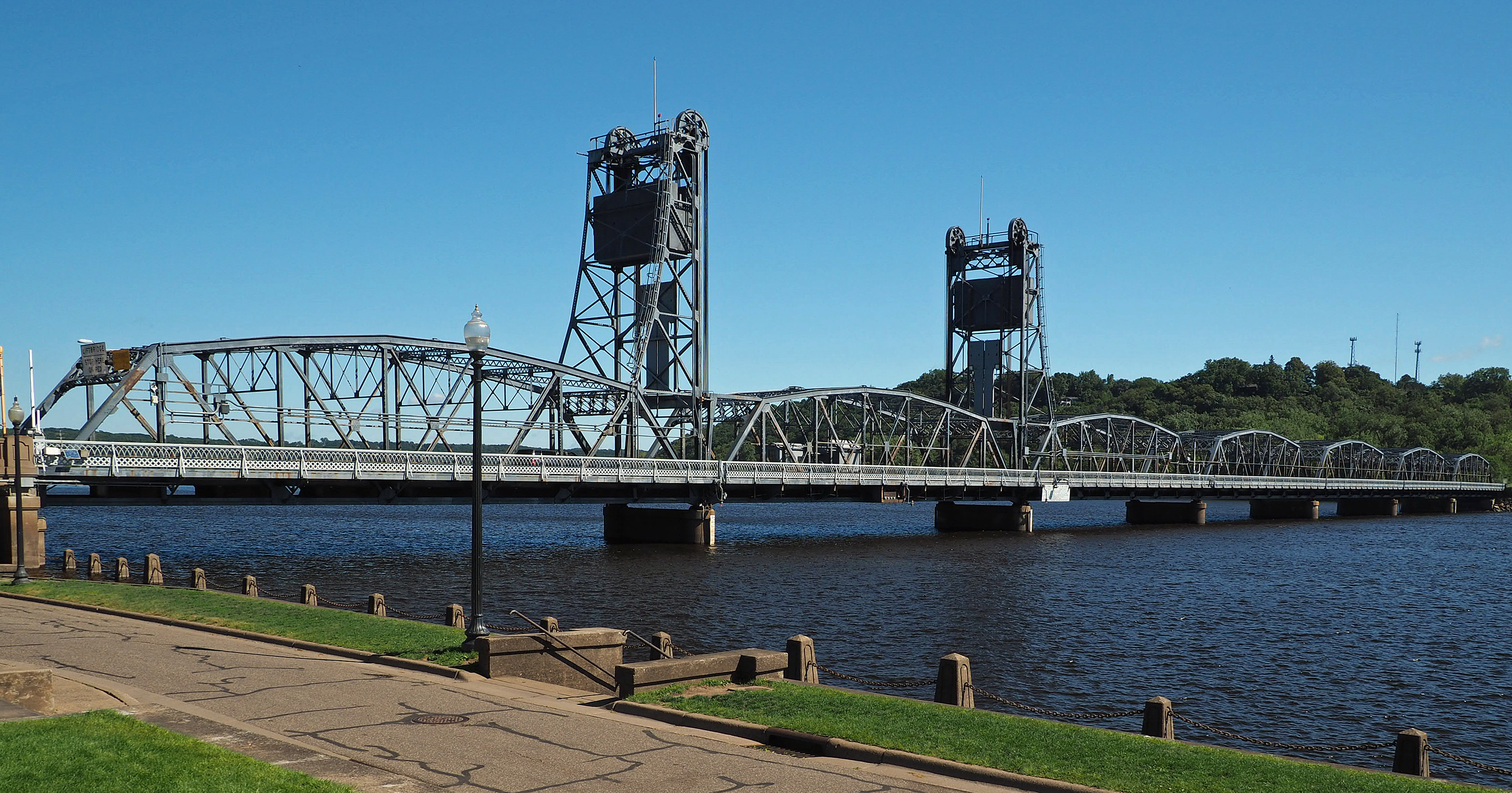
- The Stillwater Bridge from the southwest
- Coordinates: 45°03′23″N 92°48′12″W
- Carries: Bicycle and pedestrian traffic
- Crosses: St. Croix River
- Locale: Stillwater, Minnesota
- Maintained by: Minnesota Department of Transportation
- ID number: 4654 (Minnesota), M-61 (Wisconsin)

Characteristics
- Design: Vertical-lift bridge
- Total length: 1,050 feet (320 m)
- Width: 23 feet (7.0 m)
- Longest span: 140 feet (43 m)

History
- Opened: 1931
- Closed: August 2, 2017

Statistics
- Daily traffic: 18,000
- Stillwater Bridge
- U.S. National Register of Historic Places
- Location within Minnesota
- Coordinates: 45°3′23″N 92°48′12″W
- Area: Less than 1 acre (0.40 ha)
- Built: 1931
- Built by: American Bridge Company, Peppard and Fulton
- Architects: Ash, Howard, Needles, and Tammen; Minnesota Department of Highways
- NRHP reference No.: 89000445
- Added to NRHP: May 25, 1989

The Stillwater Bridge (alternatively known as the Stillwater Lift Bridge, St. Croix River Bridge at Stillwater, Mn/DOT Bridge #4654, and Wis/DOT Bridge #M-61) is a vertical-lift bridge crossing the St. Croix River between Stillwater, Minnesota, and Houlton, Wisconsin, United States. It formerly connected Minnesota State Highway 36 and Wisconsin Highway 64. Around 18,000 vehicles crossed the bridge daily. The new St. Croix Crossing bridge crossing the St. Croix river valley to the south of Stillwater replaced its purpose, having opened to highway traffic on August 2, 2017, leaving the Stillwater Lift Bridge to be preserved and to be converted to bicycle/pedestrian use.

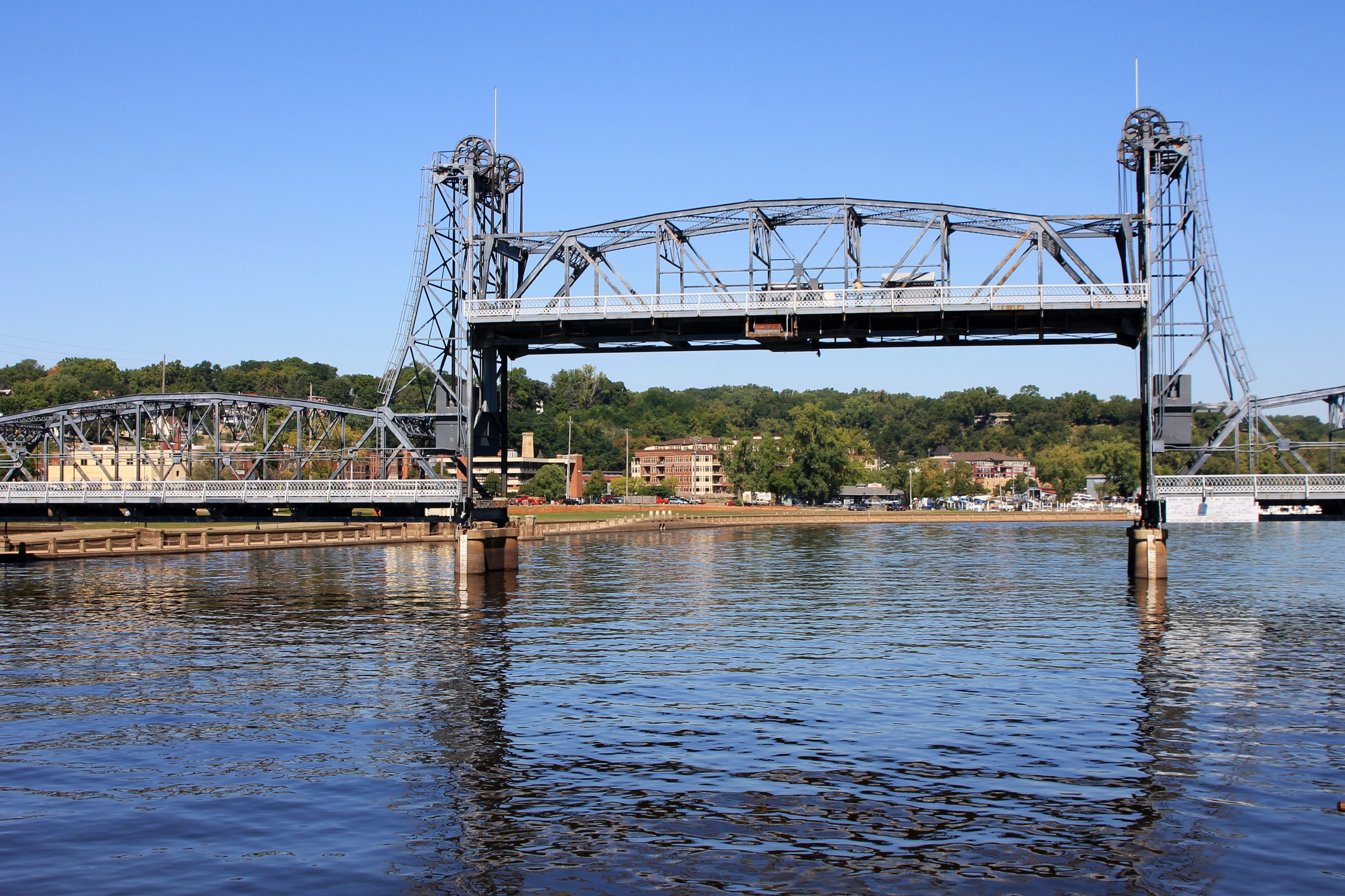
The bridge in 2013 with its lift span raised

The bridge was listed on the National Register of Historic Places in 1989 for having state-level significance in the theme of engineering. It was nominated for being a rare surviving example of a vertical-lift highway bridge based on the designs pioneered by Waddell & Harrington. The Stillwater Lift Bridge was one of two bridges on the St. Croix River between the Interstate 94 bridge in Hudson, Wisconsin, and the U.S. Highway 8 bridge in Taylors Falls, Minnesota, providing a popular and useful alternative to those crossings. (The other bridge is the Highway 243 bridge at Osceola, Wisconsin.)

The bridge consists of seven fixed steel truss spans 1,050 feet (320 m) long in total, including a vertically lifting span 140 feet (43 m) long. It is 23 feet (7.0 m) wide, allowing one lane of traffic in each direction. The lifting span is a Waddell & Harrington type, one of six built in Minnesota and Wisconsin and one of three still remaining today. Built in 1931 to replace a swing bridge from 1910, it was the last bridge of this design to be built in the area. Minnesota and Wisconsin evenly split the $460,174 cost of the bridge.

== History ==
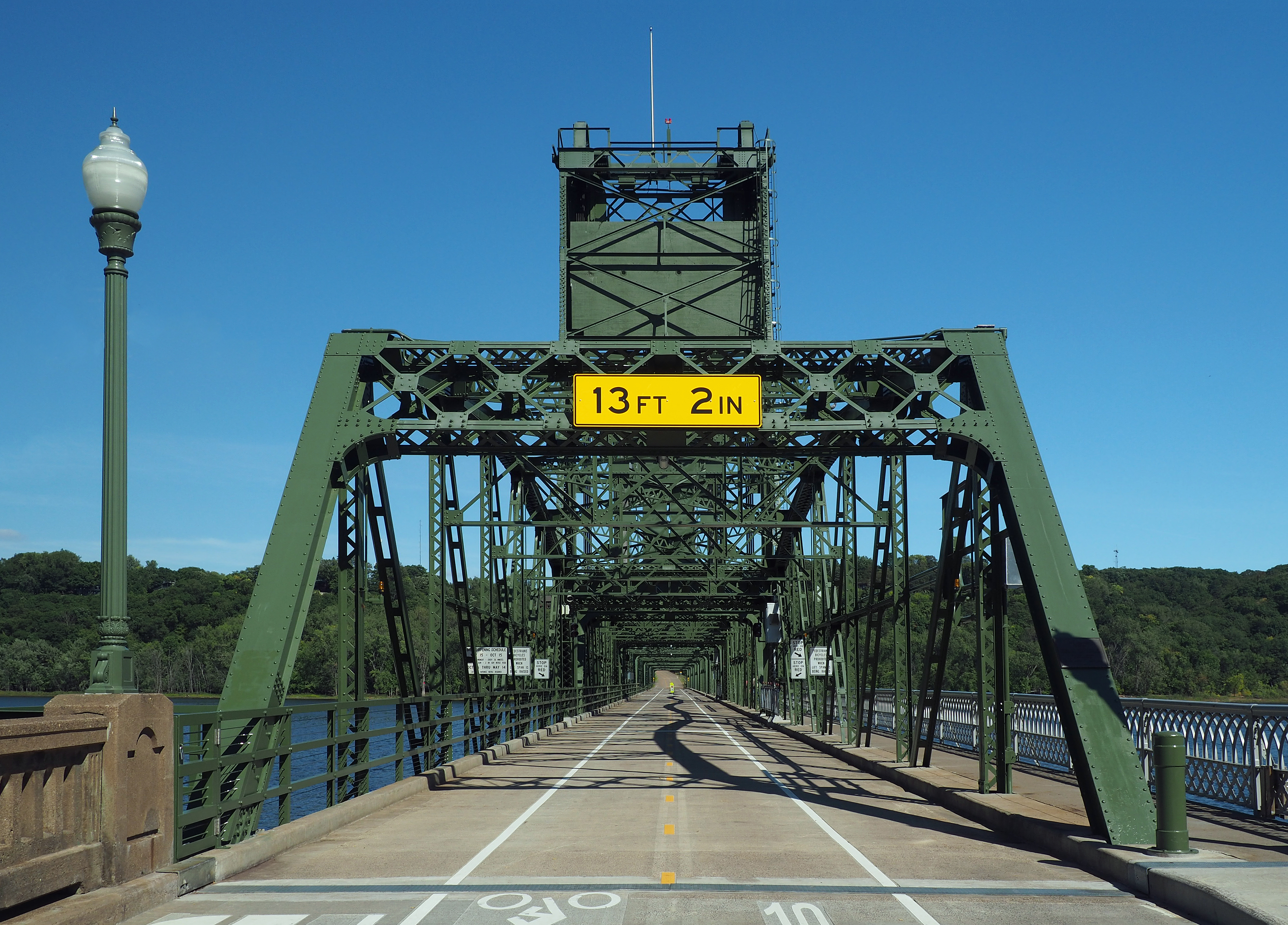
Roadway view of the bridge after its pedestrianization

Beginning August 1, 2005, the Minnesota Department of Transportation closed the bridge to perform substantial repairs at a cost of $5 million provided by Congress. The project included renovating the tender's house so that it would conform to modern safety standards while maintaining historical preservation. On November 11, 2005, the bridge re-opened to traffic after the bridge deck had been replaced.

In July 2008 a truck carrying lumber exceeded the height clearance of the bridge and struck its structure as it tried to cross. The bridge had to be closed for repairs, and reopened on August 2, 2008. In 2012 the bridge was closed again for a construction project to make more steel repairs.

The St. Croix River Crossing Project of MnDOT called for the construction of a brand new, four-lane bridge less than a mile downriver and the conversion of the Stillwater Bridge to pedestrian and bicycle use. Originally, construction of this bridge was planned to start in 2024, but legislation was passed requiring the Department of Transportation to address aging bridges by 2018, and the start date was moved up to 2013. However, on March 11, 2010, a federal judge ruled that the government had violated its rules in approving the bridge design, which sent the process back to an earlier stage.

In 2009 Minneapolis architectural model builder Feyereisen Studios completed a model of the Stillwater Lift Bridge. The idea to build a physical model of the Stillwater Lift Bridge was undertaken in an effort to enlist the assistance of the disabled community, so as to make it easier for everyone to visualize and clearly understand the project. Unlike most architectural models, the model of the Stillwater Lift Bridge was designed so that the visually impaired could explore it by sense of touch. The architectural model builders enlisted the help of the visually impaired while creating the model, and utilized various unconventional materials, including magnets to make breakaway lamp posts, sandpaper to indicate detectable warnings, raised crosswalk markings to indicate the crosswalk, and fuzzy grass. Everything on the model was labeled with both large text and Braille to enable people with low vision to understand the plans for the bridge.

== Shortcomings ==
Bridge sections under renovation in 2018

Because the bridge feeds directly into downtown Stillwater on the Minnesota side, gridlock often occurred and traffic could back up on Minnesota State Highway 36 for many miles, especially on weekends and during the summer. The effect was made worse whenever the bridge was raised. The bridge's mechanisms had remained essentially unaltered since its opening in 1931 and on occasion became stuck.

In addition, the bridge had been deemed "structurally deficient" by inspectors, receiving a sufficiency rating of 32.8 on a 100-point scale, as of June 23, 2008. Because of the bridge's design, it was considered "fracture critical"; there was no built-in redundancy to prevent the entire structure from collapsing if one component fails. In comparison, the I-35W Mississippi River bridge, another fracture-critical bridge that collapsed on August 1, 2007, received a sufficiency rating of 50. The bridge had a height restriction of 13 feet 2 inches (4.01 m) and a weight restriction of 40 tons.

== Gallery ==
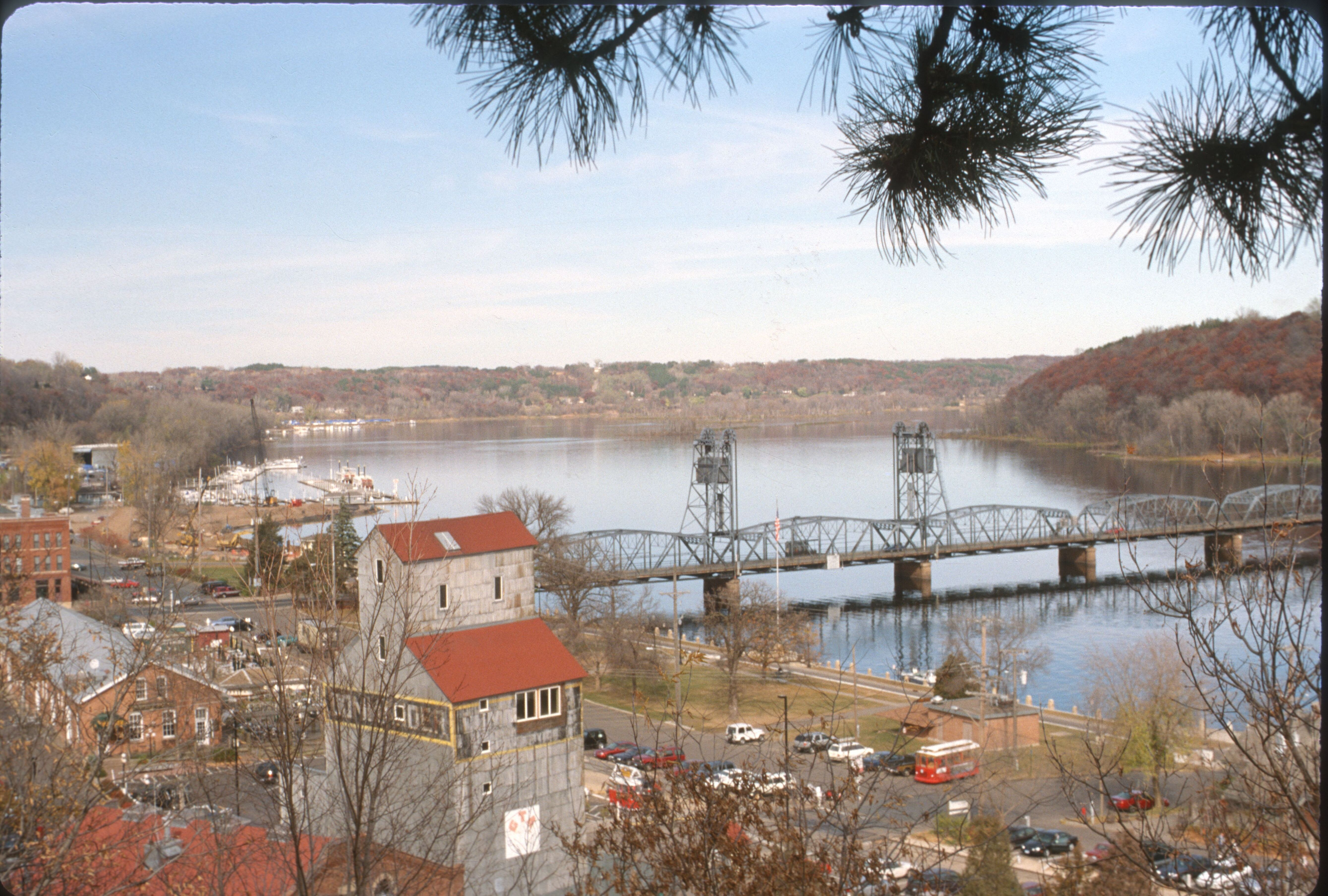
Birdseye view of the Stillwater Lift Bridge and the Commander Building, Stillwater, Minnesota

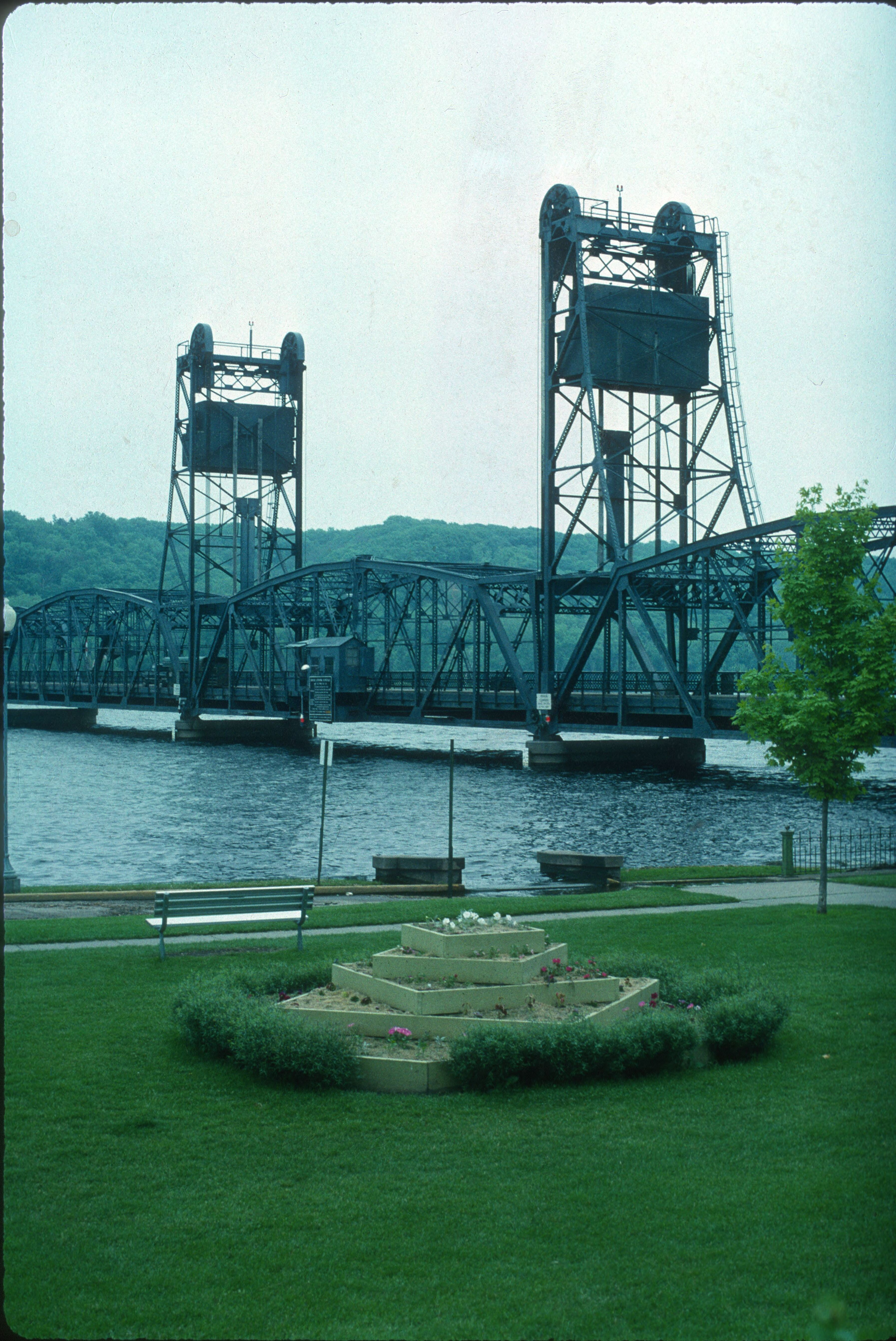
The fountain in Lowell Park near the Stillwater Lift Bridge in Stillwater, Minnesota

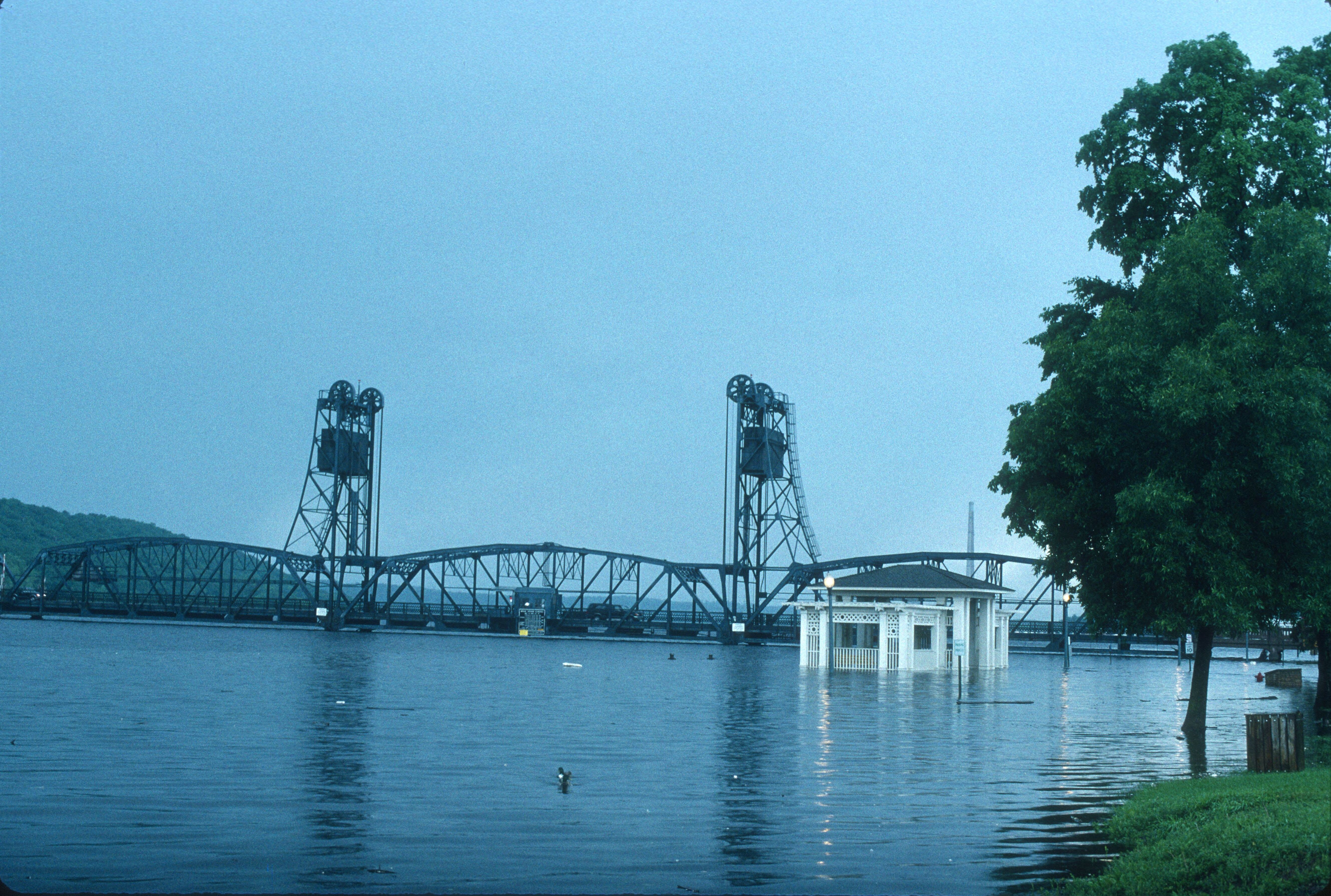
Stillwater Liftbridge and Lowell Park Gazebo Flooding

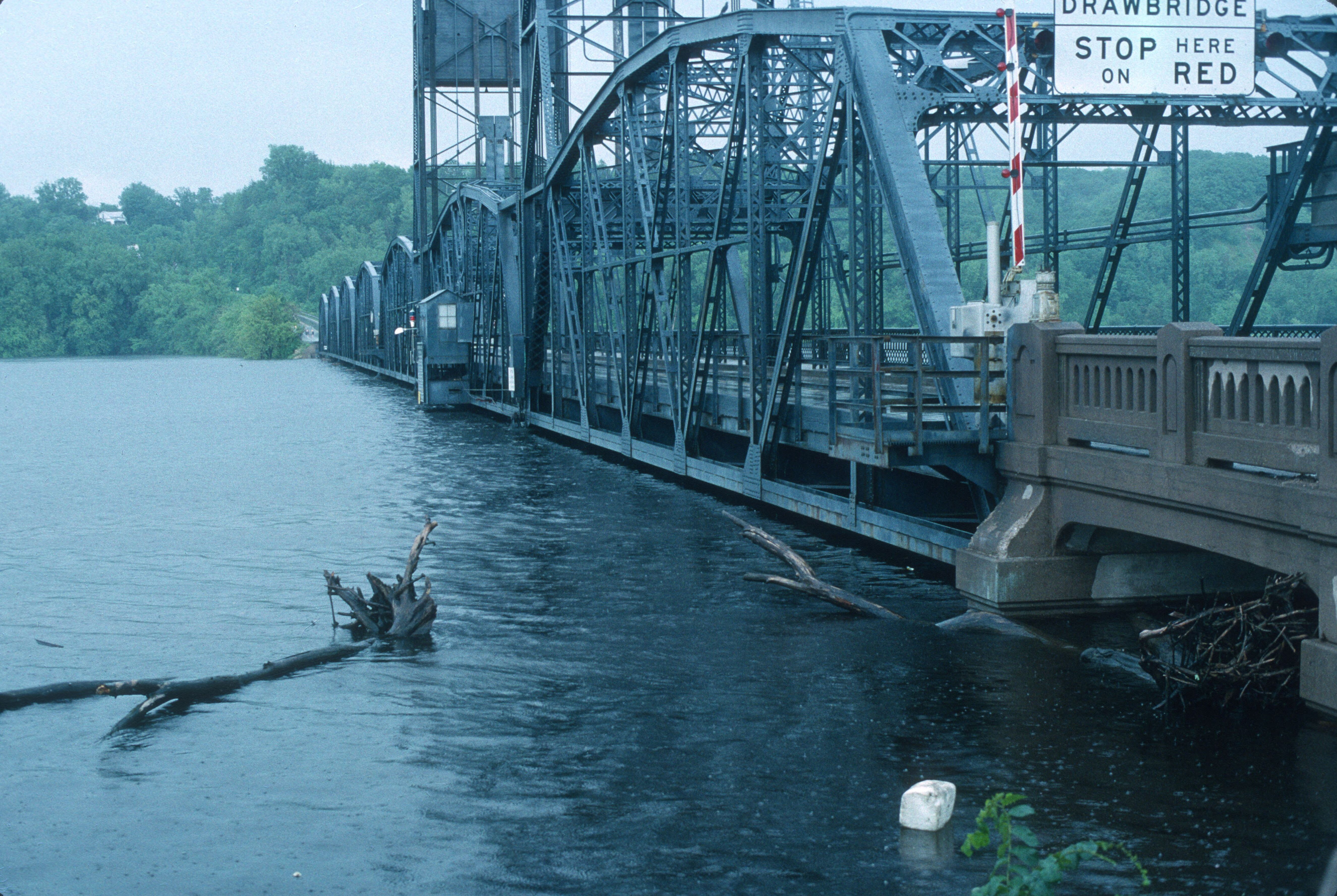
Flooding up to the deck of the Stillwater Lift Bridge in Stillwater, Minnesota

== See also ==
- Aerial Lift Bridge – another lift bridge in Duluth, Minnesota
- List of bridges on the National Register of Historic Places in Minnesota
- National Register of Historic Places listings in Washington County, Minnesota
- St. Croix Crossing - the new bridge, opened in 2017
