= C.A.P. Turner =

American structural engineer

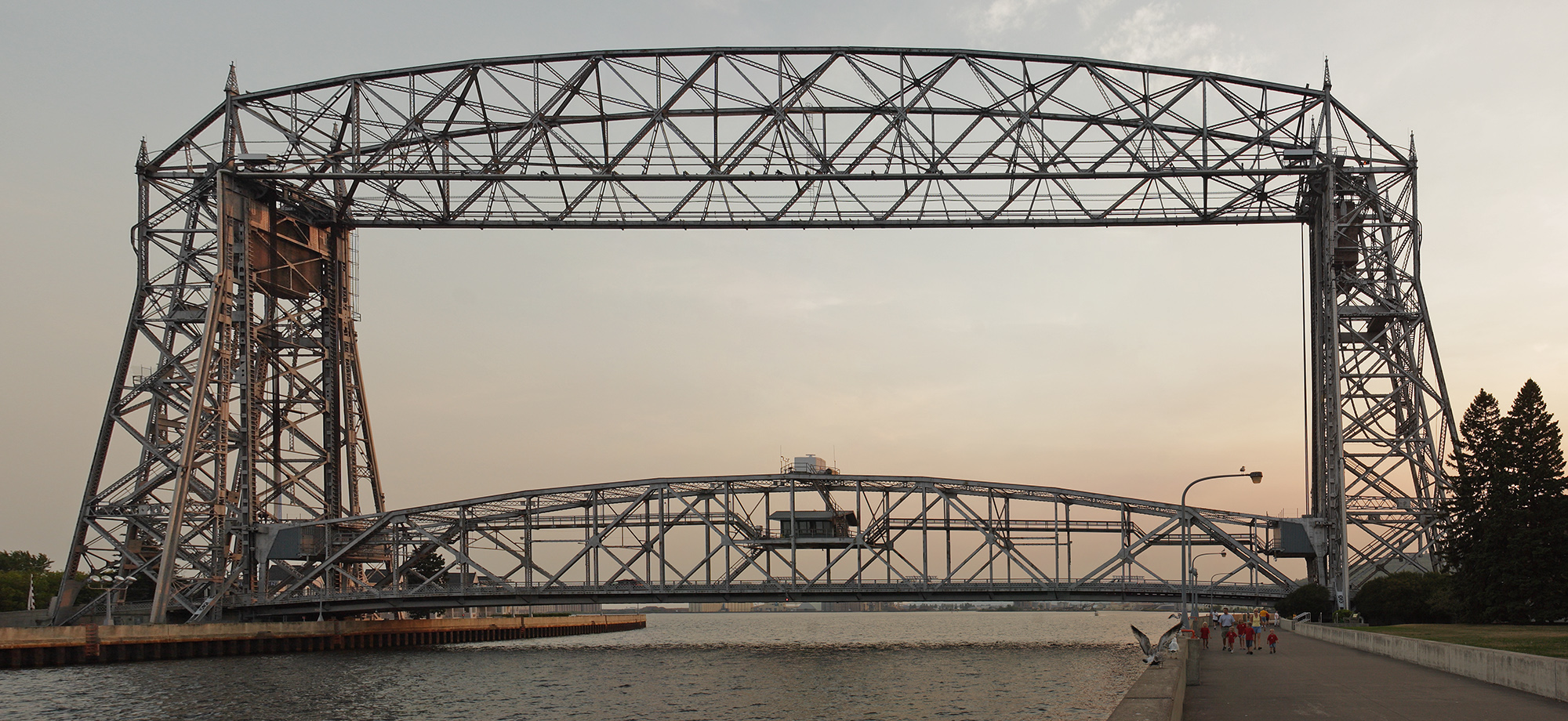
The Duluth Aerial Lift Bridge

Claude Allen Porter Turner (July 4, 1869 – January 10, 1955) was an American structural engineer who designed a number of buildings and bridges, particularly in the midwestern U.S. states of Iowa, Minnesota, and Wisconsin.

Turner was born in Lincoln, Rhode Island, and attended Lehigh University's school of engineering in Bethlehem, Pennsylvania, graduating in 1890. He worked for several companies in the eastern United States before moving to Minneapolis, Minnesota, in 1897. He formed his own company in 1901 and received a patent in 1908 for an innovative flat-slab support system, known as the Turner System or the Spiral Mushroom System, using reinforced concrete, although this patent was invalidated in 1915 and 1916 in favor of similar patents filed by American engineer O.W. Norcross. Turner's patent, however, was licensed to overseas designers including Hugh Ralston Crawford in Australia.

Turner would eventually receive 30 patents related to reinforced concrete. He died in Columbus, Ohio, in 1955.

Notable designs by Turner include:

- the Marshall Building (a.k.a. Hoffman Building) in Milwaukee, Wisconsin, 1906 (a National Historic Civil Engineering Landmark)
- the Lindeke-Warner Building, St. Paul, Minnesota (first American building to use the Turner System), 1909
- the 2,730 ft Soo Line High Bridge (North of Stillwater, Minnesota, on the St. Croix River), 1911
- the Mendota Bridge in the Twin Cities, 1926
- re-engineering the Aerial Lift Bridge in Duluth, Minnesota, from a transporter bridge into a lift bridge, 1929
- the Liberty Memorial Bridge between Bismarck and Mandan, North Dakota
