= Soo Line High Bridge =

- U.S. National Register of Historic Places
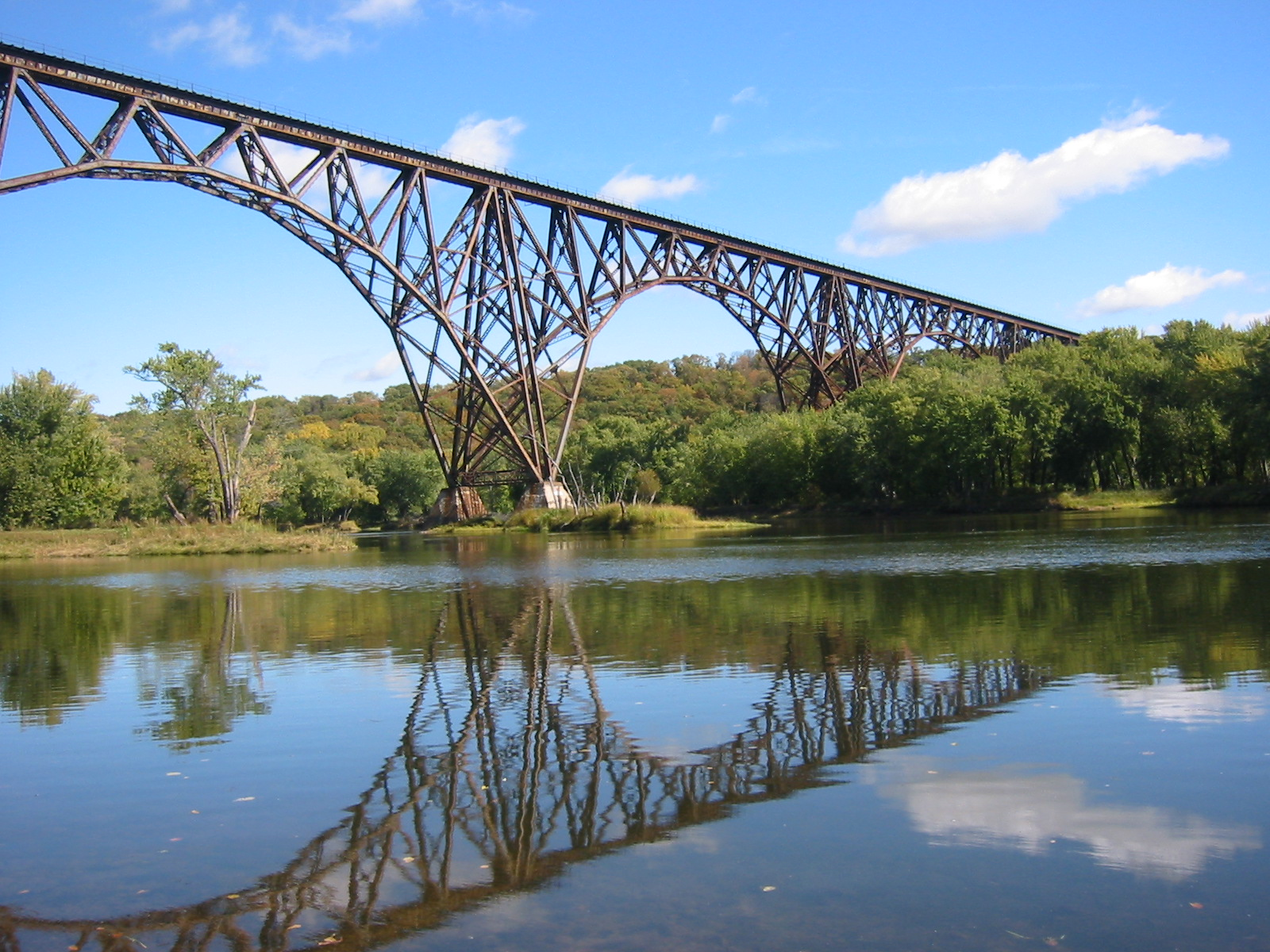
- The Soo Line High Bridge from the southwest

- Location within Wisconsin Location within the United States
- Nearest city: Somerset, Wisconsin
- Coordinates: 45°7′23″N 92°44′39″W
- Built: 1910–11
- Built by: American Bridge Company
- Architect: C.A.P. Turner
- MPS: Washington County MRA (AD)
- NRHP reference No.: 77000056
- Added to NRHP: August 22, 1977

The Soo Line High Bridge, also known as the Arcola High Bridge, is a steel deck arch bridge over the St. Croix River between Stillwater, Minnesota and Somerset, Wisconsin, United States. It was designed by structural engineer C.A.P. Turner and built by the American Bridge Company from 1910 to 1911. The bridge was listed on the National Register of Historic Places in 1977 for its national significance in the themes of engineering and transportation. It was nominated for its exceptional dimensions, beauty, innovative engineering techniques, and importance to transportation between Minnesota and Wisconsin.

== History ==
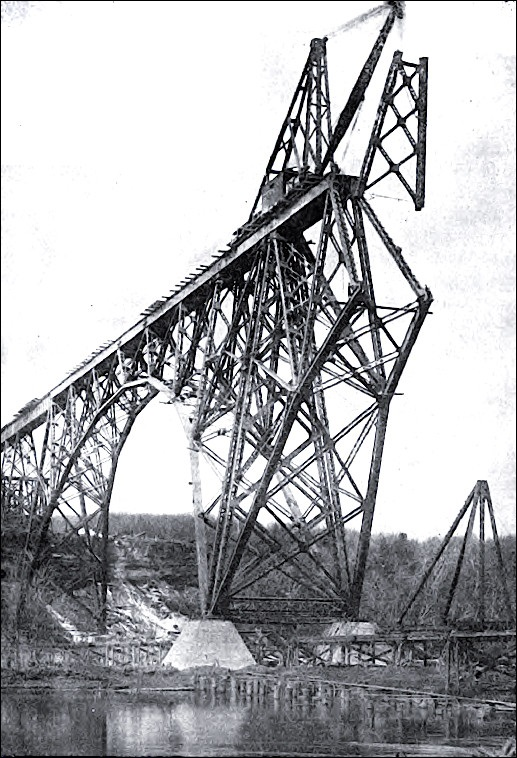
The Soo Line High Bridge under construction

The bridge was the second bridge on a Wisconsin Central Railway line that connected Chippewa Falls, Wisconsin, with Minneapolis, Minnesota. The line was originally built in 1884. The crossing of the St. Croix River was difficult for the railway, since the original bridge across the river was very low and trains had to contend with steep grades on both sides of the river. This made it necessary to use helper engines and to make trains shorter. In 1909 the Wisconsin Central Railway built a higher bridge over the river. The bridge is 184 feet (56 m) above the river and 2,682 feet (817 m) long, with five steel arches towering above the river.

The Wisconsin Central Railway was leased by the Minneapolis, St. Paul and Sault Ste. Marie Railway in 1909. In 1961 the Minneapolis, St. Paul and Sault Ste. Marie Railway, Wisconsin Central Railway and the Duluth, South Shore and Atlantic Railway merged to form the Soo Line Railroad. After the Soo Line Railroad acquired the Chicago, Milwaukee, St. Paul and Pacific Railroad, it shifted Chicago–Minneapolis traffic to that railroad's superior mainline. In 1987 the bridge and much of the Soo Line's track in Wisconsin became part of the new Wisconsin Central Ltd. The Wisconsin Central was acquired by Canadian National Railway on January 30, 2001.

== See also ==
- List of bridges on the National Register of Historic Places in Minnesota
- List of bridges on the National Register of Historic Places in Wisconsin
- National Register of Historic Places listings in St. Croix County, Wisconsin
- National Register of Historic Places listings in Washington County, Minnesota
