= Minnesota State Highway 36 =

State highway in Minnesota

Trunk Highway 36
- MN 36 highlighted in red

Route information
- Maintained by MnDOT
- Length: 21.718 mi (34.952 km)
- Existed: 1933–present

Major junctions
- West end: I-35W at Roseville
- MN 51 at Roseville; I-35E / US 10 at Little Canada; US 61 at Maplewood; MN 120 at North St. Paul–Oakdale; I-694 at Oakdale–Pine Springs; MN 95 at Oak Park Heights
- East end: WIS 64 at Oak Park Heights

Location
- Country: United States
- State: Minnesota
- Counties: Ramsey, Washington

Highway system
- Minnesota Trunk Highway System; Interstate; US; State; Legislative; Scenic
← I-35W	→ MN 37

Minnesota State Highway 36 (MN 36) is a 21.718-mile-long (34.952 km) highway in the U.S. state of Minnesota, which runs from its interchange with Interstate 35W (I-35W) in Roseville and continues east to its eastern terminus at the Wisconsin state line (near Stillwater), where it becomes Wisconsin Highway 64 (WIS 64) upon crossing the St. Croix River at the St. Croix Crossing bridge. MN 36 is a major freeway in suburban Minneapolis–Saint Paul from its western terminus to its intersection with MN 120, at which point it becomes an at-grade expressway.

Historically, MN 36 traveled on a north-south course through Minneapolis before heading east toward Stillwater. Since its terminus moved to I-35W in 1980, growth and development has seen the highway becoming more of a freeway, with controlled intersections being rebuilt as grade-separated interchanges.

Washington County is leading a project to replace the controlled intersection at MN 36 and County State-Aid Highway 17 (CSAH 17, Lake Elmo Avenue) in Grant and Lake Elmo. Final design has been completed and construction is set to start in 2026. The county has also requested $3 million in state funding for to design an interchange at the intersection of MN 36 and MN 120.

== Route description ==
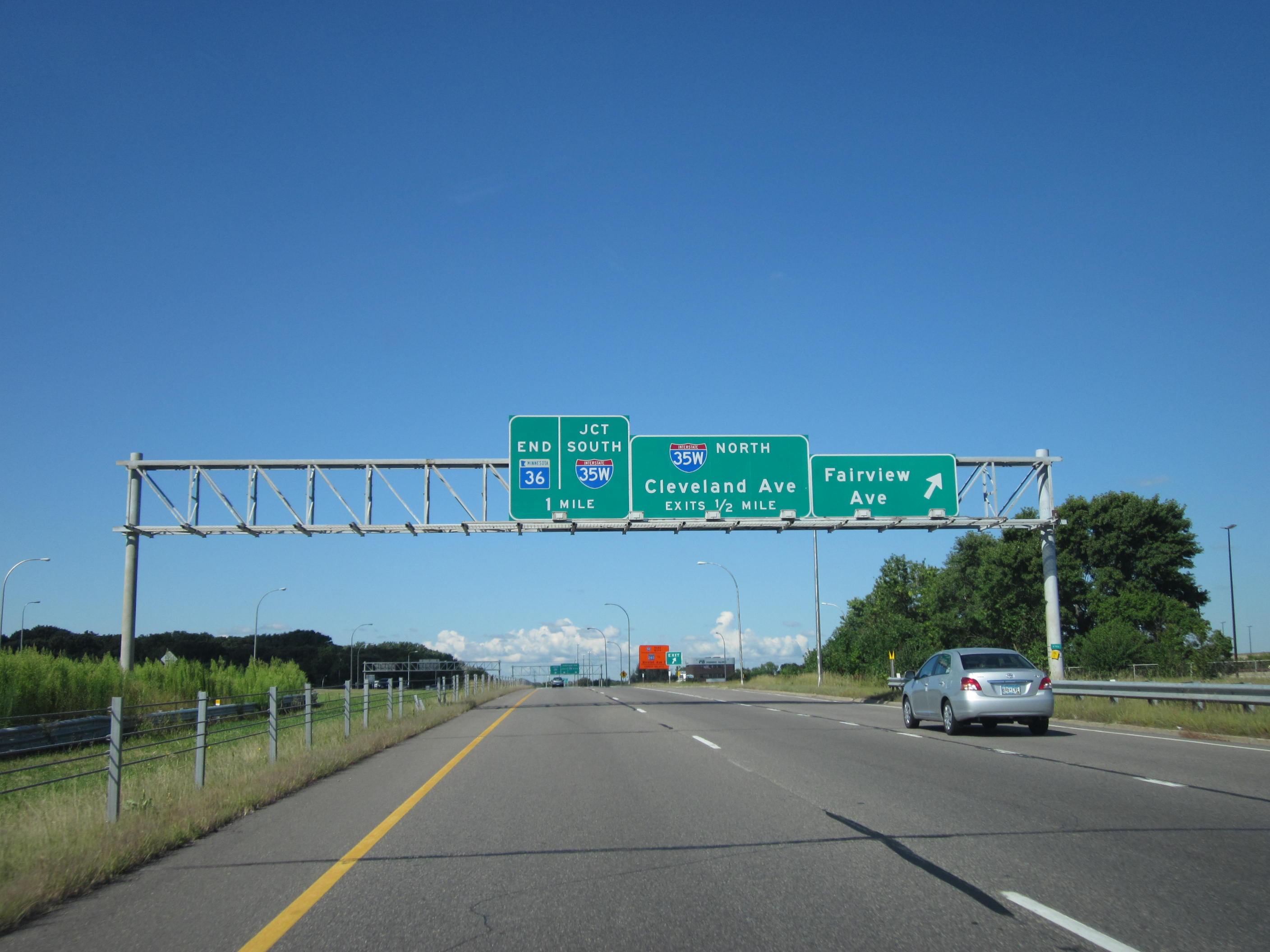
Shortly before meeting I-35W

MN 36 serves as an east–west highway between the cities of Roseville, Little Canada, Maplewood, North St. Paul, Oakdale, Oak Park Heights, and Stillwater. MN 36 is a controlled-access freeway from its interchange with I-35W in Roseville eastward to MN 120 in North St. Paul and Oakdale. Near Rosedale Center, MN 36 has a junction with MN 51 (Snelling Avenue). It then meets County Road 42 (CR 42, Rice Street) at an offset single-point urban interchange. The highway intersects I-35E in Little Canada. It straddles the border with and crosses into Maplewood, where it meets U.S. Highway 61 (US 61). The portion of MN 36 in North St. Paul is known as the Officer Richard Crittenden, Sr. Memorial Highway.

The freeway section ends at a signal-controlled intersection with MN 120. MN 36 then becomes an at-grade expressway. It proceeds through Oakdale before an interchange with I-694 in Pine Springs. For about four miles (6.4 km) outside of the I-494/I-694 loop, the expressway section of MN 36 has a speed limit of 65 miles per hour (105 km/h). It passes the cities of Grant and Lake Elmo before reaching Stillwater and Oak Park Heights. MN 36 crosses the St. Croix River via the St. Croix Crossing bridge and becomes WIS 64 upon crossing the state line into Wisconsin.

== History ==
MN 36 was authorized in 1933. Legally, it is defined as Legislative Route 118. The route is not marked with this number. At this time, MN 36 was significantly longer, running between Richfield and a point west of Stillwater. The route was a paved road from its junction with MN 5 northward to the Minneapolis city limits. It was known as Cedar Avenue for most of its course in Minneapolis. It then turned to the east on a bituminous surface until it reached US 61, at which point it became a gravel road to its terminus with US 212 near Stillwater. By 1941, the entire highway was paved with at least bitumen. Excluding within Minneapolis and the portion between MN 49 and US 61, the entirety of the route was a four-lane divided highway.

MN 36 did not originally reach the Wisconsin state line at the St. Croix River. Part of old MN 212 in Oak Park Heights and Stillwater was renumbered as MN 36 in 1960. By 1962, MN 36 extended past MN 5 and continued through Bloomington, ending at a junction with MN 13 in Eagan. The portion of MN 36 south of MN 62 was redesignated as a part of MN 77 in 1980. The former highway between MN 62 and I-35W reverted to county control as CR 152 (Cedar Avenue).

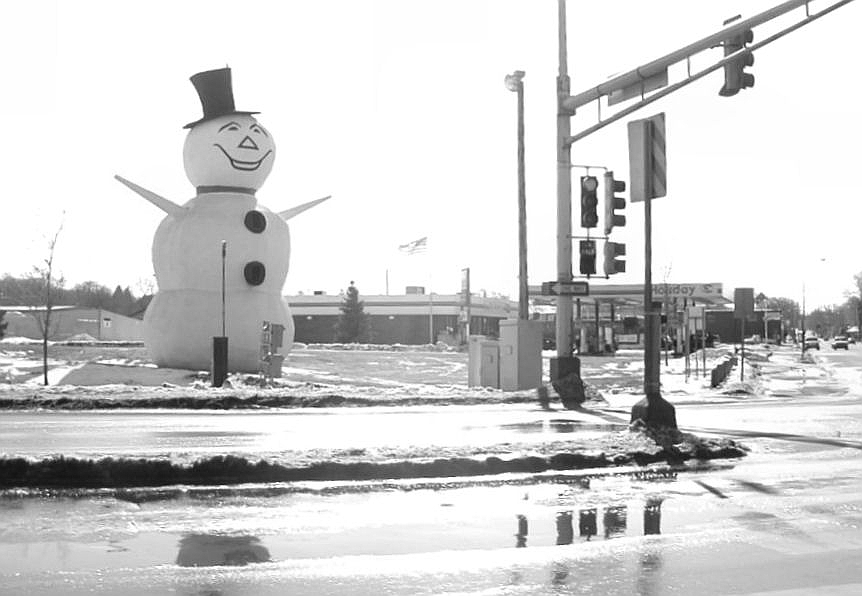
The intersection of MN 36 and Margaret Street at North St. Paul in February 2003

The section of MN 36 in North St. Paul was closed in 2007 from April to September. The highway was rebuilt to freeway standards during this time between White Bear Avenue in Maplewood and MN 120 (Century Avenue) in North St. Paul. The changes included turning the intersection with CR 68 (McKnight Road) into a grade-separated interchange and building an overpass at Margaret Street, removing its access to MN 36. The full closure in 2007 allowed the project to be completed more quickly and at a lower cost than a staged reconstruction. It also increased safety for construction workers. The MN 36 reconstruction project in North St. Paul was completed in 2008. The budget of the project was $24 million.

In 2010, the existing diamond interchange at CR 49 (Rice Street) in Roseville was replaced with an offset single-point urban interchange with an estimated cost of $27 million. This was intended to reduce safety and capacity issues. The project also included the widening of Rice Street and the addition of bike lanes and sidewalks. Construction ended in late 2011. Construction of a new tight diamond interchange at English Street started in 2013 to replace an existing controlled intersection. A trail bridge was also built for the Bruce Vento Regional Trail; the total cost of the project was $17.3 million. An interchange was constructed in 2014 at MN 36 and CSAH 29 (Hilton Trail) in Pine Springs. The project also included two roundabouts on Hilton Trail on either side of the highway, one at 60th Street North and another at an extension of Viking Drive.

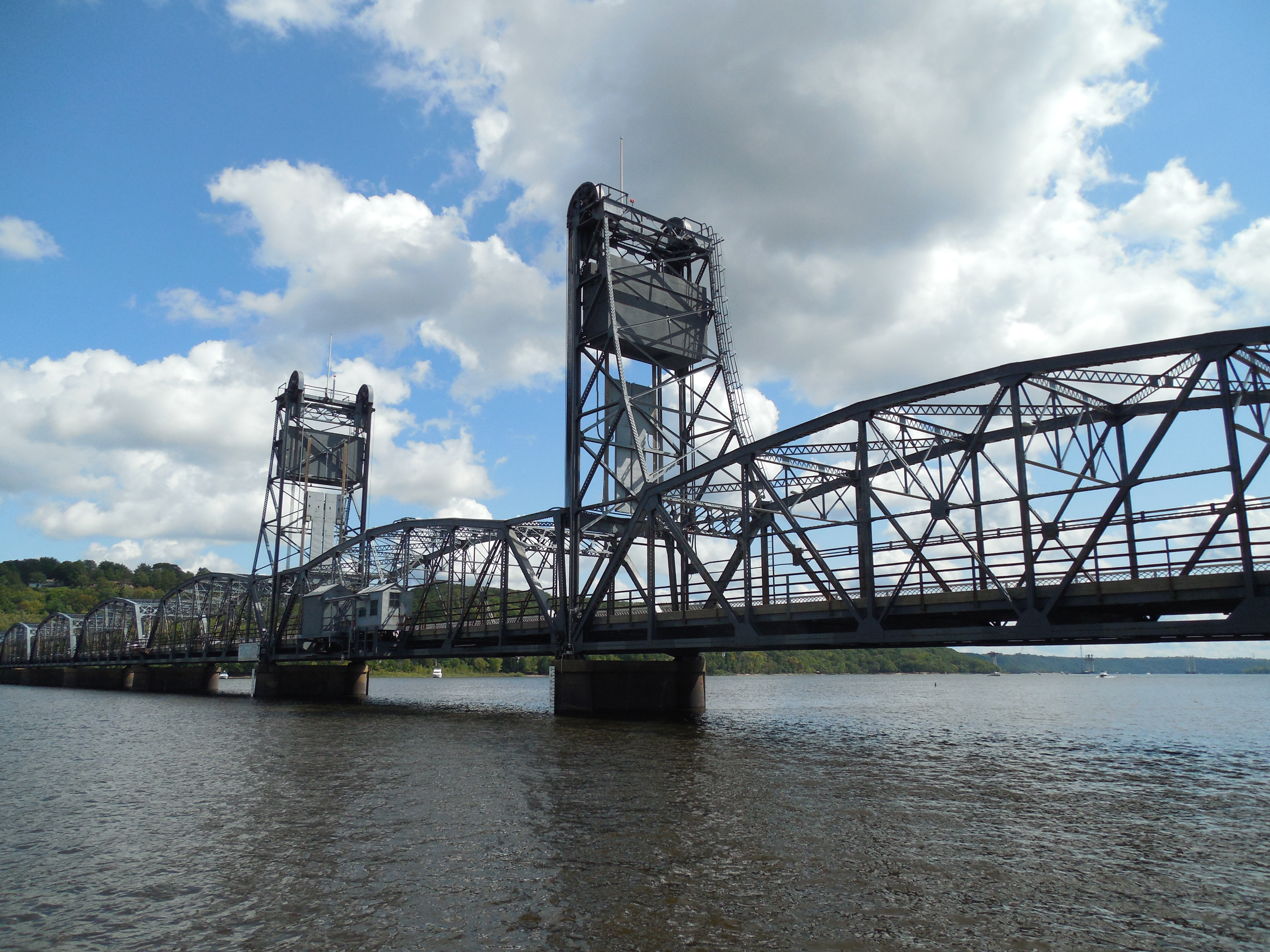
The Stillwater Lift Bridge formerly used by MN 36

The Minnesota Legislature passed a bill in 2014 designating MN 36 in North St. Paul as the Officer Richard Crittenden Sr. Memorial Highway, honoring a North St. Paul officer killed in the line of duty in 2009. Prior to August 2017, upon reaching the St. Croix River, MN 36 merged with, and ran concurrently with MN 95 north into downtown Stillwater. At Chestnut St., MN 36 turned east and crossed the St. Croix River on the historic Stillwater Lift Bridge. The Stillwater Bridge had to be closed frequently for repairs, and at over 80 years old was deemed obsolete and vulnerable to failure.

On August 2, 2017, the new St. Croix Crossing bridge opened and MN 36 now uses this bridge to cross into Wisconsin, eliminating its concurrency with MN 95. The bridge was designed around concerns for the environment and scenery. For example, the interchange with MN 95 was routed around a bald eagle nest. The St. Croix Crossing bridge uses an uncommon extradosed design with shorter towers than a suspension bridge that keeps the height lower than the river bluffs. Upon completion, it was the longest extradosed bridge in the United States. Since its construction, the bridge has led to a significant uptick in the number of vehicles traveling on MN 36.

In 2019, construction began on a $22 million interchange at MN 36 and CSAH 13 (Hadley Avenue) in Oakdale, partially as a result of high crash rates. As a part of the project, one roundabout was constructed on each side of the overpass, with one more being built at 56th Street. Construction finished in 2020. A partial cloverleaf interchange was constructed in 2021 at the intersection of MN 36 and CSAH 15 north (Manning Avenue) just west of Stillwater. The project had a budget of $32 million.

== Future ==
Washington County is leading a redesign of the MN 36/CSAH 17 (Lake Elmo Avenue) intersection in the cities of Grant and Lake Elmo in order to increase safety, reduce congestion, and improve accessibility for active transportation. Between 2014 and 2024, 170 crashes have occurred at the intersection. The total cost of the project is estimated to be $40 million, with $25 million coming from federal and state sources. The recommended final layout is an overpass with buttonhook ramps and also includes closing access at Keats Avenue. Construction is slated to start in the spring of 2026, ending in fall of 2027.

As of April 2025, Washington County is requesting $3 million from state legislature to design a grade-separated interchange for the existing intersection at MN 36 and MN 120 (HF 1599 / SF 959). Other than the intersection with Lake Elmo Avenue, it is the only controlled intersection west of CSAH 5 north/CSAH 15 south (Stillwater Boulevard). It has also been identified by the Minnesota Department of Transportation (MnDOT) as having the fourth-highest crash cost of any Minnesota state highway, with an average of 25 reported crashes per year. The project would also include pedestrian and bicycle considerations, as well as connections to the Gateway State Trail.

== Major intersections ==
County	Location	mi	km	Exit	Destinations	Notes
Ramsey	Roseville	0.000	0.000		I-35W south	Western terminus; west end of freeway; I-35W exit 22B
Ramsey	Roseville	0.163– 0.427	0.262– 0.687	0A	Cleveland Avenue south (CR 46)	Parclo interchange
Ramsey	Roseville	0.480	0.772	0B	I-35W north	Westbound exit and eastbound entrance; I-35W exit 22B
Ramsey	Roseville	0.785– 0.825	1.263– 1.328	0C	Fairview Avenue (CR 48)	
Ramsey	Roseville	1.295	2.084	1A/B	MN 51 (Snelling Avenue)	
Ramsey	Roseville	1.770	2.849	1C	Hamline Avenue (CR 50)	Right-in/right-out interchange
Ramsey	Roseville	2.272	3.656	2	Lexington Avenue (CR 51)	
Ramsey	Roseville	3.265	5.255	3	Dale Street (CR 53)	
Ramsey	Little Canada	4.275	6.880	4	CR 49 (Rice Street)	Offset single-point urban interchange; former MN 49
Ramsey	Little Canada	5.121	8.241	5A/B	I-35E / US 10 east – St. Paul	Cloverleaf interchange; I-35E exit 111
Ramsey	Little Canada	5.769	9.284	5C	Edgerton Street (CR 58)	
Ramsey	Maplewood	6.844	11.014		US 61	Cloverleaf interchange; westbound entrance includes bus entryway from Keller Parkway
Ramsey	Maplewood	7.321	11.782		English Street	
Ramsey	Maplewood	8.445– 8.479	13.591– 13.646		White Bear Avenue (CR 65)	
Ramsey	North St. Paul	9.296	14.960		McKnight Road (CR 68)	
Ramsey	North St. Paul	9.979	16.060		Margaret Street	Westbound exit only
Ramsey–Washington county line	North St. Paul–Oakdale line	10.465	16.842		MN 120 (Century Avenue)	At-grade intersection; eastern end of freeway
Washington	Oakdale	11.271	18.139		CSAH 13 (Hadley Avenue)	Dumbbell interchange
Washington	Oakdale–Pine Springs line	11.776– 11.793	18.952– 18.979		I-694	Cloverleaf interchange; I-694 exit 52
Washington	Pine Springs	12.303	19.800		CSAH 29 (Hilton Trail)	Interchange
Washington	Grant	15.772	25.383		CSAH 17 (Lake Elmo Avenue)	At-grade intersection; future interchange
Washington	Grant	16.775	26.997		CSAH 15 north (Manning Avenue)	Western end of CSAH 15 overlap; interchange
Washington	Oak Park Heights	17.577	28.287		CSAH 5 north / CSAH 15 south (Stillwater Boulevard)	Eastern end of CSAH 15 overlap; formerly MN 5; interchange
Washington	Oak Park Heights	20.490	32.975		MN 95 – Stillwater, Bayport	
St. Croix River		21.718	34.952	St. Croix Crossing; Minnesota–Wisconsin line		
St. Croix River		21.718	34.952		WIS 64 east	Freeway continues into Wisconsin
1.000 mi = 1.609 km; 1.000 km = 0.621 mi: Concurrency terminus; Incomplete access
