= Saint Croix National Scenic Riverway =

250 miles of riverways in Wisconsin (US) managed by the National Park Service

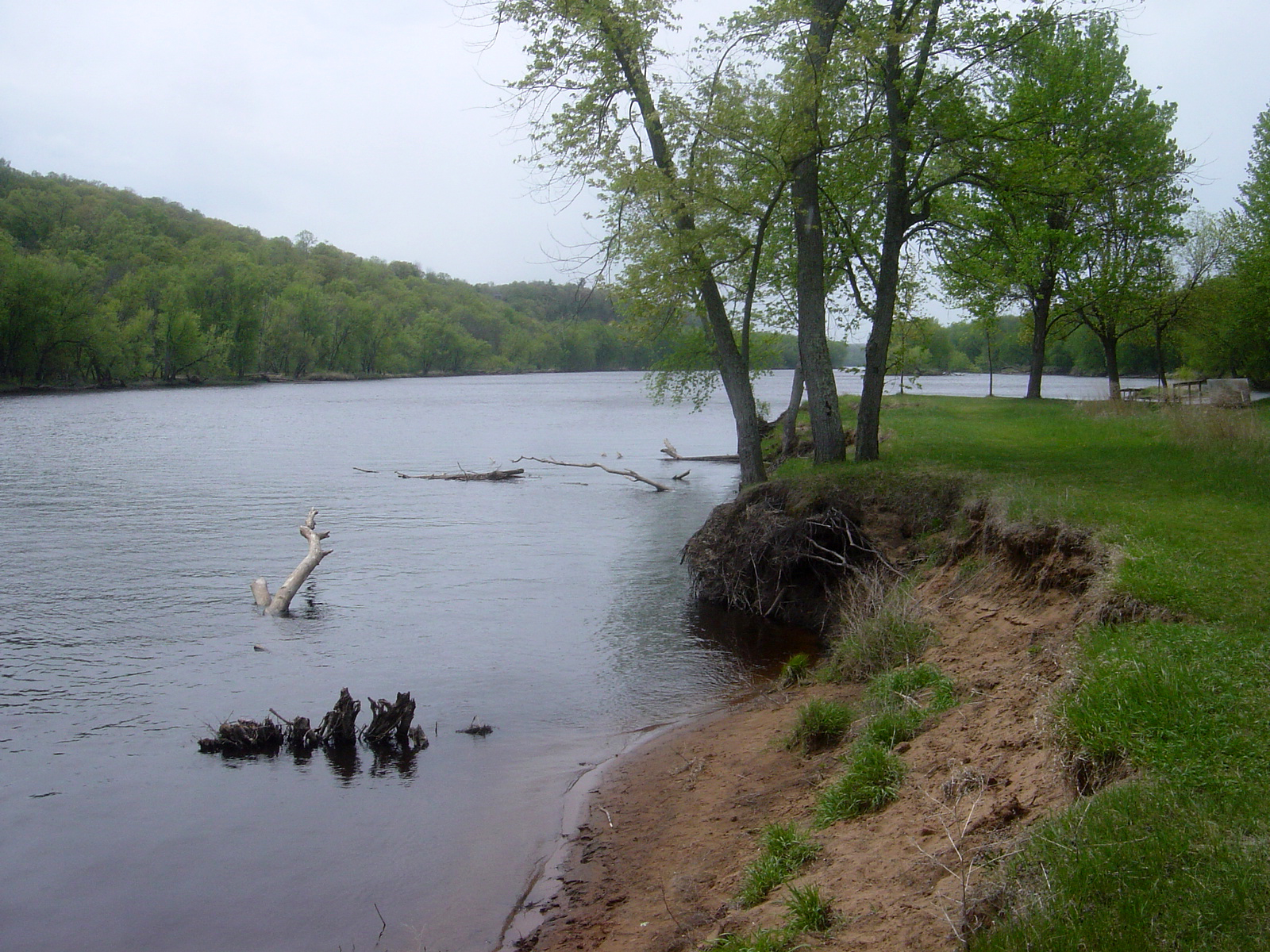
- The St. Croix River from Osceola Landing, near Osceola, Wisconsin.
- Interactive map of Saint Croix National Scenic Riverway
- Location: St. Croix Falls, Wisconsin
- Coordinates: 45°24′57.3″N 92°38′47.6″W
- Area: 67,469.74 acres (273.0404 km^{2})
- Governing body: National Park Service
- Website: Saint Croix National Scenic Riverway

The Saint Croix National Scenic Riverway is a federally protected system of riverways located in eastern Minnesota and northwestern Wisconsin. It protects 252 miles (406 km) of river, including the St. Croix River (on the Wisconsin/Minnesota border), and the Namekagon River (in Wisconsin), as well as adjacent land along the rivers. The St. Croix National Scenic Riverway is one of the original eight National Wild and Scenic Rivers, largely as a result of legislation by senators Walter Mondale of Minnesota and Gaylord Nelson of Wisconsin. The largest scenic riverway east of the Mississippi River, it lies within parts of eight counties in Wisconsin: Bayfield, Burnett, Douglas, Pierce, Polk, St. Croix, Sawyer, and Washburn; and three in Minnesota: Chisago, Pine, and Washington.

== Activities ==
The upper St. Croix is a nationally renowned smallmouth bass fishery. Other fish species present in the riverway include walleye, northern pike, sturgeon, muskellunge, and catfish. The Namekagon River upstream of Hayward, Wisconsin is well known for its brown and brook trout fishing.

Besides fishing, the riverway is a popular destination for canoeing, boating, camping, tubing, and hunting. Camping is provided at dozens of National Park Service-designated sites, at state parks along the river, and, in certain sections, anywhere users wish to camp. The riverway also includes numerous hiking trails, some of which are designated in winter for cross-country skiing.

== Management ==
The riverway is managed overall by the National Park Service. The riverway headquarters and main visitor center are located in St. Croix Falls, Wisconsin, with an additional visitor center in Trego, Wisconsin operated during the summer. Large areas along both sides of the river are also managed by state agencies and include state parks and state forests.

== Parks and public lands ==
- Saint Croix State Forest, MN
- Governor Knowles State Forest, WI
- Saint Croix State Park, MN
- Chengwatana State Forest, MN
- Wild River State Park, MN
- Interstate Park, MN & WI
- William O'Brien State Park, MN
- St. Croix Boom Site, MN
- Afton State Park, MN
- Kinnickinnic State Park, WI
- St. Croix Bluffs Regional Park, MN

== See also ==
- St. Croix River (Wisconsin-Minnesota)
- St. Croix Flowage
- Namekagon River
