= Saint Croix State Park =

St. Croix State Park
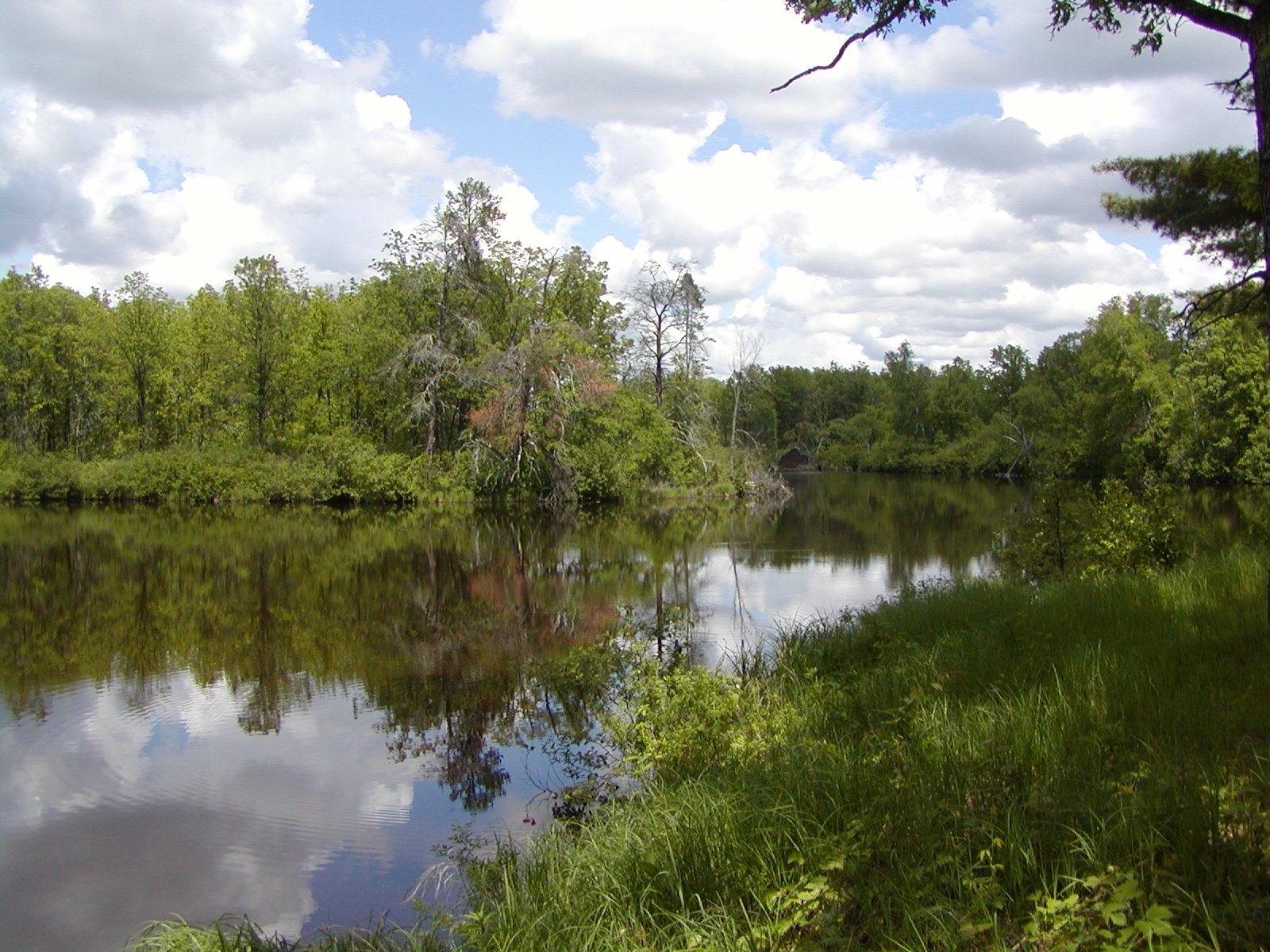
- A lake in Saint Croix State Park

- Location within Minnesota Location within the United States
- Location: Pine, Minnesota, United States
- Coordinates: 45°58′27″N 92°35′1″W
- Area: 33,895 acres (137.17 km^{2})
- Elevation: 935 ft (285 m)
- Established: 1943
- Governing body: Minnesota Department of Natural Resources

- St. Croix Recreational Demonstration Area
- U.S. National Register of Historic Places
- U.S. National Historic Landmark
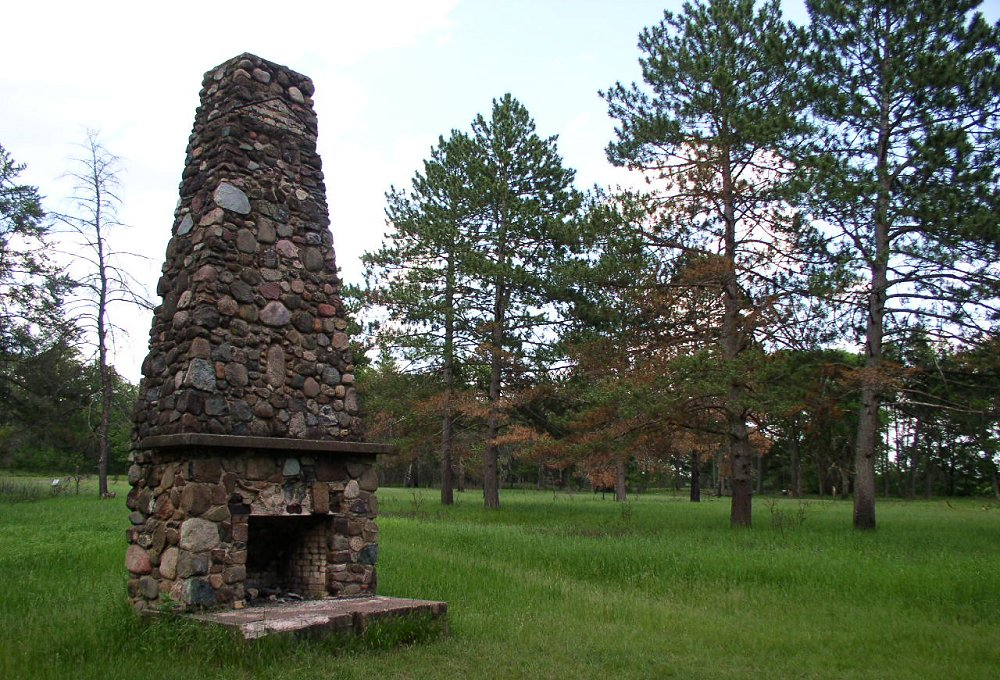
- The chimney of the recreation hall is the only remains of the Yellowbanks Civilian Conservation Corps camp
- Nearest city: Hinckley, Minnesota
- Area: 34,047 acres (13,778 ha)
- Built: 1936
- Architect: National Park Service, Civilian Conservation Corps; George Nason, Edward W. Barber, Edward W., et al.
- Architectural style: Bungalow/Craftsman, NPS rustic
- MPS: Minnesota State Park CCC/WPA/Rustic Style MPS
- NRHP reference No.: 96001594 and 97001261,

Significant dates
- Added to NRHP: January 31, 1997 (original); September 25, 1997 (revised)
- Designated NHL: September 25, 1997

St. Croix State Park is a state park in Pine County, Minnesota, USA. The park follows the shore of the St. Croix River for 21 miles (34 km) and contains the last 7 miles (11 km) of the Kettle River. At 33,895 acres (13,717 ha) it is the largest Minnesota state park. It was developed as a Recreational Demonstration Area in the 1930s, and is one of the finest surviving properties of this type in the nation. 164 structures built by the Civilian Conservation Corps and the Works Progress Administration survive, the largest collection of New Deal projects in Minnesota. As a historic district they were listed on the National Register of Historic Places and proclaimed a National Historic Landmark in 1997.

== Natural history ==
The St. Croix River Valley was carved by meltwater during the last glacial period circa 10,000 BC. The water deposited a variety of sediments, which compose over 30 different types of soil within the park. Some soils are very sandy while others are made of red or yellow clay. The St. Croix River's exposure of a characteristic yellow clay deposit gave the historic Yellowbanks section of the park its name. The bedrock of the area is mostly buried under 75 to 100 feet (23 to 30 m) of these glacial till deposits. However the underlying basalt and sandstone is exposed in one area along the Kettle River known as the Highbanks, where a final ancient flood of meltwater scoured away the sediments.

In addition to the two rivers, at least ten other streams flow through the park, creating a watershed of hundreds of square miles.

St. Croix State Park is located on the eastern edge of the Mille Lacs Uplands. Initially dominated by red and white pines, the vegetation has been altered by logging and farming. The present secondary forest is a mix of pines, black spruce, sugar maple, and basswood. More open areas form meadows, oak savanna, and jack pine barrens. Numerous lakes, marshes, and streams support wetland and riparian zone plants. Wetlands with no outlet and high acidity support tamarack bogs.

Large mammals found in the park include white-tailed deer, coyotes, raccoons, gray and red foxes, beavers, bobcats, black bears, and Great Lakes wolves. Birds include the ruffed grouse, warbler, flycatcher, eagles, owls, and osprey. They roam along the St. Croix River.

A tornado hit part of the park on July 4, 1977. Straight-line winds toppled trees over hundreds of acres on July 11, 2008, and again on July 1, 2011. In the latter storm, many of the historical structures were damaged. However, there were no injuries as the park was closed due to the 2011 Minnesota state government shutdown.

== Cultural history ==
Evidence of Native American occupation in the park and the St. Croix River Valley has been found dating back 5,000 years. The region was inhabited by the Dakota people by the late 17th century, when French traders began exploring the region. However the Dakota were soon displaced by the Ojibwe.

Fur traders became more numerous, and a trading post was established within what is now St. Croix State Park. Following an 1837 treaty with the Ojibwe the region was opened up to logging, although harvesting in the park did not begin until later in the 19th century. From 1894 to 1898 the Empire Lumber Company operated a rail line, the Flemming Railroad, to transport logs cut farther inland to the St. Croix River. The line ended at Yellowbanks where the logs were rolled down the steep bluffs and floated to sawmills downriver. St. John's Landing, at the northeast end of the park, is named for Ed St. John, who opened a popular boarding house there for lumbermen.

The area was logged out by 1915 and farmers were attracted to the newly cleared land. However the sandy soil was poor and not productive enough to make a living. Most settlers moved away and much of the land was tax-forfeited. Pine County had the most tax delinquent property in Minnesota and suffered abject environmental degradation from cultivation and wildfires like the Great Hinckley Fire.

In 1934 the area was selected for a Recreational Demonstration Area, a New Deal program that provided jobs, paid farmers for poor cropland, and created outdoor recreation opportunities near urban areas (the site is midway between Minneapolis–St. Paul and Duluth). An initial 18,000 acres (7,300 ha) of land were transferred to the U.S. Department of the Interior, as the National Park Service would direct the work of the Civilian Conservation Corps (CCC) and the Works Progress Administration (WPA). A CCC camp was constructed at Yellowbanks, populated first by Company #2762 and later #2706. Crews built the main park road, following the old Flemming Railroad route, and another 25 miles (40 km) of road. Trails and scenic overlooks were established while farm buildings were demolished. From Camp Yellowbanks the crews used sandstone and lumber from within the park to develop five separate areas for visitors. First was park headquarters, second Riverview Campground and a lodge which is now the interpretive center. The other three were group centers constructed by WPA crews: Norway Point for boys, St. John's Landing for girls, and Head of the Rapids for handicapped children. Some crews planted pine, spruce, and hardwood trees to begin reforestation while others conducted wildlife and fire protection work. A CCC crew built a fire tower in 1937. As additional properties were added, St. Croix Recreational Demonstration Area grew to 30,000 acres (120 km^{2}), only slightly smaller than the country's largest RDA at Custer State Park in South Dakota.

As planned following federal development, St. Croix Recreational Demonstration Area was transferred to the state to become St. Croix State Park in 1943. The fire tower was staffed during fire season until 1981, when aerial surveys became the preferred spotting method. St. John's Landing Group Center is now a camp for the Minnesota Conservation Corps.

== Recreation ==
The St. Croix and Kettle Rivers are navigable by canoe or kayak. Camping in the fall is breathtaking when it is possible to see the fall foliage, with October being the peak time to visit.

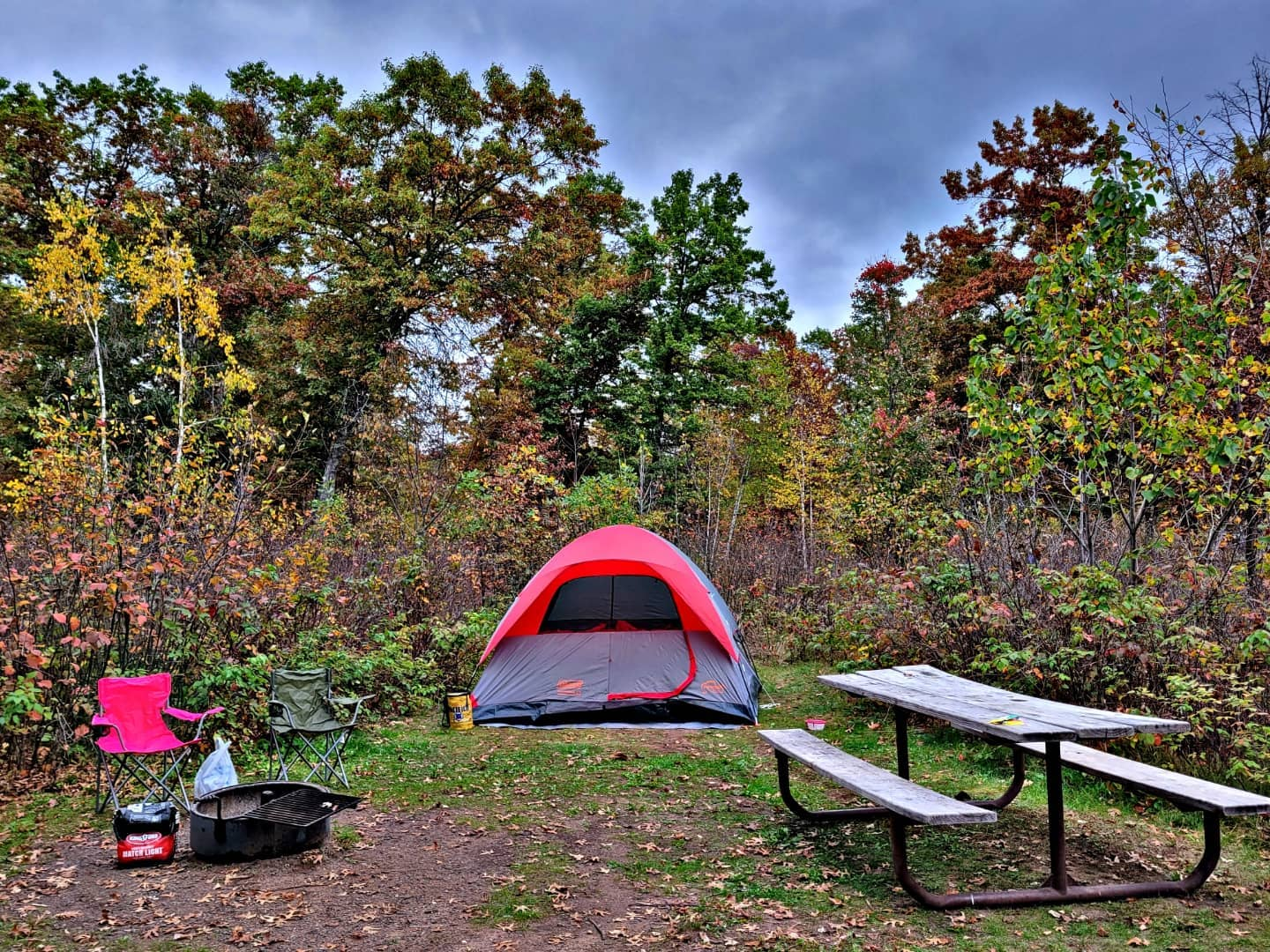
A campsite at St. Croix State Park in the fall.

The St. Croix is entirely flat water while the Kettle contains some rapids. Both rivers support game fish like northern pike, bass, sauger, and muskellunge. Hay Creek and some of the park's other streams contain trout. Hay Creek widens into Lake Clayton, which has a swimming beach and picnic area.

A paved trail leads from Lake Clayton to the drive-in campground, which has three loops with a total of 211 sites. Elsewhere there are eight group campsites and remote campsites for backpackers and canoers. More modern accommodation is provided by two group centers, five cabins, and two guest houses.

Of the trails in the park, 127 miles (204 km) are open for hiking, 75 miles (121 km) for horseback riding, 21 miles (34 km) for mountain biking, 80 miles (130 km) for snowmobiles, and 11 miles (18 km) for cross-country skiing. The Willard Munger State Trail passes through the length of the park. Visitors can climb the 134 steps to the cab of the fire tower; interpretive signs describe the layers of the forest habitat and features of the surrounding countryside.

St. Croix State Park borders Chengwatana State Forest to the southwest and Saint Croix State Forest to the northeast. Governor Knowles State Forest lies across the river in Wisconsin. The entire river corridor is part of the Saint Croix National Scenic Riverway. The Kettle River is designated a State Wild and Scenic River.

== See also ==
- List of National Historic Landmarks in Minnesota
- National Register of Historic Places listings in Pine County, Minnesota
