= Newington Gilbert House =

Historic house in Minnesota, United States

- U.S. National Register of Historic Places
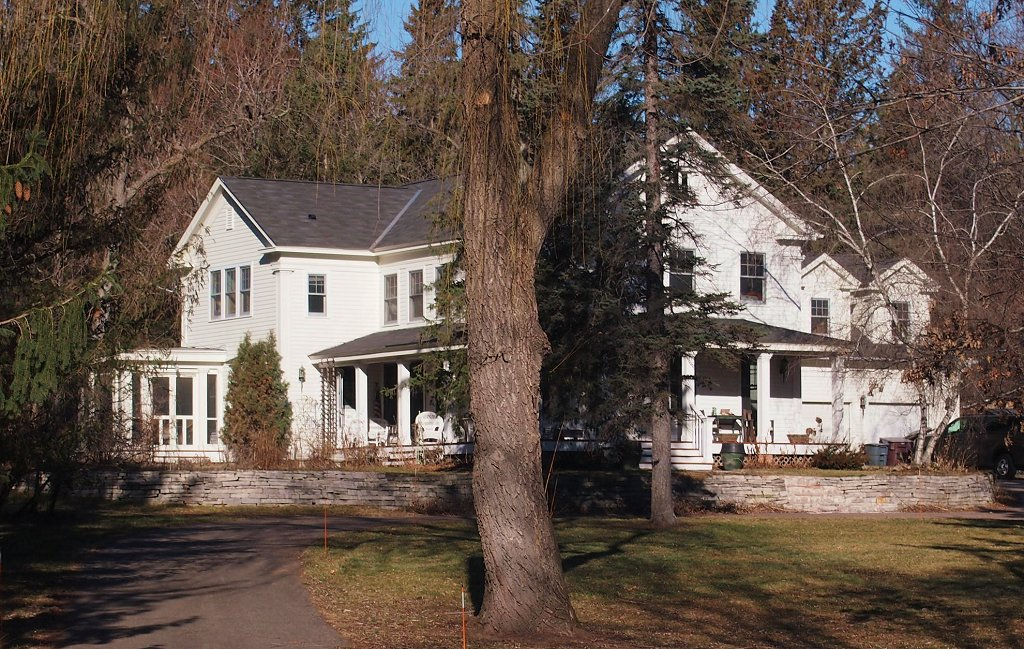
- The Newington Gilbert House viewed from the southeast

- Location within Minnesota Location within the United States
- Location: 1678 Stagecoach Trail, Afton, Minnesota
- Coordinates: 44°55′29″N 92°48′11″W
- Area: Less than seven acres
- Built: 1864
- Architectural style: Greek Revival
- MPS: Valley Creek Residences TR
- NRHP reference No.: 82003073
- Designated: April 20, 1982

The Newington Gilbert House is a historic house in Afton, Minnesota, United States. It was built in 1864 in what was then the separate community of Valley Creek. The house was listed on the National Register of Historic Places in 1982 for its local significance in the themes of architecture and exploration/settlement. As one of the original houses in Valley Creek, it was nominated for helping to depict one of the many small Washington County settlements that formed around a commercial venture—though one that never progressed to formal platting—and the community's two-decade preference for Greek Revival architecture. Valley Creek was later formally incorporated into Afton.

== Description ==
The Newington Gilbert House is a two-story wood-frame building. The original section has a simple rectangular floorplan. Patterned on ancient Greek temples, it sports as decoration full-height pilasters at the front corners, a wide entablature, and gable returns forming a broken pediment. The double-sash windows have straight wooden lintels. while an attic window at the gable peak has a shelf-like hood supported by small brackets. An enclosed porch stretches across the front of the house and wraps around much of the south side as well. The porch has square columns that echo the pilasters on the main structure.

A transverse wing was added to the rear of the Gilbert House sometime after its nomination to the National Register.

== History ==
Newington Gilbert was born in Onondaga County, New York, in 1815. He married his wife Celestia in 1850 and the couple moved out to Washington County, Minnesota, the following year. They initially settled on a farm in Woodbury, where Newington served as a justice of the peace. He was a member of the Democrat delegation to the Minnesota constitutional convention in 1857. In 1860 he and a business partner established a gristmill on Valley Creek. Newington sold his interest in the mill just two years later, but in 1864 the Gilberts moved to the community of Valley Creek and had this home built for themselves and their two children. When Newington died in 1912 at the age of 97, he was the last surviving member of the state constitutional convention.

The Gilbert House was nominated to the National Register of Historic Places as one of three early Valley Creek houses in a 1981 thematic resource study. The Erastus Bolles House was also listed but a third residence, the Silas Geer House, was not.

== See also ==
- National Register of Historic Places listings in Washington County, Minnesota
