= Valley Creek =

Valley Creek may refer to:

- Valley Creek (Minnesota)
- Valley Creek (Pennsylvania)
- Valley Creek (South Dakota)
