= Bolles House =

Bolles House may refer to:

- House at 7144 Madrid Avenue, Jacksonville, Florida, also known as the Bolles House, NRHP-listed
- Erastus Bolles House, Afton, Minnesota, listed on the NRHP in Washington County, Minnesota
- Charles Bolles House, Belle Fourche, South Dakota, National Register of Historic Places listings in Butte County, South Dakota
