= Lake De Montreville =

Lake in the state of Minnesota, United States

- Location within Minnesota
- Location: Washington County, Minnesota
- Coordinates: 45°1′22″N 92°56′28″W
- Type: lake

Lake De Montreville is a lake in Washington County, in the U.S. state of Minnesota.

Lake De Montreville was named for a dentist who built a resort house near the lake.

== See also ==
- List of lakes in Minnesota
