= St. Croix Bluffs Regional Park =

Park in Minnesota, United States

Coordinates: 44°48.08′N 92°48.24′W

Saint Croix Bluffs Regional Park is a 579-acre park in Washington County, Minnesota. Located just outside Denmark Township on the Saint Croix River, the park is the southernmost public park on the Saint Croix National Scenic Riverway. St. Croix Bluffs Regional Park on St. Croix Trail opened in 1996 on a site purchased and developed in the 1940s by architect Thomas Ellerbe, later the Control Data Corporation employee park. It is one of seven regional parks in Washington County. The park has rolling prairies, wooded ravines, and scenic bluffs. It is managed by the Minnesota Department of Natural Resources.

== Natural history ==
Saint Croix Bluffs Regional Park lies atop glacial moraine like much of Washington County. It has some surviving prairies and oak savannas. It borders the Saint Croix River for nearly three quarters of a mile.

== Recreation ==
The park has 73 campsites, 11 tent only and 26 RV only. A playground is located next to the campsites.

The park has a dock and boat landing located on a small inlet of the Saint Croix River. It is one of five free public boat landings on the Lower Saint Croix River. The river near there is a fishery for smallmouth bass, northern pike, muskellunge, and sturgeon.

Four miles of hiking trails wind through prairie, woods, and the lower St Croix River Valley. One mile of paved biking trail links the park office to the campground.

== See also ==
- Lebanon Hills Regional Park
