= Eagle Point Lake =

Lake in the state of Minnesota, United States

- Location within Minnesota Location within the United States
- Location: Washington County, Minnesota
- Coordinates: 44°58′36″N 92°54′44″W
- Type: lake
- Basin countries: United States
- Surface elevation: 892 ft (272 m)

Eagle Point Lake is a lake in Washington County, in the U.S. state of Minnesota.

Eagle Point Lake was so named for the fact eagles nested on its peninsula.

== See also ==
- List of lakes in Minnesota
