= Erastus Bolles House =

Historic house in Minnesota, United States

- U.S. National Register of Historic Places
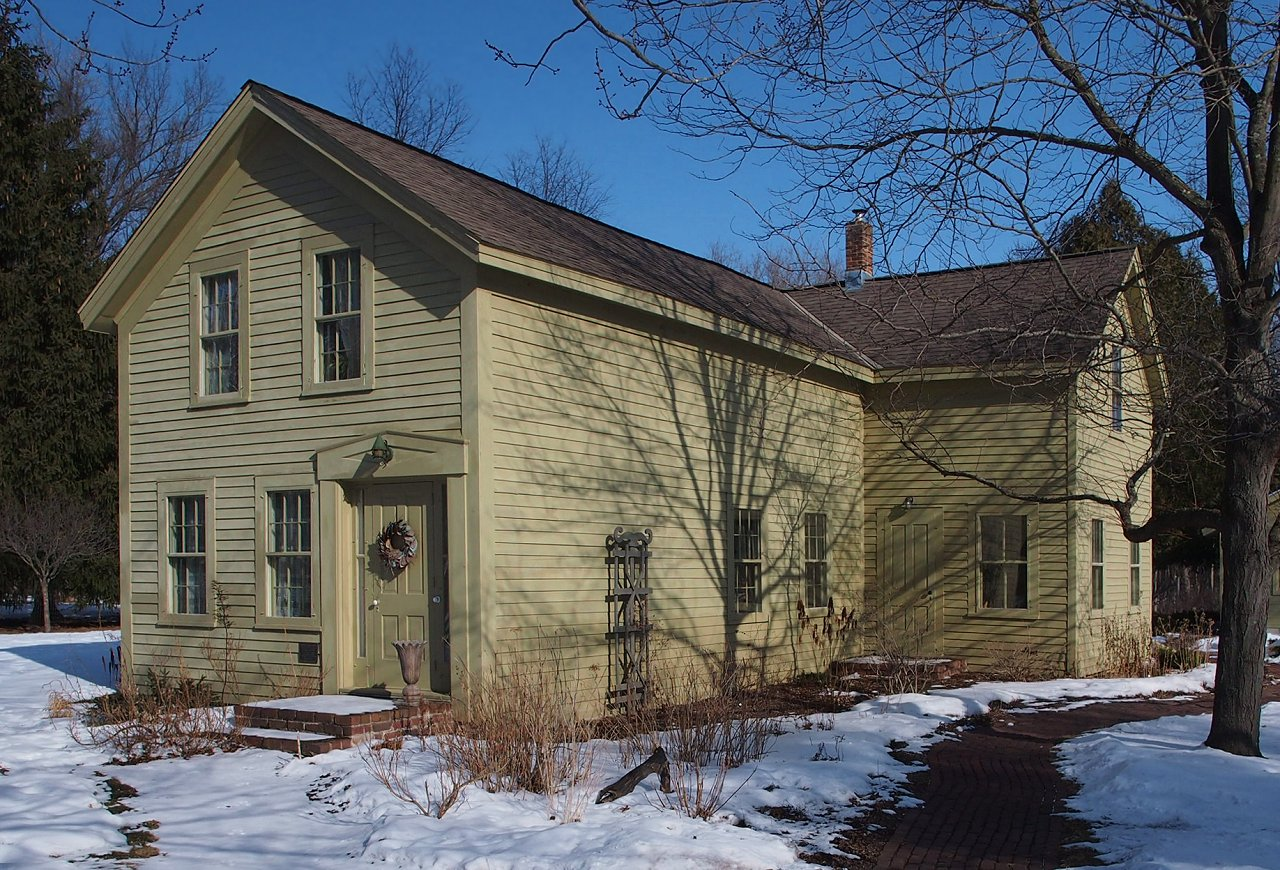
- The Erastus Bolles House viewed from the southwest

- Location within Minnesota Location within the United States
- Location: 1741 Stagecoach Trail, Afton, Minnesota
- Coordinates: 44°55′24.8″N 92°48′5″W
- Area: Less than four acres
- Built: 1856
- Architectural style: Greek Revival
- MPS: Valley Creek Residences TR
- NRHP reference No.: 82003072
- Designated: April 20, 1982

The Erastus Bolles House is a historic house in Afton, Minnesota, United States. It was built in 1856 in what was then the separate community of Valley Creek. The house was listed on the National Register of Historic Places in 1982 for its local significance in the themes of architecture and exploration/settlement. As one of the original houses in Valley Creek, it was nominated for helping to depict one of the many small Washington County settlements that formed around a commercial venture—though one that never progressed to formal platting—and the community's two-decade preference for Greek Revival architecture. Valley Creek was later formally incorporated into Afton.

== Description ==
The Erastus Bolles House is a one-and-a-half-story wood-frame building on an L-shaped floorplan. Its design is extremely simple. The low-pitch gables lack the pediment returns of high Greek Revival, but the style is manifest in the overall massing, the six-pane double-sash windows with straight sills and lintels, and the narrow clapboard siding. The main entrance is offset to the right edge of the front façade. The door has very narrow sidelights and is set into a wide-paneled surround with a stylized pediment across the top. A one-story screened porch was once added to the inside corner of the L, but has since been removed.

== History ==
Erastus Bolles was born in Madison County, New York, in 1821. In 1855 he traveled to Minnesota to visit his uncle Lemuel Bolles, who had settled in Washington County in 1842 and built the first private gristmill north of Prairie du Chien, Wisconsin. The younger Bolles liked what he saw and returned the following year with his wife Sophronia and their children to settle permanently. They picked a location a little farther up Valley Creek from Lemuel's mill, adjacent to the Point Douglas to Superior Military Road, where they constructed this house and a blacksmith shop.

Once a year in the fall the Bolles family would travel to Saint Paul to purchase winter supplies, a journey that involved setting out with a team of oxen at 3:00 in the morning.

Erastus Bolles, who had trained as a blacksmith and toolmaker with his father, harnessed water from Valley Creek in 1858 to power a trip hammer and other equipment, allowing him to expand into manufacturing farm implements. A community taking its name from the waterway grew around Bolles's business. In 1863 the Valley Creek School was first organized, meeting initially in the Bolles home until a schoolhouse could be moved onto land Erastus sold for the nominal fee of a dollar. In the early 1870s he opened a retail store, becoming postmaster of Valley Creek. Upon their daughter Emma's wedding to Silas Geer in 1873, Erastus and Sophronia gave them land across the road as a wedding present, upon which they built their own house. In 1875 Erastus transferred the smithy business to their son Charles, who soon relocated it a short distance downstream and added corn and feed grinding facilities. The Bolles store burned down in 1880 but Erastus had it rebuilt and turned it over to Charles and his other son Fred. Erastus Bolles died the following year.

The Bolles House was nominated to the National Register of Historic Places as one of three early Valley Creek houses in a 1981 thematic resource study. The Newington Gilbert House was also listed but the third residence, built for the Bolleses' daughter and son-in-law, was not.

== See also ==
- National Register of Historic Places listings in Washington County, Minnesota
