= Basswood Grove, Minnesota =

Basswood Grove
- Unincorporated community
- Location within Minnesota Location within the United States
- Coordinates: 44°49′38″N 92°47′58″W
- Country: United States
- State: Minnesota
- County: Washington County
- Township: Denmark Township
- Elevation: 961 ft (293 m)
- Time zone: UTC-6 (Central (CST))
  - Summer (DST): UTC-5 (CDT)
- ZIP code: 55033
- Area code: 651
- GNIS feature ID: 654588

Basswood Grove is an unincorporated community in Denmark Township, Washington County, Minnesota, United States. The community is located along Washington County Road 21 (St. Croix Trail South) near 80th Street South and 87th Street South.

Nearby places include Cottage Grove, Afton, and Hastings.
