= District No. 34 School =

- U.S. National Register of Historic Places
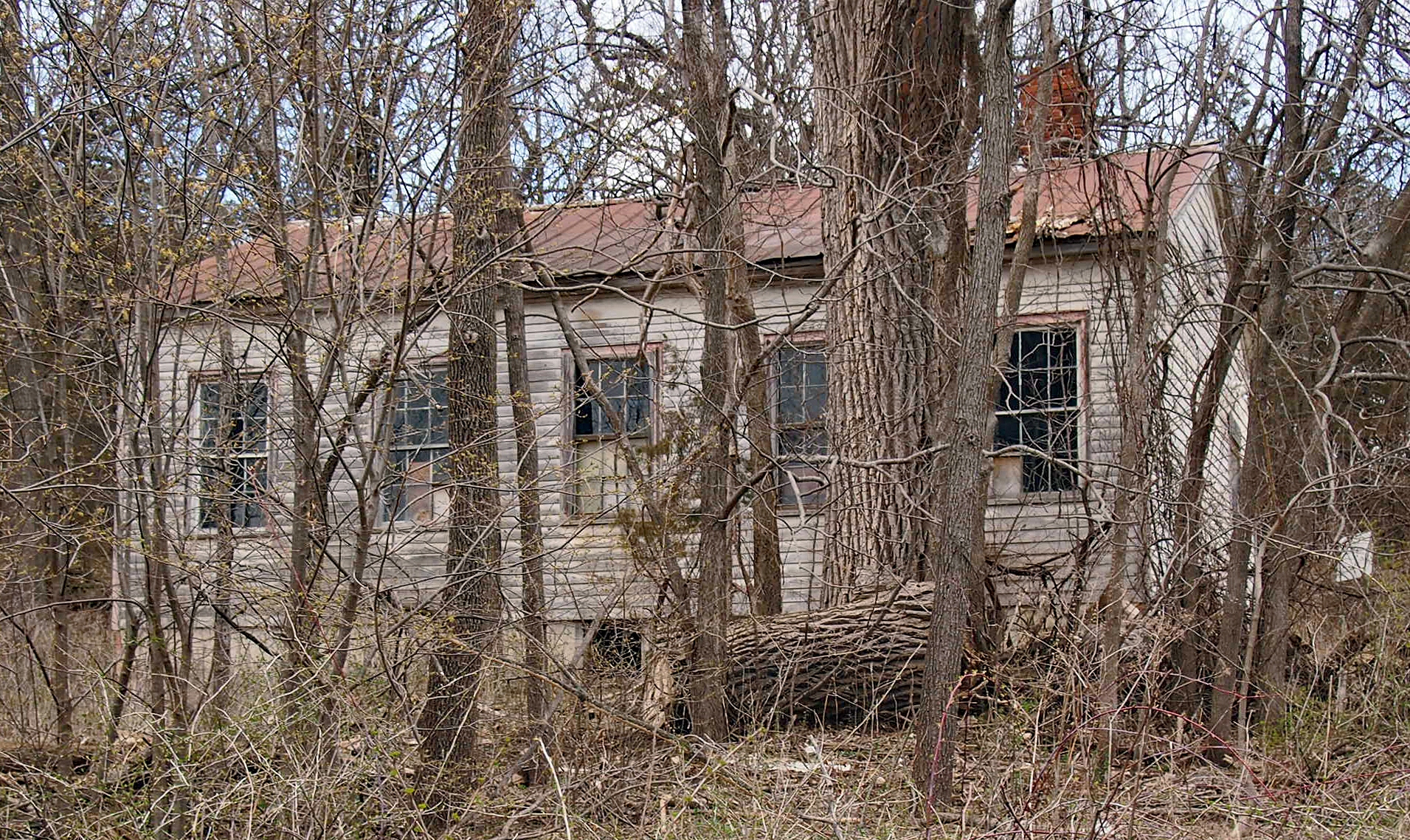
- District No. 34 School viewed from the south

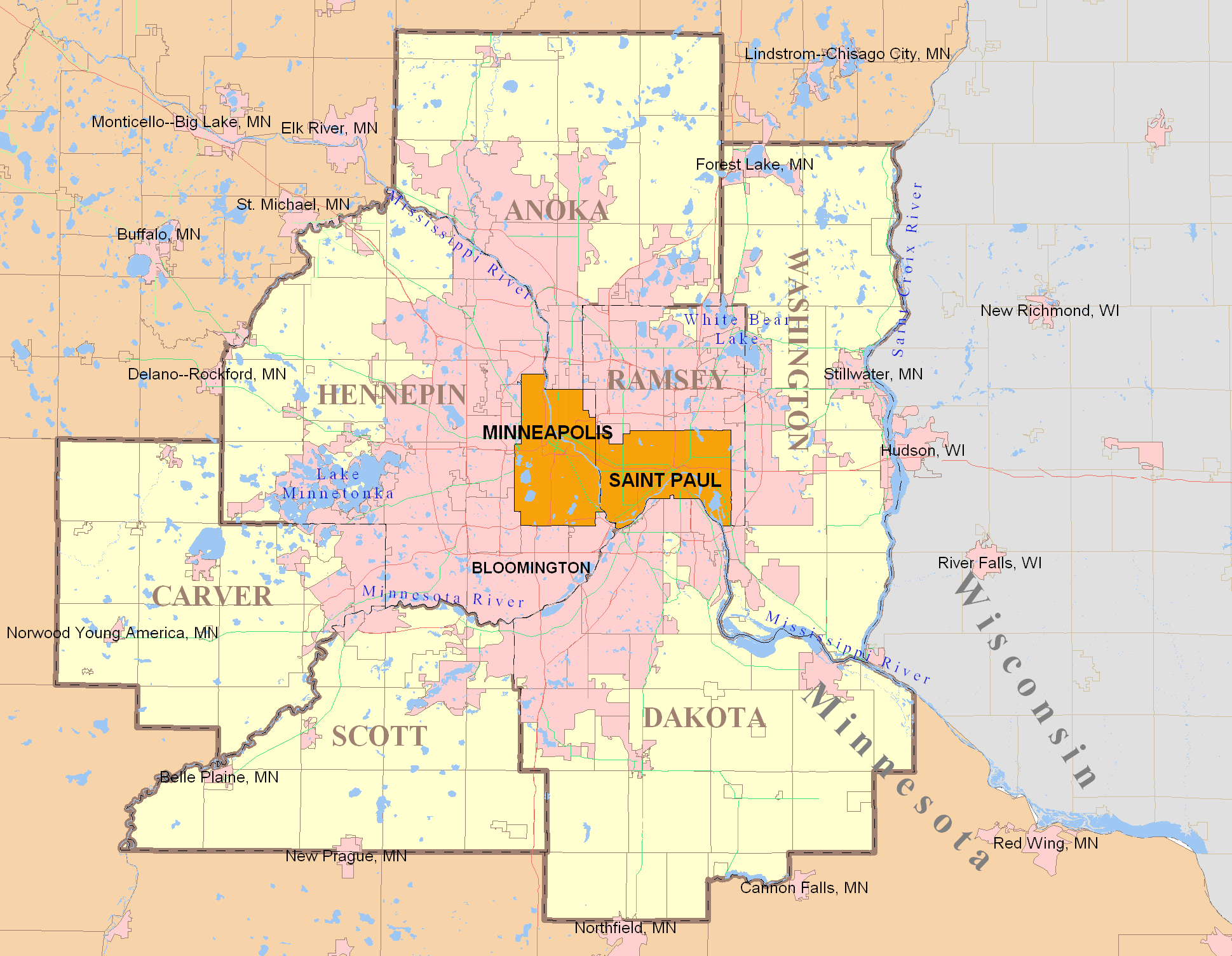
- Location within Minneapolis–Saint Paul Location within Minnesota Location within the United States
- Location: 13728 St. Croix Trail South, Denmark Township, Minnesota
- Coordinates: 44°45′5.5″N 92°49′1.5″W
- Area: .52 acres (0.21 ha)
- Built: c. 1852
- Architectural style: Greek Revival
- NRHP reference No.: 14000220
- Designated: May 19, 2014

District No. 34 School is a former school building in Denmark Township, Minnesota, United States. It was built around 1852 and remained in active use until 1946. It was listed on the National Register of Historic Places in 2014 for its local significance in the theme of education. It was nominated for being a representative example of the rural one-room schoolhouses of the mid-19th-century.

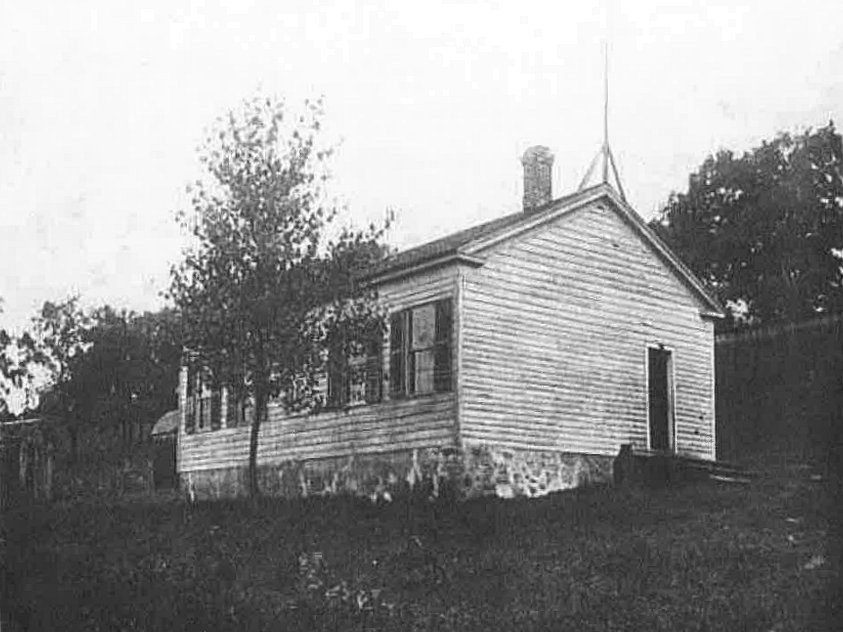
The school circa 1910

== See also ==
- National Register of Historic Places listings in Washington County, Minnesota
