= Cushing Hotel =

- U.S. National Register of Historic Places
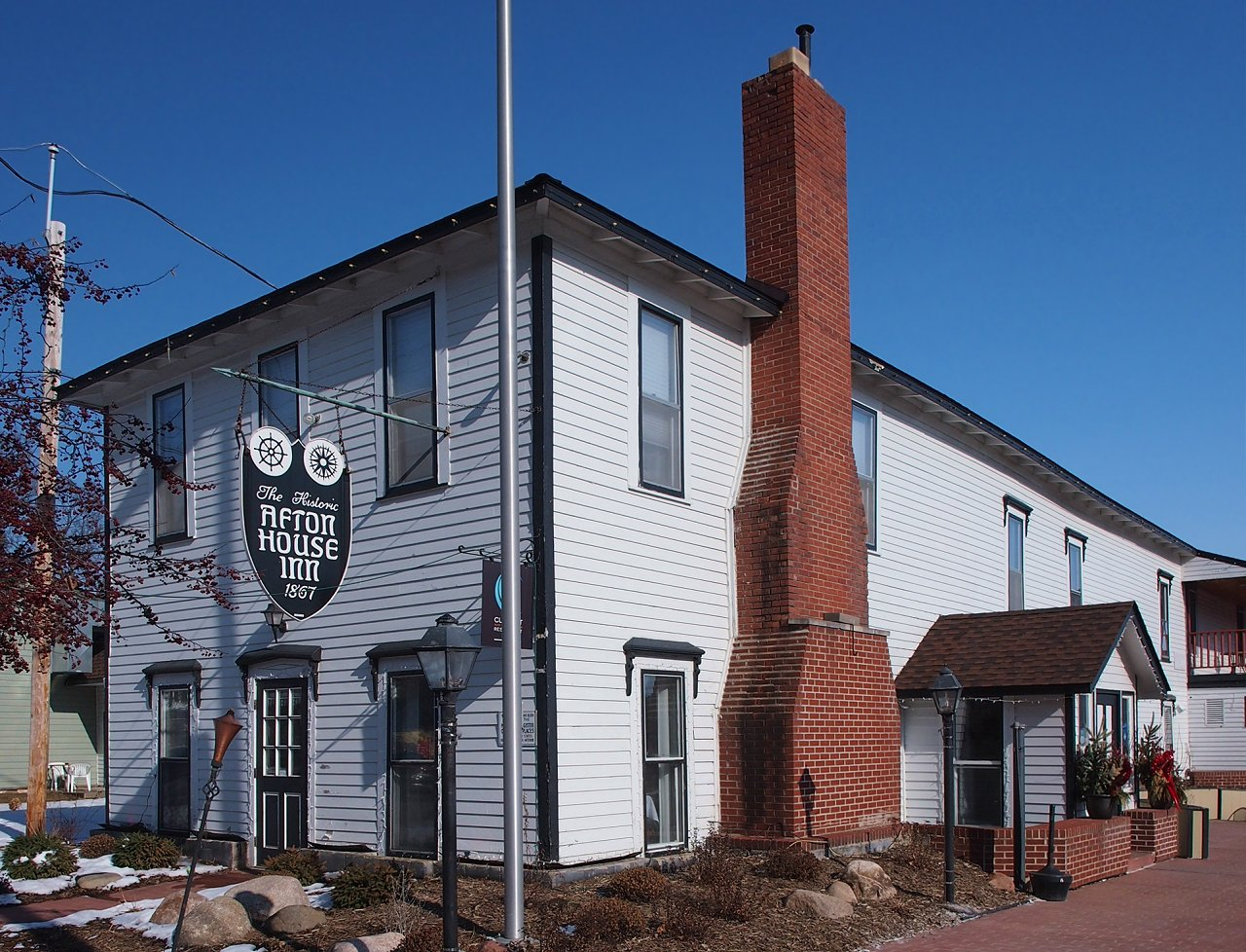
- The original section of the Cushing Hotel

- Location within Minnesota Location within the United States
- Location: 3291 St. Croix Trail South, Afton, Minnesota
- Coordinates: 44°54′3.3″N 92°46′58.5″W
- Area: .08 acres (0.032 ha)
- Built: 1867
- NRHP reference No.: 85000098
- Designated NRHP: January 17, 1985

The Cushing Hotel is a historic hotel in Afton, Minnesota, United States, established in 1867 to cater to railroad workers, lumbermen, and travelers. The hotel was listed on the National Register of Historic Places in 1985 for its local significance in the theme of commerce. It was nominated for exemplifying the commercial lodging common to mid-19th-century river towns. It remains in business as the Afton House Inn.

== Description ==
The original section of the Cushing Hotel is a simple two-story wood-frame building. It measures 24 by 80 feet (7.3 by 24.4 m) and is topped with a hip roof. The building was constructed of locally milled white pine and sheathed in clapboard. Decoration is very minimal, primarily consisting of thin lintels over some doors and windows.

The building has been expanded and altered over the years. Early on a two-story wing was added to the rear to create additional rooms. Around 1907 a screened porch was added across the front façade. Later the south façade gained a brick chimney and a gabled entrance vestibule. Additions were made to the north and rear to expand the bar and restaurant. Extensive work in the 1980s removed the screened porch and restored much of the historical appearance of the original wing.

== History ==
The village of Afton, formally organized in 1858, was situated on two main travel routes in early Minnesota: the St. Croix River and the Point Douglas to Superior Military Road. The town's first hotel was built in 1856 but it was completely destroyed by a fire in 1861. Six years later Charles C. Cushing built this hotel on the same site. He died in 1876 but his wife kept the business in operation, bolstered by a growing number of leisure travelers.

There is a gap in the building's history leading up to the turn of the 20th century, but in 1907 it was acquired by Mary Pennington and operated exclusively as a restaurant. "Mother Mary", as she was known, managed it until her death in 1946. In 1960 Messrs. Smith and Myers bought the building and added the Catfish Saloon. In 1967, on its hundredth anniversary, new owner Hugh Andersen remodeled the hotel, adding a dining room and a screened rear porch. Gordon and Kathy Jarvis purchased the hotel in 1976 and began more remodeling, with work supervised by a local woodcarver. They had the hotel listed on the National Register in 1985.

== See also ==
- List of hotels in the United States
- National Register of Historic Places listings in Washington County, Minnesota
