= Hilltop, Minnesota =

City in Minnesota, United States

Hilltop
- City
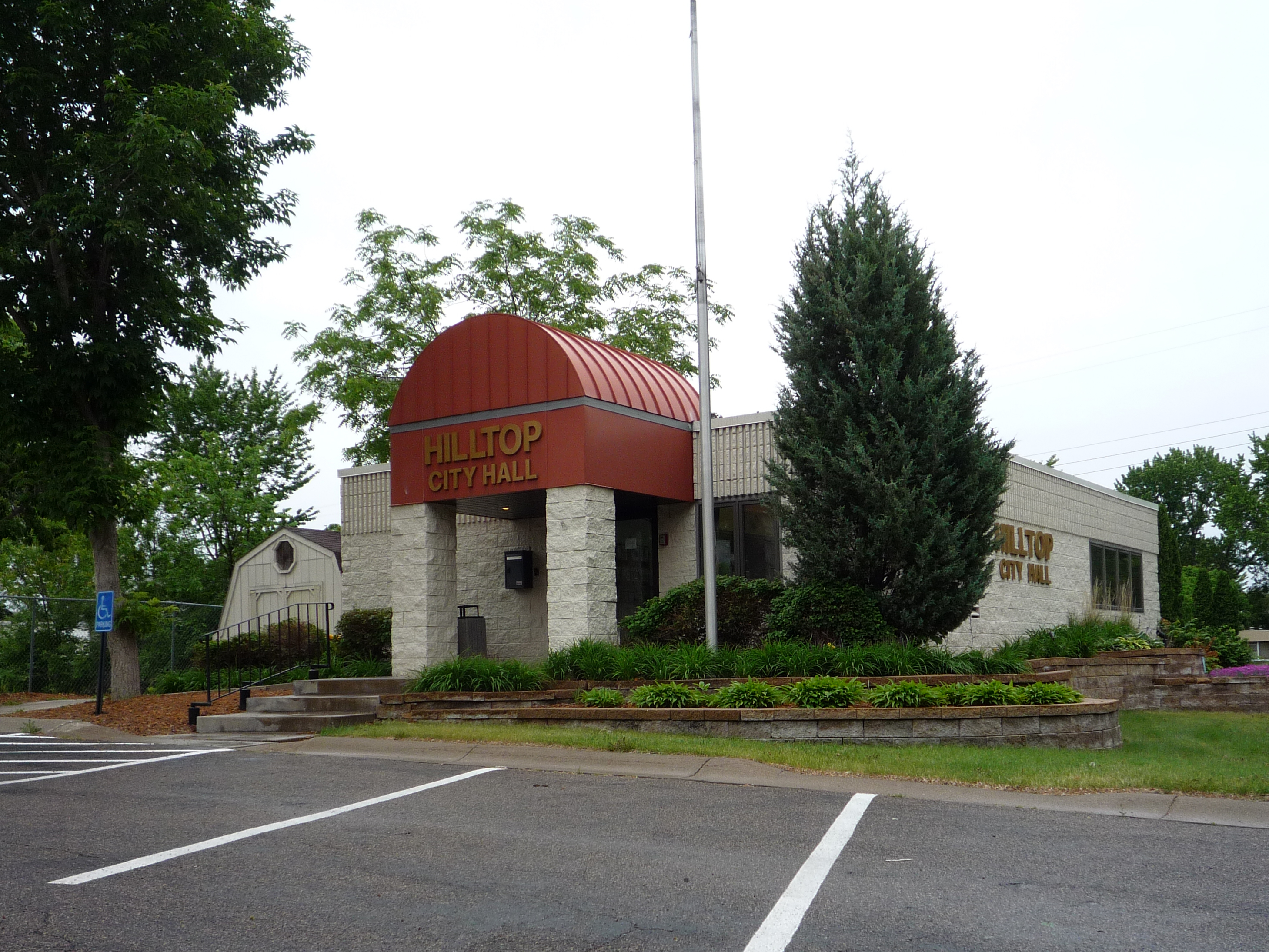
- Hilltop City Hall
- Motto: "Little City With A Big Heart"
- Interactive map of Hilltop
- Coordinates: 45°03′13″N 93°14′58″W
- Country: United States
- State: Minnesota
- County: Anoka
- Incorporated: May 4, 1956

Government
  - Mayor: Terry W. Wiggin

Area
  - Total: 0.12 sq mi (0.31 km^{2})
  - Land: 0.12 sq mi (0.31 km^{2})
  - Water: 0 sq mi (0.00 km^{2})
- Elevation: 935 ft (285 m)

Population (2020)
  - Total: 958
  - Estimate (2024): 956
  - Density: 8,034.0/sq mi (3,101.93/km^{2})
- Time zone: UTC−6 (Central (CST))
  - Summer (DST): UTC−5 (CDT)
- ZIP code: 55421
- Area code: 763
- FIPS code: 27-29258
- GNIS feature ID: 2394389
- Sales tax: 8.125%
- Website: hilltopmn.gov

Hilltop is a city in Anoka County, Minnesota, United States. The population was 958 at the 2020 census.

The city is a small enclave within the city of Columbia Heights and consists of 16 city blocks. Minnesota State Highway 65 (Central Avenue) serves as a main route, running on the town's eastern edge.

Most of Hilltop's residents live in the 263 mobile homes across four trailer parks within the city's borders. Hilltop is one of only two incorporated cities in Minnesota that consist primarily of manufactured housing; the second is another Twin Cities suburb, Landfall.

== Geography ==
According to the United States Census Bureau, the city has an area of 0.12 square miles (0.31 km^{2}), all land.

Hilltop is an enclave within Columbia Heights.

== History ==
The land where Hilltop sits was originally an unincorporated part of the former Fridley Township, a civil township next to the city of Fridley. The land had a dairy farm and was later the Oak Grove Riding Academy and Stables. The first trailer park, Trailer City, opened on the land in the 1940s; another park, Sunnyside, soon opened next door. Residents of two trailer parks became concerned that the township was planning to remove the mobile homes. In 1956, led by Trailer City Park owner Les Johnson, they approached Columbia Heights and requested to be annexed by the city. Columbia Heights turned down their request, so Johnson circulated a petition to have the residents vote on incorporation. The petition for incorporation passed, 137 to 34, and Hilltop was created. The city was named after a nearby drive-in cinema.

Columbia Heights soon annexed all the land surrounding Hilltop and began to make antagonistic moves toward the young town, at one point threatening to halt Hilltop's water and sewer service for punitive reasons. Another source of conflict was Hilltop's plan to issue liquor licenses, which would compete with Columbia Heights's municipal liquor store that accounted for a third of the city's operating budget. Instead of initially contracting with Columbia Heights, Hilltop contracted its fire protection from Fridley and established its own police department by hiring a retired highway patrolman as police chief and three part-time officers. By 1959, tensions rose to the point where the Metropolitan Municipalities Commission, a predecessor of the Twin Cities-wide Metropolitan Council, asked then State Attorney General Walter Mondale to contest the Hilltop charter to the Minnesota Supreme Court.

Hilltop's first mayor was William Wychor, who instituted ordinances prohibiting activities such as "fortune tellers and other such like imposters"; "a person known to be a pickpocket, thief, burglar, yeggman, or confidence man and having no visible or lawful means of support"; and anyone "procuring or attempting to solicit money or any other thing of value by falsely pretending and representing himself to be blind, deaf, dumb, without arms or legs, or to be otherwise physically deficient".

By 1961, Hilltop was growing in population and tax revenue after attracting construction of a strip mall including a supermarket, drugstore, and liquor store, in addition to a bowling alley (with liquor license) and motel. Columbia Heights media began insinuating that Hilltop's liquor licenses were illegal, but gave no evidence. In the mid-1960s, Hilltop constructed a water tower that allowed it to tap the Minneapolis water supply and end its conflict with Columbia Heights. In 1967, the town's population had reached 1,039. Tension between the rival cities began to abate in 1968, when Hilltop mayor Vivian Caesar and Columbia Heights mayor Bruce Nawrocki met alongside their respective city councils. Hilltop's police department closed in 1972, when one of its officers drove the town's only squad car into a tree. Unable to afford a replacement, the department disbanded and the town instead paid the Columbia Heights Police Department for service; rescue services were also contracted to Columbia Heights on a per-incident fee.

Hilltop led the Twin Cities area in population loss during the 1970s, going from a high of 1,015 to 817 in 1980. Due to the town's small size and fascination with the trailer park stereotype, what were sometimes smaller incidents made major headlines in local media. In 1970, then-mayor George Reiter attempted to replace the female village clerk because he believed men were temperamentally better suited for the position, a view shared by many of his supporters. Murders were especially troubling for the residents. In 1976, Edwin Clay Hull and Ronald D. Gilbert perpetrated a triple homicide in Hilltop. Both received life sentences. In 1980, three prison escapees were captured hiding out in the trailer of one of their mothers. In 1987, there was a murder-suicide involving a brother and sister.

In 1991, city manager Karen Danz, who had held the position for 20 years, was arrested and convicted of embezzling over $200,000 from the city treasury. Her son’s band, Fortress, which had made a "best up-and-coming Minnesota bands" list in Rolling Stone magazine, never played another gig after the arrest. Hilltop's annual budget was $250,000 at the time, and the crisis nearly drove the city to bankruptcy and jeopardized its police protection agreement with Columbia Heights. The city was ultimately saved by insurance and a fidelity bond. In 1995, Hilltop received more unwanted attention when the Star Tribune ran the headline "Tiny Hilltop is Crime Capital" due to its 131 serious crimes in 1994, which worked out to one for every six residents.

== Government ==
Hilltop's government consists of a mayor and a four-person city council. The city manager is the town's only full-time employee. As of 2003, the mayor's salary was $300 a month and council members received $250 a month.

Police services are contracted to Columbia Heights Police Department based on an annual fee; rescue services are also handled by Columbia Heights on a per-incident fee. Fire department services are contracted to the Columbia Heights Fire Department.

== Demographics ==
Historical population
Census	Pop.	Note	%±
1960	607		—
1970	1,015		67.2%
1980	817		−19.5%
1990	749		−8.3%
2000	766		2.3%
2010	744		−2.9%
2020	958		28.8%
2022 (est.)	952		−0.6%
U.S. Decennial Census; 2020 Census

=== 2010 census ===
As of the census of 2010, there were 744 people, 380 households, and 151 families residing in the city. The population density was 6,200.0 inhabitants per square mile (2,393.8/km^{2}). There were 414 housing units at an average density of 3,450.0 per square mile (1,332.1/km^{2}). The racial makeup of the city was 71.0% White, 11.3% African American, 1.6% Native American, 2.7% Asian, 6.9% from other races, and 6.6% from two or more races. Hispanic or Latino of any race were 16.9% of the population.

There were 380 households, of which 25.0% had children under the age of 18 living with them, 17.9% were married couples living together, 14.2% had a female householder with no husband present, 7.6% had a male householder with no wife present, and 60.3% were non-families. 47.4% of all households were made up of individuals, and 11.3% had someone living alone who was 65 years of age or older. The average household size was 1.96 and the average family size was 2.82.

The median age in the city was 42.7 years. 20.3% of residents were under the age of 18; 7.7% were between the ages of 18 and 24; 25.4% were from 25 to 44; 35.9% were from 45 to 64; and 10.6% were 65 years of age or older. The gender makeup of the city was 53.2% male and 46.8% female.

=== 2000 census ===
As of the census of 2000, there were 766 people, 400 households, and 165 families residing in the city. The population density was 6,111.3 inhabitants per square mile (2,359.6/km^{2}). There were 426 housing units at an average density of 3,398.7 per square mile (1,312.2/km^{2}). The racial makeup of the city was 82.64% White, 6.66% African American, 3.00% Native American, 3.39% Asian, 0.65% from other races, and 3.66% from two or more races. Hispanic or Latino of any race were 5.35% of the population.

There were 400 households, out of which 23.8% had children under the age of 18 living with them, 17.8% were married couples living together, 19.0% had a female householder with no husband present, and 58.8% were non-families. 51.5% of all households were made up of individuals, and 8.3% had someone living alone who was 65 years of age or older. The average household size was 1.89 and the average family size was 2.69.

In the city, the population was spread out, with 20.9% under the age of 18, 9.7% from 18 to 24, 35.0% from 25 to 44, 26.2% from 45 to 64, and 8.2% who were 65 years of age or older. The median age was 36 years. For every 100 females, there were 103.2 males. For every 100 females age 18 and over, there were 104.0 males.

The median income for a household in the city was $26,528, and the median income for a family was $32,875. Males had a median income of $28,295 versus $25,652 for females. The per capita income for the city was $16,576. About 17.7% of families and 21.4% of the population were below the poverty line, including 28.9% of those under age 18 and 10.3% of those age 65 or over. For those 85 and older (4.29%), they accounted for an average of income $6,693 and were 96.4% Caucasian, 1.5% African American, 0.4% Hispanic and 0.3% Indian.
