= Garen, Minnesota =

Ghost town in Minnesota, United States

Coordinates: 45°13′30″N 92°58′54″W

Garen is an abandoned settlement in Washington County, Minnesota, United States. Garen was located south of Forest Lake, on present U.S. Route 61.

== History ==
Garen was founded after a spark from a Northern Pacific Railway train ignited a fire in a peat bog located there.

Local cattle farmers sued the railway, and as part of the settlement, the railway built a siding with cattle pens so farmers could load cattle into boxcars for shipment to the Saint Paul stockyards. A boxcar was used as a station.

The settlement was named for Frank and Sarah Garen, whose farm had been affected by the fire.

Garen prospered during the early 1900s, and had a store, and a school that was used as a community center. During the 1930s and 1940s, the Half-Way Inn was located there.
