= Denmark Township, Washington County, Minnesota =

Denmark Township, Minnesota
- Township
- Location within the state of Minnesota Denmark Township, Minnesota (the United States)
- Coordinates: 44°48′16″N 92°49′26″W
- Country: United States
- State: Minnesota
- County: Washington

Area
  - Total: 30.4 sq mi (78.8 km^{2})
  - Land: 28.6 sq mi (74.1 km^{2})
  - Water: 1.8 sq mi (4.7 km^{2})
- Elevation: 892 ft (272 m)

Population (2020)
  - Total: 1,801
- Time zone: UTC-6 (Central (CST))
  - Summer (DST): UTC-5 (CDT)
- Area code: 651
- FIPS code: 27-15688
- GNIS feature ID: 0663965
- Website: www.denmarktownship.org

Denmark Township is a township in Washington County, Minnesota, United States. The population was 1,801 at the 2020 census. The unincorporated community of Basswood Grove is located within Denmark Township.

Denmark Township was organized in 1858.

== Recreation ==
Afton Alps Ski Area and Afton State Park are located within the township.

== Geography ==
According to the United States Census Bureau, the township has a total area of 30.4 square miles (79 km^{2}), of which 28.6 square miles (74 km^{2}) is land and 1.8 square miles (4.7 km^{2}) (5.95%) is water. County 21 serves as a main route in the township.

The ghost town of Point Douglas is located within the township. The township contains one property listed on the National Register of Historic Places, the 1852 District No. 34 School.

== Demographics ==
As of the census of 2000, there were 1,348 people, 481 households, and 404 families residing in the township. The population density was 47.1 inhabitants per square mile (18.2/km^{2}). There were 503 housing units at an average density of 17.6 per square mile (6.8/km^{2}). The racial makeup of the township was 98.22% White, 0.15% Asian, 0.15% Pacific Islander, 0.82% from other races, and 0.67% from two or more races. Hispanic or Latino of any race were 1.19% of the population.

There were 481 households, out of which 32.6% had children under the age of 18 living with them, 76.5% were married couples living together, 4.6% had a female householder with no husband present, and 16.0% were non-families. 12.9% of all households were made up of individuals, and 4.6% had someone living alone who was 65 years of age or older. The average household size was 2.80 and the average family size was 3.08.

In the township the population was spread out, with 23.2% under the age of 18, 7.9% from 18 to 24, 25.5% from 25 to 44, 33.2% from 45 to 64, and 10.2% who were 65 years of age or older. The median age was 42 years. For every 100 females, there were 97.4 males. For every 100 females age 18 and over, there were 101.4 males.

The median income for a household in the township was $74,821, and the median income for a family was $81,279. Males had a median income of $46,161 versus $32,917 for females. The per capita income for the township was $30,069. About 2.7% of families and 2.7% of the population were below the poverty line, including 1.9% of those under age 18 and 3.5% of those age 65 or over.
