= Landfall, Minnesota =

City in the United States

Landfall
- City
- Location of the city of Landfall within Washington County, Minnesota
- Coordinates: 44°57′4″N 92°58′37″W
- Country: United States
- State: Minnesota
- County: Washington

Area
  - Total: 0.081 sq mi (0.21 km^{2})
  - Land: 0.066 sq mi (0.17 km^{2})
  - Water: 0.015 sq mi (0.04 km^{2})
- Elevation: 968 ft (295 m)

Population (2020)
  - Total: 843
  - Density: 12,845.6/sq mi (4,959.73/km^{2})
- Time zone: UTC-6 (Central (CST))
  - Summer (DST): UTC-5 (CDT)
- ZIP code: 55128
- Area code: 651
- FIPS code: 27-35414
- GNIS feature ID: 2395626
- Website: https://cityoflandfall.com/

Landfall is a city in Washington County, Minnesota, United States. The population was 843 at the 2020 census and is the smallest community in Washington County in terms of area. It lies on the eastern shore of Tanner's Lake on Interstate 94.

Landfall is an incorporation of a manufactured home community, contributing to its reputation as the most affordable community in the Twin Cities. In 2008 and 2010, the city was named one of the 100 best communities for young people by America's Promise.

Landfall is one of only two incorporated cities in Minnesota that consist primarily of manufactured housing; the other is the Twin Cities suburb of Hilltop.

== History ==
From 1953 to 1997 all of the land in Landfall was owned by one family. Mobile homes were built on the land after there was a shortage of affordable housing. The city was incorporated in 1959. In the early 1990s a developer attempted to purchase the city for a shopping mall. The Washington County Housing and Redevelopment Authority purchased the land and sold it to the city in 1997. Since then the city has rented mobile home lots to residents. All homes in the city are owner occupied. Rental of mobile homes is prohibited.

== Geography ==
According to the United States Census Bureau, the city has a total area of 0.09 square miles (0.23 km^{2}); 0.07 square miles (0.18 km^{2}) is land and 0.02 square miles (0.05 km^{2}) is water. Interstate Highway 94 serves as a main route in the community. Interstate Highways 494 and 694 are in close proximity to the community. The boundary line between Ramsey and Washington counties is nearby.

== Demographics ==
Historical population
Census	Pop.	Note	%±
1960	437		—
1970	671		53.5%
1980	679		1.2%
1990	685		0.9%
2000	700		2.2%
2010	686		−2.0%
2020	843		22.9%
U.S. Decennial Census

=== 2010 census ===
As of the census of 2010, there were 686 people, 265 households, and 157 families residing in the city. The population density was 9,800.0 inhabitants per square mile (3,783.8/km^{2}), making it the most densely populated city in Minnesota. There were 285 housing units at an average density of 4,071.4 per square mile (1,572.0/km^{2}). The racial makeup of the city was 69.5% White, 2.2% African American, 3.2% Native American, 3.8% Asian, 16.0% from other races, and 5.2% from two or more races. Hispanic or Latino of any race were 25.8% of the population.

There were 265 households, of which 35.8% had children under the age of 18 living with them, 28.7% were married couples living together, 15.8% had a female householder with no husband present, 14.7% had a male householder with no wife present, and 40.8% were non-families. 31.3% of all households were made up of individuals, and 10.2% had someone living alone who was 65 years of age or older. The average household size was 2.59 and the average family size was 3.23.

The median age in the city was 35 years. 28.6% of residents were under the age of 18; 7.3% were between the ages of 18 and 24; 28.2% were from 25 to 44; 27.4% were from 45 to 64; and 8.5% were 65 years of age or older. The gender makeup of the city was 51.3% male and 48.7% female.

=== 2000 census ===
As of the census of 2000, there were 700 people, 292 households, and 167 families residing in the city. The population density was 8,996.8 inhabitants per square mile (3,473.7/km^{2}). There were 300 housing units at an average density of 3,855.8 per square mile (1,488.7/km^{2}). The racial makeup of the city was 89.86% White, 0.43% African American, 2.29% Native American, 1.71% Asian, 0.14% Pacific Islander, 1.29% from other races, and 4.29% from two or more races. Hispanic or Latino of any race were 4.86% of the population.

There were 292 households, out of which 32.5% had children under the age of 18 living with them, 29.5% were married couples living together, 17.8% had a female householder with no husband present, and 42.8% were non-families. 31.8% of all households were made up of individuals, and 6.5% had someone living alone who was 65 years of age or older. The average household size was 2.40 and the average family size was 3.08.

In the city, the population was spread out, with 28.6% under the age of 18, 9.9% from 18 to 24, 34.0% from 25 to 44, 21.1% from 45 to 64, and 6.4% who were 65 years of age or older. The median age was 32 years. For every 100 females, there were 99.4 males. For every 100 females age 18 and over, there were 107.5 males.

The median income for a household in the city was $31,136, and the median income for a family was $35,893. Males had a median income of $28,375 versus $25,500 for females. The per capita income for the city was $15,588. About 20.1% of families and 19.4% of the population were below the poverty line, including 29.6% of those under age 18 and 17.2% of those age 65 or over.
