= St. Croix Flowage =

- Gordon Flowage
- Location within Wisconsin Location within the United States
- Location: Douglas County, Wisconsin
- Coordinates: 46°15′35″N 91°52′43″W
- Type: Reservoir

The St. Croix Flowage, also known as the Gordon Flowage, is a reservoir in Douglas County, Wisconsin, United States. It encompasses 2,247 acres (909 ha), with a maximum depth of 28 feet (8.5 m). The flowage divides the Upper St. Croix River from the Lower St. Croix River. At times it is referred to as the "headwaters" of the St. Croix River.

The Gordon Dam is located at the west end of the flowage, which also contains the Gordon Dam County Park.

At the south end of the flowage begins the portion of the St. Croix River known as the Saint Croix National Scenic Riverway.

== Wildlife ==
The lake's fish including largemouth bass, northern pike, and various panfish. It is also known for its large-sized bowfin fish and bullheads.

The lake is also considered a good place to see black terns, bald eagles, osprey and trumpeter swans.
