= Point Douglas, Minnesota =

Ghost town in Minnesota, United States

Coordinates: 44°45′04″N 92°49′05″W

Point Douglas is a ghost town in section 8 of Denmark Township, Washington County, Minnesota, United States located at the convergence of the St. Croix River and the Mississippi River. It is located across the St Croix River from Prescott, Wisconsin.

== History ==
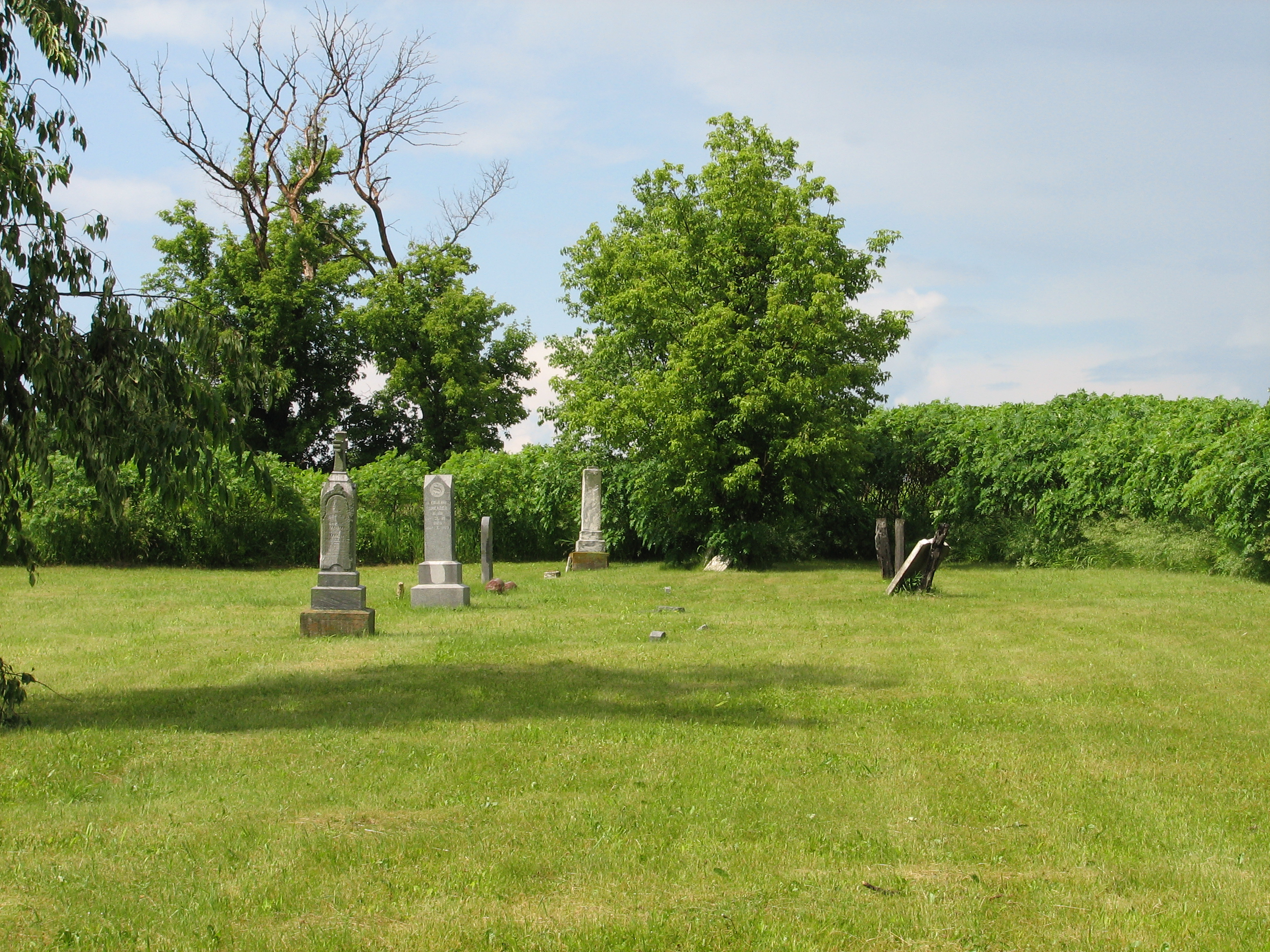
Point Douglas Cemetery dates from 1855.

Point Douglas was platted on August 18, 1849, and named in honor of Stephen A. Douglas. The post office, with Levi Hurtsell as first postmaster, was the first in the County, and was transferred from Wisconsin Territory when Minnesota Territory was created. It was discontinued in 1903. In 1856, the site was a trade center and had a mill, several warehouses, and a lime kiln. The town also had a station of the Chicago, Milwaukee, St. Paul and Pacific Railroad. Today, all that remains of Point Douglas is a small development along U.S. Route 10.
