= Governor Knowles State Forest =

Forest unit

- Location within Wisconsin Location within the United States
- Interactive map of Governor Knowles State Forest
- Location: Wisconsin, United States
- Coordinates: 45°46′27″N 92°46′45″W
- Area: 32,500 acres (13,200 ha)
- Established: 1970
- Named for: Warren P. Knowles
- Visitors: 28,160 (in 2024)
- Administrator: Wisconsin Department of Natural Resources
- Website: Official website
- Wisconsin State Forests

Governor Knowles State Forest is a 32,500 acre unit of the Wisconsin state park system that stretches for 55 miles (89 km) along the St. Croix River. It is managed as a wilderness buffer for the Saint Croix National Scenic Riverway. On the east the state forest is bordered by county forests and two state wildlife areas. Originally called the St. Croix River State Forest, it was renamed in 1981 to honor former Wisconsin governor Warren P. Knowles for his conservation and outdoorsman ethics.
