= Chengwatana State Forest =

State forest in Minnesota, US

- Location within Minnesota

Geography
- Location: Pine and Chisago counties, Minnesota, United States
- Coordinates: 45°50′28″N 92°47′31″W
- Area: 29,039 acres (11,752 ha)

Administration
- Established: 1953
- Authority: Minnesota Department of Natural Resources
- Website: www.dnr.state.mn.us/state_forests/sft00012/index.html

Ecology
- WWF Classification: Western Great Lakes forests
- EPA Classification: Northern Lakes and Forests
- Dominant tree species: Betula papyrifera, Populus tremuloides, Populus grandidentata

The Chengwatana State Forest is a state forest located in Pine and Chisago counties in Minnesota. Its name is derived from the Ojibwe: Zhingwaadena, meaning white-pine town, after the nearby ghost town and township. Eastern White Pine was historically the dominant tree species in the surrounding forest prior to intensive logging at the end of the nineteenth century.

The forest is part of a long corridor of protected areas along the St. Croix River, bordering the Wild River State Park to the south and the Saint Croix State Park to the north. In addition to the St. Croix, the Kettle River and Snake River both run through the park, all historically important as timber floating rivers to sawmills and timber markets downstream. The forest is primarily composed of upland boreal forest surrounded by brushlands and marshes.

Outdoor recreation opportunities include boating, canoe camping, and fishing along the rivers, as well as hunting and picnicking throughout the forest. Trails include cross-country skiing trails, 20 miles (32 km) of equestrian trails, 5 miles (8.0 km) of mountain biking trails, 16 miles (26 km) of both Class I All-terrain vehicle (ATV) and Class II ATV trails, 16 miles (26 km) of off-highway motorcycling trails, as well as 20 miles (32 km) snowmobiling trails.

== See also ==
- List of Minnesota state forests
