= Afton State Park =

State park in Minnesota, United States

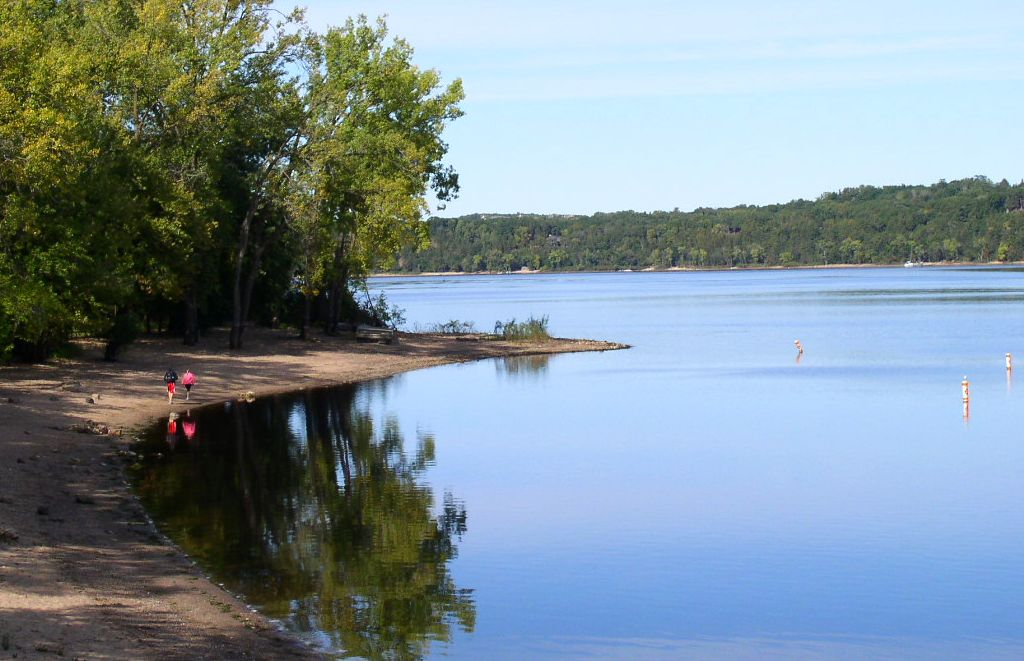
- Afton State Park's swimming area on the St. Croix River

- Location within Minnesota Location within the United States
- Location: Washington, Minnesota, United States
- Coordinates: 44°51′45″N 92°47′1″W
- Area: 1,600 acres (6.5 km^{2})
- Elevation: 938 ft (286 m)
- Established: 1969
- Governing body: Minnesota Department of Natural Resources

Afton State Park

Afton State Park is a state park of Minnesota, USA, on the St. Croix River in Washington County. Its hiking trails offer views of the river, rolling glacial moraine, and bluffland it preserves. It is a popular place for birdwatching, picnics, camping, and other typical outdoor recreational activities. To deter overuse, there is no vehicle access to the camping area or swimming beach.

The park is located approximately five miles (8 km) south of the town of Afton, Minnesota. The park surrounds the unaffiliated privately owned Afton Alps ski area on three sides. The name "Afton" was given to this area by its settlers as a reference to the Robert Burns poem "Afton Water", which is about the River Afton in Scotland.

== Natural history ==
The park lies on a glacial moraine, scribed with deep ravines running down to the St. Croix River. Sandstone outcrops have been exposed in some of the ravines. The vertical drop from the blufftop to the water is 300 feet (91 m).

A few patches of remnant prairie survived the decades of farming that took place on the blufftop. Today the former fields are being restored to prairie and oak savanna. The ravines leading down to the riverbank are thickly wooded with oak, aspen, birch, and cherry.

== Cultural history ==
With William O'Brien State Park growing increasingly crowded in the 1960s, Minnesota was on the lookout for more recreational land near Minneapolis–Saint Paul. Very little state park–caliber land remained, especially along the scenic and well-settled St. Croix River. Therefore, it was a surprise when an undeveloped property directly on the river, containing the last beach on the Minnesota side, went on the market in 1967. Although some of the blufftop had been farmed, the steep ravines had deterred most other development. State park officials and advocacy groups acted quickly and purchased the property the next summer. Many local residents opposed the new state park, fearing the onslaught of visitors it would attract. Resistance continued after the park was authorized by legislation in 1969, and acquisition of property to fill out the park dragged on for thirteen years. Residents did achieve a few key compromises. The park entrance was moved from the north to the west side, snowmobiles were banned, and the road was shortened from its original plan. Thus the camping area and beach are only accessible by hiking. Afton State Park finally opened to the public in 1982, with the visitor center only being completed the following year.

During the 2011 Minnesota state government shutdown, when all state parks were closed, a group of twelve people (eleven adults and one juvenile) were arrested for burglarizing and vandalizing three park buildings; one suspect remained at large.

== Recreation ==
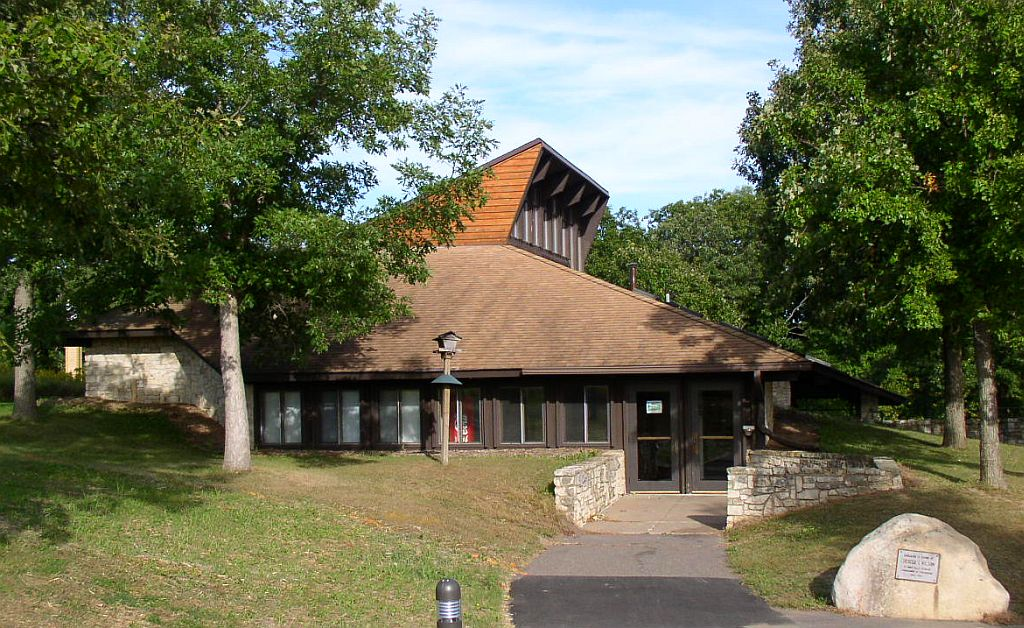
Afton State Park's visitor center

Afton State Park's campground has 28 backpacking sites. The various sites are a .75-to-1.25-mile (1.2 to 2.0 km) hike up a large hill. Firewood and water are provided in the campground. There is also a canoe site off of the St. Croix River open only to paddlers. The park also offers two drive-in group campsites which can each accommodate up to 40 people. In the fall of 2009, Afton opened four new camper cabins that include electricity.

There are more than 20 miles (32 km) of hiking trails in the park. Some of the trails cover the tops of the bluffs, the bluffs themselves, and the floodplain of the St. Croix River. Other trails criss-cross the prairie areas of the park. A four-mile (6.4 km) paved trail open to bicycles extends from the park entrance to the visitor center. Five miles (8 km) of hiking trail are open to horseback riding. In winter 18 miles (29 km) of trail are groomed for cross-country skiing. Many of them are quite challenging as they climb and descend steep hills. Six miles (9.7 km) are maintained for winter hiking and four miles (6.4 km) for snowshoeing. Snowshoers can also trek anywhere in the park, provided they stay off the groomed ski trails.

The park has three picnic areas and one reservable picnic shelters. There is a visitor center with restrooms that has a wood stove for the winter months. There is a swimming beach on the river, and the park provides equipment for volleyball and horseshoes.

=== Trout Brook ===
Trout Brook is a cold water stream that flows through Afton State Park. It is a tributary of the St. Croix River. Restoration efforts, beginning in 2019, endeavored to improve the environment for trout and other cold water species. As of 2023, there were 150 to 1100 fish per mile in Trout Brook.
