= Afton, Minnesota =

City in Minnesota, United States

- City
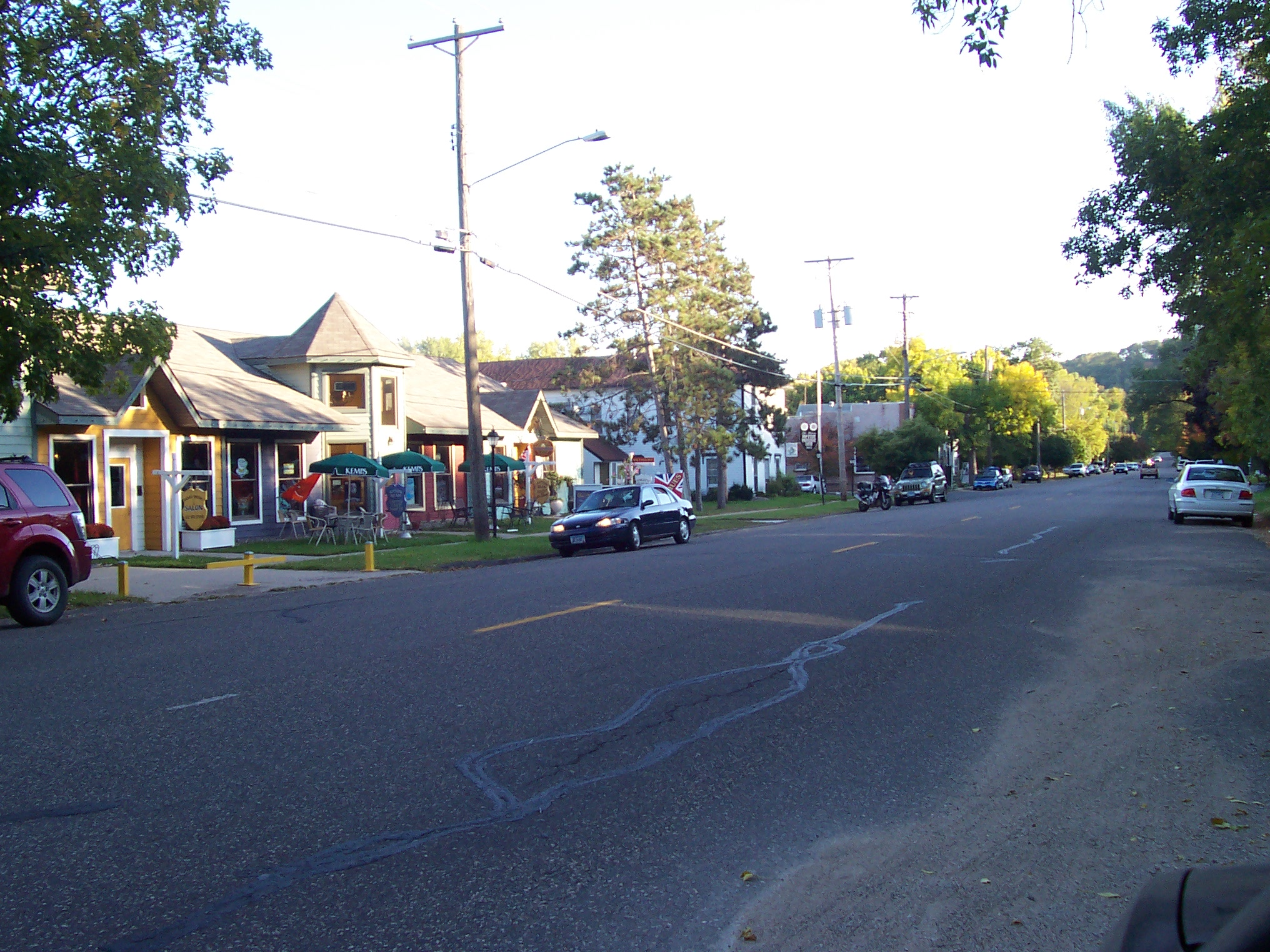
- Downtown Afton

- Location of the city of Afton within Washington County, Minnesota

- Location within Minnesota Location within the United States Location within North America
- Coordinates: 44°54′10″N 92°47′0″W
- Country: United States
- State: Minnesota
- County: Washington
- Established: 1837 (settled); 1855 (platted)

Area
  - Total: 26.48 sq mi (68.59 km^{2})
  - Land: 25.09 sq mi (64.99 km^{2})
  - Water: 1.39 sq mi (3.60 km^{2})
- Elevation: 974 ft (297 m)

Population (2020)
  - Total: 2,955
  - Density: 117.8/sq mi (45.47/km^{2})
- Time zone: UTC−6 (Central)
  - Summer (DST): UTC−5 (CDT)
- ZIP Code: 55001
- Area code: 651
- FIPS code: 27-00316
- GNIS feature ID: 2393887
- Website: https://aftonmn.gov/

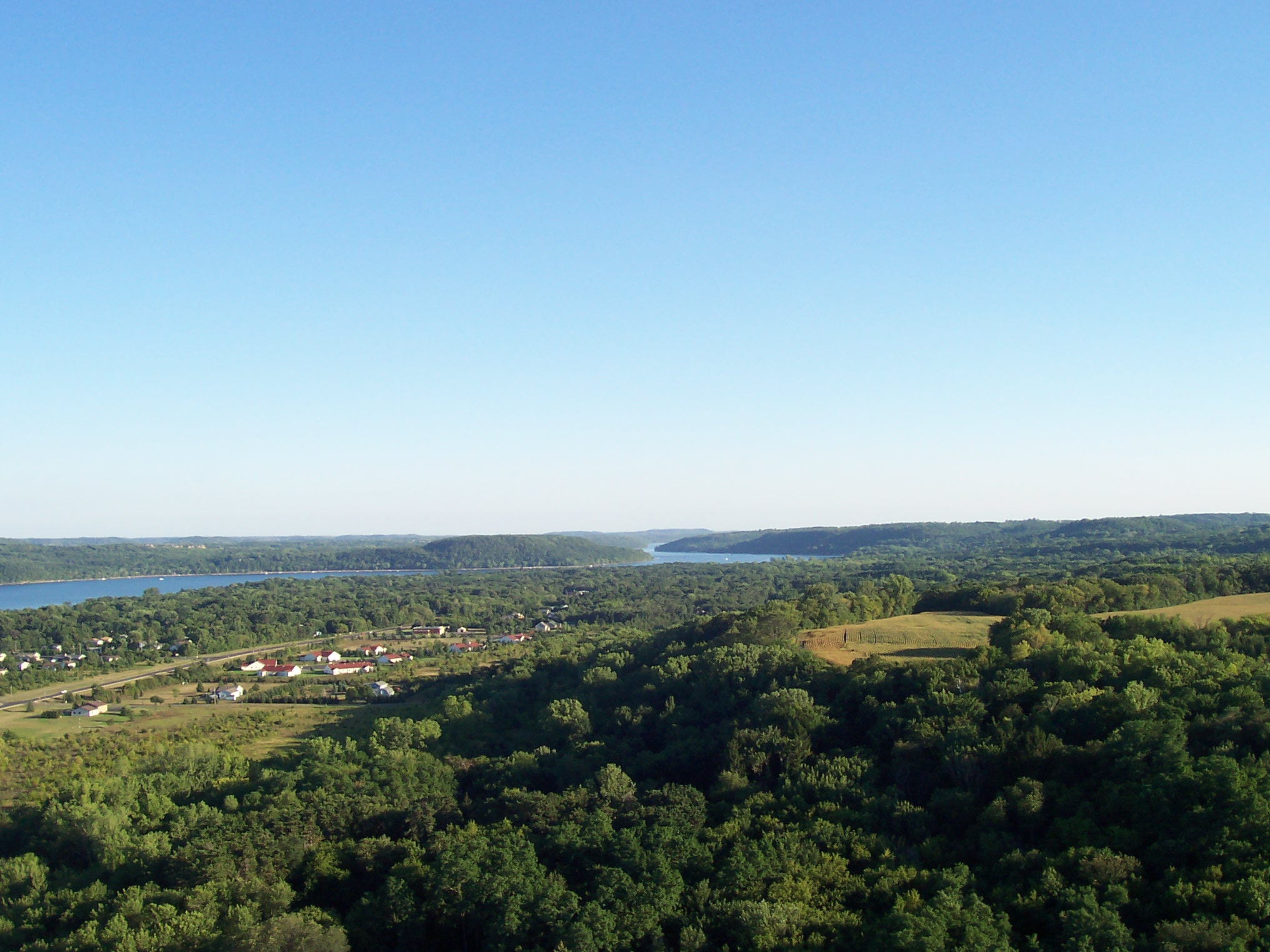
View of St. Croix Valley above Afton

Afton (/ˈæftən/ AF-tən) is a city in Washington County, Minnesota, United States. The population was 2,955 at the 2020 United States census. It lies on a small bay where Valley Creek empties into the St. Croix River, several miles north of its confluence with the Mississippi River.

Afton is well known for Afton Alps, the largest ski and snowboard area in the Twin Cities metropolitan area. It is home to Afton State Park on the St. Croix River. Due to these two destinations and its quaint small-town appearance in a major metropolitan area, Afton receives a fair amount of local tourism in the form of day trips. The 2018 US Winter Olympic Gold Medalist cross-country skier Jessie Diggins is from Afton.

== History ==
The first settlers in the area arrived in 1837. The settlement of Afton was platted in 1855, with the name chosen from a poem (Sweet Afton) by Robert Burns. A post office has been in operation at Afton since 1857. The city contains three properties listed on the National Register of Historic Places: the 1856 Erastus Bolles House, the 1864 Newington Gilbert House, and the 1867 Cushing Hotel.

== Geography ==
The city has a total area of 26.42 square miles (68.43 km^{2}); 25.05 square miles (64.88 km^{2}) is land and 1.37 square miles (3.55 km^{2}) is water. Main routes include Hudson Road, County Roads 18, 21, and 71; and Minnesota Highway 95. Afton borders Lake St. Croix Beach, Lakeland, and St. Mary's Point to the east. It also borders West Lakeland Township to the north, Denmark Township to the south, and Woodbury to the west.

== Demographics ==
Presidential election results

Precinct General Election Results
Year	Republican	Democratic	Third parties
2020	43.0% 946	55.4% 1,218	1.6% 35
2016	43.9% 878	49.2% 984	6.9% 137
2012	49.7% 1,021	48.6% 998	1.7% 35
2008	46.3% 950	52.2% 1,071	1.5% 30
2004	46.6% 938	52.0% 1,047	1.4% 27
2000	46.9% 844	45.2% 813	7.9% 142
1996	38.7% 653	46.7 789	14.6% 246
1992	28.8% 520	41.0% 742	30.2% 545
1988	52.3% 788	44.9% 676	2.8% 42
1984	55.6% 785	42.6% 602	1.8% 25
1980	48.4% 672	37.3% 517	14.3% 198
1976	50.7% 650	45.3% 580	4.0% 51
1968	55.6% 431	39.5% 306	4.9% 38
1964	46.9% 305	51.0% 332	2.1% 14
1960	61.6% 352	35.9% 205	2.5% 14

Historical population
Census	Pop.	Note	%±
1880	130		—
1920	183		—
1930	148		−19.1%
1940	132		−10.8%
1950	142		7.6%
1960	158		11.3%
1970	248		57.0%
1980	2,550		928.2%
1990	2,645		3.7%
2000	2,839		7.3%
2010	2,886		1.7%
2020	2,955		2.4%
US Decennial Census

=== 2020 census ===
As of the 2020 census, Afton had a population of 2,955. The median age was 50.2 years. 20.2% of residents were under the age of 18 and 24.4% of residents were 65 years of age or older. For every 100 females there were 100.6 males, and for every 100 females age 18 and over there were 99.2 males age 18 and over.

0.0% of residents lived in urban areas, while 100.0% lived in rural areas.

There were 1,091 households in Afton, of which 27.1% had children under the age of 18 living in them. Of all households, 71.8% were married-couple households, 11.4% were households with a male householder and no spouse or partner present, and 11.5% were households with a female householder and no spouse or partner present. About 14.9% of all households were made up of individuals and 7.7% had someone living alone who was 65 years of age or older.

There were 1,170 housing units, of which 6.8% were vacant. The homeowner vacancy rate was 1.1% and the rental vacancy rate was 9.0%.

Racial composition as of the 2020 census
Race	Number	Percent
White	2,608	88.3%
Black or African American	23	0.8%
American Indian and Alaska Native	10	0.3%
Asian	136	4.6%
Native Hawaiian and Other Pacific Islander	2	0.1%
Some other race	36	1.2%
Two or more races	140	4.7%
Hispanic or Latino (of any race)	88	3.0%

=== 2010 census ===
As of the 2010 United States census, there were 2,886 people, 1,081 households, and 863 families in the city. The population density was 115/sqmi (44.4/km^{2}). There were 1,143 housing units at an average density of 45.6/sqmi (17.6/km^{2}). The racial makeup of the city was 93.3% White, 0.7% African American, 0.4% Native American, 4.3% Asian, 0.1% Pacific Islander, 0.6% from other races, and 0.7% from two or more races. Hispanic or Latino of any race were 1.7% of the population.

There were 1,081 households, of which 29.1% had children under the age of 18 living with them, 72.5% were married couples living together, 4.5% had a female householder with no husband present, 2.8% had a male householder with no wife present, and 20.2% were non-families. 15.6% of all households were made up of individuals, and 5.4% had someone living alone who was 65 years of age or older. The average household size was 2.67 and the average family size was 2.98.

The median age in the city was 48.2 years. 21.4% of residents were under the age of 18; 6.6% were between the ages of 18 and 24; 16.1% were from 25 to 44; 42.1% were from 45 to 64; and 14% were 65 years of age or older. The gender makeup of the city was 50.0% male and 50.0% female.

=== 2000 census ===
As of the 2000 United States census, there were 2,839 people, 996 households, and 833 families residing in the city. The population density was 113/sqmi (43.7/km^{2}). There were 1,027 housing units at an average density of 40.9/sqmi (15.8/km^{2}). The racial makeup of the city was 96.65% White, 0.25% African American, 1.02% Asian, 0.39% from other races, and 1.69% from two or more races. Hispanic or Latino of any race were 0.95% of the population.

There were 996 households, out of which 37.3% had children under the age of 18 living with them, 75.5% were married couples living together, 5.1% had a female householder with no husband present, and 16.3% were non-families. 12.6% of all households were made up of individuals, and 3.6% had someone living alone who was 65 years of age or older. The average household size was 2.85 and the average family size was 3.11.

The city population contained 26.8% under the age of 18, 5.6% from 18 to 24, 23.7% from 25 to 44, 35.5% from 45 to 64, and 8.3% who were 65 years of age or older. The median age was 42 years. For every 100 females, there were 98.3 males. For every 100 females age 18 and over, there were 97.6 males.

The median income for a household in the city was $89,095, and the median income for a family was $96,087. Males had a median income of $64,135 versus $37,300 for females. The per capita income for the city was $36,338. None of the families and 0.6% of the population were living below the poverty line, including no under eighteens and none of those over 64.

== Culture ==
=== Luther Seminary (1884 - 1893) ===
Beginning in 1884, Luther Seminary, a lutheran seminary in the Evangelical Lutheran Joint Synod of Ohio, was located in Afton. Originally located in Columbus, Ohio, the Ohio synod seminary suffered low enrollment rates in the 1880s. Luther Seminary was then founded with the purpose of teaching German immigrant pastors in their native German language, so that they would be able to attain bachelor of arts degrees and master biblical and classical languages. Pastors were required to take a three-year preparatory program, which included high school subjects like U.S. history and geography, and two years at the formal seminary, which featured just theological instruction. The seminary floundered financially, operating on a shoestring budget and overworking its few professors. In 1893, the building became overcrowded and moved to Saint Paul.

== Notable people ==
- Jacob Fahlstöm, first Swedish settler in Minnesota and Methodist lay preacher
- Margaret Bonga Fahlstrom, Black-Ojibwe woman, instrumental in Jacob Fahlstöm's fur trading
- Jessie Diggins, Olympian cross-country skier
