= Valley Creek (South Dakota) =

Stream in South Dakota

Coordinates: 45°33′06″N 103°57′21″W

Valley Creek is a stream in the U.S. state of South Dakota.

Valley Creek was so named for its location in a valley.

== See also ==
- List of rivers of South Dakota
- List of rivers of the United States
