= Afton Alps =

Ski area in Minnesota, United States

Coordinates: 44°51′20″N 92°47′21″W

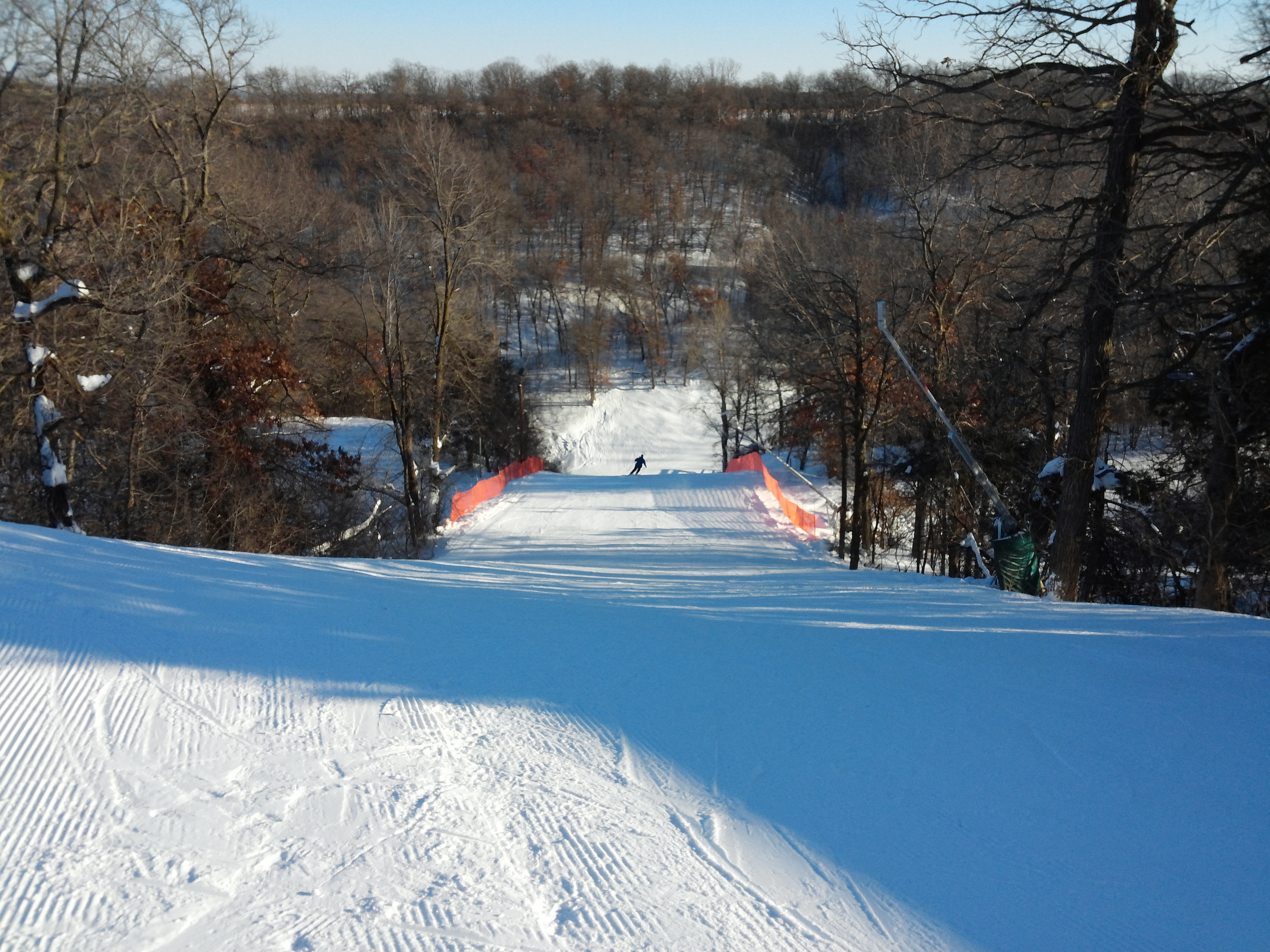
- A run at Afton Alps, 2014
- Interactive map of Afton Alps
- Location: Denmark Township, Washington County
- Nearest major city: Afton, Minnesota
- Status: Operating
- Owner: Vail Resorts
- Vertical: 350 ft (107 m)
- Top elevation: 700 feet (210 m)
- Base elevation: 350 feet (110 m)
- Skiable area: 300 acres (120 ha)
- Trails: 50 total: 25% beginner; 50% intermediate; 25% advanced
- Lift system: 17 chairlifts 4 surface lifts
- Lift capacity: 18,150 people/hr
- Snowmaking: Yes
- Night skiing: Yes
- Website: Afton Alps

Afton Alps is a ski area owned by Vail Resorts which hosts a collection of ski and snowboard trails, located along the St. Croix River in the northeast corner of Denmark Township, Washington County, south of Afton, Minnesota in the United States.

There are nearly 300 acres (1.2 km^{2}) skiable at Afton Alps. The ski hill has 350 feet (110 m) of vertical drop. The Alps utilizes an extensive snowmaking system for maintaining the slopes during the winter months. There are a total of 36 trails with 15 chairlifts, three conveyor lifts (including one tubing lift), and a double-sided rope tow in the Landing Zone Terrain Park. There are five chalets, including the Meadows Chalet, the Highlands Chalet, the Alpine Chalet, Landing Zone (also has a Yurt) and the Alps Chalet (Main Chalet).

== History ==
Brothers Paul and Bob Augustine and fellow farmer Paul Furlong opened Afton Alps on December 21, 1962, after having begun clearing trees just two months earlier in October. Thirty seven people attended on the first day, using tow ropes and one T-bar lift powered by a tractor engine. A chalet came along soon after. Two new chalets were opened in 1968. By 1971, Afton had six chairlifts, the most of any Midwest ski area outside of Michigan. Soon after, by 1974, Afton had three T-bar lifts, 12 chairlifts, and a poma lift. In 1976, Afton claimed over 200,000 visitors annually, who utilized 17 lifts and four chalets which cost $7.50 for a daily lift ticket ($42.43 in 2025).

The Augustine brothers purchase Paul Furlong's share in the 1990s. When Paul Augustine died in 2011, his children John, David, and Amy took over operations.

Afton opened a snow tubing park, with 150 feet of vertical drop along a 1,000-foot run, in December 1997. By 2010, it had 18 chairlifts and 49 trails.

=== Acquisition by Vail Resorts ===
Vail Resorts announced December 6, 2012, their purchase of Afton Alps for $20 million in cash ($28 million in 2025). Vail stated their intention was to focus on building up season passes and customer loyalty at small resorts to entice people to venture to their western offerings. At the time of acquisition, Afton had 28 trails and 18 lifts across slightly less than 300 acres. Vail announced plans to invest $10 million into projects to improve the resort, including 72 new snowmaking machines, a new ski school, and upgrades to the dining areas. Other announced improvements included upgrades to roads, drainage, and technology.
