= Valley Creek (Minnesota) =

River in Minnesota, United States

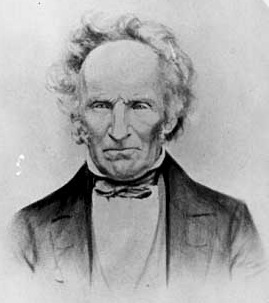
Lemuel Bolles

Valley Creek, sometimes called Bolles Creek, is a small stream in Washington County, Minnesota, United States. It is one of the few remaining trout streams in the Minneapolis-St. Paul metropolitan area. Approximately 10 miles (16 km) long, the stream begins in Woodbury, Minnesota, and flows into the St. Croix River at Afton, Minnesota.

Valley Creek is notable as the location of the first private gristmill in Minnesota. It was built in 1846 by Lemuel Bolles several hundred feet upstream from the confluence with the St. Croix. Bolles' nephew, Erastus Bolles, built an additional mill and a blacksmith shop farther upstream.

== See also ==
- List of Minnesota rivers
