= Saint Croix State Forest =

State forest in Minnesota

- Location within Minnesota

Geography
- Location: Pine County, Minnesota, United States
- Coordinates: 46°02′59″N 92°25′08″W
- Area: 42,153 acres (17,059 ha)

Administration
- Authority: Minnesota Department of Natural Resources
- Website: www.dnr.state.mn.us/state_forests/sft00044/index.html

Saint Croix State Forest is a state forest located in Pine County in Minnesota. About two-thirds of the forest is managed by the Minnesota Department of Natural Resources.

The Lower Tamarack River travels through the forest and flows into the St. Croix River. The St. Croix River itself flows along a part of the forest's eastern border. The southern and southeastern region of the forest mainly consist of aspen trees with occasional red oak and northern hardwoods. The trees common in the western and northwestern areas of the forest include red and white oak, maple, basswood, ash, and birch.

Outdoor recreation includes canoeing and kayaking, camping, hunting, and trails for hiking, cross-country skiing, snowmobiling, horseback riding, riding ATVs, and dog sledding.

== See Also ==
- List of Minnesota State Forests
