= Washington County, Minnesota =

County in Minnesota, United States

- County
- The old Washington County Courthouse

- Logo

- Location within the U.S. state of Minnesota
- Coordinates: 45°02′N 92°53′W
- Country: United States
- State: Minnesota
- Founded: October 27, 1849
- Named for: George Washington
- Seat: Stillwater
- Largest city: Woodbury

Area
  - Total: 423 sq mi (1,100 km^{2})
  - Land: 384 sq mi (990 km^{2})
  - Water: 38 sq mi (98 km^{2}) 9.1%

Population (2020)
  - Total: 267,568
  - Estimate (2025): 286,895 ▲
  - Density: 697/sq mi (269/km^{2})
- Time zone: UTC−6 (Central)
  - Summer (DST): UTC−5 (CDT)
- Congressional districts: 2nd, 4th, 8th
- Website: www.washingtoncountymn.gov

Washington County is a county in the U.S. state of Minnesota. As of the 2020 census, the population was 267,568, making it the fifth-most populous county in Minnesota. Its county seat is Stillwater. The largest city in the county is Woodbury, the seventh-largest city in Minnesota and the third-largest Twin Cities suburb. Washington County is included in the Minneapolis-St. Paul-Bloomington, MN-WI Metropolitan Statistical Area.

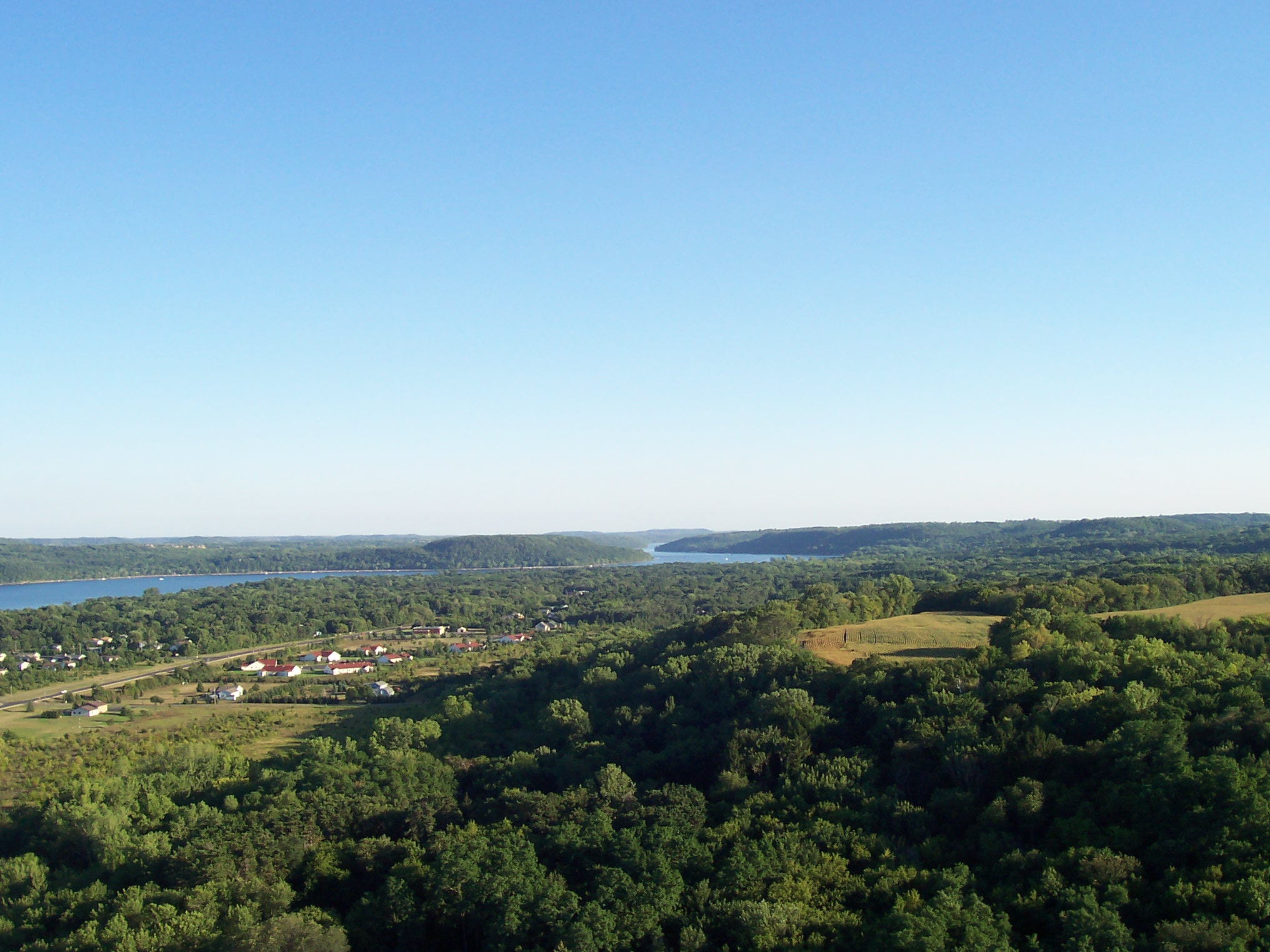
The forested St. Croix River valley, looking south towards Afton

== History ==
Early development in the area was on the St. Croix River, which now forms the boundary with Wisconsin on the county's eastern side. The river provided a waterway to move settlers upstream and to transport logs downstream. The heavily forested area fostered an early logging and lumber economy. The area's first settlers arrived at the future Afton in 1837. In 1838 settlers started Dacotah, at the north edge of present Stillwater, at the junction of Brown's Creek and the St. Croix. The creek's name is from the founder of this settlement, Joseph Renshaw Brown. However, a sawmill was built at Marine-on-St.-Croix in 1839, and another was built in the current location of downtown Stillwater in 1844. The success of these soon attracted the settlers from Dacotah, and that community declined.

This area was part of Wisconsin Territory until the eastern part of that territory achieved statehood in 1848. Brown and other leaders called a meeting (the "Stillwater Convention") on August 26, 1848. The convention drafted a Memorial to Congress that a new territory be created with the name “Minnesota,” and elected Henry Hastings Sibley to deliver this citizens' petition to the U.S. Congress. Because of this convention, Stillwater calls itself the “Birthplace of Minnesota.” Congress responded by creating Minnesota Territory effective March 3, 1849.

The newly established territorial legislature created nine counties across the territory in October 1849. Washington County was one of the nine, named for George Washington, with Stillwater named as county seat. The county's first sheriff was appointed in 1849, and the county's school district began in 1850.

After the forests were depleted, the economy of Washington County became primarily agricultural. With the growth of neighboring Ramsey County and St. Paul, some of Washington County developed based on tourism and recreation, as with Mahtomedi and Landfall. Late in the 20th century, the population greatly increased with the suburban expansion of St. Paul.

== Geography ==
Soils of Washington County

Washington County lies on the east side of Minnesota. Its east border abuts the west border of the state of Wisconsin (across the St. Croix River). The Mississippi River flows south-southeastward west of Washington County, and forms the southwest border of the county as it flows toward its confluence with the St. Croix (at the county's southernmost point). Washington County terrain consists of low rolling hills, sloping to the south and east, with its highest point on the lower west border at 1,053 ft (321 m) ASL. The county has a total area of 423 square miles (1,100 km^{2}), of which 384 square miles (990 km^{2}) is land and 38 square miles (98 km^{2}) (9.1%) is water. It is the fourth-smallest county in Minnesota by land area and fifth-smallest by total area.

=== Major highways ===
- Interstate 35
- Interstate 94
- Interstate 494
- Interstate 694
- US Highway 8
- US Highway 10
- US Highway 12
- US Highway 61
- Minnesota State Highway 36
- Minnesota State Highway 95
- Minnesota State Highway 97
- Minnesota State Highway 120
- Minnesota State Highway 244
- List of county roads

=== Airports ===
- Forest Lake Airport (25D) - south of Forest Lake
- Lake Elmo Airport (21D) - northeast of Lake Elmo

=== Adjacent counties ===
- Chisago County - north
- Polk County, Wisconsin - northeast
- St. Croix County, Wisconsin - east
- Pierce County, Wisconsin - southeast
- Dakota County - southwest
- Ramsey County - west
- Anoka County - northwest

=== Protected areas ===
- Afton State Park
- Big Marine Park Reserve
- Cottage Grove Ravine Regional Park
- Falls Creek Scientific and Natural Area
- Gateway State Trail
- Grey Cloud Dunes Scientific and Natural Area
- Hardwood Creek Wildlife Management Area
- Katherine Abbott Park
- Lake Elmo Park Reserve
- Lost Valley Scientific and Natural Area
- Mississippi National River and Recreation Area (part)
- Pine Point Regional Park
- Point Douglas Park
- Rutstrum State Wildlife Management Area
- Saint Croix Bluffs Regional Park
- Saint Croix National Scenic Riverway (part)
- Saint Croix Savanna Scientific and Natural Area
- Square Lake County Park
- Sunfish Lake Park
- William O'Brien State Park

== Demographics ==
Historical population
Census	Pop.	Note	%±
1850	1,056		—
1860	6,123		479.8%
1870	11,809		92.9%
1880	19,563		65.7%
1890	25,992		32.9%
1900	27,808		7.0%
1910	26,013		−6.5%
1920	23,761		−8.7%
1930	24,753		4.2%
1940	26,430		6.8%
1950	34,544		30.7%
1960	52,432		51.8%
1970	83,003		58.3%
1980	113,571		36.8%
1990	145,896		28.5%
2000	201,130		37.9%
2010	238,136		18.4%
2020	267,568		12.4%
2025 (est.)	286,895	▲	7.2%
U.S. Decennial Census; 1790-1960 1900-1990; 1990-2000 2010-2020

=== 2020 census ===
As of the 2020 United States census, the county had a population of 267,568. The median age was 40.0 years. 24.6% of residents were under the age of 18 and 16.0% of residents were 65 years of age or older. For every 100 females there were 96.8 males, and for every 100 females age 18 and over there were 94.9 males age 18 and over.

The racial makeup of the county was 79.1% White, 5.2% Black or African American, 0.5% American Indian and Alaska Native, 7.0% Asian, <0.1% Native Hawaiian and Pacific Islander, 1.8% from some other race, and 6.3% from two or more races. Hispanic or Latino residents of any race comprised 4.9% of the population.

86.6% of residents lived in urban areas, while 13.4% lived in rural areas.

There were 99,507 households in the county, of which 33.9% had children under the age of 18 living in them. Of all households, 57.7% were married-couple households, 13.6% were households with a male householder and no spouse or partner present, and 22.3% were households with a female householder and no spouse or partner present. About 22.8% of all households were made up of individuals and 10.6% had someone living alone who was 65 years of age or older.

There were 104,014 housing units, of which 4.3% were vacant. Among occupied housing units, 80.1% were owner-occupied and 19.9% were renter-occupied. The homeowner vacancy rate was 1.0% and the rental vacancy rate was 5.4%.

=== Racial and ethnic composition ===
Washington County, Minnesota – Racial and ethnic composition Note: the US Census treats Hispanic/Latino as an ethnic category. This table excludes Latinos from the racial categories and assigns them to a separate category. Hispanics/Latinos may be of any race.
Race / Ethnicity (NH = Non-Hispanic)	Pop 1980	Pop 1990	Pop 2000	Pop 2010	Pop 2020	% 1980	% 1990	% 2000	% 2010	% 2020
White alone (NH)	110,579	140,127	186,133	204,111	208,277	97.37%	96.05%	92.54%	85.71%	77.84%
Black or African American alone (NH)	608	1,548	3,612	8,376	13,799	0.54%	1.06%	1.80%	3.52%	5.16%
Native American or Alaska Native alone (NH)	371	635	747	973	999	0.33%	0.44%	0.37%	0.41%	0.37%
Asian alone (NH)	837	1,626	4,279	12,023	18,530	0.74%	1.11%	2.13%	5.05%	6.93%
Native Hawaiian or Pacific Islander alone (NH)	x	x	59	72	72	x	x	0.03%	0.03%	0.03%
Other race alone (NH)	126	65	157	214	969	0.11%	0.04%	0.08%	0.09%	0.36%
Mixed race or Multiracial (NH)	x	x	2,251	4,240	11,828	x	x	1.12%	1.78%	4.42%
Hispanic or Latino (any race)	1,050	1,895	3,892	8,127	13,094	0.92%	1.30%	1.94%	3.41%	4.89%
Total	113,571	145,896	201,130	238,136	267,568	100.00%	100.00%	100.00%	100.00%	100.00%

=== 2010 census ===
The ethnic makeup of the country, according to the 2010 census, was the following:

- 87.77% White
- 3.60% Black
- 0.49% Native American
- 5.07% Asian
- >0.01% Native Hawaiian or Pacific Islander
- 2.10% Two or more races
- 0.97% Other races
- 3.41% Hispanic or Latino (of any race)

As of the census of 2010, there were 238,136 people, 87,446 households, and 64,299 families in the county. The population density was 620 per square mile (240/km^{2}). There were 87,446 housing units at an average density of 228 per square mile (88/km^{2}). 39.4% were of German, 14.4% Irish, 13.0% Norwegian, and 9.9% Swedish ancestry. There were 87,446 households, out of which 38.6% had children under the age of 18 living with them, 60.6% were married couples living together, 9.5% had a female householder with no husband present, and 26.5% were non-families. 21.5% of all households were made up of individuals, and 7.3% had someone living alone who was 65 years of age or older. The average household size was 2.67 and the average family size was 3.14.

The county population contained 23.5% under the age of 18, 6.2% from 18 to 24, 32.90% from 25 to 44, 28.7% from 45 to 64, and 10.3% who were 65 years of age or older. The median age was 38 years. For every 100 females there were 98.02 males. For every 100 females age 18 and over, there were 97.03 males. The median income for a household in the county was $79,735, and the median income for a family was $92,497. The per capita income for the county was $36,786. About 5.2% of the population was below the poverty line.

According to the 2007-2011 American Community Survey, of the county's population 25 years and over, 1.4% had less than 9th grade education, 2.8% held 9th to 12th grade with no diploma, 23.6% had High school graduate or equivalent, 22.2% held Some college with no degree, 27.0% had bachelor's degree, and 13.0% earned Graduate or professional degree.

=== 2000 ===
As of the census of 2000, there were 201,130 people, 71,462 households, and 54,668 families in the county. The population density was 524 per square mile (202/km^{2}). There were 73,635 housing units at an average density of 192 per square mile (74/km^{2}). The racial makeup of the county was 93.63% White, 1.83% Black or African American, 0.39% Native American, 2.14% Asian, 0.03% Pacific Islander, 0.60% from other races, and 1.37% from two or more races.

There were 71,462 households, out of which 41.60% had children under the age of 18 living with them, 64.80% were married couples living together, 8.50% had a female householder with no husband present, and 23.50% were non-families. 18.70% of all households were made up of individuals, and 5.40% had someone living alone who was 65 years of age or older. The average household size was 2.77 and the average family size was 3.19.

The county population contained 29.40% under the age of 18, 6.80% from 18 to 24, 32.90% from 25 to 44, 23.20% from 45 to 64, and 7.60% who were 65 years of age or older. The median age was 35 years. For every 100 females there were 98.80 males. For every 100 females age 18 and over, there were 96.80 males.

The median income for a household in the county was $66,305, and the median income for a family was $74,576 (these figures had risen to $78,067 and $90,867 respectively as of a 2007 estimate). Males had a median income of $49,815 versus $33,804 for females. The per capita income for the county was $28,148. About 2.00% of families and 2.90% of the population were below the poverty line, including 3.50% of those under age 18 and 4.10% of those age 65 or over.

== Politics and government ==
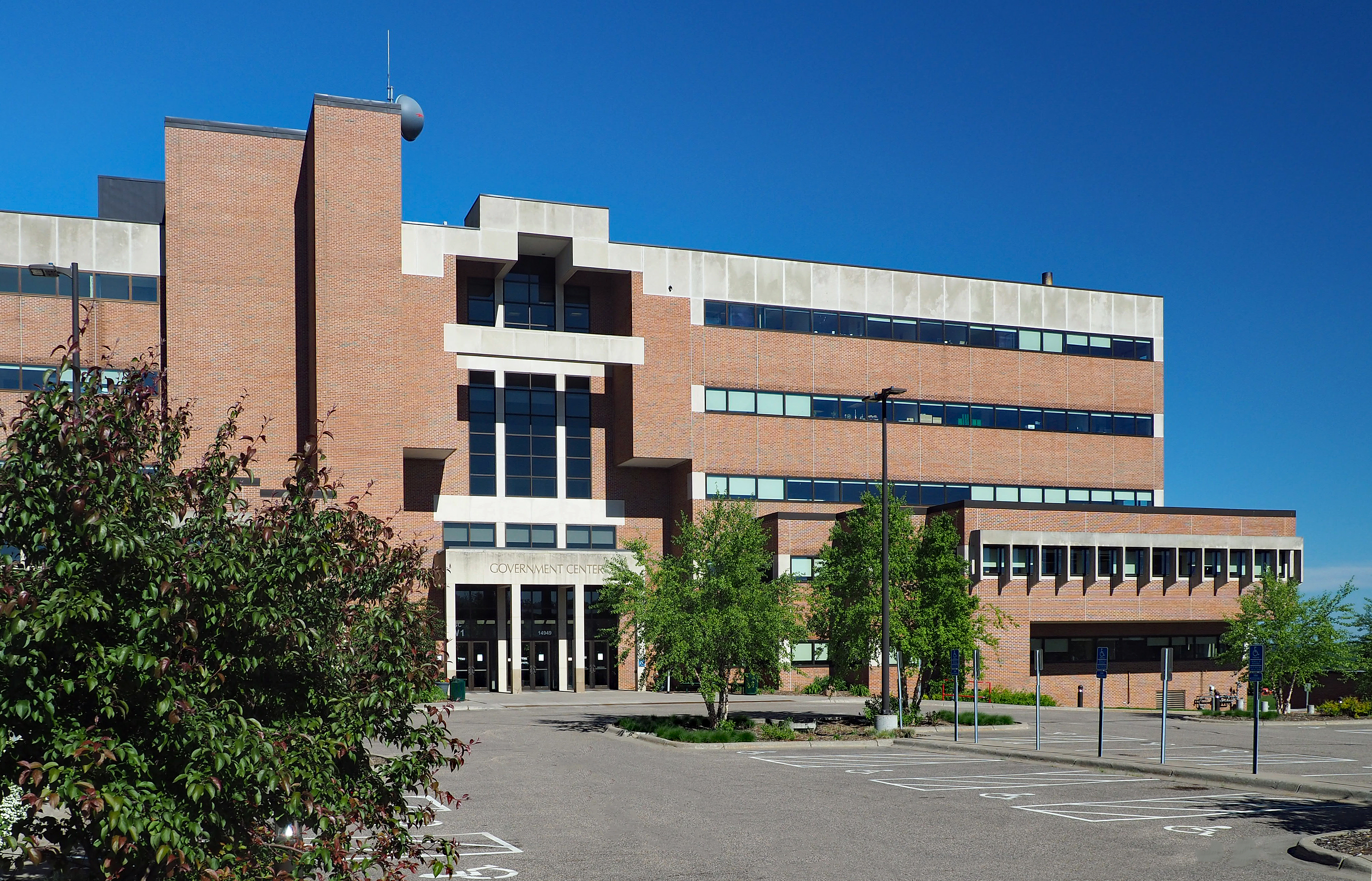
The Washington County Government Center in Stillwater

Washington County voters slightly tend to vote Democratic. In 63% of national elections since 1948, the county selected the Democratic Party candidate (as of 2020). It voted for the national winner in every election from 1992 to 2012.

United States presidential election results for Washington County, Minnesota
Year	Republican		Democratic		Third party(ies)	
Year	No.	%	No.	%	No.	%
1892	2,451	53.31%	1,733	37.69%	414	9.00%
1896	3,995	70.51%	1,558	27.50%	113	1.99%
1900	2,984	68.49%	1,279	29.36%	94	2.16%
1904	2,913	79.94%	652	17.89%	79	2.17%
1908	2,727	68.50%	1,120	28.13%	134	3.37%
1912	581	13.76%	1,289	30.52%	2,353	55.72%
1916	2,167	53.55%	1,610	39.78%	270	6.67%
1920	5,852	74.84%	1,558	19.93%	409	5.23%
1924	4,482	52.40%	699	8.17%	3,372	39.42%
1928	6,113	59.06%	4,158	40.17%	80	0.77%
1932	3,996	37.50%	6,413	60.18%	247	2.32%
1936	3,863	32.99%	6,768	57.80%	1,079	9.21%
1940	6,710	51.41%	6,288	48.18%	54	0.41%
1944	6,014	51.49%	5,599	47.94%	66	0.57%
1948	5,686	40.70%	8,039	57.54%	245	1.75%
1952	9,408	54.57%	7,768	45.06%	64	0.37%
1956	9,562	56.06%	7,462	43.75%	32	0.19%
1960	11,202	48.42%	11,870	51.31%	61	0.26%
1964	8,850	32.75%	18,108	67.01%	64	0.24%
1968	10,921	37.72%	16,449	56.81%	1,584	5.47%
1972	19,142	53.03%	16,102	44.61%	854	2.37%
1976	20,716	42.64%	26,454	54.45%	1,413	2.91%
1980	22,718	41.38%	25,634	46.69%	6,550	11.93%
1984	29,046	50.13%	28,527	49.23%	369	0.64%
1988	30,850	46.45%	34,952	52.63%	613	0.92%
1992	26,568	31.07%	35,820	41.90%	23,111	27.03%
1996	31,219	35.45%	45,119	51.24%	11,719	13.31%
2000	51,502	48.13%	49,637	46.39%	5,870	5.49%
2004	65,751	51.19%	61,395	47.80%	1,303	1.01%
2008	64,334	46.94%	70,277	51.27%	2,448	1.79%
2012	69,137	48.64%	70,203	49.39%	2,793	1.97%
2016	64,428	44.67%	67,086	46.51%	12,721	8.82%
2020	73,764	44.23%	89,165	53.46%	3,857	2.31%
2024	75,271	44.40%	90,324	53.28%	3,941	2.32%

Like all counties in Minnesota, Washington is governed by an elected and nonpartisan board of commissioners. Each commissioner represents a district of approximately equal population.

Washington County is divided among three congressional districts. Northern Washington County is represented by Minnesota's 8th congressional district (CPVI R+7), central Washington County by Minnesota's 4th congressional district (CPVI D+18), and southern Washington County by Minnesota's 2nd congressional district (CPVI D+3).

== Economy ==
=== Largest employers ===
According to the county's 2021 Annual Comprehensive Financial Report, the top employers in the county are:

#	Employer	# of Employees
1	Andersen Corporation (Bayport)	4,939
2	Independent School District 833	2,594
3	Woodwinds Healtheast Campus	1,331
4	Washington County Government	1,324
5	Walmart	1,274
6	Hy-Vee Grocery	1,250
7	Independent School District 834	1,136
8	Independent School District 831	1,074
9	Target Corporation	959
10	Bailey Nurseries, Inc	800

== Points of interest ==
- Afton State Park
- Afton Alps Ski Area
- Gateway State Trail
- William O'Brien State Park
- Tanners Brook Golf Club

== Communities ==
There are 25 incorporated cities fully located in Washington County. According to the 2025 population estimate, the most populous are:

Top 10 most populous cities, 2025 Estimate
City	Population
Woodbury	81,558
Cottage Grove	43,604
Oakdale	30,588
Forest Lake	20,952
Stillwater	19,354
Hugo	17,167
Lake Elmo	14,376
Mahtomedi	8,189
St. Paul Park	5,396
Oak Park Heights	4,782

=== Cities ===
- Afton
- Bayport
- Birchwood Village
- Cottage Grove
- Dellwood
- Forest Lake
- Grant
- Hastings (part)
- Hugo
- Lake Elmo
- Lake St. Croix Beach
- Lakeland
- Lakeland Shores
- Landfall
- Mahtomedi
- Marine on St. Croix
- Newport
- Oak Park Heights
- Oakdale
- Pine Springs
- Saint Marys Point
- Saint Paul Park
- Scandia
- Stillwater (county seat)
- White Bear Lake (partly in Ramsey County)
- Willernie
- Woodbury

=== Unincorporated communities ===
- Arcola
- Basswood Grove
- Carnelian Junction
- Maple Island
- Siegel

=== Ghost towns ===
- Garen
- Point Douglas

=== Townships ===
- Baytown
- Denmark
- Grey Cloud Island
- May
- Stillwater
- West Lakeland

== Education ==
School districts include:

- Chisago Lakes School District
- Forest Lake Public School District
- Hastings Public School District
- Mahtomedi Public School District
- North St. Paul-Maplewood-Oakdale School District
- South Washington County School District
- Stillwater Area Public Schools
- White Bear Lake Area School District

== Superfund sites and environmental damage ==
Washington County has had three locations listed as Environmental Protection Agency Superfund sites due to soil and groundwater contamination. The Baytown Township Ground Water Plume and the Oakdale Dump are currently listed, while the Washington County Landfill was cleaned up and removed from the Superfund list in 1996.

== See also ==
- National Register of Historic Places listings in Washington County, Minnesota
- List of Superfund sites in Minnesota
