= Bellaire, Minnesota =

Bellaire
- Unincorporated community
- Location within Minnesota
- Coordinates: 45°04′11″N 92°59′41″W
- Country: United States
- State: Minnesota
- County: Ramsey County
- Township: White Bear Township
- Elevation: 942 ft (287 m)
- ZIP code: 55110
- Area code: 651
- GNIS feature ID: 639884

Bellaire is an unincorporated community in White Bear Township, Ramsey County, Minnesota, United States.

The community is located on the south shore of White Bear Lake, and is completely surrounded by the cities of White Bear Lake and Birchwood Village.

== See also ==
- Birchwood Village
- White Bear Township
- White Bear Lake
