= White Bear Township, Ramsey County, Minnesota =

White Bear Township, Minnesota
- Township
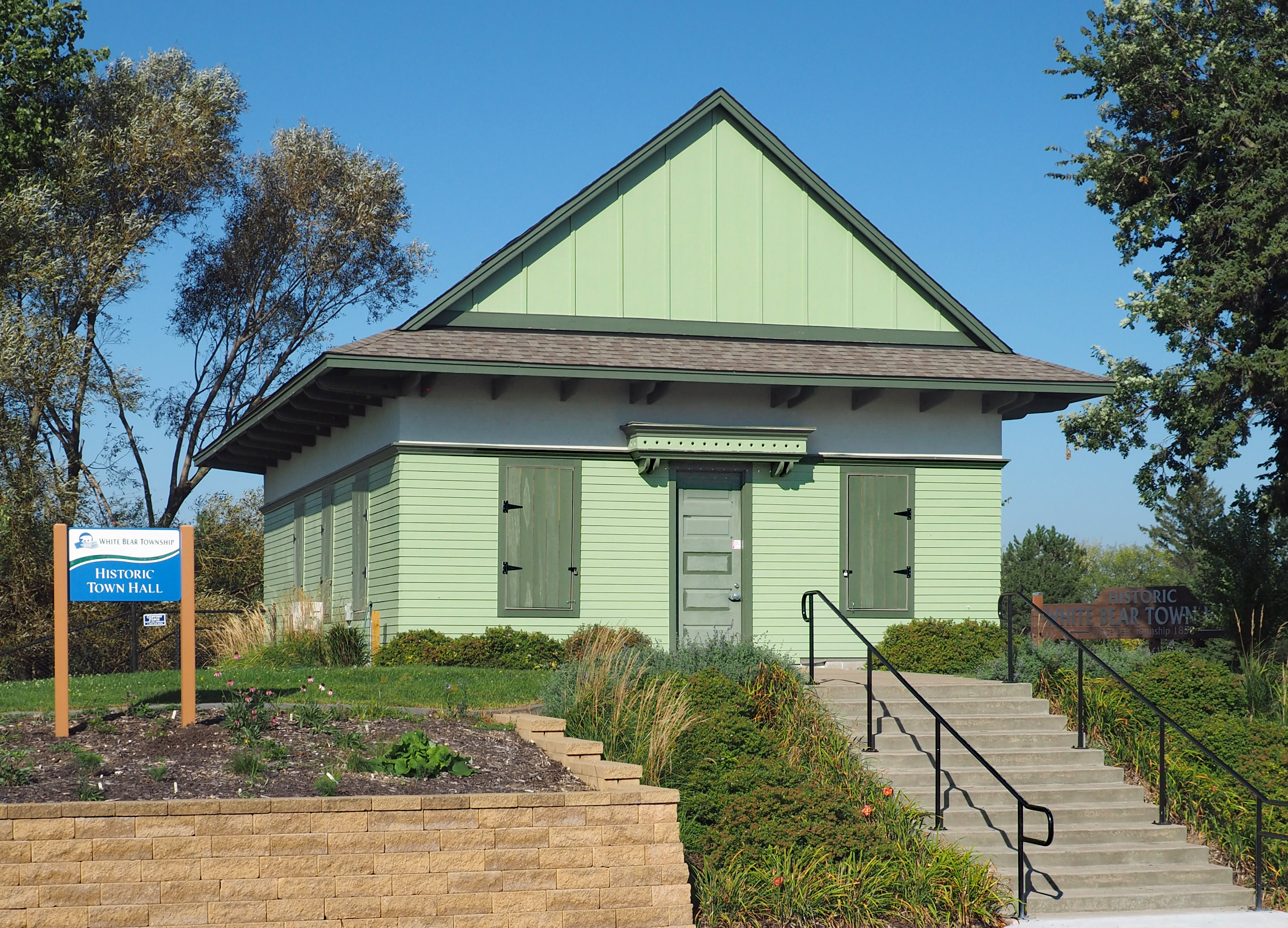
- White Bear Township's 1885 town hall, now a museum

- Logo

- Location within the state of Minnesota White Bear Township, Minnesota (the United States)
- Coordinates: 45°5′46″N 93°1′12″W
- Country: United States
- State: Minnesota
- County: Ramsey
- Organized: 1858

Area
  - Total: 10.8 sq mi (28.1 km^{2})
  - Land: 7.5 sq mi (19.3 km^{2})
  - Water: 3.4 sq mi (8.7 km^{2})
- Elevation: 932 ft (284 m)

Population (2020)
  - Total: 11,049
  - Density: 1,480/sq mi (572/km^{2})
- Time zone: UTC-6 (Central (CST))
  - Summer (DST): UTC-5 (CDT)
- ZIP codes: 55110, 55127
- Area code: 651
- FIPS code: 27-69916
- GNIS feature ID: 0665981
- Website: www.ci.white-bear-township.mn.us

White Bear Township is an urban township in Ramsey County, Minnesota, United States. The population was 11,049 at the 2020 census, up from 10,949 in 2010. White Bear Township was named after its White Bear Lake. Over the years, the cities of White Bear Lake, Vadnais Heights, Gem Lake, and North Oaks were carved out of the township's original 36 square miles (93 km^{2}). It now comprises four discontiguous parcels over an area of 9.3 square miles (24 km^{2}). It is the only remaining township in Ramsey County. The unincorporated communities of Bald Eagle and Bellaire are located in the township.

== History ==
White Bear Township was settled in the 1840s and officially organized in 1858.

== Geography ==
According to the United States Census Bureau, the township has a total area of 10.8 square miles (28 km^{2}), of which 7.5 square miles (19 km^{2}) is land and 3.4 square miles (8.8 km^{2}), or 31.12%, is water. Interstate Highway 35E, U.S. Highway 61, County Highway 96, and State Highway 96 are four of the main routes in the community.

== Demographics ==
Historical population
Census	Pop.	Note	%±
1860	267		—
1870	430		61.0%
1880	700		62.8%
1890	1,087		55.3%
1900	1,018		−6.3%
1910	1,422		39.7%
1920	1,138		−20.0%
1930	2,238		96.7%
1940	3,430		53.3%
1950	7,049		105.5%
1960	6,175		−12.4%
1970	5,666		−8.2%
1980	5,921		4.5%
1990	9,424		59.2%
2000	11,293		19.8%
2010	10,949		−3.0%
2020	11,049		0.9%
U.S. Decennial Census

=== 2010 Census ===
According to the 2010 census, there were 10,949 people, 4,261 households, and 3,225 families residing in the township. The racial makeup of the township was 94.5% White, 0.7% African American, 0.4% Native American, 2.2% Asian, 0.1% Pacific Islander, 0.6% from other races, and 1.5% from two or more races. Hispanic or Latino of any race were 2.4% of the population.

=== 2000 Census ===
As of the census of 2000, there were 11,293 people, 4,010 households, and 3,151 families residing in the township. The population density was 1,513.7 inhabitants per square mile (584.4/km^{2}). There were 4,086 housing units at an average density of 547.7 per square mile (211.5/km^{2}). The racial makeup of the township was 97.14% White, 0.41% African American, 0.22% Native American, 1.20% Asian, 0.02% Pacific Islander, 0.33% from other races, and 0.68% from two or more races. Hispanic or Latino of any race were 1.19% of the population.

There were 4,010 households, out of which 40.8% had children under the age of 18 living with them, 68.2% were married couples living together, 7.7% had a female householder with no husband present, and 21.4% were non-families. 17.2% of all households were made up of individuals, and 5.4% had someone living alone who was 65 years of age or older. The average household size was 2.81 and the average family size was 3.20.

In the township the population was spread out, with 29.0% under the age of 18, 6.9% from 18 to 24, 30.5% from 25 to 44, 25.1% from 45 to 64, and 8.6% who were 65 years of age or older. The median age was 38 years. For every 100 females, there were 98.5 males. For every 100 females age 18 and over, there were 96.1 males.

The median income for a household in the township was $70,000, and the median income for a family was $79,171. Males had a median income of $50,472 versus $35,408 for females. The per capita income for the township was $28,847. About 2.3% of families and 2.8% of the population were below the poverty line, including 2.5% of those under age 18 and 2.7% of those age 65 or over.
