= White Bear Lake (Minnesota) =

Lake in Ramsey and Washington Counties, Minnesota

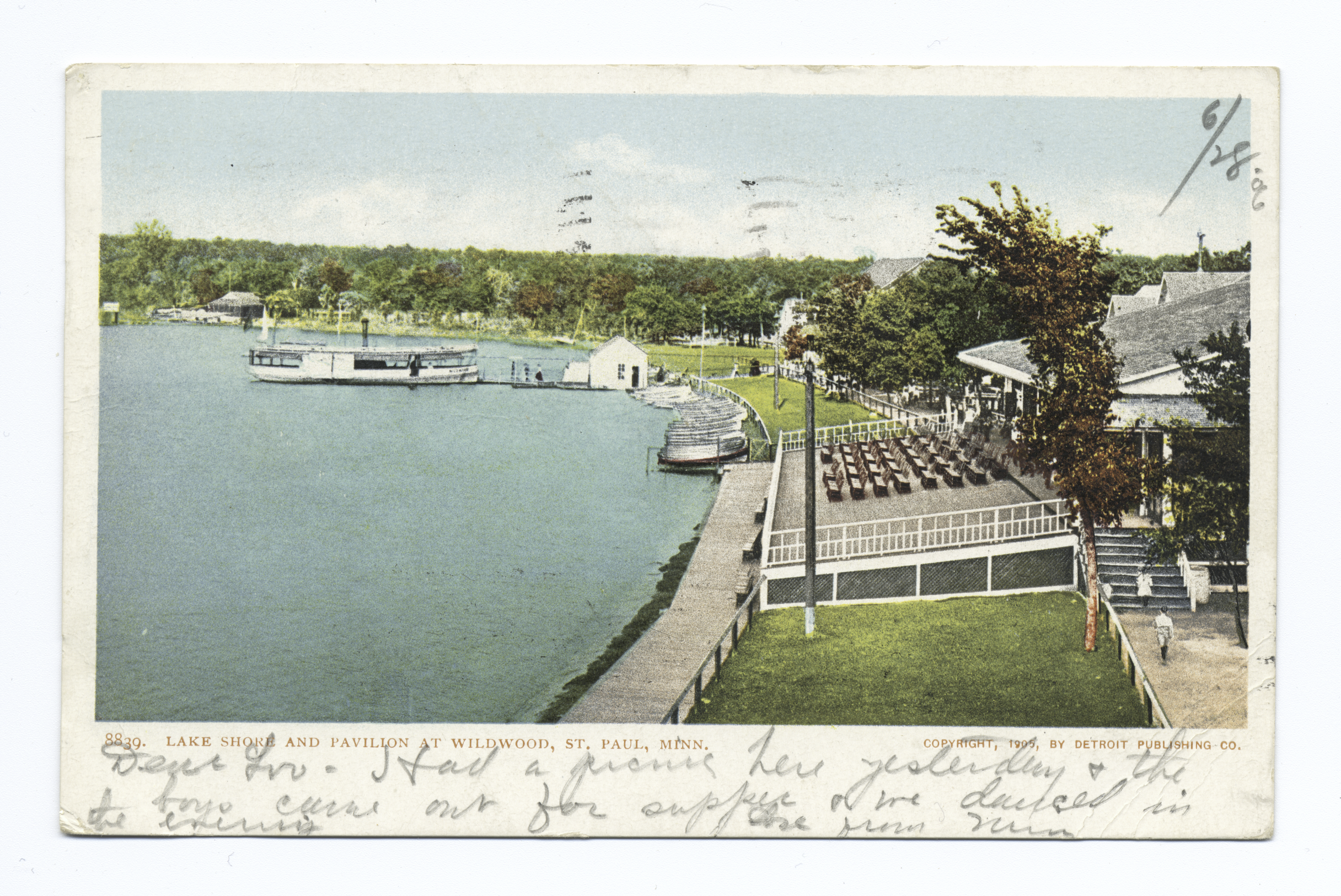
- Wildwood Amusement Park, early 20th century

- Location within Minnesota Location within the United States
- Location: Ramsey / Washington counties, Minnesota, United States
- Coordinates: 45°04′29″N 92°58′41″W
- Basin countries: United States
- Surface area: 2,427.66 acres (982.44 ha)
- Max. depth: 83 feet (25 m)
- Surface elevation: 922 ft (281 m)
- Settlements: Bellaire; Birchwood Village; Dellwood; Mahtomedi; White Bear Lake

White Bear Lake (Dakota: Bde Maṭo Ská) is a lake in northeastern Ramsey County and western Washington County in the U.S. state of Minnesota, in the northeast part of the Minneapolis-St. Paul metropolitan area. The city of White Bear Lake takes its name from the lake.

== History ==
In Life on the Mississippi (1883), American author Mark Twain wrote:

The White-bear Lake is less known. It is a lovely sheet of water, and is being utilized as a summer resort by the wealth and fashion of the State. It has its club-house, and its hotel, with the modern improvements and conveniences; its fine summer residences; and plenty of fishing, hunting, and pleasant drives. There are a dozen minor summer resorts around about St. Paul and Minneapolis, but the White-bear Lake is the resort.

Twain also noted the Native American tradition of maple sugar making on the island in White Bear Lake:

Every spring, for perhaps a century, or as long as there has been a nation of red men, an island in the middle of White-bear Lake has been visited by a band of Indians for the purpose of making maple sugar.

== The Legend of White Bear Lake ==
In 1883, Mark Twain documented a version of The Legend of White Bear Lake which he ridiculed.

In 2016 a musical, The Legend of White Bear Lake, was produced by Youth Music Theatre UK and produced at the Barbican Theatre, Plymouth, England. Book music and lyrics were by Caroline Wigmore and Jennifer Green. The musical told the tale of the white bear after whom the lake is named.

== Water level ==
The lake's surface elevation has fluctuated over time, with a recorded high of 926.7 feet (282.5 m) above mean sea level in June 1943, and a recorded low of 918.8 feet (280.1 m) in January 2013, with significant high and low periods throughout. In November 2012, the White Bear Lake Restoration Association and the White Bear Lake Homeowners Association filed a lawsuit against the Minnesota Department of Natural Resources, claiming that the DNR allowed overuse of groundwater resources around White Bear Lake, leading to a long-term decline in lake levels. The DNR is currently under court orders requiring it to limit issuing groundwater use permits within 5 miles (8.0 km) of the lake, and to identify further steps to manage groundwater use in the lake's watershed. A deal was proposed in 2023 to spend $3 million to study solutions for White Bear Lake's water level, particularly the reliance of nearby growing suburban communities on groundwater as a source, rather than the Mississippi river.
