= Bald Eagle, Minnesota =

- Unincorporated community
- Etymology: Bald Eagle Lake
- Location within Minnesota Location within the United States
- Coordinates: 45°06′07″N 93°00′50″W
- Country: United States
- State: Minnesota
- County: Ramsey County
- Township: White Bear Township
- Elevation: 909 ft (277 m)
- Time zone: UTC-6 (Central (CST))
  - Summer (DST): UTC-5 (CDT)
- Area code: 651
- GNIS feature ID: 639592

Bald Eagle is an unincorporated community in White Bear Township, Ramsey County, Minnesota, United States. The community took its name from nearby Bald Eagle Lake.
