= Falcon Heights, Minnesota =

City in Minnesota, United States

- City
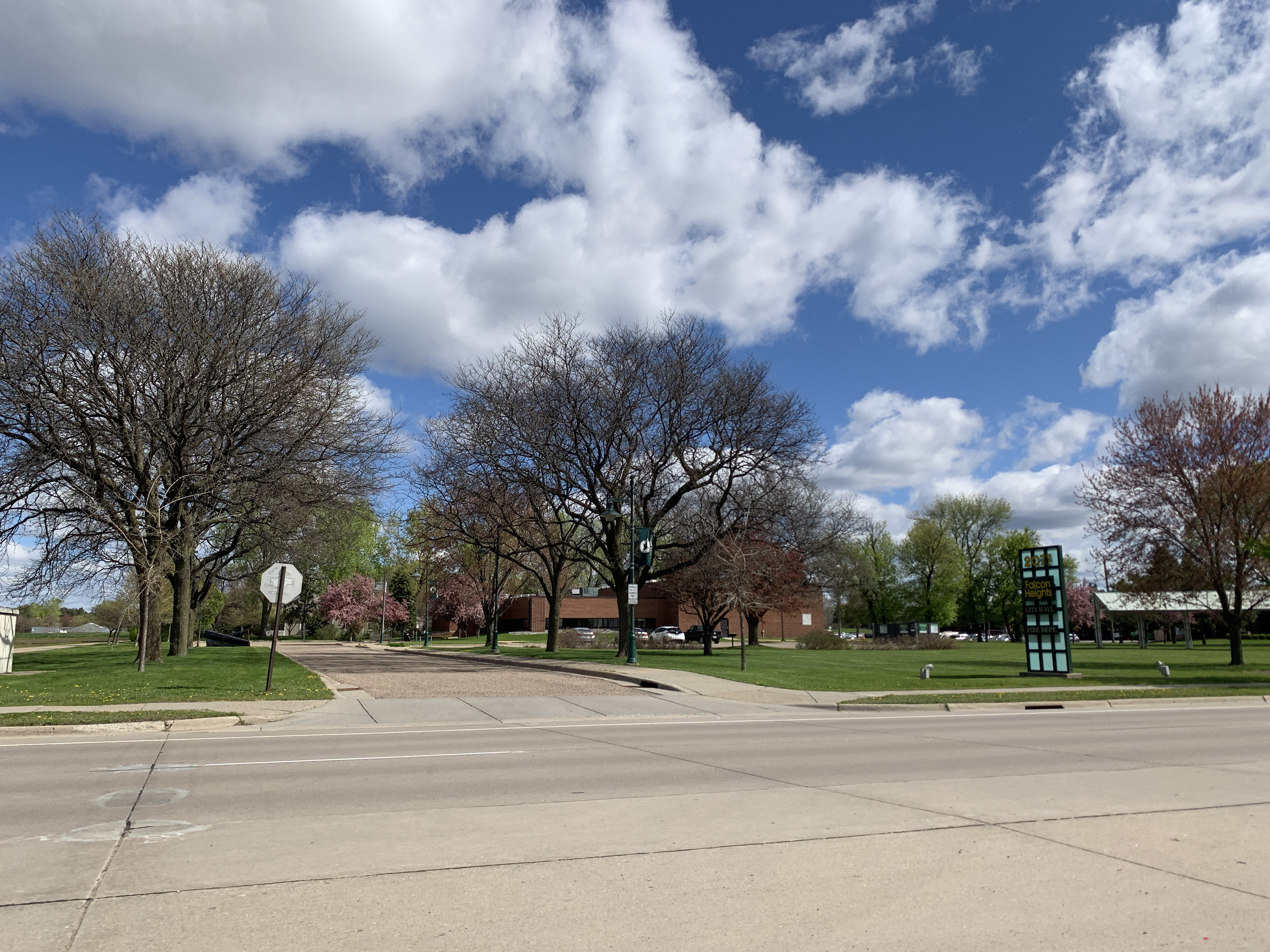
- Falcon Heights City Hall

- Logo
- Motto: "The City That Soars"
- Location of Falcon Heights in Ramsey County, Minnesota

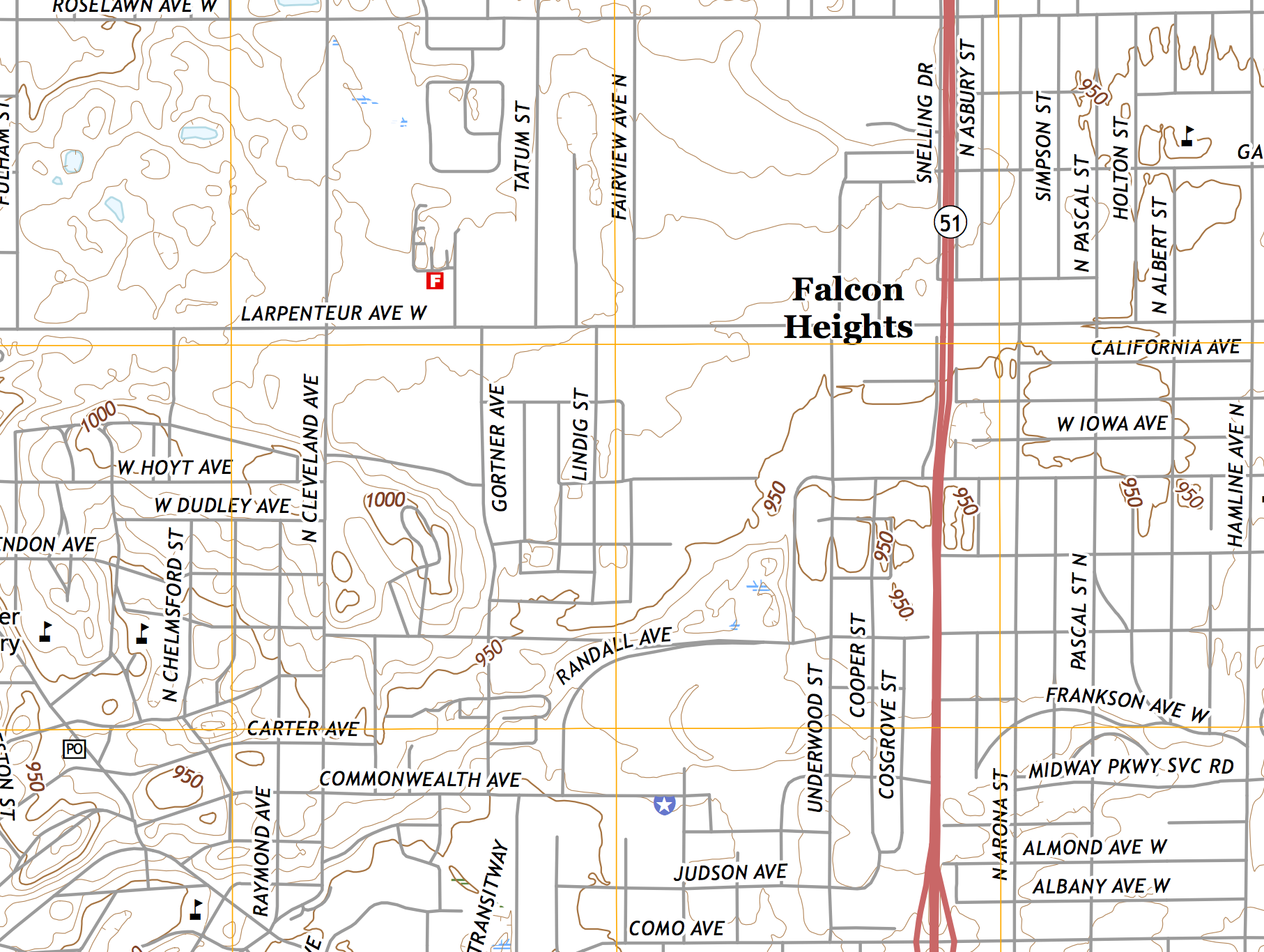
- Falcon Heights on The National Map
- Coordinates: 44°59′24″N 93°10′37″W
- Country: United States
- State: Minnesota
- County: Ramsey
- Settled: 1843
- Incorporated (village): April 1, 1949
- Incorporated (city): 1973

Government
  - Mayor: Randy Gustafson
  - City manager: Jack Linehan
  - Councilmembers: Georgiana May; Eric Meyer; Jim Wassenberg; Paula Mielke

Area
  - Total: 2.240 sq mi (5.802 km^{2})
  - Land: 2.233 sq mi (5.783 km^{2})
  - Water: 0.0073 sq mi (0.019 km^{2})
- Elevation: 961 ft (293 m)

Population (2020)
  - Total: 5,369
  - Estimate (2023): 4,984
  - Density: 2,232/sq mi (861.8/km^{2})
- Time zone: UTC–6 (Central (CST))
  - Summer (DST): UTC–5 (CDT)
- ZIP Codes: 55108, 55113
- Area codes: 651; 612 (U of M campus only)
- FIPS code: 27-20420
- GNIS feature ID: 2394738
- Sales tax: 8.375%
- Website: falconheights.org

Falcon Heights is a suburb of Saint Paul and a city in Ramsey County, Minnesota, United States. The population was 5,369 at the 2020 census. It became a village on April 1, 1949, and a city in 1973.

Falcon Heights is the home of the University of Minnesota's St. Paul Campus, including its Goldstein Museum of Design, Gabbert Raptor Center, and Les Bolstad Golf Course. It is also home to the Minnesota State Fairgrounds and the Gibbs Museum of Pioneer and Dakotah Life. Its University Grove neighborhood is known for its modern architecture.

== History ==
Heman Gibbs settled in the 1850s near the modern intersection of Cleveland and Larpenteur Avenues. His homestead is on the National Register of Historic Places and his home is a county museum.

On September 2, 1901, then-Vice President Theodore Roosevelt first publicly used the African proverb "Speak softly and carry a big stick" in a speech at the Minnesota State Fairgrounds, which was still a part of St. Paul at the time. Roosevelt became president just two weeks later, upon the assassination of William McKinley, and built the phrase into his concept of Big Stick Diplomacy.

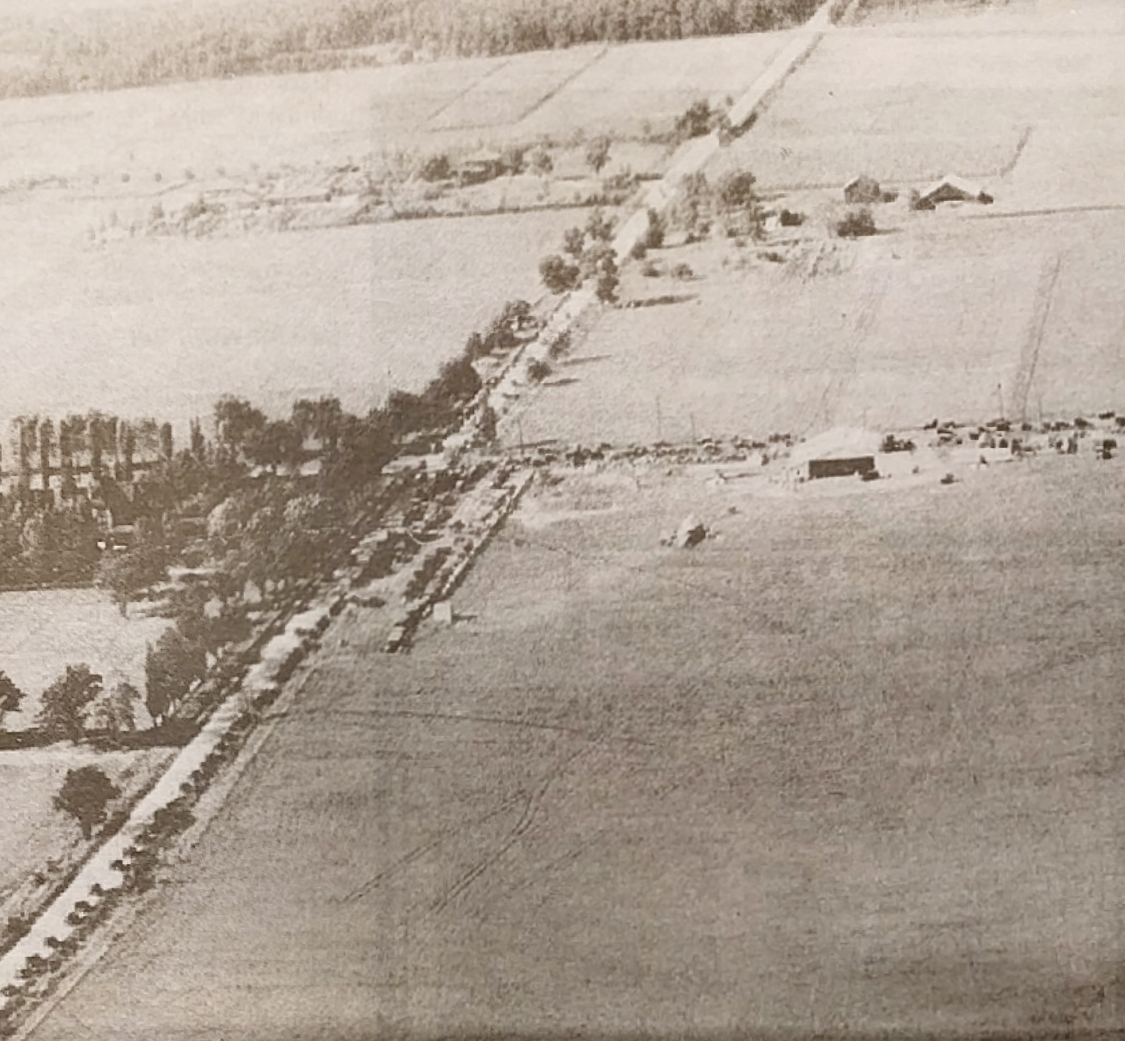
Snelling and Larpenteur Avenues in 1920

Between the 1910s and 1930s, Curtiss Northwest Airport was located at the intersection of Snelling and Larpenteur Avenues. The airfield was important in Minnesota aviation history, hosting Charles Lindbergh, Speed Holman, and Phoebe Fairgrave. Part of the land is now a city park named Curtiss Field.

In the 1930s, a real estate agent named Faulkner developed land owned by a 3M executive and named this development—Falcon Heights—after himself. The first house arose in 1937.

In 1949 residents rejected annexation by Roseville or St. Paul, and voted to incorporate themselves. The expanded Falcon Heights included the University of Minnesota Golf Course and Test Fields as well as the Minnesota State Fairgrounds. Two-thirds of Falcon Heights is public land, chiefly the university and state fair (Minnesota State Fair).

== Parks ==
Falcon Heights Community Park and Curtiss Field have recreational sports in the summer for kids and an ice rink and warming house in the winter. The community park also has a soccer field and a fitness course. Grove Park, in University Grove, also has a temporary warming house and ice rink in the winter.

== Geography ==
According to the United States Census Bureau, the city has a total area of 2.240 square miles (5.80 km^{2}), of which 2.233 square miles (5.78 km^{2}) is land and 0.007 square miles (0.02 km^{2}) is water.

Minnesota Highway 51 / Snelling Avenue serves as a main route in the community.

Falcon Heights is bordered by Lauderdale to the west, St. Paul to the south and east and Roseville to the north and east.

=== Climate ===
Climate data for University of Minnesota St. Paul (1991–2020 normals, extremes 1963–present)
Month	Jan	Feb	Mar	Apr	May	Jun	Jul	Aug	Sep	Oct	Nov	Dec	Year
Record high °F (°C)	55 (13)	62 (17)	82 (28)	91 (33)	100 (38)	101 (38)	105 (41)	105 (41)	95 (35)	90 (32)	77 (25)	67 (19)	105 (41)
Mean maximum °F (°C)	42.0 (5.6)	46.4 (8.0)	63.0 (17.2)	77.9 (25.5)	87.5 (30.8)	92.2 (33.4)	92.8 (33.8)	91.0 (32.8)	87.4 (30.8)	80.2 (26.8)	61.9 (16.6)	46.2 (7.9)	95.1 (35.1)
Mean daily maximum °F (°C)	21.2 (−6.0)	26.5 (−3.1)	39.4 (4.1)	54.7 (12.6)	67.1 (19.5)	77.2 (25.1)	81.4 (27.4)	79.1 (26.2)	71.3 (21.8)	57.3 (14.1)	40.1 (4.5)	26.4 (−3.1)	53.5 (11.9)
Daily mean °F (°C)	13.3 (−10.4)	17.9 (−7.8)	30.9 (−0.6)	45.2 (7.3)	57.7 (14.3)	67.9 (19.9)	72.1 (22.3)	69.8 (21.0)	61.8 (16.6)	48.1 (8.9)	32.6 (0.3)	19.5 (−6.9)	44.7 (7.1)
Mean daily minimum °F (°C)	5.5 (−14.7)	9.4 (−12.6)	22.3 (−5.4)	35.6 (2.0)	48.2 (9.0)	58.5 (14.7)	62.8 (17.1)	60.5 (15.8)	52.2 (11.2)	38.9 (3.8)	25.2 (−3.8)	12.5 (−10.8)	36.0 (2.2)
Mean minimum °F (°C)	−15.4 (−26.3)	−10.2 (−23.4)	0.9 (−17.3)	20.9 (−6.2)	34.4 (1.3)	45.4 (7.4)	52.4 (11.3)	50.1 (10.1)	36.2 (2.3)	24.5 (−4.2)	8.9 (−12.8)	−8.2 (−22.3)	−17.8 (−27.7)
Record low °F (°C)	−30 (−34)	−32 (−36)	−18 (−28)	1 (−17)	23 (−5)	36 (2)	44 (7)	39 (4)	26 (−3)	15 (−9)	−15 (−26)	−27 (−33)	−32 (−36)
Average precipitation inches (mm)	0.68 (17)	0.75 (19)	1.61 (41)	3.02 (77)	4.23 (107)	4.60 (117)	4.55 (116)	4.52 (115)	3.29 (84)	2.89 (73)	1.53 (39)	1.06 (27)	32.73 (831)
Average snowfall inches (cm)	8.3 (21)	12.3 (31)	4.0 (10)	2.1 (5.3)	0.0 (0.0)	0.0 (0.0)	0.0 (0.0)	0.0 (0.0)	0.0 (0.0)	0.5 (1.3)	3.0 (7.6)	10.2 (26)	40.4 (103)
Average precipitation days (≥ 0.01 in)	7.0	5.8	8.5	10.4	13.1	12.7	11.3	10.8	10.9	10.4	7.1	7.5	115.5
Average snowy days (≥ 0.1 in)	4.2	3.6	2.2	1.1	0.1	0.0	0.0	0.0	0.0	0.4	1.8	4.2	17.6
Source: NOAA

== Demographics ==
Historical population
Census	Pop.	Note	%±
1950	3,884		—
1960	5,927		52.6%
1970	5,530		−6.7%
1980	5,291		−4.3%
1990	5,380		1.7%
2000	5,572		3.6%
2010	5,321		−4.5%
2020	5,369		0.9%
2023 (est.)	4,984		−7.2%
U.S. Decennial Census; 2020 Census

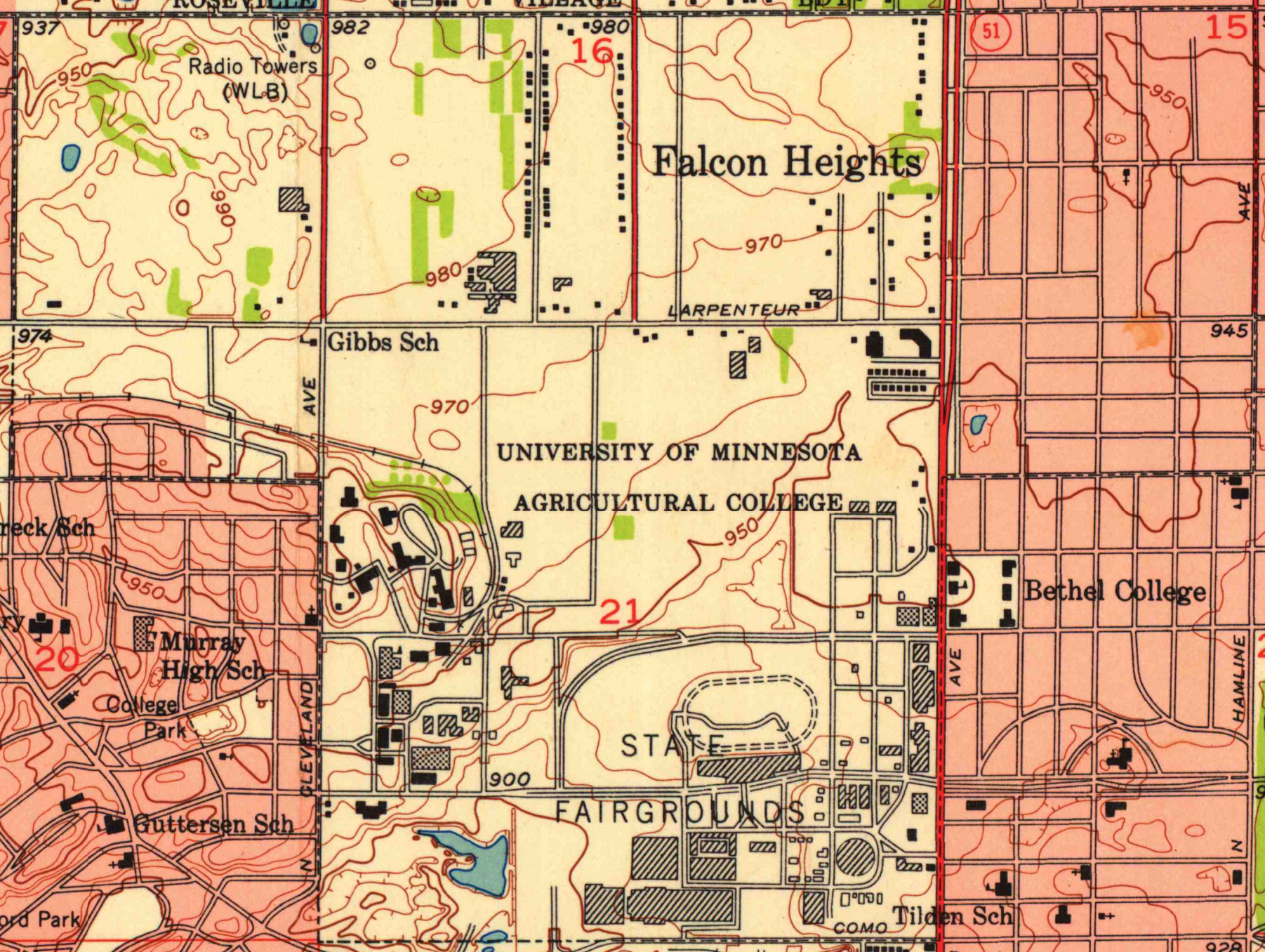
1951 map of Falcon Heights

=== Racial and ethnic composition ===
Falcon Heights, Minnesota – Racial and ethnic composition (NH = Non-Hispanic) Note: the US Census treats Hispanic/Latino as an ethnic category. This table excludes Latinos from the racial categories and assigns them to a separate category. Hispanics/Latinos can be of any race.
Race / Ethnicity	Pop 2000	Pop 2010	Pop 2020	% 2000	% 2010	% 2020
White (NH)	4,223	3,806	3,637	75.79%	71.53%	67.74%
Black or African American (NH)	184	421	538	3.30%	7.91%	10.02%
Native American or Alaska Native (NH)	22	15	23	0.40%	0.28%	0.43%
Asian (NH)	833	796	689	14.95%	14.96%	12.83%
Pacific Islander (NH)	7	1	0	0.13%	0.02%	0.00%
Some Other Race (NH)	24	5	25	0.43%	0.09%	0.47%
Mixed/Multi-Racial (NH)	107	120	274	1.92%	2.26%	5.10%
Hispanic or Latino	172	157	183	3.09%	2.95%	3.41%
Total	5,572	5,321	5,369	100.00%	100.00%	100.00%

=== 2020 census ===
As of the 2020 census, there were 5,369 people, 2,203 households, and 1,290 families residing in the city. The population density was 2,404.4 inhabitants per square mile (928.3/km^{2}). There were 2,336 housing units, of which 5.7% were vacant. The homeowner vacancy rate was 1.2% and the rental vacancy rate was 5.8%.

The median age was 34.1 years. 18.8% of residents were under the age of 18 and 16.5% of residents were 65 years of age or older. For every 100 females there were 93.8 males, and for every 100 females age 18 and over there were 89.8 males age 18 and over.

Of households in the city, 26.4% had children under the age of 18 living in them. Of all households, 47.7% were married-couple households, 17.7% were households with a male householder and no spouse or partner present, and 28.9% were households with a female householder and no spouse or partner present. About 30.6% of all households were made up of individuals and 10.6% had someone living alone who was 65 years of age or older.

100.0% of residents lived in urban areas, while 0.0% lived in rural areas.

=== 2010 census ===
As of the 2010 census, there were 5,321 people, 2,131 households, and 1,259 families living in the city. The population density was 2,386.1 inhabitants per square mile (921.3/km^{2}). There were 2,254 housing units at an average density of 1,010.8 per square mile (390.3/km^{2}). The racial makeup of the city was 73.3% White, 8.0% African American, 0.5% Native American, 15.0% Asian, 0.7% from other races, and 2.5% from two or more races. Hispanic or Latino of any race were 3.0% of the population.

There were 2,131 households, of which 26.8% had children under the age of 18 living with them, 48.7% were married couples living together, 7.6% had a female householder with no husband present, 2.7% had a male householder with no wife present, and 40.9% were non-families. 30.3% of all households were made up of individuals, and 10% had someone living alone who was 65 years of age or older. The average household size was 2.28 and the average family size was 2.91.

The median age in the city was 31.8 years. 19.4% of residents were under the age of 18; 16.8% were between the ages of 18 and 24; 29.7% were from 25 to 44; 21.8% were from 45 to 64; and 12.3% were 65 years of age or older. The gender makeup of the city was 46.9% male and 53.1% female.

=== 2000 census ===
As of the 2000 census, there were 5,572 people, 2,103 households, and 1,434 families living in the city. The population density was 2,487.9 inhabitants per square mile (960.6/km^{2}). There were 2,136 housing units at an average density of 953.7 inhabitants per square mile (368.2/km^{2}). The racial makeup of the city was 77.66% White, 3.36% African American, 0.43% Native American, 14.95% Asian, 0.13% Pacific Islander, 1.33% from other races, and 2.15% from two or more races. Hispanic or Latino of any race were 3.09% of the population.

There were 2,103 households, out of which 32.6% had children under the age of 18 living with them, 58.9% were married couples living together, 7.2% had a female householder with no husband present, and 31.8% were non-families. 25.6% of all households were made up of individuals, and 8.8% had someone living alone who was 65 years of age or older. The average household size was 2.41 and the average family size was 2.91.

In the city, the population was spread out, with 21.5% under the age of 18, 17.0% from 18 to 24, 32.1% from 25 to 44, 17.3% from 45 to 64, and 12.2% who were 65 years of age or older. The median age was 31 years. For every 100 females, there were 92.7 males. For every 100 females age 18 and over, there were 88.7 males.

The median income for a household in the city was $51,382, and the median income for a family was $59,415. Males had a median income of $43,693 versus $34,757 for females. The per capita income for the city was $25,370. About 8.8% of families and 9.6% of the population were below the poverty line, including 13.4% of those under age 18 and 5.2% of those age 65 or over.

== Politics ==
Presidential election results 1960–2024

Precinct General Election Results
Year	Republican	Democratic	Third parties
2024	16.2% 480	80.9% 2,391	2.8% 84
2020	16.9% 517	80.6% 2,468	2.5% 78
2016	17.6% 524	73.4% 2,181	9.0% 266
2012	25.9% 800	70.9% 2,188	3.2% 99
2008	27.7% 870	70.7% 2,219	1.6% 49
2004	32.0% 953	66.5% 1,981	1.5% 44
2000	34.9% 1,008	55.9% 1,617	9.2% 266
1996	34.7% 901	58.7% 1,524	6.6% 173
1992	29.8% 834	52.9% 1,481	17.3% 486
1988	42.6% 1,193	57.4% 1,608	0.0% 0
1984	48.8% 1,355	51.2% 1,420	0.0% 0
1980	40.0% 1,193	42.0% 1,253	18.0% 539
1976	50.6% 1,508	45.9% 1,369	3.5% 106
1972	55.9% 1,598	42.7% 1,219	1.4% 41
1968	52.9% 1,423	45.3% 1,221	1.8% 49
1964	52.2% 1,370	47.7% 1,250	0.1% 2
1960	65.7% 1,831	34.2% 954	0.1% 1

== Education ==
Falcon Heights is served by the Roseville Area School District. Falcon Heights Elementary is the only school within the city boundary. The elementary school features a park with two playgrounds, one of them built in 2006.

== In popular culture ==
The 2001 film Sugar & Spice was partly filmed in Falcon Heights.

A small part of the 1996 film Jingle All the Way starring Arnold Schwarzenegger was filmed at Falcon Heights Elementary.
