= Bald Eagle Lake =

Lake in Minnesota, United States

- Location within Minnesota
- Location: Anoka, Ramsey, and Washington counties, Minnesota
- Coordinates: 45°7′N 93°1′W
- Type: lake
- Surface area: 1,049 acres (4.25 km^{2})
- Average depth: 13.3 ft (4.1 m)
- Max. depth: 36 ft (11 m)

Bald Eagle Lake is a lake in Anoka, Ramsey, and Washington counties in the U.S. state of Minnesota.

Bald Eagle Lake was named from the fact bald eagles nested on the lake island. Bald Eagle Lake is known for its muskellunge population and is stocked with walleye and muskellunge.

At the center of the lake is an island addressed One Bald Eagle Island. The island is 2.3 acres and contains one house. The home is a fully renovated, 5 bedroom smart home valued at $6.6 million USD. Residents can get across the lake by boat in the summer, or drive across the ice in the winter. There's also a Hovercraft for travel in the fall and spring when the ice is not safe to drive on.

== See also ==
- List of lakes in Minnesota
