= Gem Lake, Minnesota =

City in Minnesota, United States

- City
- Location of the city of Gem Lake within Ramsey County, Minnesota
- Coordinates: 45°03′29″N 93°02′26″W
- Country: United States
- State: Minnesota
- County: Ramsey
- Incorporated: June 30, 1959

Area
  - Total: 1.10 sq mi (2.86 km^{2})
  - Land: 1.05 sq mi (2.71 km^{2})
  - Water: 0.062 sq mi (0.16 km^{2})
- Elevation: 945 ft (288 m)

Population (2020)
  - Total: 528
  - Density: 505/sq mi (195.1/km^{2})
- Time zone: UTC-6 (Central (CST))
  - Summer (DST): UTC-5 (CDT)
- ZIP code: 55110
- Area code: 651
- FIPS code: 27-23318
- GNIS feature ID: 2394871
- Website: gemlakemn.org

Gem Lake is a city in Ramsey County, Minnesota, United States. The population was 528 at the 2020 census.

== History ==
Gem Lake was incorporated on June 30, 1959, out of White Bear Township.

== Geography ==
According to the United States Census Bureau, the city has an area of 1.14 square miles (2.95 km^{2}), of which 1.08 square miles (2.80 km^{2}) is land and 0.06 square miles (0.16 km^{2}) is water. U.S. Route 61 in Minnesota serves as a main route. Nearby places include White Bear Lake, Maplewood, Little Canada, and Vadnais Heights.

== Demographics ==
Historical population
| Census | Pop. | Note | %± |
|---|---|---|---|
| 1960 | 305 | | — |
| 1970 | 216 | | −29.2% |
| 1980 | 394 | | 82.4% |
| 1990 | 439 | | 11.4% |
| 2000 | 419 | | −4.6% |
| 2010 | 393 | | −6.2% |
| 2020 | 528 | | 34.4% |
U.S. Decennial Census

=== 2010 census ===
As of the census of 2010, there were 393 people, 155 households, and 115 families living in the city. The population density was 363.9 inhabitants per square mile (140.5/km^{2}). There were 161 housing units at an average density of 149.1 per square mile (57.6/km^{2}). The racial makeup of the city was 93.1% White, 5.1% Asian, 1.0% from other races, and 0.8% from two or more races. Hispanic or Latino of any race were 2.5% of the population.

There were 155 households, of which 27.1% had children under the age of 18 living with them, 64.5% were married couples living together, 5.8% had a female householder with no husband present, 3.9% had a male householder with no wife present, and 25.8% were non-families. 20.0% of all households were made up of individuals, and 11.6% had someone living alone who was 65 years of age or older. The average household size was 2.54 and the average family size was 2.94.

The median age in the city was 49.5 years. 19.6% of residents were under the age of 18; 6.1% were between the ages of 18 and 24; 17% were from 25 to 44; 42.5% were from 45 to 64; and 14.8% were 65 years of age or older. The gender makeup of the city was 52.7% male and 47.3% female.

=== 2000 census ===
As of the census of 2000, there were 419 people, 139 households, and 111 families living in the city. The population density was 378.7 inhabitants per square mile (146.2/km^{2}). There were 145 housing units at an average density of 131.0 per square mile (50.6/km^{2}). The racial makeup of the city was 93.79% White, 1.19% African American, 2.63% Asian, 0.72% from other races, and 1.67% from two or more races.

There were 139 households, out of which 44.6% had children under the age of 18 living with them, 66.9% were married couples living together, 8.6% had a female householder with no husband present, and 20.1% were non-families. 18.7% of all households were made up of individuals, and 8.6% had someone living alone who was 65 years of age or older. The average household size was 3.01 and the average family size was 3.40.

In the city, the population was spread out, with 30.3% under the age of 18, 6.9% from 18 to 24, 28.4% from 25 to 44, 23.4% from 45 to 64, and 11.0% who were 65 years of age or older. The median age was 38 years. For every 100 females, there were 98.6 males. For every 100 females age 18 and over, there were 98.6 males.

The median income for a household in the city was $64,167, and the median income for a family was $82,909. Males had a median income of $39,583 versus $28,000 for females. The per capita income for the city was $28,750. About 1.8% of families and 5.9% of the population were below the poverty line, including 4.3% of those under age 18 and none of those age 65 or over.

== Politics ==
Gem Lake is a part of Minnesota's 4th congressional district, represented by Democrat Betty McCollum. In the state legislature, it is a part of Minnesota Senate, District 36, represented by Heather Gustafson and Minnesota House of Representatives, District 36B, represented by Brion Curran. Both members of the Minnesota State Legislature are Democrats.

Presidential election results 1996–2024

United States presidential election results for Gem Lake, Minnesota
| Year | Republican | | Democratic | | Third party(ies) | |
| Year | No. | % | No. | % | No. | % |
|---|---|---|---|---|---|---|
| 1996 | 62 | 27.56% | 126 | 56.00% | 37 | 16.44% |
| 2000 | 120 | 49.38% | 110 | 45.27% | 13 | 5.35% |
| 2004 | 132 | 50.38% | 128 | 48.85% | 2 | 0.76% |
| 2008 | 125 | 45.62% | 143 | 52.19% | 6 | 2.19% |
| 2012 | 123 | 46.77% | 135 | 51.33% | 5 | 1.90% |
| 2016 | 124 | 44.13% | 134 | 47.69% | 23 | 8.19% |
| 2020 | 177 | 47.33% | 186 | 49.73% | 11 | 2.94% |
| 2024 | 183 | 49.19% | 183 | 49.19% | 6 | 1.61% |
