= Gibbs Museum of Pioneer and Dakotah Life =

- Heman Gibbs Farmstead
- U.S. National Register of Historic Places
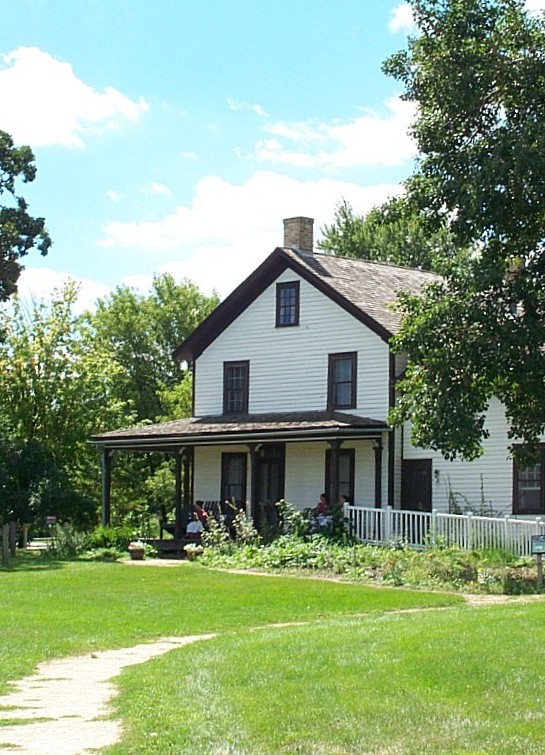
- The Heman Gibbs farmhouse in 2005

- Location within Minnesota Location within the United States
- Location: 2097 Larpenteur Avenue, Falcon Heights, Minnesota
- Coordinates: 44°59′32″N 93°11′18″W
- Built: 1854
- Architectural style: Greek Revival
- Website: http://www.rchs.com/gibbs-farm/
- NRHP reference No.: 75001009
- Added to NRHP: April 23, 1975

The Gibbs Farm is a museum in Falcon Heights, Minnesota, United States. The site was once the farmstead of Heman and Jane Gibbs, first built in 1854; the existing farmhouse includes the small, original cabin. The museum seeks to educate visitors on the lives of 19th-century Minnesota pioneers and the Dakota people who lived in southern Minnesota before the arrival of Europeans.

In 1974 the farm was listed on the National Register of Historic Places. The listing consists of the farmhouse and barn, as the other museum structures are not original to the site.

== Description ==
An open-air museum, the Gibbs Farm features an original farmhouse, barn, and school house, as well as a replica sod house, bark lodge, and tipi with replica Dakotah furniture, clothing and tools.

The objects in the farmhouse date from the mid-19th century on and are part of the Ramsey County Historical Society collection; those belonging to the Gibbs family are featured in the house tour. Objects of particular interest include a family hair wreath, original wallpaper, a concealed murphy bed and various other original artifacts.

The museum grounds offer visitors a natural Minnesota prairie as it would have looked like in the 19th century as well as a Dakotah medicine teaching garden (the turtle garden), Dakotah vegetable garden, pioneer vegetable garden, a heritage apple orchard and farm animals.

The programs on the site include summer camps, school tours, as well as public hours during the summer weekends.

== History ==
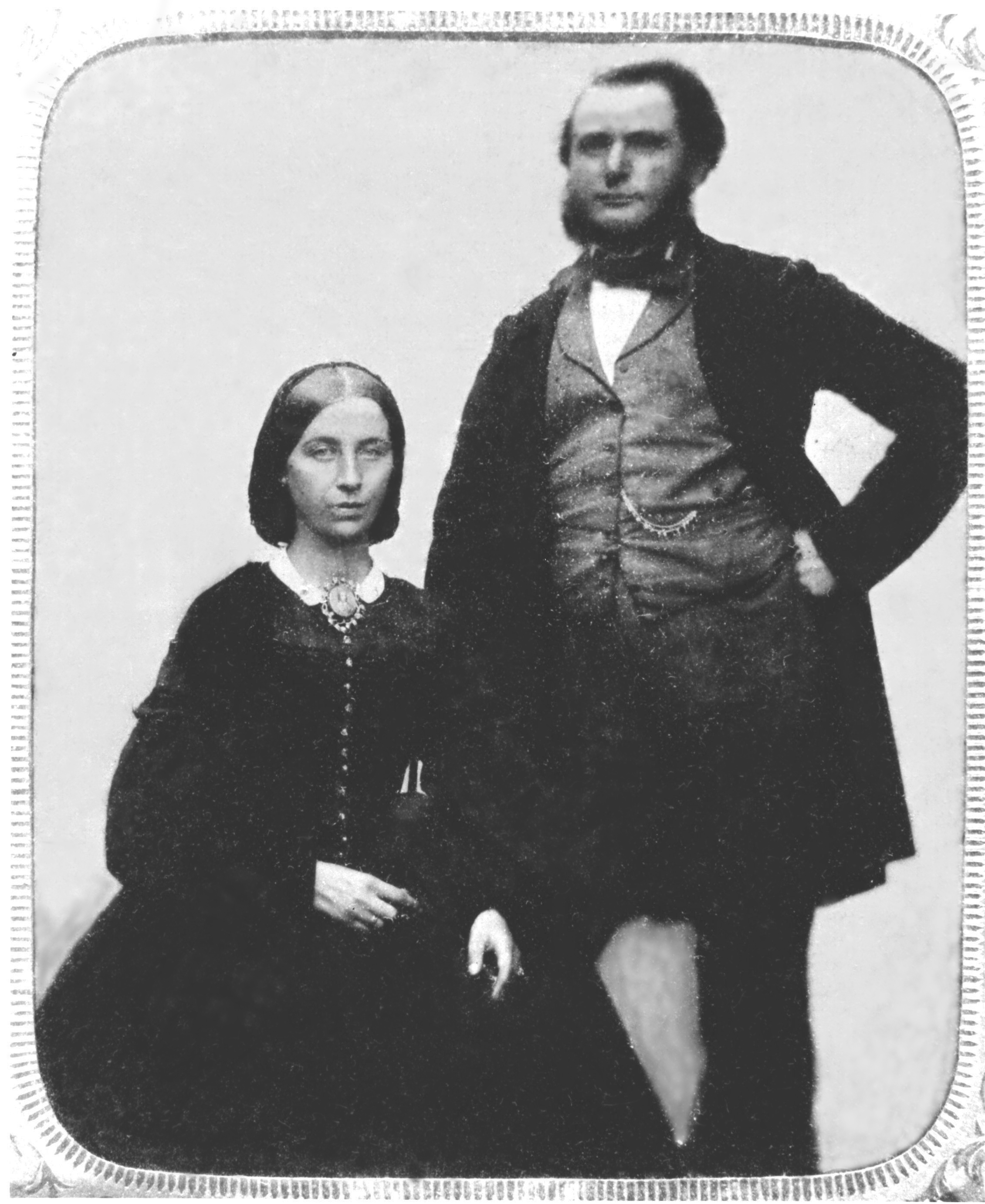
Jane and Heman Gibbs

The museum focuses on the story of Jane Gibbs (née DeBow), who was taken at age six or seven from the neighbor's home where she was living due to her mother's severe illness near Batavia, NY in 1833 by the Stevens, a missionary family as a replacement for the daughter, their oldest, whom they had lost to illness. The Stevens family also included two younger boys. They eventually brought Jane west with them where they were assigned by the American Board of Missionaries to bring Christianity to the Dakotah people living near Lake Calhoun, Bde Maka Ska in what is now Minneapolis, Minnesota and Lake Harriet. They arrived at Fort Snelling in May 1835 when Jane was around nine years old. Once the mission was built on the shores of Lake Harriet about a mile from the village of Cloud Man, Jane attended the missionary school with the part Dakotah children of the soldiers stationed at Fort Snelling and traders and learned to speak their language. She developed a close relationship with the Dakotah and was given the name "Zitkadan Usawin" (Little Crow that was Caught) by the women of the village, who were moved by the story of her departure from her mother.

She moved with the Stevens, who considered her their adopted daughter, to Southern Minnesota and eventually to Illinois where Jane parted company with them after Mrs. Stevens death. She eventually met and married Heman Gibbs in Galena, Illinois in 1848. They returned to what was now known as the Minnesota Territory in 1849, and bought the land that would become the future museum, the same year.

Shortly after buying the land, Jane and Heman discovered an Indian trail running through it. One day in the fall, they found some of the same Dakotah who Jane had grown up with used the trail on their annual migration north to their wild ricing, hunting and fishing grounds in present-day Forest Lake, Minnesota. The Gibbs property laid at the intersection of two of these ricing trails.

Each year during the fall, the Dakotah band would set up camp at the Gibbs farm for up to three weeks to visit with Jane and her family before continuing their journey.

== Sod house ==
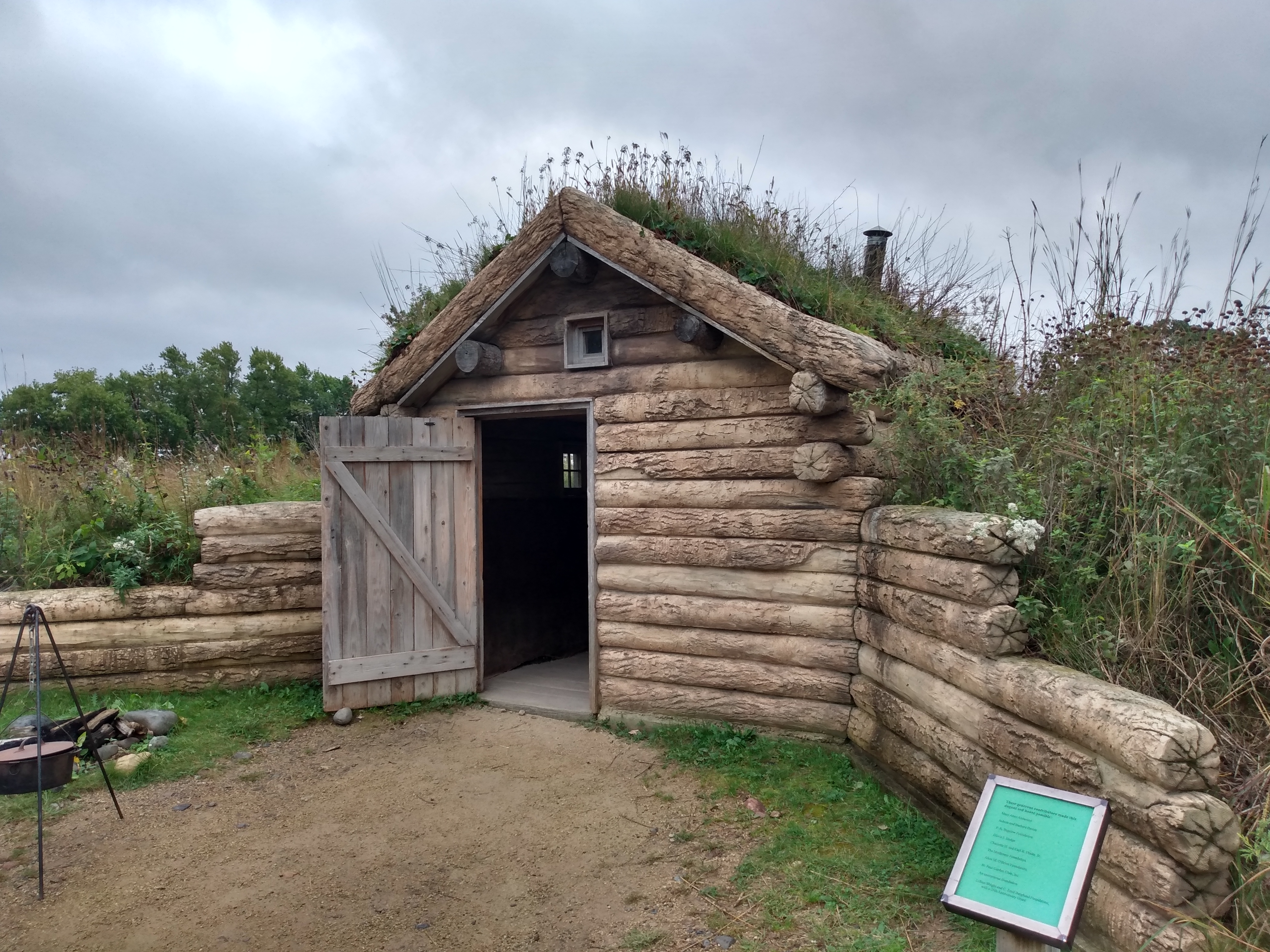
Replica sod house.

After buying the land in 1849, Jane and Heman Gibbs built a small, one-room, dugout sod house (colloquially known as the "Soddy" where they lived for 5 years while farming the land. The house was 10'x12' and built with logs and featured a sod roof. This design kept the house well insulated in the winter and cool in the summer.

The original location of the soddy was to the right of the front porch of the farm house and was excavated in 1995. A replica built from the architectural investigation now stands in the prairie, and the site of the original soddy is preserved in an enclosed space.

== Farmhouse ==
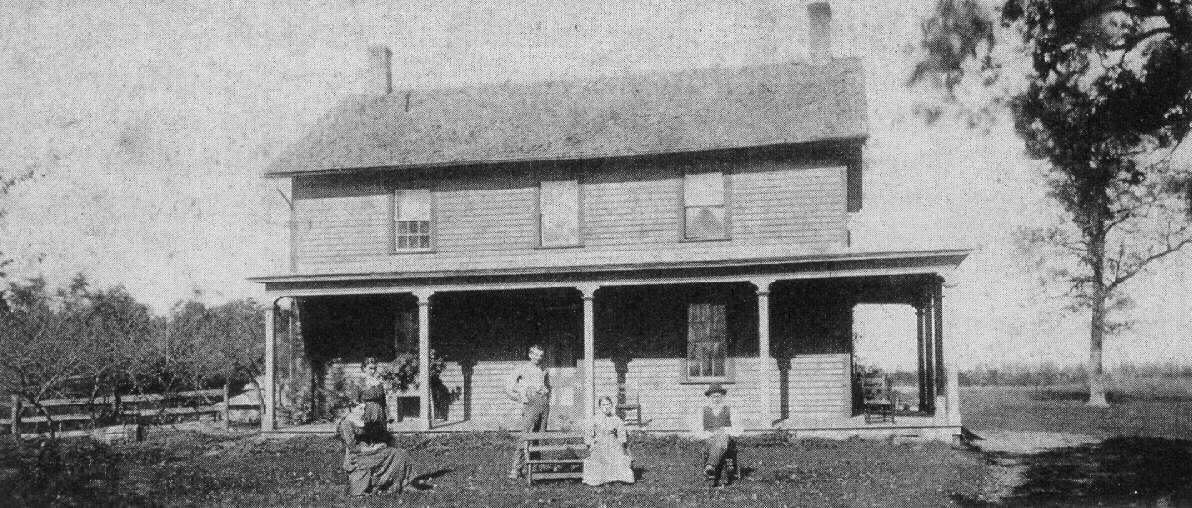
The south-facing side of the Gibbs farm house with family outside. The oak tree to the right of the photograph still exists today.

In 1854 Jane and Heman built a one-room farmhouse just a few yards away from their sod house. It stayed a one-room house for 13 years, providing shelter for the five Gibbs children: Ida (adopted), Abbie, William, Frank, and Lillie.

In 1867 the house was enlarged to meet the space needs of the family. The one-room house became an eight-room farmhouse as big and modern as any in the area. The enlarged house featured a parlor, six bedrooms (four upstairs, one downstairs, and the original room), the hired men's room (called the "Pen" and now used as a "farm lab" with farm tools for visitors to enjoy), and a summer kitchen.

== School house ==
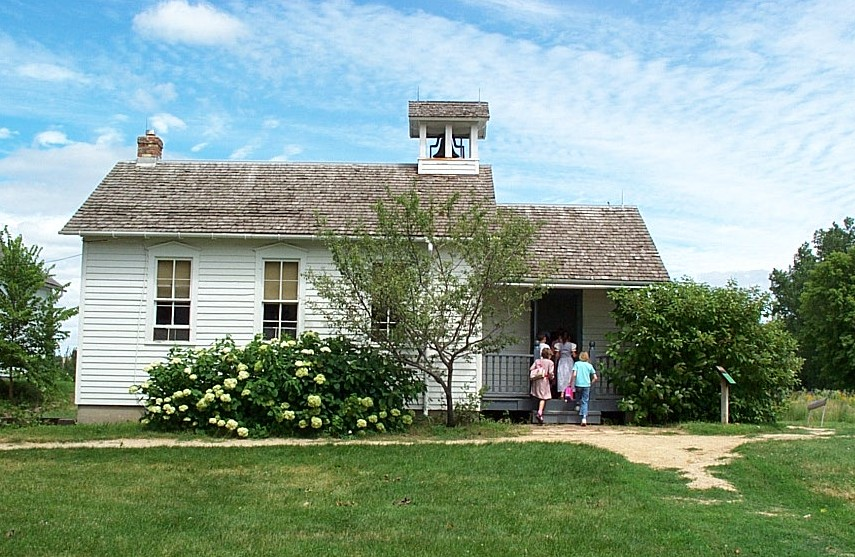
The Gibbs Museum school house in summer

Heman Gibbs was an educated man and believed in education for his own children and those in the area. In 1871 he sold the land across the street for a schoolhouse and while it was being built he allowed class to be held in the farmhouse. The Gibbs family also boarded the teacher in their house.

The schoolhouse on the museum grounds today is not the original Heman was instrumental in getting built. The original one-room schoolhouse was on the property in the 1950s when it was used in the "Baby Boom" years by the budding Roseville School System (Minnesota ISD #623) as an overflow classroom until the "new Brimhall school" was built later in the decade. One class of 3rd grade students from the relatively new Falcon Heights School was rotated to the Gibbs school while the rest of the 3rd grade was rotated to the three classrooms in the "Old Brimhall" school on County Road B. Other makeshift classrooms were employed by the school district for fifth-grade students at Fairview Junior High, in the gym at Lauderdale School, and a disused old classroom in the former school building attached to the new Lexington School. All these creative accommodations ended with District 623's massive expansion program and the finishing of Fairview Jr. High, the "new" Brimhall school and Alexander Ramsey High School. Previously, the high school students of the area had attended St. Paul Central High School.

The historic school building was on the southwest corner of the intersection, across Larpenteur Avenue from the Gibbs House. In its final career it was used for many years in winter as sales office for the University of Minnesota forestry students' Christmas tree sales project.

The schoolhouse now on the museum site was built near Milan, Minnesota, around the same as the original schoolhouse, and represents the typical pioneer one-room schoolhouse. It was bought in 1966 for $100 by the Ramsey County Historical Society and had to make the 140-mile (230 km) journey to the Gibbs Museum of Pioneer and Dakotah life between the hours of 9am–3pm while avoiding all major highways or roads, and being parked on the side of the road anytime before or after those hours.

== See also ==
- List of museums in Minnesota
