= Ramsey County, Minnesota =

County in Minnesota, United States

- County
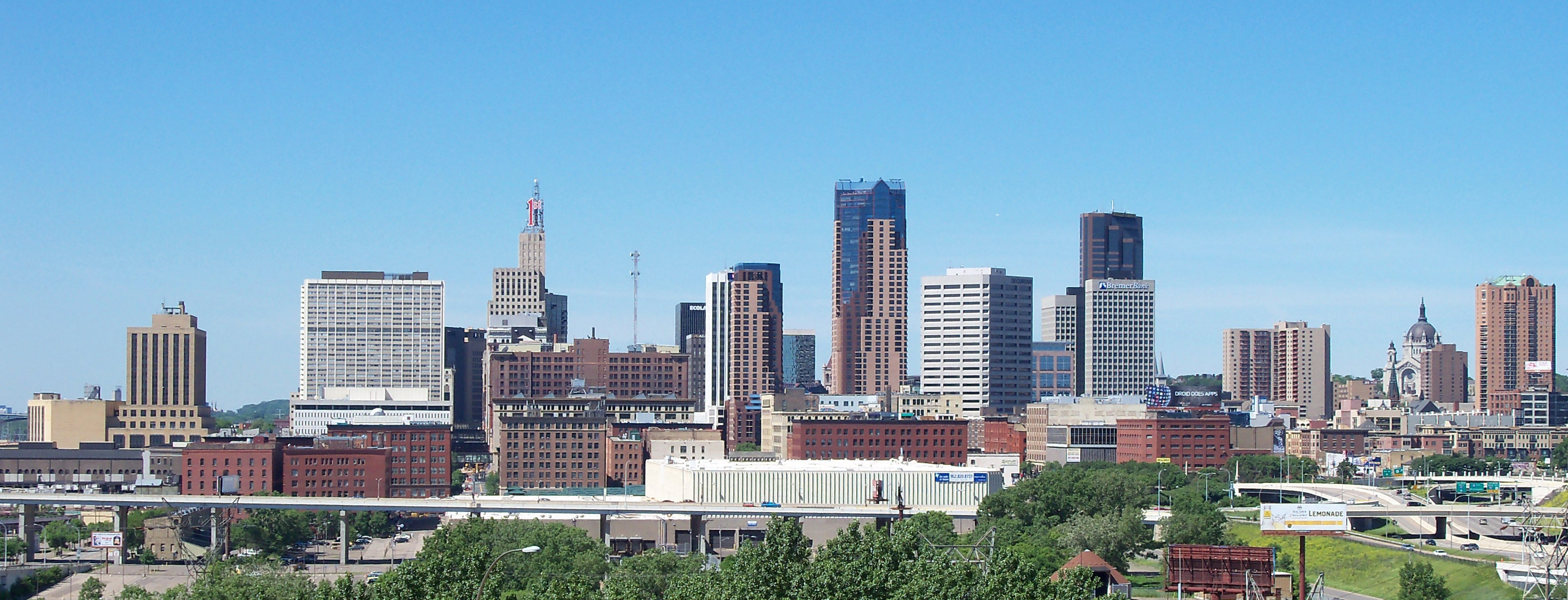
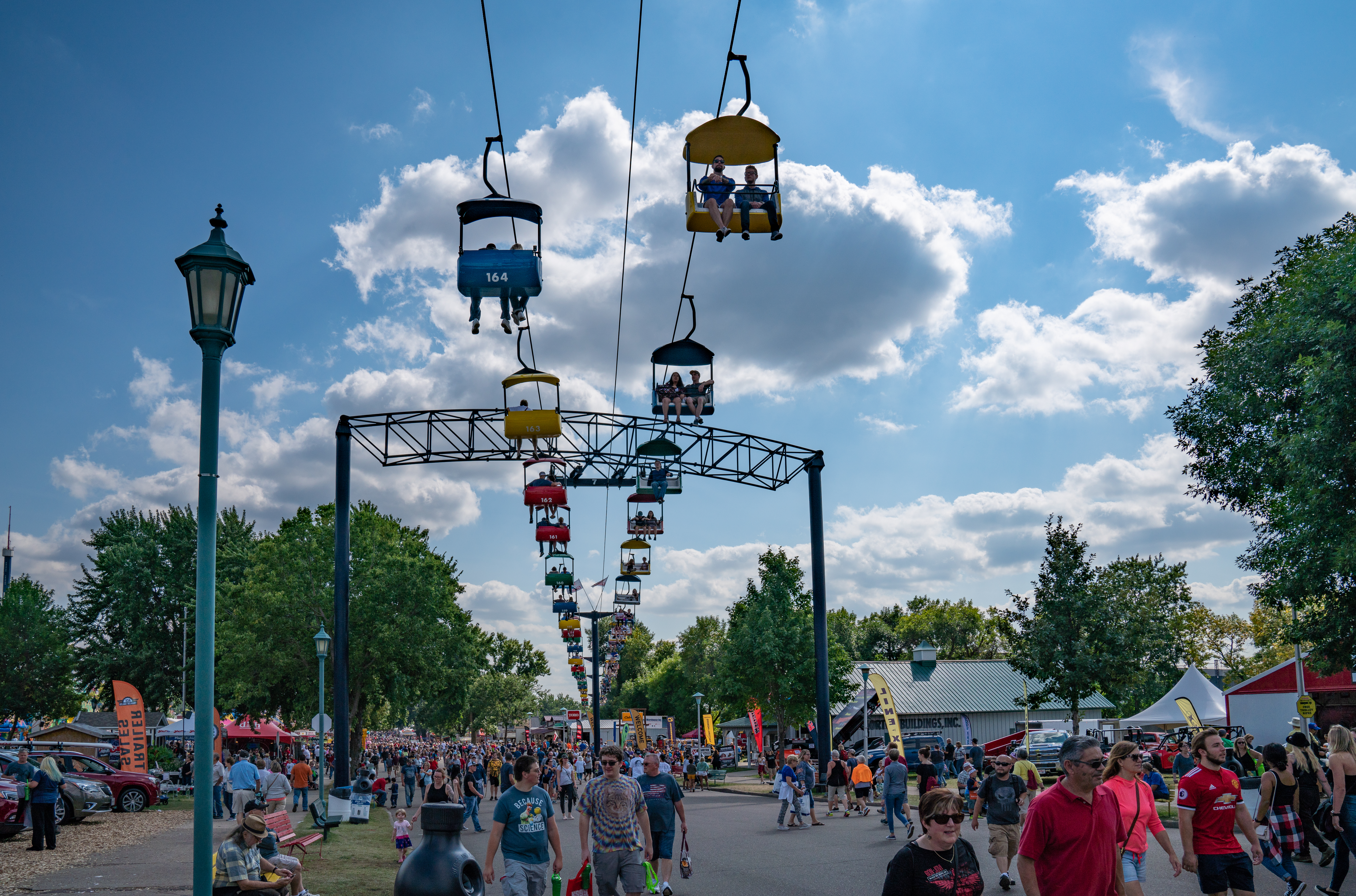
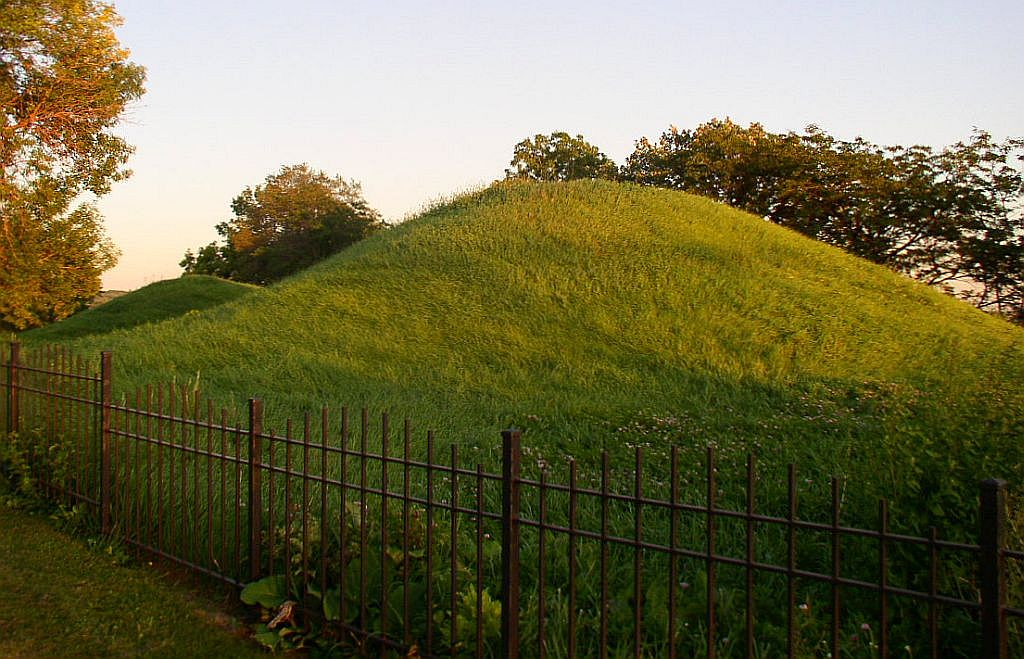
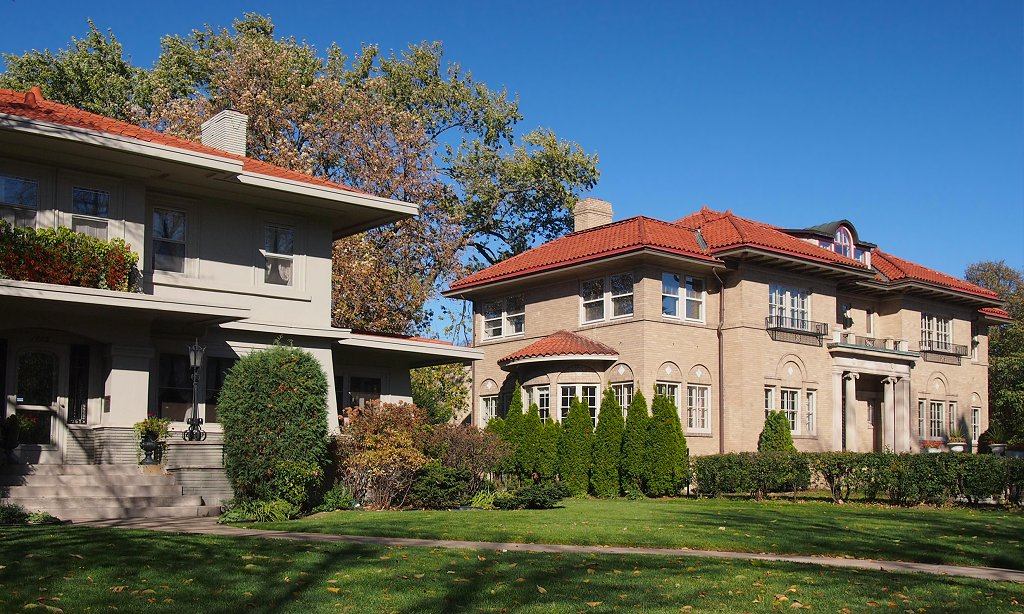
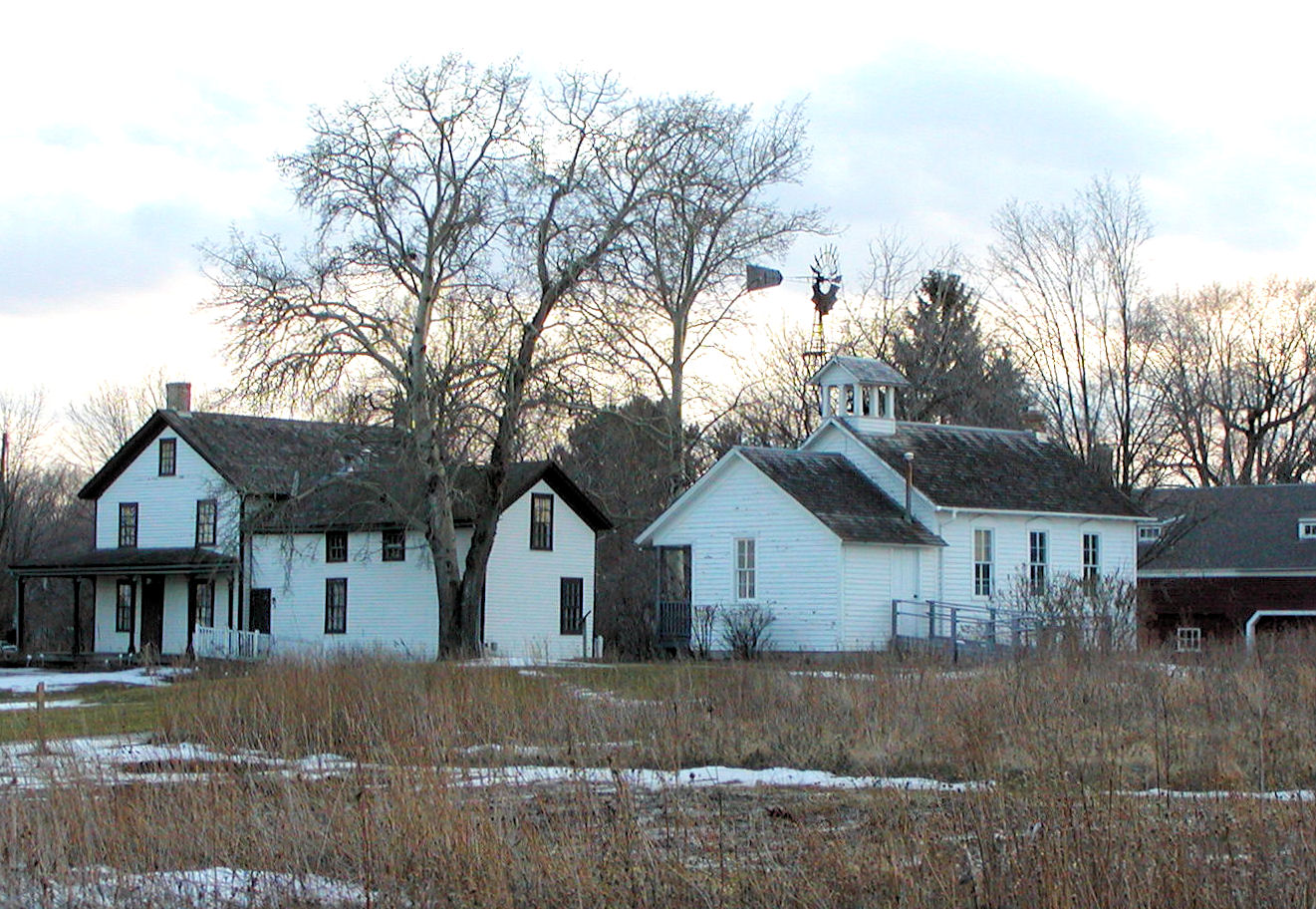
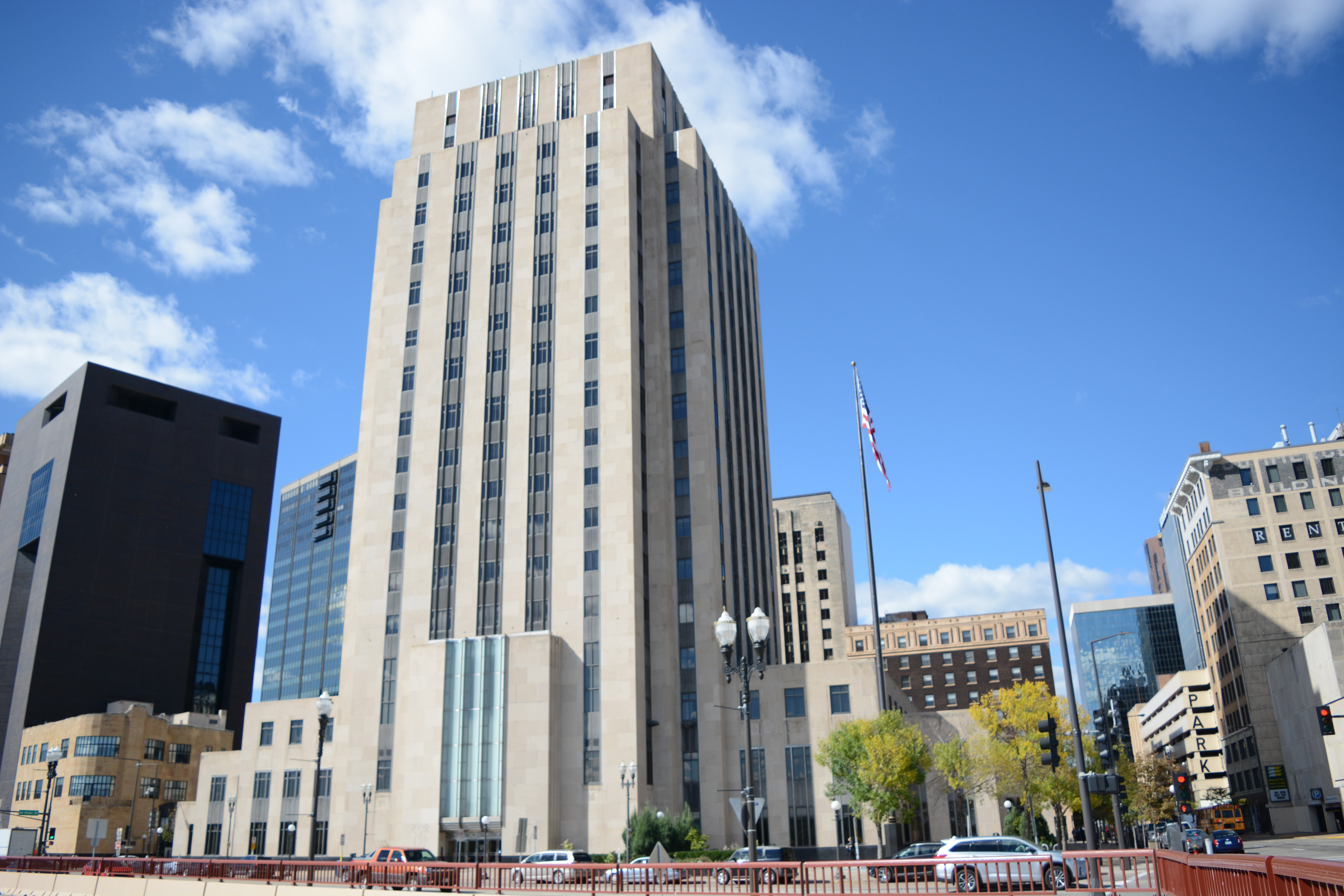
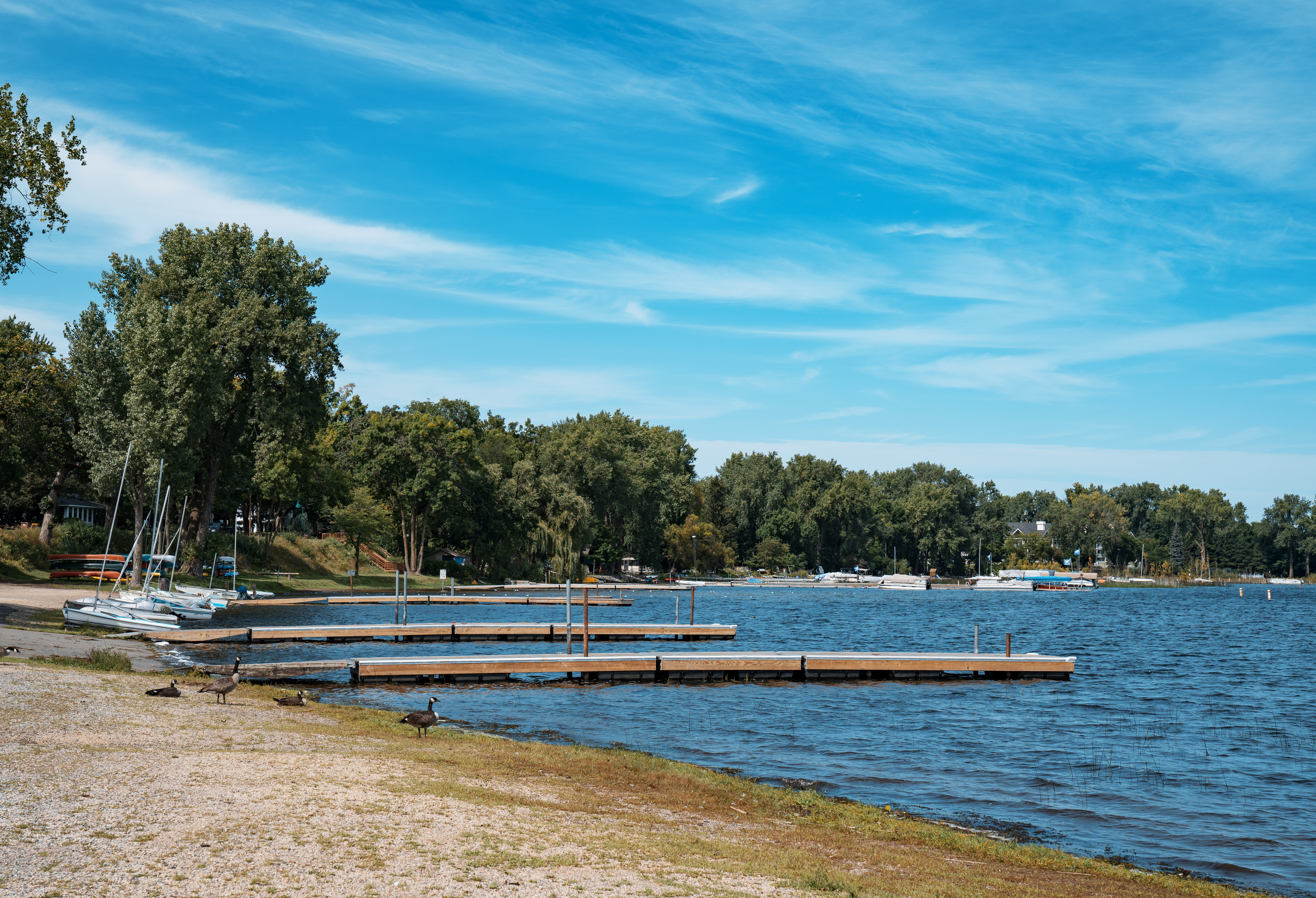
- Saint Paul Minnesota State Fairgrounds Wicaḣapi Regional Park Summit Avenue Historic District Gibbs Farmstead in Falcon Heights Ramsey County Courthouse White Bear Lake

- Location within the U.S. state of Minnesota
- Coordinates: 45°00′54.734″N 93°05′59.873″W
- Country: United States
- State: Minnesota
- Founded: October 27, 1849
- Named for: Alexander Ramsey
- Seat: Saint Paul
- Largest city: Saint Paul

Area
  - Total: 170.013 sq mi (440.33 km^{2})
  - Land: 152.257 sq mi (394.34 km^{2})
  - Water: 17.756 sq mi (45.99 km^{2}) 10.44%

Population (2020)
  - Total: 552,352
  - Estimate (2025): 541,623 ▼
  - Density: 3,561.234/sq mi (1,375.000/km^{2})
- Time zone: UTC−6 (Central)
  - Summer (DST): UTC−5 (CDT)
- Congressional districts: 4th, 5th
- Website: www.ramseycountymn.gov

Ramsey County is a county in the U.S. state of Minnesota. As of the 2020 census, the population was 552,352, making it the state's second-most populous county, and was estimated to be 541,623 in 2025. Its county seat and largest city is Saint Paul, the state capital and the twin city of Minneapolis. The county was founded in 1849 and is named for Alexander Ramsey, the first governor of the Minnesota Territory. Ramsey County is part of the Minneapolis–Saint Paul–Bloomington, MN–WI Metropolitan statistical area. It is Minnesota's smallest and most densely populated county, as well as the 38th-most densely populated county in the United States in 2010.

== History ==
With the establishment of the Minnesota Territory in 1849, nine counties, including Ramsey County, were created. In 1849, Ramsey County included all of what later became the present-day counties of Ramsey, Anoka, Isanti, and Kanabec, as well as parts of Washington, Pine, Carlton, Aitkin, Mille Lacs, and Hennepin. One of Ramsey County's early settlers was Heman Gibbs, whose farm is now the Gibbs Museum of Pioneer and Dakotah Life (Gibbs Farm) in Falcon Heights. Ramsey County remained largely farmland until small villages began to appear in the late 19th century, with the incorporation of North St. Paul in 1887, New Brighton in 1891, and White Bear Lake in 1921.

== Government and politics ==
Ramsey County is overwhelmingly Democratic in presidential elections, not having voted for a Republican presidential nominee since 1924. In 2020, Democratic nominee Joe Biden received the largest share of the vote for any candidate in the county's history, with over 71%.

=== County sheriff ===
The Ramsey County Sheriff's Office was established in the old Minnesota Territory in 1849. The current sheriff is Bob Fletcher, who was elected in 2018 and reelected in 2022. The Ramsey County sheriff is elected to a four-year term in an election concurrent with the federal midterm elections.

The sheriff's office provides patrol and investigation for communities without local police forces and is available as backup for all communities. In addition to enforcing the law, the office provides town police services under contract to Arden Hills, Falcon Heights, Little Canada, North Oaks, Shoreview, Vadnais Heights, and White Bear Township.

The Ramsey County Sheriff's Office provides a number of unique services as mandated by law. This includes detention for court and other court services, safety, rescue, and law enforcement on the waterways. The office provides safety classes and coordinates community volunteer efforts. It is responsible for the county jail, more officially the Adult Detention Center, which can hold 500 prisoners and has a staff of about 150.

Community	Law enforcement	Fire protection	Ambulance
Arden Hills	Ramsey County Sheriff	Lake Johanna Fire	Allina Medical Transport
Falcon Heights	Ramsey County Sheriff	Saint Paul Fire	Saint Paul Fire
Gem Lake	White Bear Lake Police	White Bear Lake Fire	White Bear Lake Fire
Lauderdale	Saint Anthony Police	Saint Paul Fire	Saint Paul Fire
Little Canada	Ramsey County Sheriff	Little Canada Fire & Rescue	Allina Medical Transport
Maplewood	Maplewood Police	Maplewood Fire	Maplewood Fire
Minnesota State Fairgrounds	Minnesota State Fair Police	Saint Paul Fire	Saint Paul Fire
Mounds View	Mounds View Police	SBM Fire	Allina Medical Transport
New Brighton	New Brighton Police Division	New Brighton Fire Division	Allina Medical Transport
North Oaks	Ramsey County Sheriff	Lake Johanna Fire	Allina Medical Transport
North Saint Paul	North Saint Paul Police	North Saint Paul Fire	Lakeview Emergency Medical
Roseville	Roseville Police	Roseville Fire	Allina Medical Transport
Saint Anthony	Saint Anthony Police	Saint Anthony Fire	Hennepin EMS
Saint Paul	Saint Paul Police	Saint Paul Fire	Saint Paul Fire
Shoreview	Ramsey County Sheriff	Lake Johanna Fire	Allina Medical Transport
University of Minnesota-St. Paul	University Police	Saint Paul Fire	Saint Paul Fire
Vadnais Heights	Ramsey County Sheriff	Vadnais Heights Fire	Allina Medical Transport
White Bear Lake	White Bear Lake Police	White Bear Lake Fire	White Bear Lake Fire
White Bear Township	Ramsey County Sheriff	White Bear Lake Fire	White Bear Lake Fire

=== County attorney ===
The Ramsey County attorney prosecutes felony crimes committed within the jurisdiction of Ramsey County. The current county attorney is John Choi, who was elected in 2010 and reelected in 2014, 2018, and 2022.

=== County commissioners ===
The county commission elects a chair who presides at meetings. Commissioners as of February 24, 2025, are:

District	Commissioner	Assumed office	Current term ends
1st	Tara Jebens-Singh	January 6, 2025	January 1, 2029
2nd	Mary Jo McGuire (vice chair)	January 6, 2013	January 1, 2029
3rd	Garrison McMurtrey	February 24, 2025	January 4, 2027
4th	Rena Moran	January 2, 2023	January 4, 2027
5th	Rafael E. Ortega (board chair)	2014	January 4, 2027
6th	Mai Chong Xiong	January 2, 2023	January 4, 2027
7th	Kelly Miller	January 6, 2025	January 1, 2029

United States presidential election results for Ramsey County, Minnesota
Year	Republican		Democratic		Third party(ies)	
Year	No.	%	No.	%	No.	%
1892	11,307	41.99%	12,817	47.60%	2,802	10.41%
1896	17,522	57.66%	12,048	39.65%	817	2.69%
1900	15,384	56.26%	10,931	39.97%	1,030	3.77%
1904	18,269	70.22%	5,860	22.52%	1,889	7.26%
1908	16,556	54.64%	11,613	38.33%	2,131	7.03%
1912	4,109	12.70%	12,431	38.43%	15,810	48.87%
1916	13,317	35.08%	22,291	58.72%	2,353	6.20%
1920	40,204	58.62%	21,110	30.78%	7,273	10.60%
1924	39,566	47.66%	8,407	10.13%	35,046	42.21%
1928	53,054	47.84%	56,807	51.22%	1,049	0.95%
1932	38,589	35.74%	66,128	61.24%	3,263	3.02%
1936	30,553	23.37%	86,286	66.00%	13,889	10.62%
1940	57,093	41.32%	78,990	57.17%	2,082	1.51%
1944	53,052	39.67%	78,759	58.89%	1,933	1.45%
1948	48,142	34.17%	88,528	62.84%	4,217	2.99%
1952	76,093	44.40%	93,783	54.73%	1,494	0.87%
1956	80,701	47.74%	87,784	51.93%	554	0.33%
1960	77,408	41.50%	108,464	58.15%	655	0.35%
1964	56,898	29.70%	133,948	69.91%	746	0.39%
1968	64,068	32.75%	122,568	62.64%	9,020	4.61%
1972	95,716	45.59%	108,392	51.63%	5,843	2.78%
1976	86,480	37.92%	133,682	58.62%	7,905	3.47%
1980	78,860	33.88%	124,774	53.61%	29,110	12.51%
1984	95,667	39.95%	141,623	59.15%	2,153	0.90%
1988	88,736	37.78%	143,767	61.20%	2,393	1.02%
1992	68,206	27.08%	130,932	51.97%	52,777	20.95%
1996	66,954	29.34%	133,878	58.66%	27,381	12.00%
2000	87,669	35.89%	138,470	56.69%	18,139	7.43%
2004	97,096	35.62%	171,846	63.04%	3,635	1.33%
2008	88,942	32.06%	182,974	65.96%	5,470	1.97%
2012	86,800	31.13%	184,938	66.33%	7,084	2.54%
2016	70,894	25.95%	177,738	65.07%	24,511	8.97%
2020	77,376	26.14%	211,620	71.50%	6,981	2.36%
2024	75,284	27.08%	195,168	70.20%	7,573	2.72%

== Geography ==
According to the United States Census Bureau, the county has an area of 170.013 square miles (440.33 km^{2}), of which 152.257 square miles (394.34 km^{2}) is land and 17.756 square miles (45.99 km^{2}) (10.44%) is water. It is Minnesota's smallest county by area, and has been considered completely urbanized since the 1990 census.

=== Adjacent counties ===
- Anoka County (north)
- Washington County (east)
- Dakota County (south)
- Hennepin County (west)

=== National protected area ===
- Mississippi National River and Recreation Area (part)

== Transportation ==
=== Rail ===
Ramsey County is a major freight hub along BNSF's Northern Transcon route and is also served by Union Pacific and Canadian Pacific.

Amtrak offers daily intercity passenger rail service on the Empire Builder from Union Depot in Saint Paul. Light rail service is provided by Metro, a light rail and bus rapid transit system operated by Metro Transit that connects several communities in Ramsey and Hennepin Counties. The Metro Green Line connects Union Depot to Target Field station in Minneapolis, in neighboring Hennepin County.

=== Road ===
Ramsey County is served by several interstate highways, including Interstate 35 and Interstate 94. I-35 has two routes through Ramsey County. I-35E enters the county from Dakota County to the south and proceeds north through Saint Paul, where it intersects I-94, then continues north to Little Canada, where it briefly joins with I-694 before continuing north through Vadnais Heights to Washington County. I-35W crosses from Minneapolis to the west through Saint Anthony before turning north through New Brighton, where it intersects I-694, and then to Anoka County, where it goes on to rejoin I-35E in Washington County.

Near the western edge of the county, I-94 enters from Minneapolis where it runs almost parallel to University Avenue until it meets I-35E in Saint Paul and continues east to Washington County. I-494 passes through the southeast corner of the county between Dakota and Washington Counties. From Anoka County in the west, I-694 takes a path through New Brighton, where it meets I-35W, to the junction with I-35E in Little Canada and finally to Washington County in the east.

Ramsey County is also accessible by several U.S. Highways, in particular US 10, US 52, and US 61. US 10 enters from Washington County in the south and continues north to meet I-94 just east of Saint Paul where it turns west to run concurrently with I-94, I-35E, I-694, and finally I-35W before continuing northwest to Anoka County. US 52 runs from South Saint Paul in Dakota County north to downtown Saint Paul where it meets I-94 and turns west to run concurrently with it all the way to the North Dakota border. From the south, US 61 runs concurrently with US 10 and then I-94 until it continues northeast on surface streets through the East Side of Saint Paul. From Saint Paul, US 61 continues north through Maplewood and White Bear Lake before crossing the border into Washington County.

In addition to these federal highways, Ramsey County is served by several Minnesota State Highways, including MN 36 and MN 51, which are divided highways for much of their length.

The county also has jurisdiction over 264.108 miles of County State Aid Highways as well as 21,031 miles of county roads and 59 bridges maintained and monitored by the county's Public Works Department.

==== Major highways ====
- Interstate 35E
- Interstate 35W
- Interstate 94
- Interstate 694
- U.S. Highway 10
- U.S. Highway 12
- U.S. Highway 52
- U.S. Highway 61
- Minnesota State Highway 5
- Minnesota State Highway 13
- Minnesota State Highway 36
- Minnesota State Highway 51
- Minnesota State Highway 120
- Minnesota State Highway 149
- Minnesota State Highway 280
- County Road 30 (Larpenteur Avenue)
- County Road 34 (University Avenue)
- County Road 36/37 (Shepard Road/Warner Road)
- Other county roads

=== Air ===
The primary airport serving Ramsey County is Minneapolis–Saint Paul International Airport, in neighboring Hennepin County. The only airport in Ramsey County is Saint Paul Downtown Airport, a smaller commercial airport with three runways primarily used for general aviation and military operations.

== Demographics ==
Historical population
Census	Pop.	Note	%±
1850	2,227		—
1860	12,150		445.6%
1870	23,085		90.0%
1880	45,890		98.8%
1890	139,796		204.6%
1900	170,554		22.0%
1910	223,675		31.1%
1920	244,554		9.3%
1930	286,721		17.2%
1940	309,935		8.1%
1950	355,332		14.6%
1960	422,525		18.9%
1970	476,255		12.7%
1980	459,784		−3.5%
1990	485,765		5.7%
2000	511,035		5.2%
2010	508,640		−0.5%
2020	552,352		8.6%
2025 (est.)	541,623	▼	−1.9%
U.S. Decennial Census; 1790–1960 1900–1990; 1990–2000 2010–2020

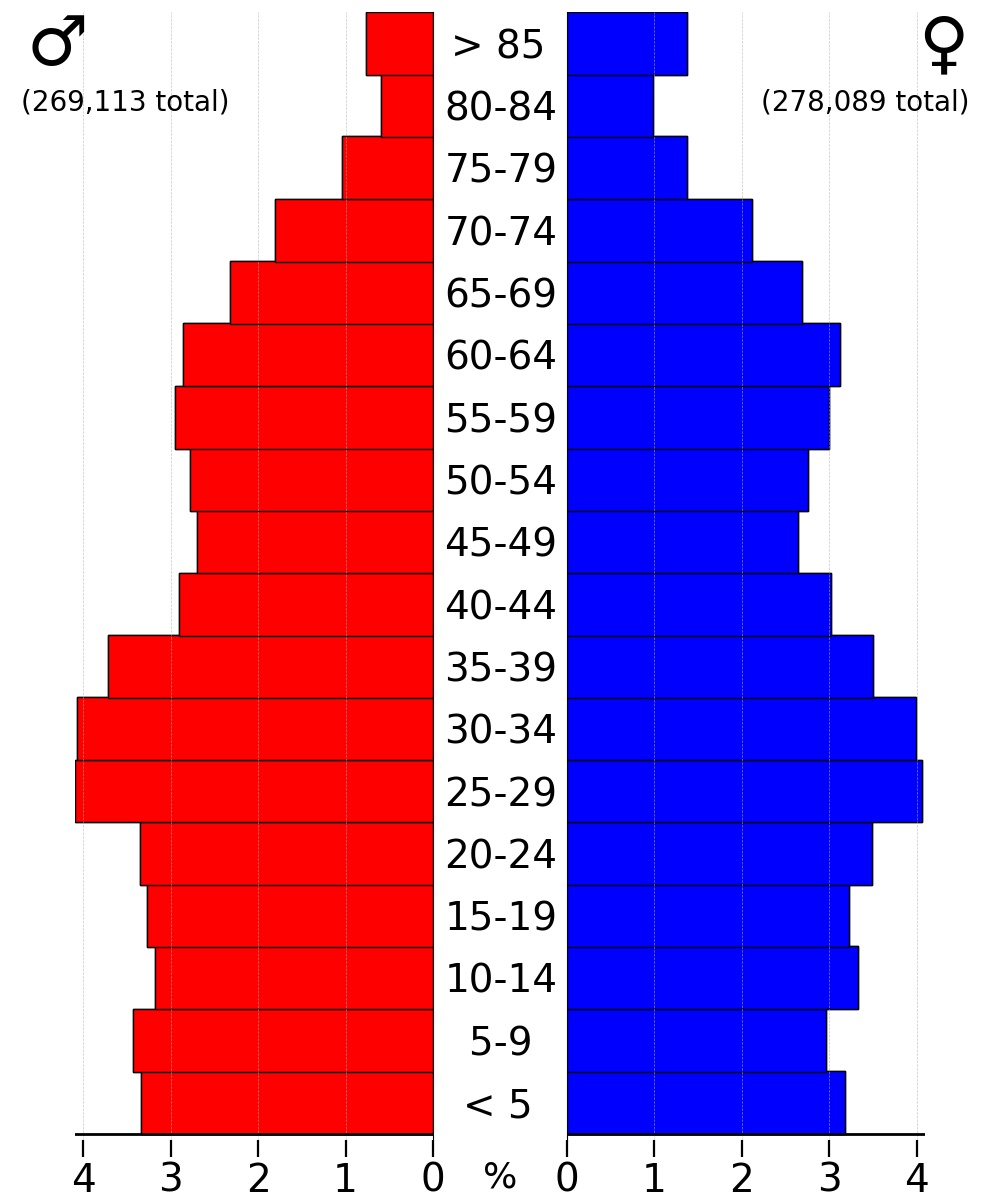
2022 US Census population pyramid for Ramsey County, from ACS 5-year estimates

As of the third quarter of 2024, the median home value in Ramsey County was $329,720.

As of the 2023 American Community Survey, there are 219,075 estimated households in Ramsey County with an average of 2.41 persons per household. The county has a median household income of $81,004. Approximately 11.9% of the county's population lives at or below the poverty line. Ramsey County has an estimated 68.7% employment rate, with 45.5% of the population holding a bachelor's degree or higher and 91.5% holding a high school diploma.

The top five reported ancestries (people were allowed to report up to two ancestries, thus the figures will generally add to more than 100%) were English (76.5%), Spanish (5.3%), Indo-European (2.1%), Asian and Pacific Islander (10.6%), and Other (5.4%).

=== Racial and ethnic composition ===
Ramsey County, Minnesota – racial and ethnic composition
Note: the US Census treats Hispanic/Latino as an ethnic category. This table excludes Latinos from the racial categories and assigns them to a separate category. Hispanics/Latinos may be of any race.

Race / ethnicity (NH = non-Hispanic)	Pop. 1980	Pop. 1990	Pop. 2000	Pop. 2010	Pop. 2020
White alone (NH)	422,284 (91.84%)	420,949 (86.66%)	384,648 (75.27%)	340,194 (66.89%)	320,477 (58.02%)
Black or African American alone (NH)	14,494 (3.15%)	22,096 (4.55%)	37,978 (7.43%)	54,835 (10.78%)	70,101 (12.69%)
Native American or Alaska Native alone (NH)	2,993 (0.65%)	4,129 (0.85%)	3,677 (0.72%)	3,143 (0.62%)	2,914 (0.53%)
Asian alone (NH)	5,402 (1.17%)	24,209 (4.98%)	44,633 (8.73%)	59,033 (11.61%)	85,775 (15.53%)
Pacific Islander alone (NH)	—	—	284 (0.06%)	195 (0.04%)	214 (0.04%)
Other race alone (NH)	5,301 (1.15%)	492 (0.10%)	803 (0.16%)	737 (0.15%)	2,339 (0.42%)
Mixed race or multiracial (NH)	—	—	12,033 (2.35%)	14,020 (2.76%)	25,498 (4.62%)
Hispanic or Latino (any race)	9,310 (2.02%)	13,890 (2.86%)	26,979 (5.28%)	36,483 (7.17%)	45,034 (8.15%)
Total	459,784 (100.00%)	485,765 (100.00%)	511,035 (100.00%)	508,640 (100.00%)	552,352 (100.00%)

=== 2020 census ===
As of the 2020 census, the county had a population of 552,352. The median age was 35.6 years. 22.7% of residents were under the age of 18 and 15.4% of residents were 65 years of age or older. For every 100 females there were 94.9 males, and for every 100 females age 18 and over there were 92.2 males age 18 and over.

The racial makeup of the county was 59.6% White, 12.9% Black or African American, 0.8% American Indian and Alaska Native, 15.6% Asian, <0.1% Native Hawaiian and Pacific Islander, 4.0% from some other race, and 7.1% from two or more races. Hispanic or Latino residents of any race comprised 8.2% of the population.

100.0% of residents lived in urban areas, while <0.1% lived in rural areas.

There were 218,077 households in the county, of which 27.8% had children under the age of 18 living in them. Of all households, 39.9% were married-couple households, 20.9% were households with a male householder and no spouse or partner present, and 31.0% were households with a female householder and no spouse or partner present. About 33.3% of all households were made up of individuals and 12.1% had someone living alone who was 65 years of age or older.

There were 228,546 housing units, of which 4.6% were vacant. Among occupied housing units, 57.5% were owner-occupied and 42.5% were renter-occupied. The homeowner vacancy rate was 0.8% and the rental vacancy rate was 4.9%.

=== 2010 census ===
As of the 2010 census, there were 508,640 people, 202,691 households, and 117,799 families residing in the county. The population density was 3,341.7 inhabitants per square mile (1,290.2/km^{2}). There were 217,196 housing units at an average density of 1,426.9 per square mile (550.9/km^{2}). The racial makeup of the county was 70.10% White, 11.04% African American, 0.79% Native American, 11.66% Asian, 0.05% Pacific Islander, 2.91% from some other races and 3.45% from two or more races. Hispanic or Latino people of any race were 7.17% of the population.

=== 2000 census ===
At the 2000 census, there were 511,035 people, 201,236 households, and 119,936 families residing in the county. The population density was 3,275.9 inhabitants per square mile (1,264.8/km^{2}). There were 206,448 housing units at an average density of 1,323.4 per square mile (511.0/km^{2}). The racial makeup of the county was 77.37% White, 7.61% African American, 0.83% Native American, 8.77% Asian, 0.06% Pacific Islander, 2.45% from some other races and 2.90% from two or more races. Hispanic or Latino people of any race were 5.28% of the population.

There were 201,236 households, out of which 29.80% had children under the age of 18 living with them, 44.00% were married couples living together, 11.90% had a female householder with no husband present, and 40.40% were non-families. 32.00% of all households were made up of individuals, and 9.50% had someone living alone who was 65 years of age or older. The average household size was 2.45 and the average family size was 3.16.

In the county the population was spread out with 25.60% under the age of 18, 11.30% from 18 to 24, 30.70% from 25 to 44, 20.70% from 45 to 64, and 11.60% who were 65 years of age or older. The median age was 34 years. For every 100 females there were 93.00 males. For every 100 females age 18 and over, there were 89.20 males.

The median income for a household in the county was $45,722, and the median income for a family was $57,747. Males had a median income of $39,806 versus $30,814 for females. The per capita income for the county was $23,536. About 7.40% of families and 10.60% of the population were below the poverty line, including 15.70% of those under age 18 and 6.80% of those age 65 or over.

== Communities ==
=== Cities ===
- Arden Hills
- Blaine (partial)
- Falcon Heights
- Gem Lake
- Lauderdale
- Little Canada
- Maplewood
- Mounds View
- New Brighton
- North Oaks
- North Saint Paul
- Roseville
- Saint Paul (county seat)
- Shoreview
- Spring Lake Park (partial)
- Saint Anthony (partial)
- Vadnais Heights
- White Bear Lake (partial)

=== Townships ===
- McLean Township (defunct)
- Mounds View Township (defunct)
- New Canada Township (defunct)
- Reserve Township (defunct)
- Rose Township (defunct)
- White Bear Township

=== Unincorporated communities ===
- Bald Eagle
- Bellaire

== Education ==
School districts include:

- Mounds View Public Schools
- North St. Paul-Maplewood-Oakdale School District
- Roseville Area Schools
- St. Anthony-New Brighton School District
- Saint Paul Public Schools
- White Bear Lake Area School District

Charter schools include:

- Hmong College Prep Academy
- Metro Deaf School

== See also ==
- Ramsey County Library
- National Register of Historic Places listings in Ramsey County, Minnesota
