= Birchwood Village, Minnesota =

City in Minnesota, United States

Birchwood Village
- City
- Location of the city of Birchwood Village within Washington County, Minnesota
- Coordinates: 45°03′36″N 92°58′40″W
- Country: United States
- State: Minnesota
- County: Washington

Area
  - Total: 0.34 sq mi (0.89 km^{2})
  - Land: 0.33 sq mi (0.86 km^{2})
  - Water: 0.0077 sq mi (0.02 km^{2})
- Elevation: 991 ft (302 m)

Population (2020)
  - Total: 863
  - Estimate (2021): 857
  - Density: 2,586.3/sq mi (998.56/km^{2})
- Time zone: UTC-6 (CST)
  - Summer (DST): UTC-5 (CDT)
- ZIP code: 55110
- Area code: 651
- FIPS code: 27-06058
- GNIS feature ID: 2394171
- Website: cityofbirchwood.com

Birchwood Village is a city in Washington County, Minnesota, United States. The population was 863 at the 2020 census.

== Geography ==
According to the United States Census Bureau, the city has a total area of 0.34 square miles (0.88 km^{2}), all land. Cedar Street / Hall Avenue serves as a main route. The village is on the south and east shore of White Bear Lake.

== History ==
Birchwood first developed as a community of summer recreation cottages built by residents of the Saint Paul area in early 20th-century. Initial subdivisions were along the lakeshore, and this area is now characterized by a potpourri of old homes that have been extensively remodeled, and new homes where the original structure has been demolished. The newer subdivisions away from the lake have larger lots and are more homogeneous in appearance but have retained the flavor of the village by preserving the natural features of the area.

The community was at one time served by the Twin City Lines street car which passed through the village on its way from Saint Paul to White Bear Lake and Mahtomedi. The significant difference in lot sizes between the older and newer areas of the community reflect the influence of changes in transportation modes.

First incorporated as a village in the year 1921, a subsequent act of the State Legislature converted the "village" to a "City of the Fourth Class." Residents felt, however, that the term "village" was so much a part of the community that it was amended to "Birchwood Village, a City of the Fourth Class."

== Demographics ==
Historical population
| Census | Pop. | Note | %± |
|---|---|---|---|
| 1930 | 99 | | — |
| 1940 | 91 | | −8.1% |
| 1950 | 312 | | 242.9% |
| 1960 | 598 | | 91.7% |
| 1970 | 926 | | 54.8% |
| 1980 | 1,059 | | 14.4% |
| 1990 | 1,042 | | −1.6% |
| 2000 | 968 | | −7.1% |
| 2010 | 870 | | −10.1% |
| 2020 | 863 | | −0.8% |
| 2021 (est.) | 857 | | −0.7% |
U.S. Decennial Census; 2020 Census

=== 2020 Census and the 2024 American Community Survey (ACS) 5-year estimates ===
Based on the latest reports from the 2020 Census and the 2024 American Community Survey (ACS) 5-year estimates, the City of Birchwood Village has seen a notable increase in household income and a slight decline in total population.

Population and Housing: As of the most recent data, there were 863 to 866 people and 339 households in the city. • Population Density: 2,595.3 inhabitants per square mile. • Housing Units: There are approximately 358 housing units with an average density of 1,052.9 per square mile. • Homeownership: The homeownership rate is high at 86.7%, with a median property value of $462,800.

Income and Poverty (2024 Estimates): The city’s economic profile has shifted significantly upward since 2000: • Median Household Income: $156,563 (nearly double the 2000 figure of $81,941). • Per Capita Income: $85,096. • Poverty Rate: Approximately 2.66% to 4.9% of the population lives below the poverty line. • Household Income Breakdown: o 44% of households earn between $100,000 and $200,000. o 29% of households earn over $200,000.

Demographics and Diversity: While still predominantly White, the city's racial and ethnic composition has become slightly more diverse: • White: 88% • Hispanic or Latino: 6% (an increase from 0.52% in 2000) • Two or More Races: 7% • Asian / Black / Native American: <1% combined (reported as 0% in some specific Census Reporter datasets).

Age and Household Structure: The community has aged, but also shows a strong presence of families: • Median Age: 41.4 years (down from the 2010 peak of 49.1, but reflecting a stable adult population). • Marital Status: 65% of males and 63% of females are married. • Education: 64.9% of residents hold a Bachelor’s degree or higher, which is significantly higher than the Minnesota state average of 39.4%.

Comparison: 2000 vs. 2024 (Estimated) Category 2000 Census 2024 Estimates—Total Population 968 863; Median Household Income $81,941 $156,563; Median Property Value N/A $462,800; Bachelor's Degree+ N/A 64.9%; Hispanic or Latino % 0.52% 6.0%

=== 2010 Census ===
As of the census of 2010, there were 870 people, 351 households, and 262 families living in the city. The population density was 2,558.8 inhabitants per square mile (988.0/km2). There were 367 housing units at an average density of 1,079.4 per square mile (416.8/km2). The racial makeup of the city was 97.8% White, 0.6% African American, 0.7% Asian, 0.3% from other races, and 0.6% from two or more races. Hispanic or Latino of any race were 1.5% of the population.

There were 351 households, of which 25.1% had children under the age of 18 living with them, 64.7% were married couples living together, 6.8% had a female householder with no husband present, 3.1% had a male householder with no wife present, and 25.4% were non-families. 20.5% of all households were made up of individuals, and 9.4% had someone living alone who was 65 years of age or older. The average household size was 2.48 and the average family size was 2.85.

The median age in the city was 49.1 years. 20.7% of residents were under the age of 18; 6.1% were between the ages of 18 and 24; 16.2% were from 25 to 44; 38% were from 45 to 64; and 19% were 65 years of age or older. The gender makeup of the city was 47.1% male and 52.9% female.

=== 2000 census ===
As of the census of 2000, there were 968 people, 357 households, and 287 families living in the city. The population density was 2,808.2 inhabitants per square mile (1,084.3/km2). There were 366 housing units at an average density of 1,061.8 per square mile (410.0/km2). The racial makeup of the city was 98.45% White, 0.41% African American, 0.10% Native American, 0.62% Asian, and 0.41% from two or more races. Hispanic or Latino of any race were 0.52% of the population.

There were 357 households, out of which 35.3% had children under the age of 18 living with them, 72.0% were married couples living together, 5.0% had a female householder with no husband present, and 19.6% were non-families. 15.4% of all households were made up of individuals, and 6.2% had someone living alone who was 65 years of age or older. The average household size was 2.71 and the average family size was 3.03.

In the city, the population was spread out, with 26.4% under the age of 18, 5.5% from 18 to 24, 24.0% from 25 to 44, 32.0% from 45 to 64, and 12.1% who were 65 years of age or older. The median age was 42 years. For every 100 females, there were 98.0 males. For every 100 females age 18 and over, there were 101.1 males.

The median income for a household in the city was $81,941, and the median income for a family was $84,162. Males had a median income of $56,667 versus $36,563 for females. The per capita income for the city was $40,102. About 2.4% of families and 2.9% of the population were below the poverty line, including 4.8% of those under age 18 and none of those age 65 or over.
