= List of jails and prisons on the National Register of Historic Places =

This is an incomplete list of jails and prisons listed on the National Register of Historic Places. Included are:

== Alabama ==
- Houston Jail, Houston, Alabama, NRHP listed
- Old Jail (Gordo, Alabama), Gordo, Alabama, NRHP listed
- Coosa County Jail, Rockford, Alabama, NRHP listed

== Arkansas ==
- Old Gillett Jail, listed on the NRHP in Gillett, Arkansas County, Arkansas
- Benton County Jail listed on the NRHP in Bentonville, Benton County, Arkansas
- Boone County Jail listed on the NRHP in Harrison, Boone County, Arkansas
- Hermitage Jail listed on the NRHP in Hermitage, Bradley County, Arkansas
- Gurdon Jail listed on the NRHP in Gurdon, Clark County, Arkansas
- Columbia County Jail listed on the NRHP in Magnolia, Columbia County, Arkansas
- McGehee City Jail listed on the NRHP in McGehee, Desha County, Arkansas
- Faulkner County Jail listed on the NRHP in Conway, Faulkner County, Arkansas
- Franklin County Jail listed on the NRHP in Ozark, Franklin County, Arkansas
- Jackson County Jail listed on the NRHP in Newport, Jackson County, Arkansas
- Powhatan Jail listed on the NRHP in Powhatan, Lawrence County, Arkansas
- Cummins Prison Chapel listed on the NRHP in Cummins Unit, Lincoln County, Arkansas
- New Rocky Comfort Jail listed on the NRHP in Foreman, Little River County, Arkansas
- Magazine City Hall-Jail listed on the NRHP in Magazine, Logan County, Arkansas
- Old Logan County Jail listed on the NRHP in Paris, Logan County, Arkansas
- Flippin City Jail listed on the NRHP in Flippin, Marion County, Arkansas
- Prescott City Jail listed on the NRHP in Prescott, Nevada County, Arkansas
- Newton County Jail listed on the NRHP in Jasper, Newton County, Arkansas
- Scott City County Jail, (Old) listed on the NRHP in Waldron, Scott County, Arkansas
- Old Searcy County Jail listed on the NRHP in Marshall, Searcy County, Arkansas
- Old Sebastian County Jail listed on the NRHP in Greenwood, Sebastian County, Arkansas
- Old Huntington Jail listed on the NRHP in Huntington, Sebastian County, Arkansas
- Gillham City Jail listed on the NRHP in Gillham, Sevier County, Arkansas
- Washington County Jail listed on the NRHP in Fayetteville, Washington County, Arkansas
- Beebe Jail, listed on the NRHP in Beebe, White County, Arkansas
- McRae Jail, listed on the NRHP in McRae, White County, Arkansas
- Russell Jail, listed on the NRHP in Russell, White County, Arkansas

== Connecticut ==
- Fairfield County Jail, listed on the NRHP in Bridgeport, Connecticut

== Florida ==
- Old Hamilton County Jail, listed on the NRHP in Jasper, Florida
- Old St. Johns County Jail, listed on the NRHP in St. Augustine, Florida
- Old Taylor County Jail, listed on the NRHP in Perry, Florida

== Georgia ==
- Old Jail (Washington, Georgia), listed on the NRHP in Wilkes County
- Quitman County Courthouse and Old Jail, listed on the NRHP in Georgetown
- Rockdale County Jail in Conyers, Georgia, listed on the NRHP in Rockdale County

== Idaho ==
- Old Idaho State Penitentiary, in Boise

== Illinois ==
- Franklin County Jail (Illinois), listed on the NRHP in Illinois

== Indiana ==
- Montgomery County Jail and Sheriff's Residence

== Iowa ==
- Dubuque County Jail, listed on the NRHP in Iowa
- Old Jail (Muscatine, Iowa), listed on the NRHP in Iowa
- Pottawattamie County Jail, listed on the NRHP in Iowa
- Scott County Jail, listed on the NRHP in Iowa

== Kentucky ==
- Kentucky State Penitentiary, contributes to the Old Eddyville Historic District

== Louisiana ==
- Beauregard Parish Jail
- Old St. Helena Parish Jail, in Greensburg

== Massachusetts ==
- Charles Street Jail, listed on the NRHP in Boston, Massachusetts (North)
- Old Jail (Barnstable, Massachusetts), listed on the NRHP in Massachusetts

== Minnesota ==
- Aitkin County Courthouse and Jail, in Aitkin
- Crow Wing County Courthouse and Jail, in Brainerd
- Elizabeth Village Hall and Jail, in Elizabeth
- Fillmore County Jail and Carriage House, in Preston
- Houston County Courthouse and Jail, in Caledonia
- Le Sueur County Courthouse and Jail, in Le Center
- Lincoln County Courthouse and Jail, in Ivanhoe
- Minnesota Home School for Girls, in Sauk Centre
- Minnesota State Reformatory for Men Historic District, in St. Cloud
- Minnesota State Training School, in Red Wing
- Minnesota Territorial Prison, in Stillwater (demolished and delisted)
- Nicollet County Courthouse and Jail, in St. Peter
- Odessa Jail, in Odessa
- Park Rapids Jail, in Park Rapids
- Renville County Courthouse and Jail, in Olivia
- Rice County Courthouse and Jail, in Faribault
- Rock County Courthouse and Jail, in Luverne
- Sibley County Courthouse and Sheriff's Residence and Jail, in Gaylord
- State Prison Historic District, in Bayport
- Stearns County Courthouse and Jail, in St. Cloud (jail demolished)
- Todd County Courthouse, Sheriff's House, and Jail, in Long Prairie (jail demolished)
- Walters Jail, in Walters

== Missouri ==
- Daviess County Rotary Jail and Sheriff's Residence

== Montana ==
- Fallon County Jail, in Baker
- Belt Jail, listed on the NRHP in Belt, Montana
- Gallatin County Jail, listed on the NRHP in Bozeman, Montana
- Ismay Jail, in Custer County
- Montana State Prison, in Deer Lodge
- Lodge Grass City Jail, listed on the NRHP in Lodge Grass, Montana
- Granite County Jail, listed on the NRHP in Philipsburg, Montana
- Square Butte Jail, listed on the NRHP in Square Butte, Montana
- Sanders County Jail, listed on the NRHP in Thompson Falls, Montana
- Troy Jail, in Lincoln County

== Oregon ==
- Clatsop County Jail (Old), listed on the NRHP in Astoria, Oregon

== Pennsylvania ==
- Eastern State Penitentiary

== South Carolina ==
- Florence Stockade, in Florence County
- South Carolina Penitentiary, former listing (demolished)
- Oconee County Cage, in Walhalla
- Oconee County Jail, former listing (demolished)

== Tennessee ==
- Old Scott County Jail, listed on the NRHP in Huntsville, Tennessee
- Old Fentress County Jail, listed on the NRHP in Jamestown, Tennessee
- Lawrence County Jail, listed on the NRHP in Lawrenceburg, Tennessee
- Old Bedford County Jail, in Shelbyville
- Claiborne County Jail, in Tazewell
- Franklin County Jail (Tennessee), listed on the NRHP in Winchester, Tennessee
- Moore County Jail, Shares listing with county courthouse.

== Texas ==
- Austin County Jail, listed on the NRHP in Bellville, Texas
- Bowie County Jail, listed on the NRHP in Boston, Texas
- Old Cameron County Jail, listed on the NRHP in Brownsville, Texas
- Brown County Jail, listed on the NRHP in Brownwood, Texas
- Bosque County Jail, listed on the NRHP in Meridian, Texas
- Anderson County Jail, listed on the NRHP in Palestine, Texas
- Coke County Jail, listed on the NRHP in Robert Lee, Texas

== Virginia ==
- Old Fauquier County Jail, in Warrenton

== West Virginia ==
- West Virginia State Penitentiary, in Moundsville

== Wisconsin ==
- Kenosha County Courthouse and Jail, in Kenosha
- Marquette County Courthouse and Marquette County Sheriff's Office and Jail, in Montello
- New Glarus Town Hall, in Green County
- Pepin County Courthouse and Jail, in Durand

== Wyoming ==
- Clearmont Jail, in Sheridan County
- Wyoming Territorial Prison State Historic Site, in Laramie

== See also ==
- List of jail and prison museums
