= Old Jail =

Old Jail may refer to:

In the United States
(ordered by state and then city)

- Old Jail (Gordo, Alabama), listed on the National Register of Historic Places (NRHP) in Alabama
- Old Scott County Jail, in Waldron, Arkansas
- Old Hamilton County Jail, listed on the NRHP in Jasper, Florida
- Old Taylor County Jail, listed on the NRHP in Perry, Florida
- Old St. Johns County Jail, listed on the NRHP in St. Augustine, Florida
- Old Jail Museum (Conyers, Georgia), listed on the NRHP in Rockdale County, Georgia
- Quitman County Courthouse and Old Jail, listed on the NRHP in Georgetown, Georgia
- Old Jail (Washington, Georgia), NRHP-listed in Wilkes County
- Old Jail (Muscatine, Iowa), listed on the NRHP in Iowa
- Old St. Helena Parish Jail, listed on the NRHP in Greensburg, Louisiana
- Old Jail (Barnstable, Massachusetts), listed on the NRHP in Massachusetts
- Old Jail Museum (Chambersburg, Pennsylvania), listed on the NRHP in Franklin County, Pennsylvania
- Old Scott County Jail (Huntsville, Tennessee), listed on the NRHP in Huntsville, Tennessee
- Old Fentress County Jail, listed on the NRHP in Jamestown, Tennessee
- Old Jail (Sneedville, Tennessee), listed on the NRHP in Tennessee
- Old Cameron County Jail, listed on the NRHP in Brownsville, Texas

In the United Kingdom

- Old Jail, Biggin Hill, a pub in Biggin Hill, Westerham, Kent, England

== See also ==
- Old Gaol (disambiguation)
- Jails and prisons listed on the National Register of Historic Places
- List of jail and prison museums
