= Eddie Miles (American football) =

American football player (born 1968)

No. 94
- Position: Linebacker

Personal information
- Born: September 13, 1968 (age 58); Miami, Florida, U.S.
- Listed height: 6 ft 1 in (1.85 m)
- Listed weight: 233 lb (106 kg)

Career information
- High school: Miami Springs (Miami Springs, Florida)
- College: Minnesota
- NFL draft: 1990: 10th round, 266th overall pick

Career history
- Pittsburgh Steelers (1990); Atlanta Falcons (1991)*
- * Offseason or practice squad member only
- Stats at Pro Football Reference

Edmond Jamel Miles (born September 13, 1968) is an American former professional football linebacker who played one season with the Pittsburgh Steelers of the National Football League (NFL). He was selected by the Steelers in the tenth round of the 1990 NFL draft after playing college football at the University of Minnesota.

== Early life and college ==
Edmond Jamel Miles was born on September 13, 1968, in Miami, Florida. He attended Miami Springs Senior High School in Miami Springs, Florida and graduated in 1986.

Miles lettered for the Minnesota Golden Gophers from 1987 to 1989. He returned an interception 35 yards for a touchdown in 1989. He graduated from Minnesota with a bachelor’s degree in sociology and youth studies.

== Professional career ==
Miles was selected by the Pittsburgh Steelers in the tenth round, with the 266th overall pick, of the 1990 NFL draft. He officially signed with the team on July 10. He was released on September 4 but signed to the Steelers' practice squad on October 1. Miles was promoted to the active roster on October 5 and played in one game before being released on October 12. He was then re-signed to the practice squad on October 15, 1990. He became a free agent after the 1990 season.

Mile signed with the Atlanta Falcons on March 5, 1991. He was released on August 19, 1991.

== Post-playing career ==
Miles had wanted to be a prison warden since high school. In 1992, he began his career with the Minnesota Department of Corrections as a corrections officer at Minnesota Correctional Facility – Lino Lakes. He became an investigator with the Office of Special Investigations in 1997. In 2005, he became the program director at Minnesota Correctional Facility – Stillwater and also later served as associate warden of operations. In 2009, he became the warden at Lino Lakes. In 2011, he was named the warden at Minnesota Correctional Facility – St. Cloud.
