= Old Gaol =

Old Gaol may refer to:

- Albany Convict Gaol, a prison museum in Western Australia
- Buckingham Old Gaol, a museum in England
- Hexham Old Gaol, a museum in England
- Newcastle Gaol Museum, a prison museum in Toodyay, Western Australia
- Old Gaol Building (Grahamstown), in Eastern Cape, South Africa
- Old Gaol Building (Ingwavuma), in KwaZulu-Natal Province, South Africa
- Old Gaol, Roscommon, Ireland
- Old Melbourne Gaol, a museum in Australia
- Old York Gaol, a National Historic Landmark in Maine, United States
- Ottawa Jail Hostel, a hostel in Canada

== See also ==
- Gaol
- Old Jail (disambiguation)
