= CeCe McDonald =

American activist (born 1989)

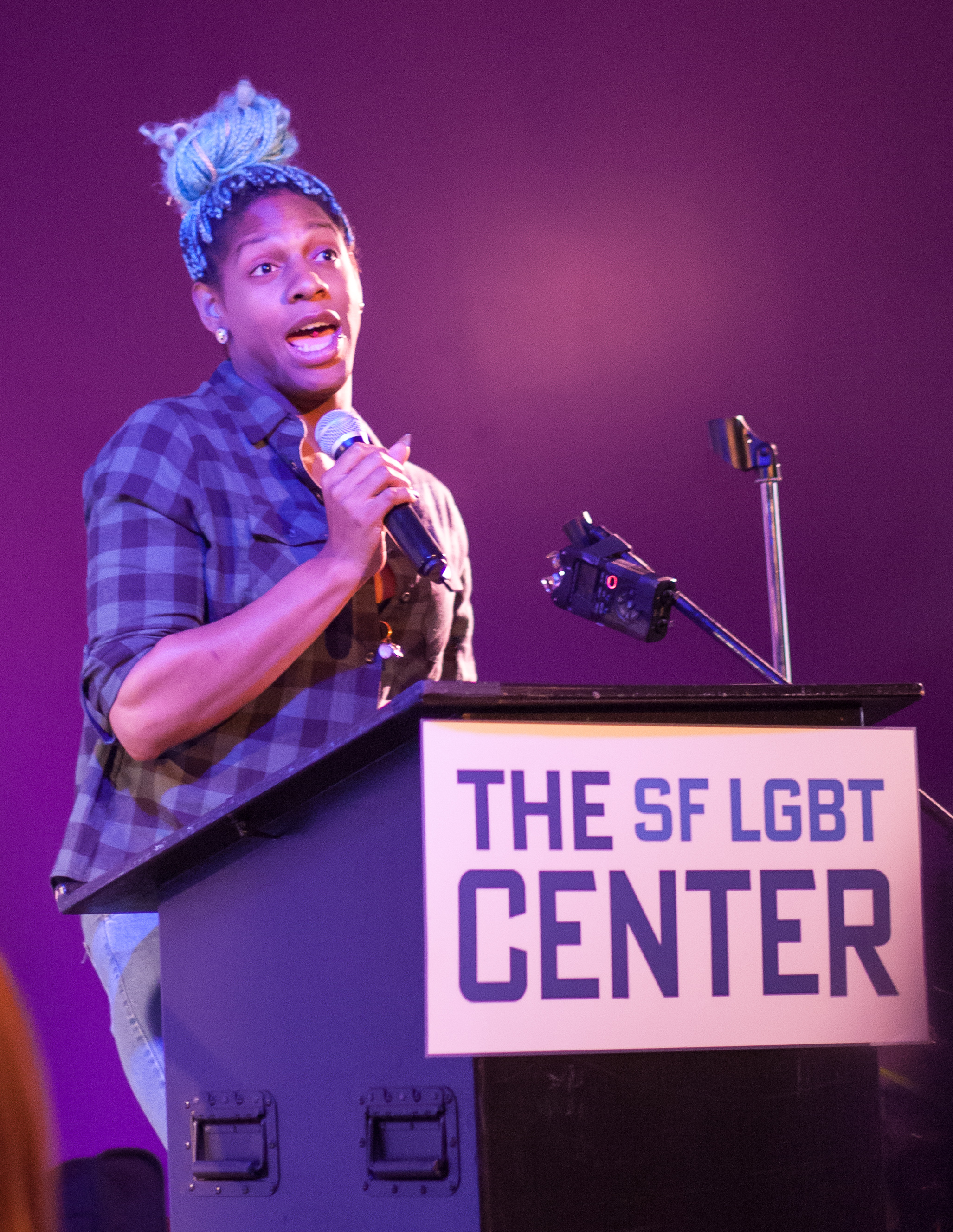
- McDonald in 2015
- Born: Chrishaun McDonald; May 26, 1989 (age 37); Chicago, Illinois, U.S.
- Known for: Manslaughter conviction, LGBTQ activism

CeCe McDonald (/ˌsiːˈsiː/; born May 26, 1989) is an American transgender activist convicted of second-degree manslaughter in the 2011 stabbing death of 47-year-old Dean Alvin Schmitz.

McDonald killed Schmitz during an altercation outside Schooner Tavern in South Minneapolis, which began with all three of the group Schmitz was part of shouting racist and transphobic epithets at McDonald (a Black trans woman) and her friends. The confrontation escalated into a fistfight after Schmitz's ex-girlfriend Molly Flaherty smashed a glass in McDonald's face, cutting her. McDonald was pulled away from Flaherty but then took a pair of scissors from her purse and stabbed Schmitz in the chest, killing him.

McDonald was charged with murder, but accepted a plea bargain and pleaded guilty to second-degree manslaughter with a sentence of 41 months. Some were outraged by the conviction, believing McDonald’s actions self-defense. McDonald was housed at MCF–St. Cloud, a men's prison. She was released in January 2014 after serving 19 months.

The case gained international attention when an Ebony article about the case won the 2013 GLAAD Media Award for "Outstanding Digital Journalism Article". Following her release, McDonald was profiled in many LGBTQ publications. The Advocate named her on its annual "40 Under 40" list, and the Harvey Milk Club presented her with its Bayard Rustin Civil Rights Award. In 2016, Laverne Cox and Jac Gares released a documentary FREE CeCe about her.

== Background ==
McDonald was born in South Chicago on 26 May 1989. She was drawn to femininity from a young age, and experienced physical abuse from her family and school peers for her femininity and sexuality. She fled her home at 14 after being physically assaulted by her uncle, and survived by dealing drugs, couch surfing and working as a child prostitute in Boystown, Chicago. She remained homeless until the age of 22. At the time of the killing, she was studying fashion design at the Minneapolis Community and Technical College.

== Killing of Dean Schmitz ==
=== Incident ===
Around 11:30 pm on June 5, 2011, McDonald was walking to the Cub Foods on Lake Street to buy groceries, alongside her roommate and three friends. They passed Schooner Tavern, where Dean Schmitz, his girlfriend Jenny Thoreson, and ex-girlfriend Molly Flaherty had stepped out for a cigarette shortly after midnight.

According to McDonald's testimony, Schmitz, Thoreson, and Flaherty shouted racial and transphobic slurs at her group. McDonald's friend, Larry Thomas recalled them saying "faggots" and "nigger lovers"; Thomas responded by approaching Schmitz, who walked off but then remarked, "oh, look at the tranny over there" and "look at that boy dressed like a girl and tucking her dick in". McDonald testified that she and her friends tried to walk away, but Flaherty started a fight, smashing an alcoholic glass in her face, causing a cut that required 11 stitches, and reportedly shouting "I can take on all of you bitches". Thoreson recalled Flaherty throwing the first punch. Flaherty's current boyfriend, David Crandell, stepped out of the bar to find multiple members of McDonald's group attacking her and tried to pull them away.

Gary Gilbert, a security worker at the Schooner Tavern, recalled seeing Schmitz pull McDonald away from Flaherty, and that Schmitz and McDonald then moved into the street: McDonald's defense characterized this as McDonald attempting to leave the scene but being followed by Schmitz. Gilbert recalled McDonald holding a blade (a pair of scissors) while Schmitz had his fists clenched. Schmitz said, "You gonna stab me, you bitch?" and was then stabbed in the chest, piercing his heart in the right ventricle. "You stabbed me," he said. "Yes, I did," McDonald replied. McDonald told police that Schmitz had charged her, and ran into the scissors. Schmitz died during the ambulance ride.

The fighting stopped when those present saw Schmitz bleeding. McDonald and Thomas ran towards Cub Foods, while some of their friends boarded a Metro Transit bus.

=== Arrest, confession and charges ===
In the parking lot of the grocery store, McDonald flagged down a police car, was arrested, and confessed to the stabbing, though subsequently claimed she had only confessed to cover for a different friend who had actually done it." Larry Thomas and Zavawn Smith also claimed that another friend, who they saw running away from the scene at the time, had admitted to stabbing Schmitz.

The office of Hennepin County Attorney Michael Freeman reviewed the evidence, including her taped confession, and charged McDonald with two counts of second-degree murder.

=== Pretrial hearings ===
Defense Attorney Hersch Izek of the Legal Rights Center took up McDonald’s case. Izek argued that McDonald stabbing Schmitz was self-defense and "reasonable when confronted with the reasonable possibility of bodily harm or death", citing her bleeding facial wound as reason to believe in such danger. Freeman disagreed, arguing that Schmitz was unarmed and did not clearly pose a threat to McDonald's life, who had a duty to retreat. He also noted that her story had changed, initially confessing to stabbing Schmitz but later claiming someone else had done so.

The defense intended to bring before the jury that Schmitz had faced more than two dozen criminal cases since turning 18; had convictions for fifth-degree assault and domestic assault; that methamphetamine and benzoylecgonine (a cocaine metabolite), which when combined can lead to unpredictable and unwarranted violence, were found in his system; and that he had a tattoo of a swastika on his chest. Schmitz's brother said Schmitz was not a racist, but that he had joined a white supremacist gang while in prison when he was younger. Freeman dismissed the tattoo as irrelevant, saying McDonald "couldn't see it, nor could anyone else ... It adds a little bit of sensationalism to the case, obviously."

On the first day of pretrial hearings, the prosecution disputed the admittance of Schmitz's swastika tattoo, arguing it was not relevant and was unfairly prejudicial. Judge Daniel Moreno ruled that Schmitz's tattoo and his three previous convictions for assault were not admissible as evidence of his alleged violent disposition, that McDonald's supporters could not wear "Free CeCe" T-shirts in court, and that the defense's toxicology expert could testify to the effects of methamphetamine and benzoylecgonine in general but not their effects on Schmitz on the night in question. Moreno also prevented an activist from testifying about the prevalence of violence against black trans women, and how it might have made McDonald fear for her life. Moreno permitted the prosecution's admittance of McDonald's prior statements on blogs and Facebook, and a motion to impeach McDonald's testimony, due to her previous conviction for writing a bad check.

=== Media and public response during pre-trial ===
In the aftermath of the stabbing, Schmitz's son, Jeremy Williams, described his father as always helping people and "an overall great person." In a letter from Hennepin County jail, McDonald wrote that "none of this mess wouldn't be happening if it weren't for the victim and his group being rude and disrespectful to people they never knew."

In April 2012, author Kate Bornstein spoke on MSNBC cable television program Melissa Harris-Perry, regarding self-defense issues, and compared McDonald's situation to George Zimmerman's in the aftermath of the killing of Trayvon Martin. The case attracted national attention from LGBTQ activists including author Leslie Feinberg, who wrote that "the right of self-defense against all forms of oppressions—the spirit of Stonewall—is at the heart of the demand to free her". Cam Gordon of the Minneapolis City Council announced his support for McDonald and called the incident "another example [of] transgender women of color being targeted for hate and bias-related violence", and Susan Allen, a member of the Minnesota House of Representatives, called on Freeman to consider the "extenuating circumstances" of McDonald's case. Transgender activist Laverne Cox, who plays Sophie Burset in Orange Is The New Black, stated that McDonald was the perfect image of the character, and said she identified with McDonald's experiences being harassed.

A May 2012 press release by McDonald's support committee said the sentencing proceedings included statements from community leaders, clergy, and members of McDonald's family. Supporters held dance parties and rallies outside the Hennepin County jail in McDonald's honor A Change.org petition calling for Freeman to drop McDonald's charges drew over 18,000 signatures. Katie Burgess, executive director of the Trans Youth Support Network said the growth in support for McDonald’s self-defense argument was due to the perception McDonald was "on trial for surviving a hate crime."

In June 2012, a group calling itself "Queer Attack Squadron" took responsibility for an incident where an unlit molotov cocktail was thrown through the window of a Wells Fargo bank in Portland, Oregon, claiming it was a gesture of solidarity with McDonald. Burgess said the attack had no connection to McDonald's supporters in Minneapolis.

=== Plea bargain (May 2012) ===
Days before the trial was to begin, Moreno offered a plea bargain: charges of second-degree murder would be reduced to second-degree manslaughter, and McDonald would have to admit only to criminal negligence rather than murder. On May 2, 2012, the defense and prosecution agreed on a 41-month sentence, the minimum sentence for second-degree manslaughter, as a compromise. In accepting the plea deal, McDonald had to relinquish the argument that she killed Schmitz in self-defense or by accident, and had to forego a trial by jury. McDonald said she accepted the plea deal for the sake of her loved ones, as it would result in her freed in matter of years rather than potentially decades. On June 4, 2012, Moreno sentenced McDonald to 41 months in prison, gave her credit for 245 days' jail time, and required payment of $6,410 in restitution for Schmitz's funeral expenses.

=== Imprisonment ===
While awaiting trial, McDonald had been held in segregated custody and spent time under house arrest. In May 2012, Michael Friedman of the Legal Rights Center, and Katie Burgess, both acknowledged that said there was "no way" McDonald would be "sent to a women's prison" and that there was “really no history of transgender people being placed according to their gender identity." After being sentenced, McDonald expressed resignation saying, "I've faced worse things in my life than prison."

A spokeswoman for the Minnesota Department of Corrections said officials had decided to place McDonald in an adult male facility, the Minnesota Correctional Facility – St. Cloud, though the final destination had yet to be determined and the state would make its own determination of McDonald's gender. The state's gender assessment concluded that McDonald would be held in a men's facility. During her imprisonment a petition caused the Department of Corrections to administer the correct regimen of hormones. Despite being transferred to a second facility, McDonald remained quartered with men throughout her imprisonment.

=== Flaherty assault case ===
In May 2012, Molly Flaherty was charged with second-degree assault with a deadly weapon and third-degree assault causing substantial bodily harm for attacking McDonald with "an alcoholic drink" glass that caused a wound requiring eleven stitches. Her case was referred to the Washington County Attorney's Office in order to avoid a conflict of interest. In April 2013, Flaherty pleaded guilty to third-degree assault and was sentenced to six months' jail time and probation, and was given credit for 135 days served in jail.

== Post-incarceration ==
Chase Strangio, a staff attorney for the American Civil Liberties Union, described McDonald's release a day to celebrate. McDonald was described as in good spirits but not ready to comment publicly, though she did a first televised interview six days later on Melissa Harris-Perry on MSNBC. She said that prisons weren’t safe for anyone, with Katie Burgess adding that "the only way that trans folks are going to be safe in prisons is for incarceration of people to end."

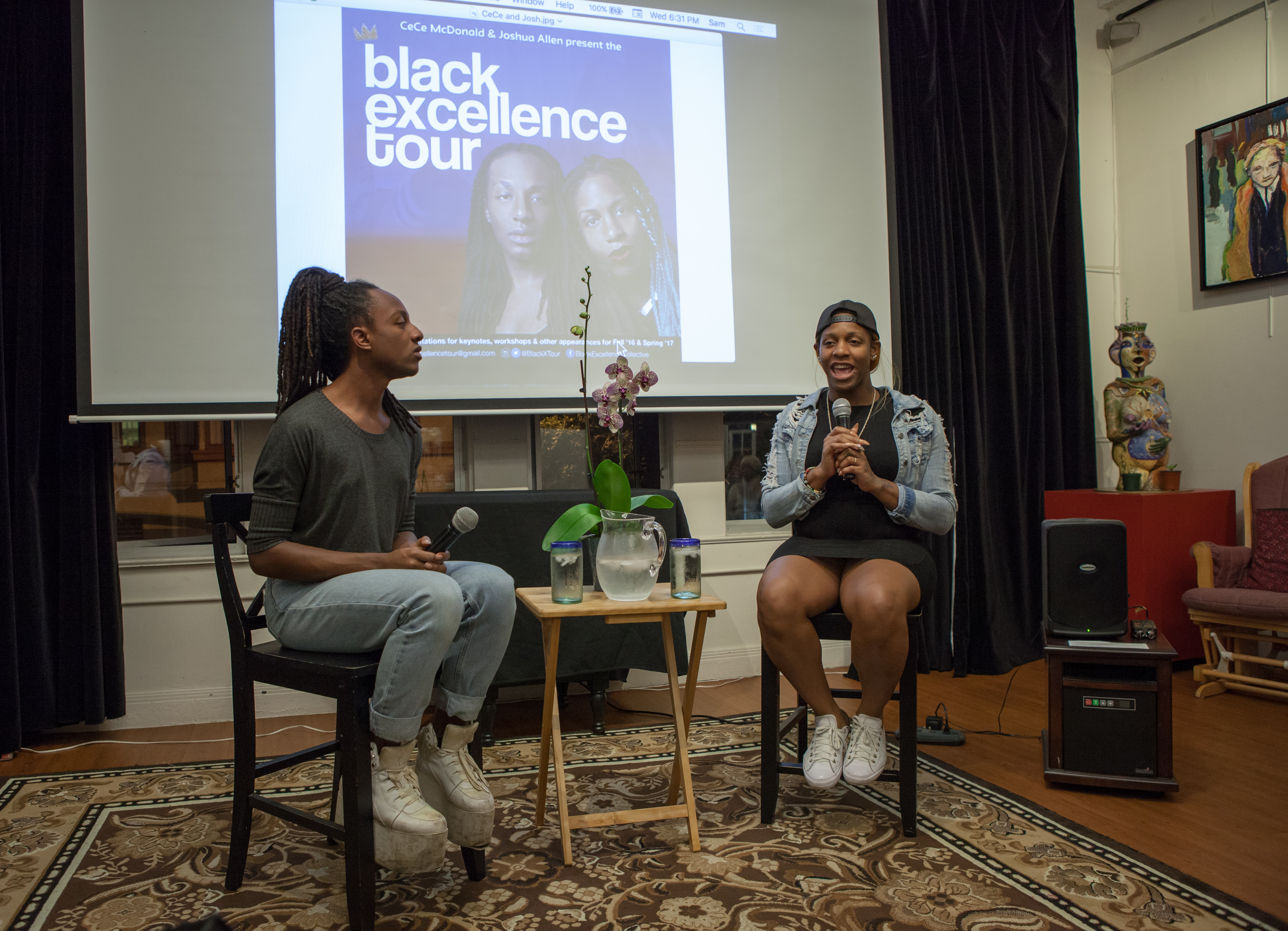
McDonald with activist Joshua Allen on their Black Excellence Tour.

In 2014, McDonald was profiled by Rolling Stone, included as part of the Advocate's annual "40 Under 40" list, and awarded the Bayard Rustin Civil Rights Award by the Harvey Milk LGBT Democratic Club.

In 2016, FREE CeCe, a documentary about McDonald directed by New York filmmaker Jac Gares, who raised $300,000 to fund it, and Laverne Cox as executive producer, was the kick-off film at the 2016 San Francisco Transgender Film Festival. The film consists of Cox interviewing McDonald on the killing, her imprisonment, and the violence experienced by trans women of color.

Also in 2016, McDonald teamed up with non-binary activist and prison abolitionist Joshua Allen for a Black Excellence Tour. In winter 2021, McDonald alongside community organizer Elle Hearns took part in a virtual discussion entitled "Black Trans Lives Matter" presented by the University of California, Santa Barbara Multicultural Center.

== See also ==
- Crime in Minnesota
- LGBT people in prison
- List of acts of violence against LGBT people
- Manslaughter (United States law)
- Violence against transgender people in the United States
