= Warden's House Museum =

Historic house in Minnesota, United States

- Minnesota Territorial/State Prison Warden's House
- U.S. National Register of Historic Places
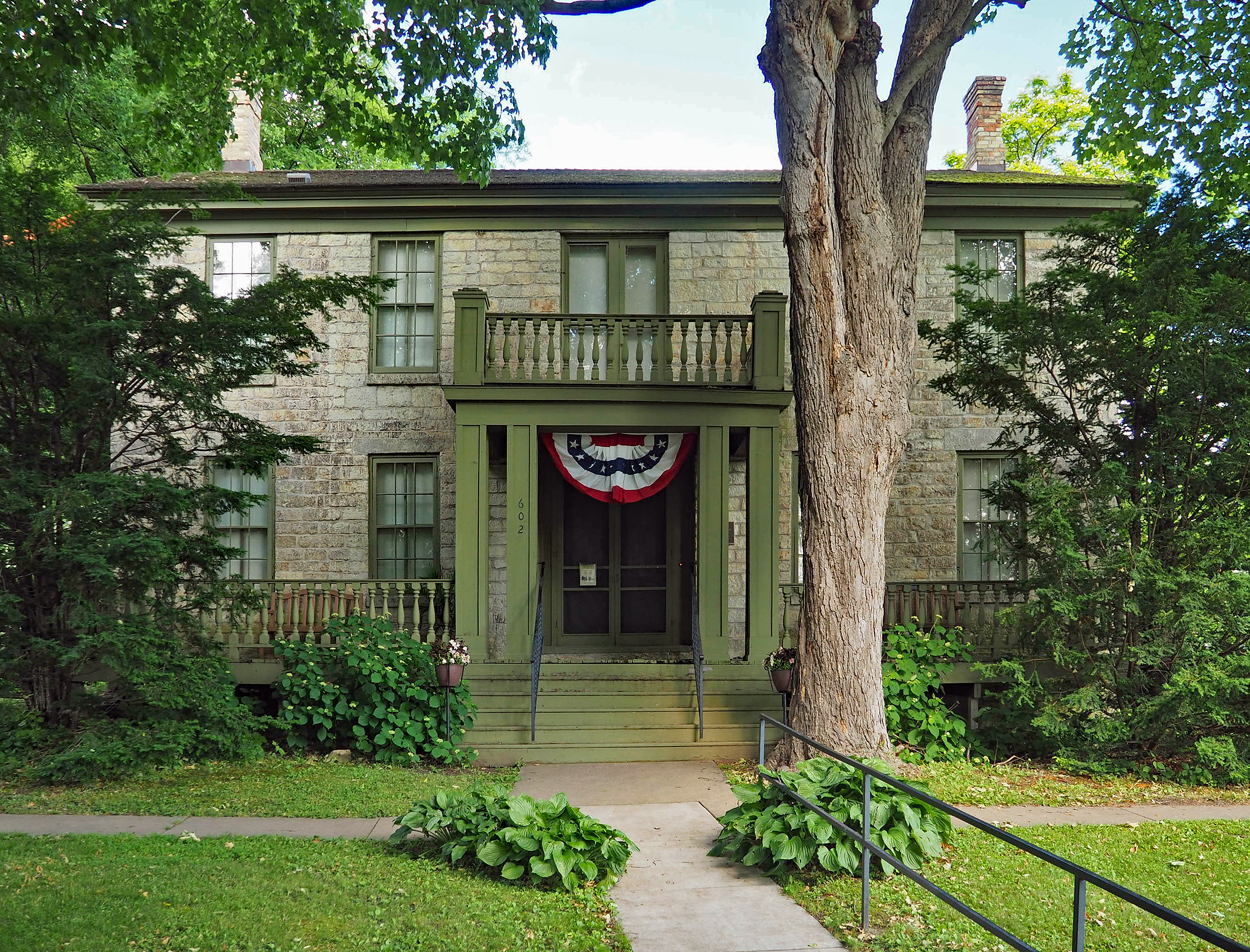
- The Warden's House from the east

- Location within Minnesota Location within the United States
- Interactive map showing the location of Warden’s House
- Location: 602 North Main Street, Stillwater, Minnesota
- Coordinates: 45°3′42″N 92°48′27″W
- Area: 1 acre (0.40 ha)
- Built: 1853
- Built by: Jesse Taylor Company
- Architect: Jacob Fisher
- Architectural style: Greek Revival/Federal
- MPS: Washington County MRA (AD)
- NRHP reference No.: 74001044
- Designated: December 17, 1974

The Warden's House Museum is a historic house museum in Stillwater, Minnesota, United States. From 1853 to 1914 it was the official residence for the wardens of what began as the Minnesota Territorial Prison and became the Minnesota State Prison upon statehood in 1858. The Washington County Historical Society has operated the house since 1941, making it the second-oldest house museum in Minnesota. It was listed on the National Register of Historic Places in 1974 as the Minnesota Territorial/State Prison Warden's House for its state-level significance in the themes of architecture and social history. It was nominated for being the only surviving structure of the prison's Minnesota Territory period and the chief remnant of its statehood years.

== Description ==
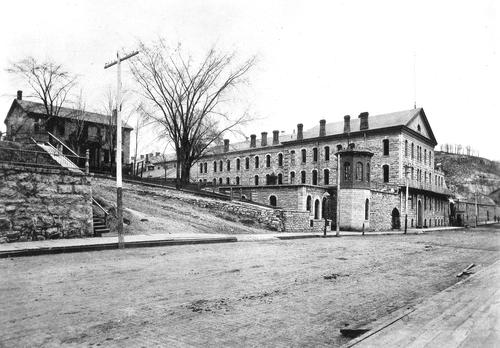
The Warden's House seen adjacent to the prison in 1885

The Warden's House is a two-story building constructed of local limestone. The house is oriented broadside to the east, with a shallow pitched roof and low gables on the north and south end. Architecturally it conveys an early Greek Revival style but with Federal influences. Wood-frame additions were added to the rear in 1870. The house originally had a full-width balcony along the front, which was replaced in 1910 with a two-story porch topped with a gable. Since the building's 1974 National Register nomination, this porch has been replaced with a smaller balcony-topped porch hugging the main entrance.

There was originally a two-story frame carriage house behind the main house, but it was demolished around the time the prison ceased operation in 1914.

== History ==
The Warden's House was part of the original construction for the Minnesota Territorial Prison. It stood outside the walls on a bluff overlooking the prison complex, which was located immediately to the north within a ravine. The prison was in operation for 61 years, from 1853 to 1914. In that time 13 successive wardens resided in the house, serving terms as short as five months to as long as 20 years. The first two wardens were appointed by the territorial legislature, then, for the first 40 years of statehood, by the Governor of Minnesota with State Senate confirmation. In 1889, to quell political favoritism in the choices, legislation assigned the selection of wardens to a five-person board of managers.

The original prison complex closed in 1914 upon the completion of a new Minnesota State Prison just south of Stillwater in Bayport. The Warden's House then served as quarters for lesser officials like deputy wardens and superintendents. Most of the prison complex was demolished in 1936. The Warden's House was preserved and transferred to the Washington County Historical Society in 1941.

== Museum ==
The Warden's House Museum consists of 14 rooms, which have been restored to late-19th and early-20th-century style. Some depict how the house would have looked during its occupancy by various wardens, while others contain exhibits on Washington County history. Some rooms in the museum house artifacts from the lumbering industry, early Stillwater pioneers, and items belonging to the Younger Brothers of the Frank and Jesse James Gang. The Warden's House Museum is the only museum in the city of Stillwater.

== See also ==
- List of museums in Minnesota
- National Register of Historic Places listings in Washington County, Minnesota
