= National Register of Historic Places listings in Taylor County, Florida =

Location of Taylor County in Florida

This is a list of the National Register of Historic Places listings in Taylor County, Florida. The locations of National Register properties for which the latitude and longitude coordinates are included below, may be seen in a map.

There are 4 properties listed on the National Register in the county.

This National Park Service list is complete through NPS recent listings posted March 13, 2026.

Contents: Counties in Florida (non-linked contain no National Register listings)
Alachua - Baker - Bay - Bradford - Brevard - Broward - Calhoun - Charlotte - Citrus - Clay - Collier - Columbia - DeSoto - Dixie - Duval - Escambia - Flagler - Franklin - Gadsden - Gilchrist - Glades - Gulf - Hamilton - Hardee - Hendry - Hernando - Highlands - Hillsborough (Tampa) - Holmes - Indian River - Jackson - Jefferson - Lafayette - Lake - Lee - Leon - Levy - Liberty - Madison - Manatee - Marion - Martin - Miami-Dade (Miami) - Monroe - Nassau - Okaloosa - Okeechobee - Orange - Osceola - Palm Beach - Pasco - Pinellas - Polk - Putnam - St. Johns - St. Lucie - Santa Rosa - Sarasota - Seminole - Sumter - Suwannee - Taylor - Union - Volusia - Wakulla - Walton - Washington

== Current listings ==
	Name on the Register	Image	Date listed	Location	City or town	Description
1	First Methodist Episcopal Church, South	First Methodist Episcopal Church, South	October 19, 2015 (#15000210)	302 N. Jefferson St. 30°07′08″N 83°34′55″W	Perry	
2	Mittendorf House	Mittendorf House	September 27, 2021 (#100007050)	803 Riverside Dr. 29°40′12″N 83°22′53″W	Steinhatchee	
3	Old Perry Post Office	Old Perry Post Office	May 11, 1989 (#89000404)	201 East Green Street; 30°07′00″N 83°34′51″W	Perry	
4	Old Taylor County Jail	Old Taylor County Jail	May 11, 1989 (#89000414)	400 block of North Washington Street; 30°07′12″N 83°34′53″W	Perry	

== See also ==
- List of National Historic Landmarks in Florida
- National Register of Historic Places listings in Florida
