= Minnesota Correctional Facility – St. Cloud =

Prison in Minnesota, United States

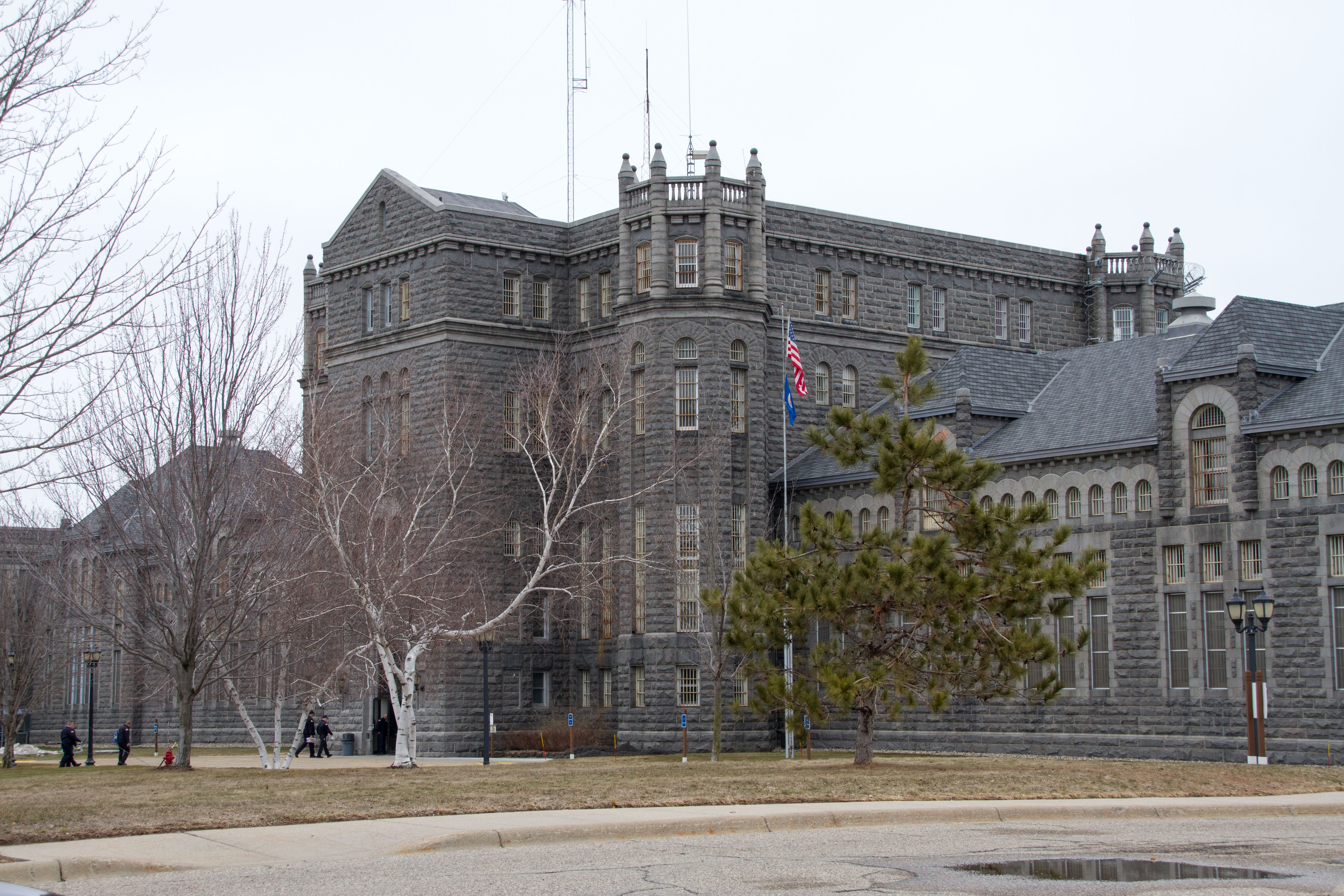
- Main entrance of the Minnesota Correctional Facility – St. Cloud
- Interactive map of Minnesota Correctional Facility – St. Cloud
- Location: St. Cloud, Minnesota, United States; 45°32′35″N 94°7′0″W
- Status: Operational
- Security class: Level 4–"Close Custody"
- Population: 909 (January 16, 2024)
- Opened: 1889
- Managed by: Minnesota Department of Corrections
- Warden: Jesse Pugh
- Website: https://mn.gov/doc/facilities/st-cloud/
- Minnesota State Reformatory for Men Historic District
- U.S. National Register of Historic Places
- U.S. Historic district
- Area: 65 acres (26 ha)
- Built: 1887–1933
- Architect: J. Walter Stevens, Clarence H. Johnston Sr.
- Architectural style: Tudor Revival, Romanesque Revival
- NRHP reference No.: 86001671
- Added to NRHP: July 17, 1986

Minnesota Correctional Facility – St. Cloud (MCF-St. Cloud) is a state prison in St. Cloud, Minnesota, United States. Established in 1889 as the Minnesota State Reformatory for Men, it is a level four, close-security institution with an inmate population of about 1,000 men. MCF-St. Cloud serves as the intake facility for men committed to prison in Minnesota.

The Minnesota State Reformatory for Men Historic District was listed on the National Register of Historic Places in 1986 for its state-level significance in the themes of architecture and social history. The listing comprises 23 contributing properties built 1887–1933 with granite quarried by inmates. The prison was nominated for its architectural cohesion and for its associations with prison reform and Minnesota's quarrying industry.

== History ==
The prison, originally named the Minnesota State Reformatory for Men, was Minnesota's third prison. The Minnesota Territorial Prison was established in Stillwater in 1853. In 1867, a second institution, the House of Refuge, opened in Saint Paul to house young offenders. The House of Refuge was renamed to the Minnesota State Reform School in 1879, and it moved to Red Wing in 1890. Later, in 1895, it was renamed the Minnesota State Training School. The State Reformatory for Men was intended as an intermediate facility between the State Training School and the Territorial Prison. It was created as a reformatory for offenders between sixteen and thirty years old who were presumed salvageable from a life of crime.

The first cell block, a four-story Romanesque Revival structure designed by J. Walter Stevens, was completed in 1889. A second cell block, also designed by Stevens, was built by inmates who quarried granite from an on-site quarry. In 1897, work was started on the Romanesque/Medieval-style Administration Building. The building was designed by Clarence H. Johnston Sr., who designed several other structures for state institutions. Due to several work stoppages, the Administration Building was not completed until 1920. The building, five stories tall, is built of granite and has a flat roof with octagonal corner towers. The wall was built by prisoners brought over from the Stillwater prison and remains the second largest wall built by prisoners. The quarry that the stone came from is the oldest granite quarry in Minnesota.

Johnston designed other buildings at the Reformatory, including other cell blocks, the north and south dining halls, infirmary, power plant building, maintenance shops, guard towers, and some school and trade buildings. The most imposing structure is the perimeter wall, a 22-foot (6.7 m) high granite wall on the outside perimeter. Historian Denis Gardner writes, "[The granite barrier] all but shouted to those on the outside to be good citizens or else."

License plate stamping was done here for many years until 2008 in which license plates were no longer stamped but printed and that process was brought to another prison. During the first decades the prison was built, upon release, it was standard to issue you a horse, saddle, rifle, and a gold piece.

== Notable inmates ==
- Nicholas Firkus
- CeCe McDonald, trans woman convicted of second degree manslaughter
- Jerry Westrom

== See also ==
- List of jails and prisons on the National Register of Historic Places
- List of Minnesota state prisons
- National Register of Historic Places listings in Sherburne County, Minnesota
