= Minnesota Correctional Facility – Lino Lakes =

Prison in Minnesota, United States

Coordinates: 45°10′38″N 93°07′32″W

- Interactive map of Minnesota Correctional Facility – Lino Lakes
- Location: 7525 Fourth Avenue Lino Lakes, Minnesota
- Status: open
- Security class: medium
- Capacity: 1300
- Opened: 1963 / 1978
- Managed by: Minnesota Department of Corrections
- Warden: Eddie Miles

The Minnesota Correctional Facility – Lino Lakes (MCF-LL) is a state prison located in Lino Lakes, Minnesota, USA.

The facility was original built in 1963 as a juvenile facility housing both boys and girls. In 1978 it was remodeled to become a medium security (Custody Level 3) facility for adult male inmates. The original juvenile cottages formed the basis of a "campus style" prison with more than a dozen one- or two-story buildings now stretched out across the property, fenced in by a high-security double fence topped with razor wire.

Buildings range from three of the five original cottages to a new, state-of-the-art K-shaped building that can house 400 offenders. Also on campus is a school and library for offenders working toward a GED or in the adult basic education program. Health Services, a gymnasium, administration, physical plant, chow hall/kitchen, and other housing/treatment units make up the remainder of the buildings.

The prison has no prison industry. Many of the approximately 1,300 inmates are in one of three main types of treatment programs. Sex offender, chemical dependency, and the faith-based Prison Fellowship Academy are the three main programs. In addition, Lino Lakes is the intake facility for most of the state's release violators returning to prison after violating the conditions of their original release. Many will serve for an additional 30–365 days as a consequence for violating. There is also a small unit that houses and provides therapy for "special needs" offenders who are cognitively disabled and/or significantly mentally ill. There are also some offenders who are not release violators or involved in treatment/therapy. These offenders mostly work full-time in support jobs such as cooks, janitors (swampers), maintenance, grounds crew, etc.

The Sex Offender Treatment Program (SOTP) treats and houses 300 of the state's sex offenders. The program takes two or more years to complete and includes a yearlong chemical dependency treatment program for sex offenders with chemical dependency issues.

The Triad unit houses and provides chemical dependency treatment to 293 offenders. Triad offers a "therapeutic community" approach to treatment. Triad is also home to the "Special Needs" program.

The InnerChange Freedom Initiative (IFI) is run and staffed by Prison Fellowship, an organization started by former Nixon chief counsel Chuck Colson. While ostensibly open to members of all faiths, it is a Christ centric approach to reentry/rehabilitation for felony offenders.

== Notable inmates ==
- David Brom
