= Old Huntington Jail =

- U.S. National Register of Historic Places
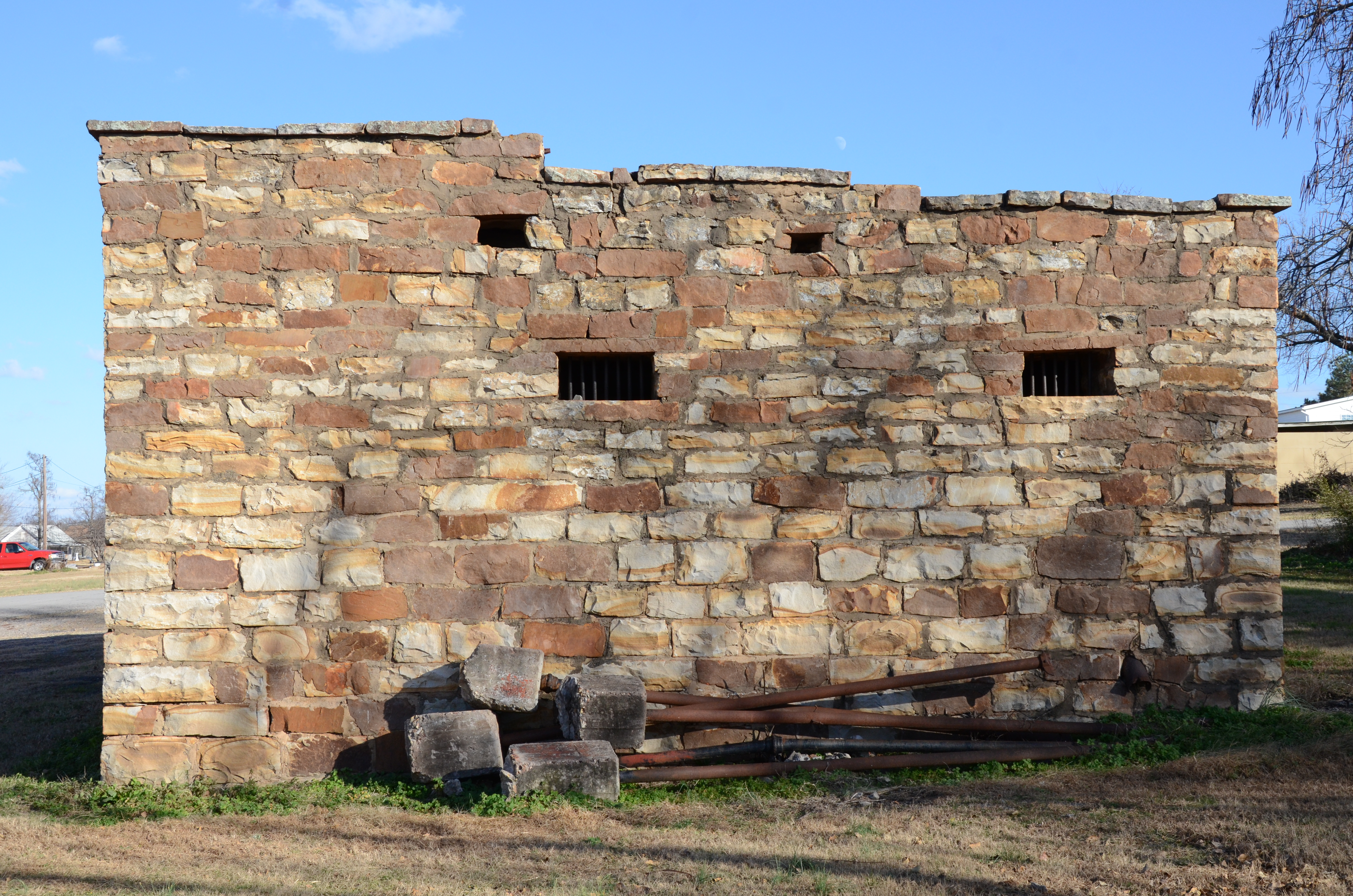

- Location within Arkansas Location within the United States
- Location: 223 East Broadway St., Huntington, Arkansas
- Coordinates: 35°5′1″N 94°15′40″W
- Area: less than one acre
- Built: 1888
- Architectural style: Plain Traditional
- NRHP reference No.: 08000944
- Added to NRHP: September 24, 2008

The Old Huntington Jail is a historic jail at 223 East Broadway in Huntington, Arkansas. It is a single-story stone structure, fashioned out of courses of cut stone. It was built in 1888 by the Kansas and Texas Coal Company, a mining concern that platted and founded Huntington in 1887. The interior has a central access space with two small cells on the right, and one large one on the left. The jail was in active use into the mid-1950s, and is now part of a local history museum.

The building was listed on the National Register of Historic Places in 2008.

== See also ==
- National Register of Historic Places listings in Sebastian County, Arkansas
