= Coosa County Jail =

- U.S. National Register of Historic Places
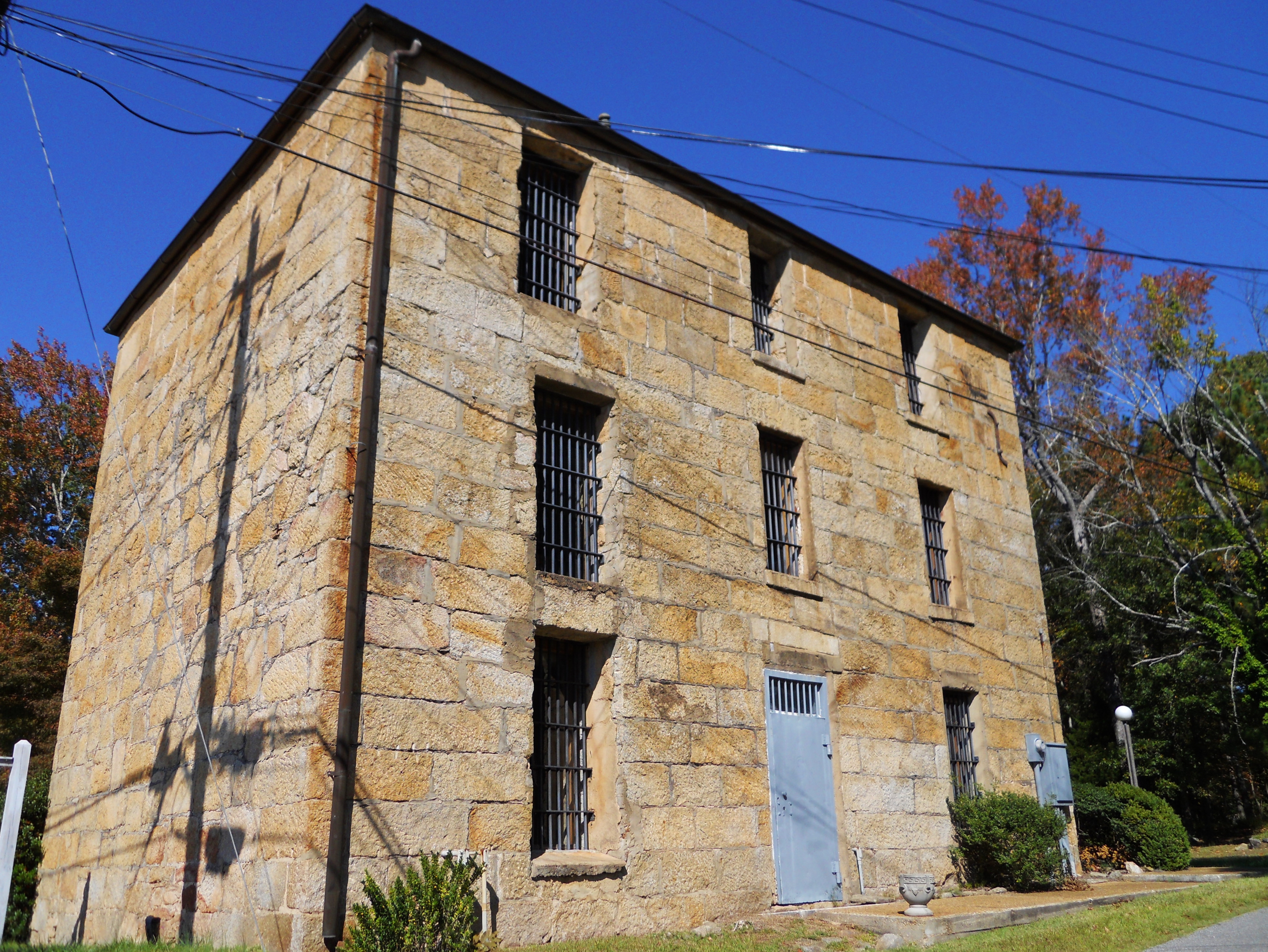
- The old Coosa County Jail in October 2011
- Interactive map of Coosa County Jail
- Location: Off AL 22, Rockford, Alabama
- Coordinates: 32°53′25″N 86°13′13″W
- Area: 0.5 acres (0.20 ha)
- Built: 1842
- Built by: Miller & Heard
- NRHP reference No.: 74000407
- Added to NRHP: June 20, 1974

The old Coosa County Jail is a former jail in Rockford, Alabama, United States. It is the oldest extant stone jail in Alabama. It was added to the National Register of Historic Places in 1974.

== History ==
Construction of the jail was authorized in 1839, four years after the county seat of Coosa County was moved to Rockford. It was completed in August 1842, at a cost of $2,745 ($91,579 in today's dollars). It was used a jail until 1938, then for storage until 1973. That year, the Coosa County Historical Society converted it to a museum.

== Architecture ==
The jail is a three-story building measuring 20 by 40 feet (6 by 12 meters). A chimney on one end pierces the hipped roof. It was built using locally sourced stone, about 2 by 3 feet (0.6 by 1 meter) in size. There are two doors, on the north and east sides. The door transoms and all windows are covered by iron bars. The interior walls are plastered.
