= Old Bedford County Jail =

- Bedford County Jail
- U.S. National Register of Historic Places
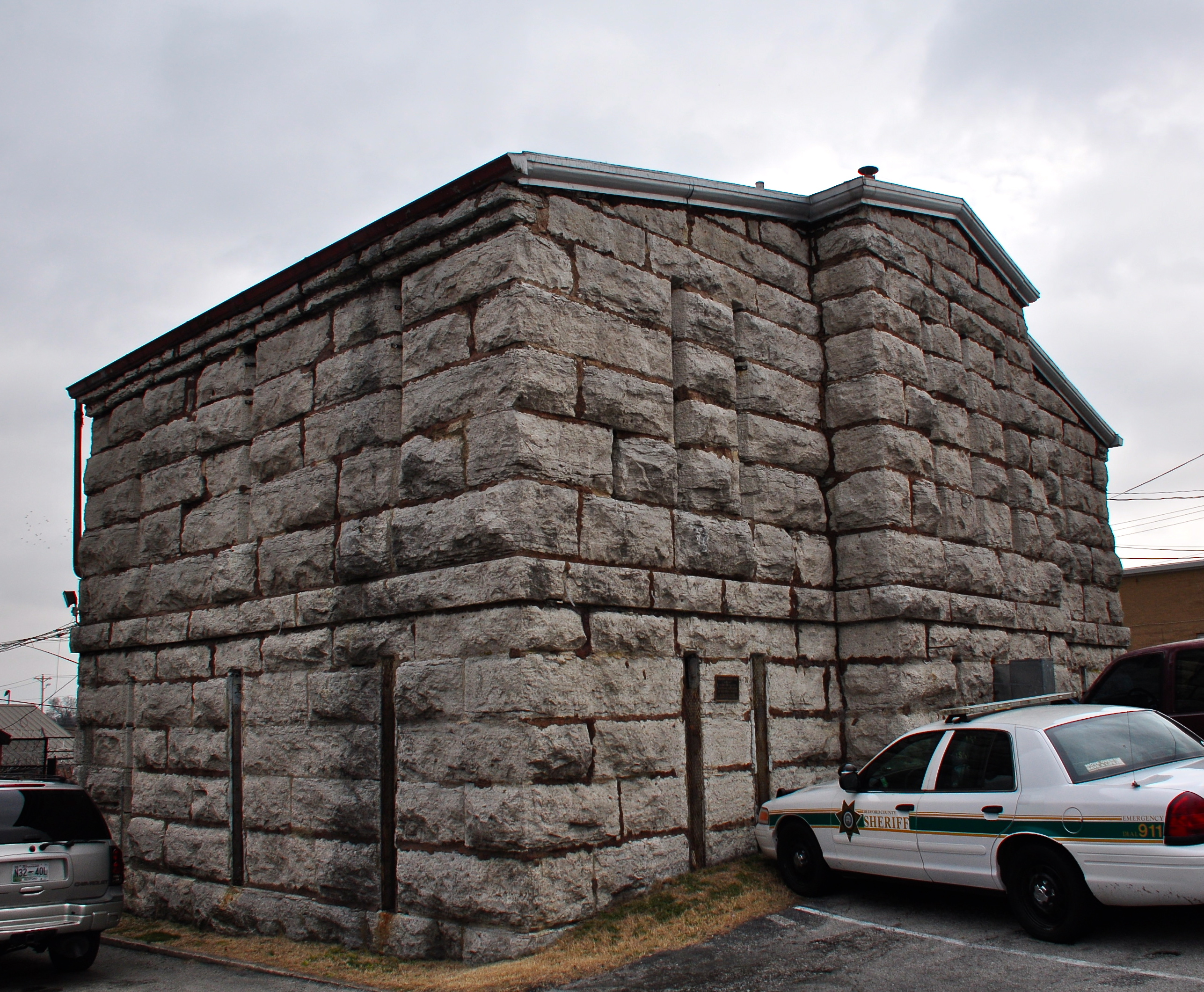

- Location within Tennessee Location within the United States
- Location: N. Spring and Jackson Sts., Shelbyville, Tennessee
- Coordinates: 35°29′4″N 86°27′38″W
- Area: 1 acre (0.40 ha)
- Built: 1866
- NRHP reference No.: 75001728
- Added to NRHP: April 1, 1975

The Old Bedford County Jail, sometimes known as the Rock House Jail, is a 19th-century jail building located near the public square in Shelbyville, Tennessee.

The old jail is a two-story building built in 1866-7 from solid hand-hewn limestone. Goodspeed's 1887 History of Tennessee described it as "one of the handsomest and most conspicuous buildings in Shelbyville". According to Goodspeed, it was "one of the most secure jails" in Tennessee, lighted and ventilated by "long, narrow windows, through which the smallest person could not escape".

The old jail was listed on the National Register of Historic Places in 1975.

Bedford County operates a modern county jail at 210 North Spring Street in Shelbyville.
