= Minnesota Territorial Prison =

- Territorial/State Prison
- Formerly listed on the U.S. National Register of Historic Places
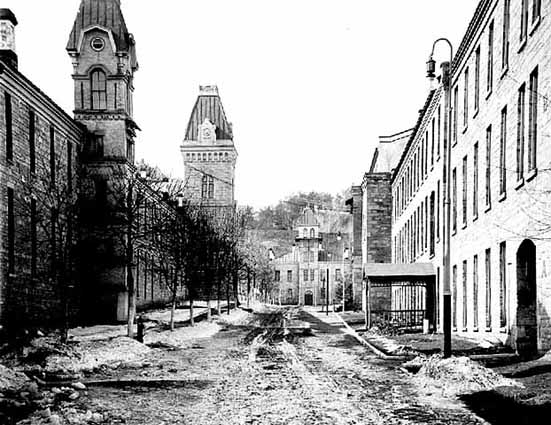
- The Minnesota State Prison in 1902

- Location within Minnesota Location within the United States
- Location: Main and Laurel Streets, Stillwater, Minnesota
- Coordinates: 45°3′45″N 92°48′29″W
- Built: 1884–98
- Built by: Jesse Taylor Company
- Architect: Jacob Fisher
- NRHP reference No.: 82003079

Significant dates
- Added to NRHP: April 20, 1982
- Removed from NRHP: January 7, 2005

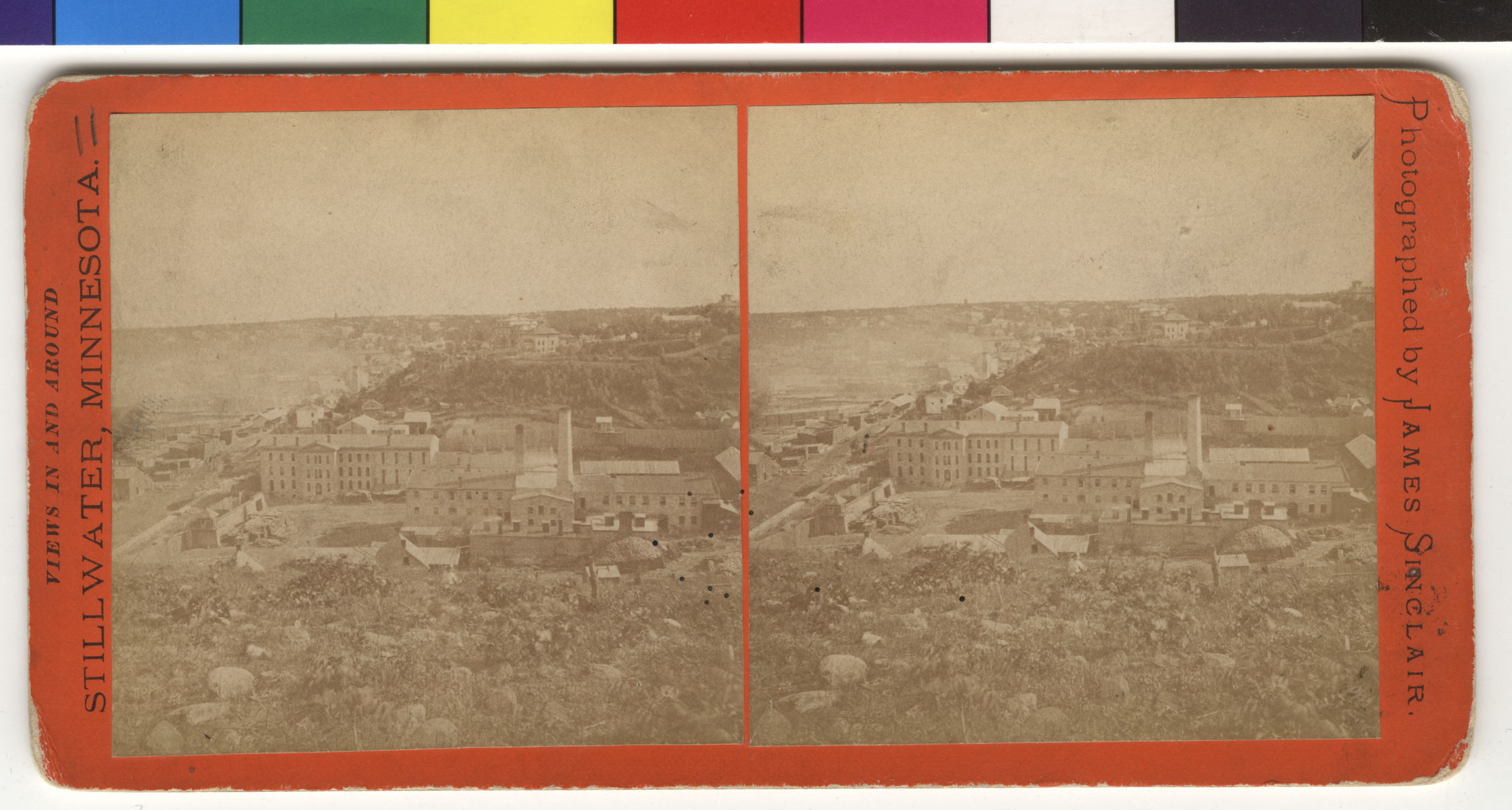
Minnesota State Prison around 1878, Stillwater, Minnesota

The Minnesota Territorial Prison, later the Minnesota State Prison, was a prison in Stillwater, Minnesota, United States, in operation from 1853 to 1914. Construction of the prison began in 1851, shortly after Minnesota became a territory. The prison was replaced by the Minnesota Correctional Facility – Stillwater in nearby Bayport. Most of the original prison's structures were demolished in 1936, leaving only the 1853 Warden's House and a manual labor complex that had been constructed 1884–1898. The surviving factory buildings were listed on the National Register of Historic Places in 1982 for having state-level significance in the themes of industry and social history. The historic site, long since unused, was destroyed by arson on September 3, 2002. It was formally delisted from the National Register in 2005.

== History ==
Plans for Minnesota's first prison were proposed by Governor Alexander Ramsey in 1849 and federal funds were secured the following year. The Minnesota Territorial Prison was constructed within a ravine on the northern edge of Stillwater. The site was chosen for its convenient proximity to the St. Croix River and its steamboat landings, and because the marshy land would be cheap. The architect was Jacob Fisher and the contractor was the Jesse Taylor Company. The initial phase of construction between 1851 and 1853 resulted in the main prison building, the outer walls, and the warden's house overlooking the complex from the bluff to the south.

The prison opened in 1853. The first warden was Francis R. Delano, who had been involved in its construction through the Jesse Taylor Company. The facility instituted a prison library under his leadership, and by 1858 had a physician and chaplain on staff. In 1859 the prison began leasing penal labor, providing private businesses with property on site and convict workers. Classic black-and-white-striped prison uniforms were adopted in 1860, and the reduction of sentences for good conduct time in 1862. An inmate-published newspaper, The Prison Mirror, launched in 1887. Relocated to the Minnesota Correctional Facility – Stillwater, The Prison Mirror is the oldest prison newspaper continuously printed in the United States.

In 1890, in an attempt to reduce political favoritism in the contract labor system, the prison began its own manufacturing program. Twine was the initial product. The following years saw Minnesota's first appointment of professional penologists as wardens. This led to reforms such as a convict grading system and a school for prison education. Warden Henry Wolfer also decried the conditions of the old prison, which by then was overcrowded, damp, poorly ventilated, and infested with cockroaches and bedbugs. He succeeded in getting the Minnesota Legislature to authorize funds for a new facility as the first decade of the 20th century drew to a close.

== Closure and later history ==
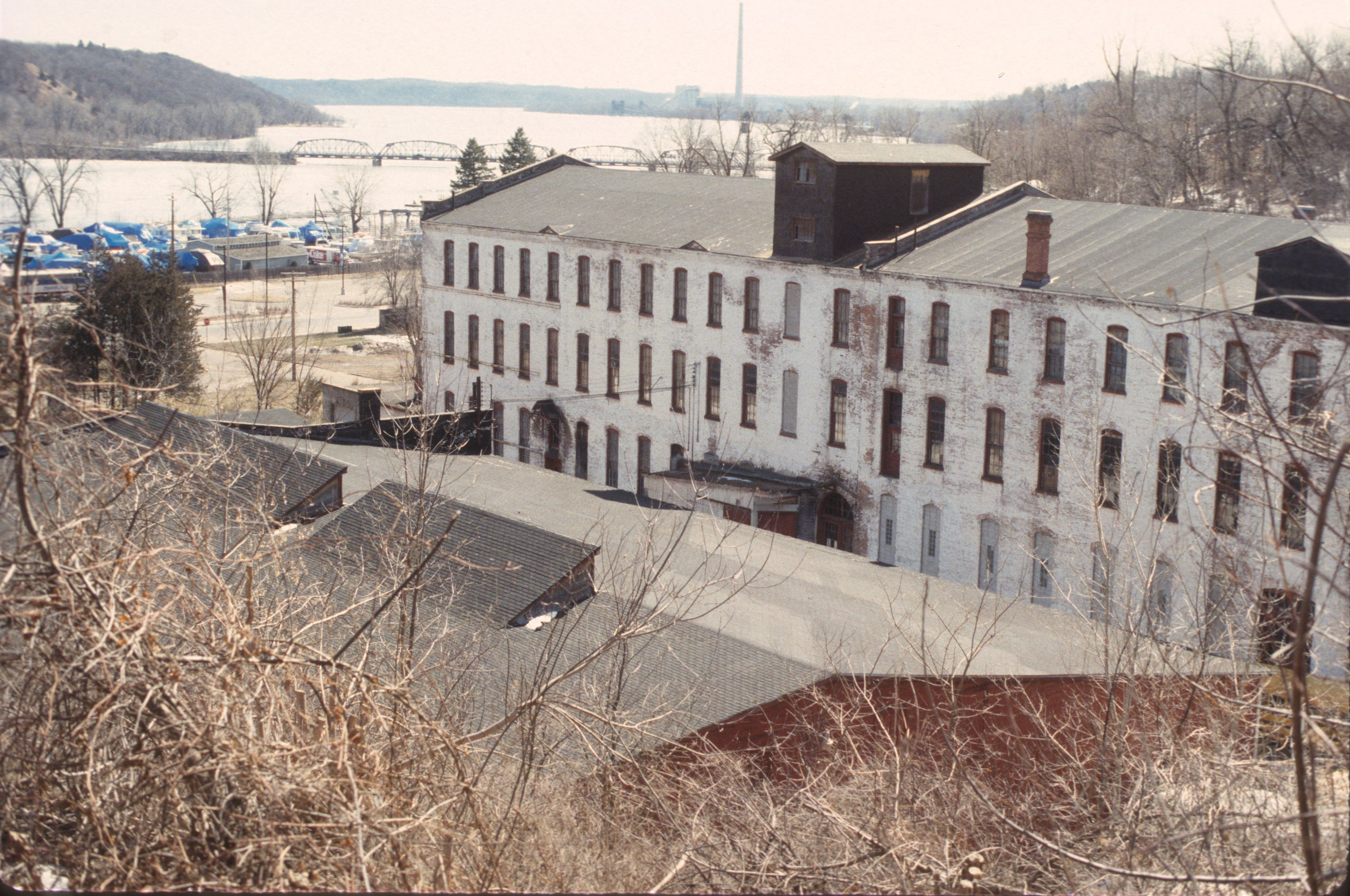
Prison complex in 1994.

The prison closed in 1914 upon relocation to the new facility in Bayport. The manual labor facilities and the warden's house remained in use, however. The rest of the complex was demolished in 1936. The Warden's House was transferred to the Washington County Historical Society in 1941 for use as a museum. Prisoners continued making twine at the old site into the 1970s, when the factory buildings were finally sold off. A dairy company operated out of them for decades, ultimately selling the property back to the city of Stillwater in 1996. There were hopes to convert the buildings into a hotel and conference center, but those plans fell through and the complex stood vacant. In 2002 a new set of developers was poised to renovate the site into apartments and condominiums.

However, on September 3, 2002, the three-story factory and a one-story warehouse were destroyed in a massive fire. Though the factory had a brick veneer, both buildings had internal wood frames. Fire departments from nearly a dozen cities responded, but flames were shooting over 100 feet (30 m) into the air and suppression efforts shifted to protecting nearby buildings such as the Warden's House. A few days later two men in their early 20s from Saint Paul came forward to say they and a friend had entered the vacant complex on the 3rd to explore and look for evidence of haunting. The friend, 18-year-old Peter Weyandt, wandered off by himself and then insisted they leave in a hurry. Weyandt reportedly claimed on the ride back that he'd started a fire, but his friends assumed he was joking until they got home and saw the news on TV. Weyandt was arrested and charged with second-degree arson. He stated that he'd set a piece of cardboard on fire out of boredom. Weyandt pleaded guilty and was sentenced to 180 days in jail. No charges were filed against his companions.

Despite the fire, redevelopment plans for the site proceeded. In 2003 the $2.1 million sale was finalized for construction of the Terra Springs condominium complex. The adjacent residence of the prison's wardens is now operated by the Washington County Historical Society as the Warden's House Museum. It contains exhibits on the former prison, period decor from the wardens' tenancy, and other aspects of Stillwater history.

== Notable inmates ==
The prison was well known because it once housed Cole, Bob, and Jim Younger, accomplices of Jesse James in the James–Younger Gang.

== See also ==
- List of jails and prisons on the National Register of Historic Places
- National Register of Historic Places listings in Washington County, Minnesota
