= Lodge Grass City Jail =

- U.S. National Register of Historic Places
- Location within Montana Location within the United States
- Location: Alley south of Third Ave., Lodge Grass, Montana
- Coordinates: 45°19′01″N 107°21′53″W
- Area: less than one acre
- Built: 1930
- Built by: City of Lodge Grass
- MPS: Lodge Grass MRA
- NRHP reference No.: 87001276
- Added to NRHP: August 3, 1987

The Lodge Grass City Jail, in Lodge Grass, Montana, was built in 1930. It was listed on the National Register of Historic Places in 1987.

It is a square poured concrete structure.

Also known as Old City Jail, it is located on an alley south of Third Avenue. The alley is parallel to, and in between, Main Street and Helen Street.
