= Old Gaol Building (Grahamstown) =

Coordinates: 33.3131°S 26.5229°E

The Old Gaol Building is a historic building built in 1824 in Makhanda, also known as Grahamstown, Eastern Cape, South Africa, and is the second-oldest building in Grahamstown. After the prison was closed in 1975, the building was renovated in 1984 and served as a backpackers' hostel.
