= Marquette County Courthouse and Marquette County Sheriff's Office and Jail =

- U.S. National Register of Historic Places
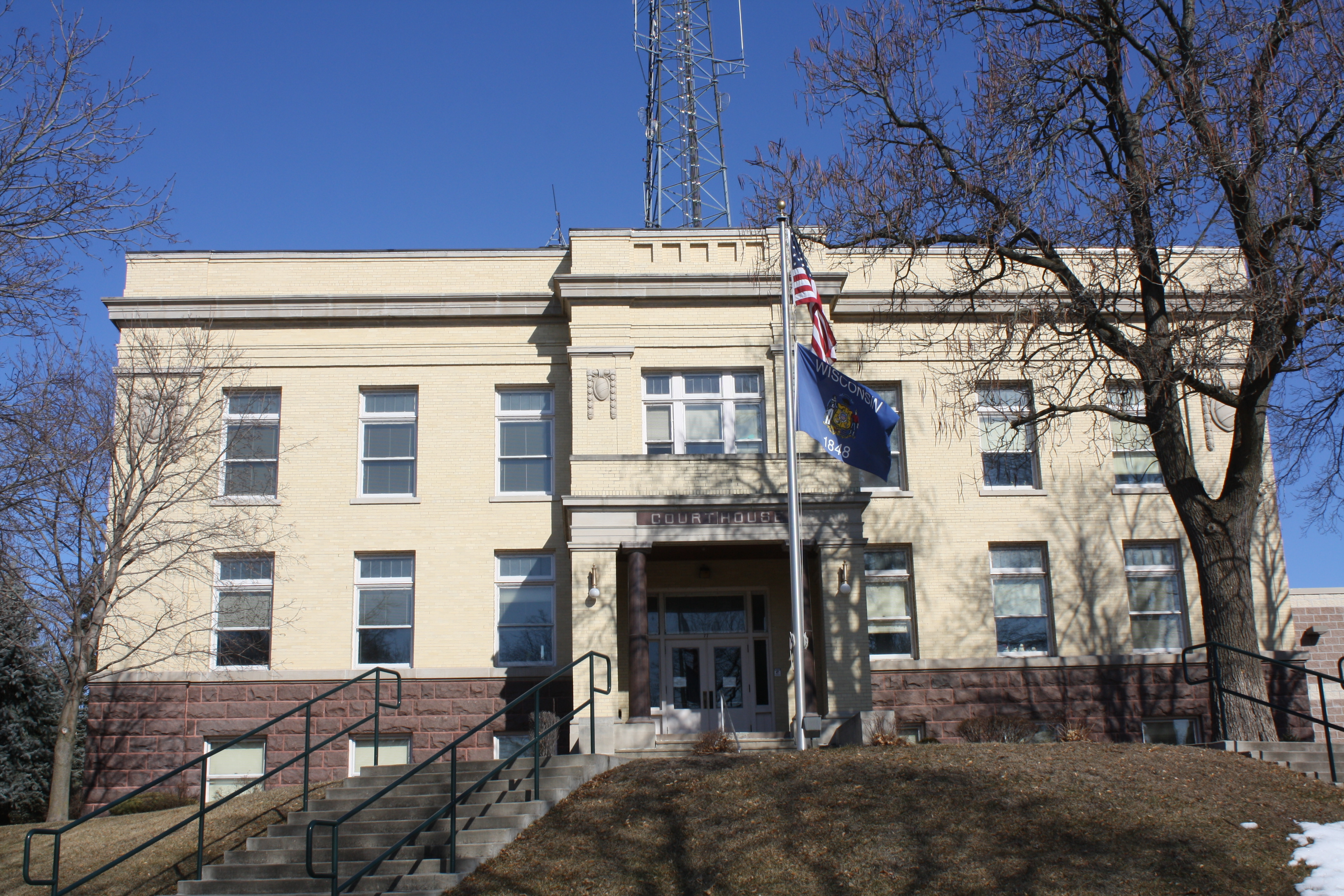
- Marquette County Courthouse
- Location: 77 W. Park St. Montello, Wisconsin
- Architectural style: Beaux-Arts
- NRHP reference No.: 82000685
- Added to NRHP: March 9, 1982

The Marquette County Courthouse and Marquette County Sheriff's Office and Jail is located in Montello, Wisconsin. In 1982, the site was added to the National Register of Historic Places.

== Description ==
The current courthouse was constructed in 1918 to replace the original that had been built in 1863. It was built out of stone and brick. The sheriff's office and jail is located behind the courthouse.
