= Moore County Courthouse and Jail (Tennessee) =

- U.S. National Register of Historic Places
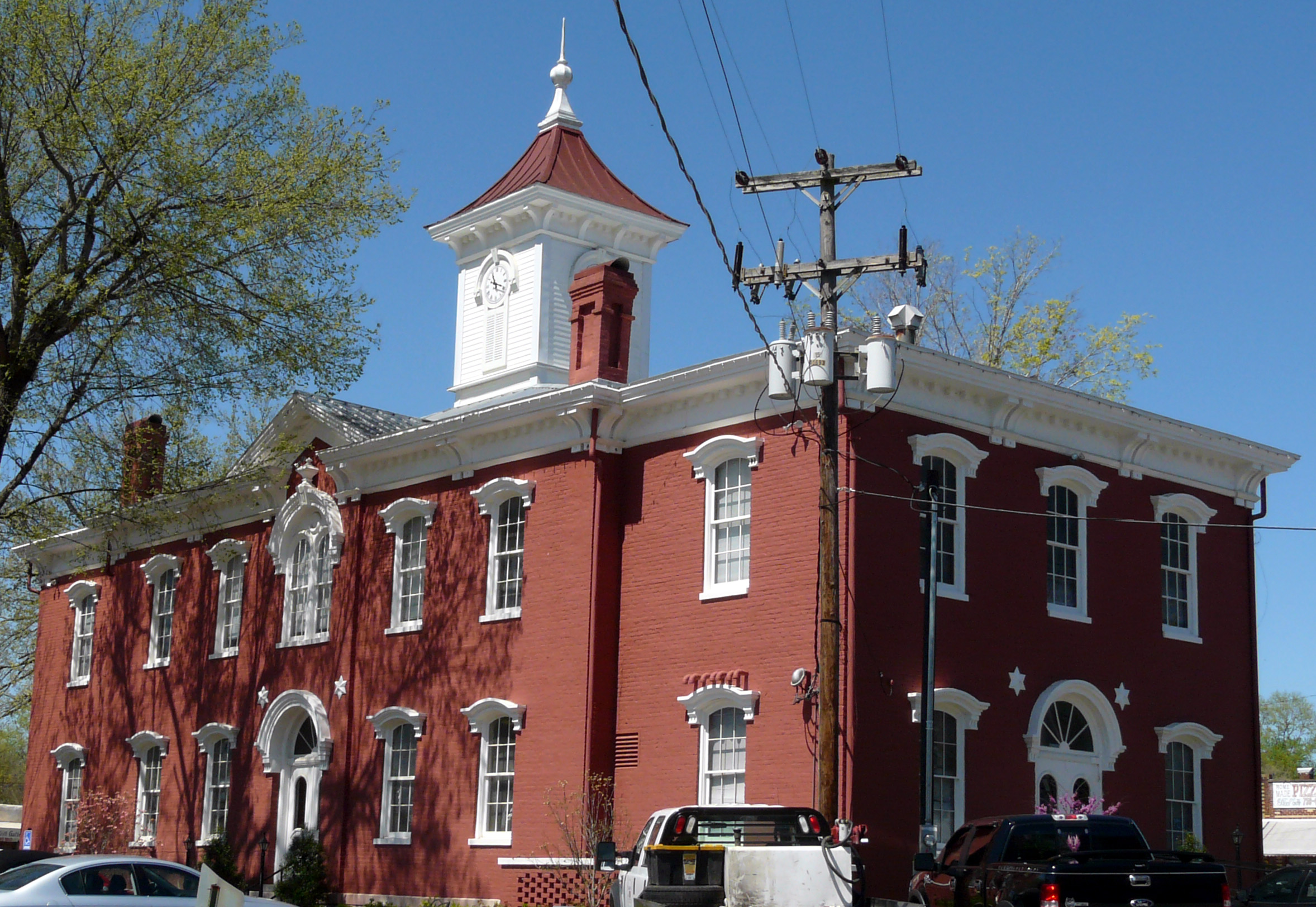
- The Moore County Courthouse in 2010

- Location within Tennessee
- Location: Court Square, Lynchburg, Tennessee
- Coordinates: 35°16′55″N 86°22′25″W
- Area: less than one acre
- Built: 1885
- Architectural style: Italianate
- NRHP reference No.: 79002452
- Added to NRHP: September 26, 1979

The Moore County Courthouse and Jail is a historic building complex in Lynchburg, Tennessee. It includes both the jail and the courthouse for Moore County, Tennessee. Designed in the Italianate architectural style, it is listed on the National Register of Historic Places.

== History ==
The county jail was built on land owned by Colonel John M. Hughes, a veteran of the Confederate States Army during the American Civil War of 1861–1865. Its construction was completed in 1876, only five years after the establishment of Moore County. The construction team was Bobo and Stegall.

Between 1872 and 1880, the Grand Central Hotel owned by Dr. E Y. Salmon, another Confederate veteran who served as the county clerk/master, was the de facto county courthouse. Other meeting places included a church and a school in Lynchburg. Construction on the county courthouse across the square from the jail began in 1884, and it was completed within a year. The builder was S.L.P. Garrett.

== Architectural significance ==
The jail was designed with a gablet roof, and the courthouse was designed in the Italianate architectural style. They have been listed on the National Register of Historic Places since September 26, 1979.
