= Old Jail (Gordo, Alabama) =

- U.S. National Register of Historic Places
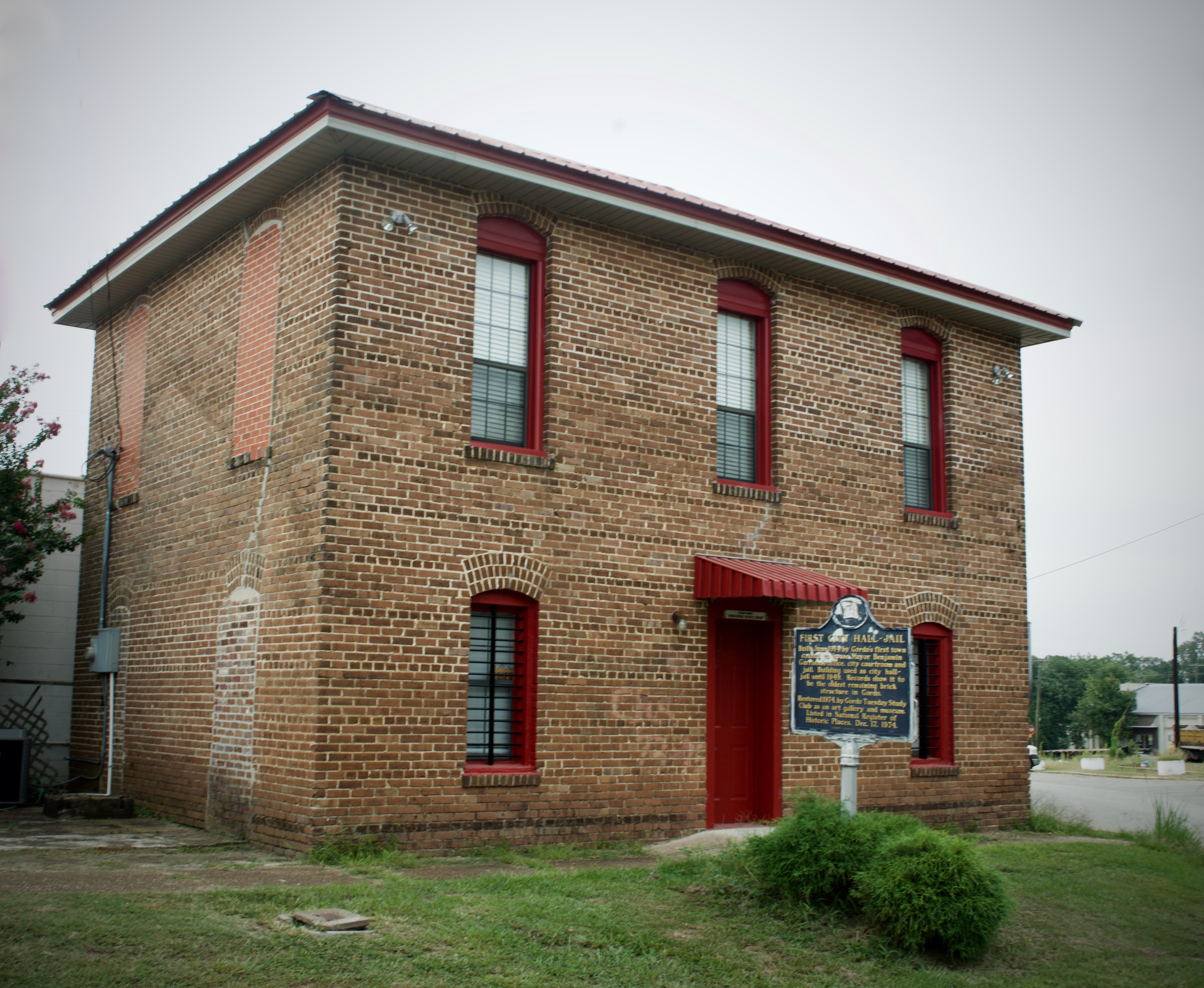

- Location within Alabama Location within the United States
- Location: NE corner of Church St. and 1st Ave., Gordo, Alabama
- Coordinates: 33°19′14″N 87°54′14″W
- Area: less than one acre
- Built: 1914
- NRHP reference No.: 74000434
- Added to NRHP: December 17, 1974

The Old Jail, also known as the Gordo Jail and Mayor's Office, is a historic former jail and office building in Gordo, Alabama. The two-story brick structure was completed in 1914. It originally contained two jail cells and a mayor's office downstairs, with a courtroom upstairs. It served as jail and town hall until circa 1930, when everything but the jail moved to other premises. It continued to serve as a jail until 1955. It has served various functions since that time. It was added to the National Register of Historic Places on December 17, 1974.

The Gordo Tuesday Study Club undertook the project. Member of the club, Ella Mae Simpson, along with her fellow members, Ena Alexander, Sally Kabric and Jonny Pelliitier worked to restore the building. The group removed debris and dead birds from the structure and later converted it into an art gallery and museum. Their restoration efforts contributed to the preservation of the building.
