= Old Scott County Jail =

- Scott City County Jail, (Old)
- U.S. National Register of Historic Places
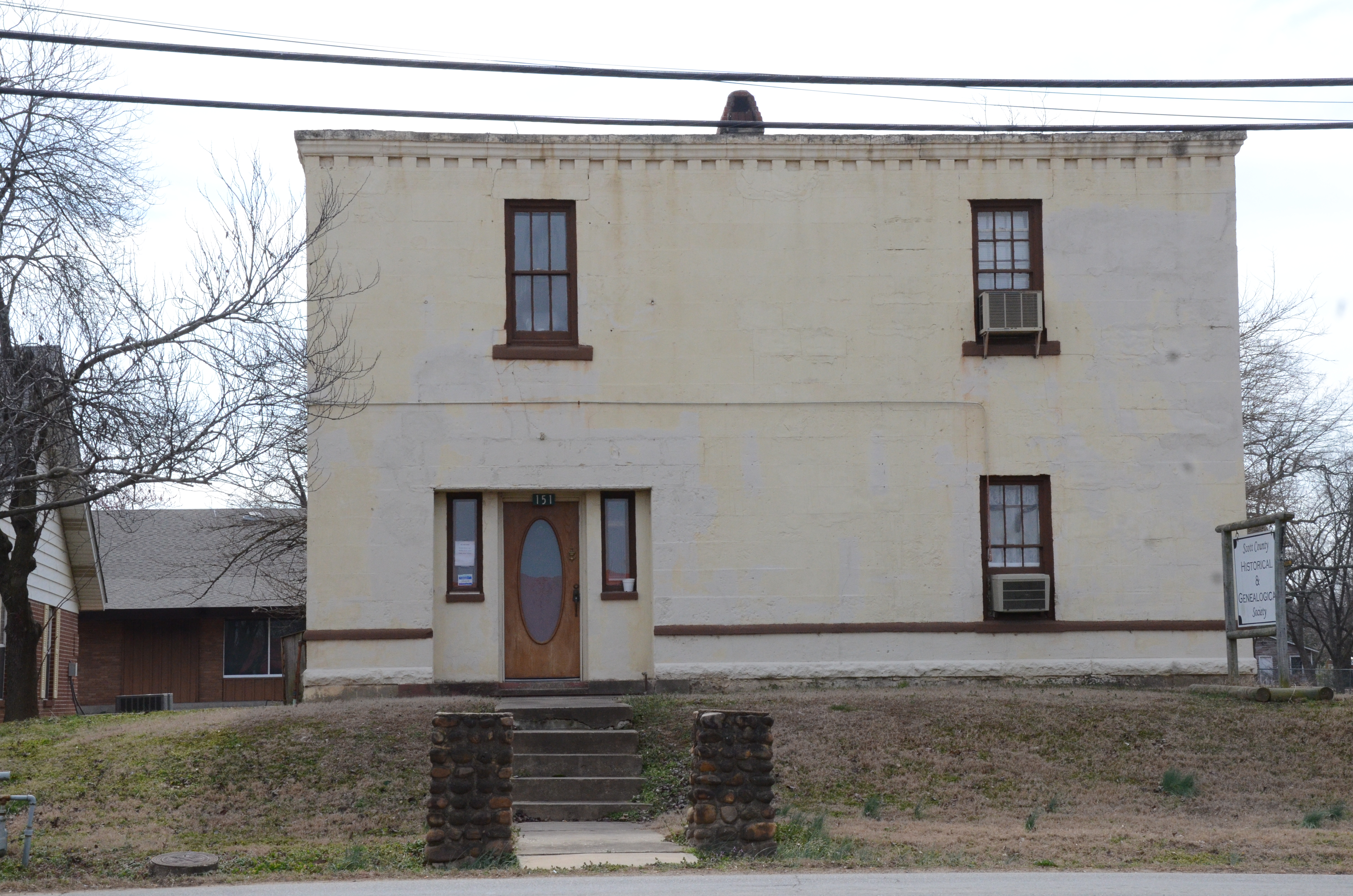

- Location within Arkansas Location within the United States
- Location: 125 W. 2nd St., Waldron, Arkansas
- Coordinates: 34°53′56″N 94°5′29″W
- Area: less than one acre
- Built: 1908
- Built by: J.L. McCartney
- Architectural style: vernacular stone jail
- NRHP reference No.: 02000486
- Added to NRHP: May 16, 2002

The Old Scott County Jail is a historic former county jail at 125 West 2nd Street in Waldron, Arkansas. It is currently home to the Scott County Historical and Genealogical Society. The building is a two-story structure, built of fieldstone covered in concrete, with a flat roof and a stone foundation. It has a single entrance, which has sidelight windows, and its windows now have decorative shutters rather than iron bars. The jail was built in 1907–08, and was used for its original purpose until the 1930s, when it was adapted (with funding from the Works Progress Administration) for use as Waldron's public library. The library occupied the building between 1938 and 1947, and it was used for a time by local Boy Scout and Girl Scout organizations. It has housed the historical society since 1987.

The building was listed on the National Register of Historic Places in 2002.

== See also ==
- National Register of Historic Places listings in Scott County, Arkansas
