= Minnesota Correctional Facility – Stillwater =

Prison in Bayport, Minnesota, United States

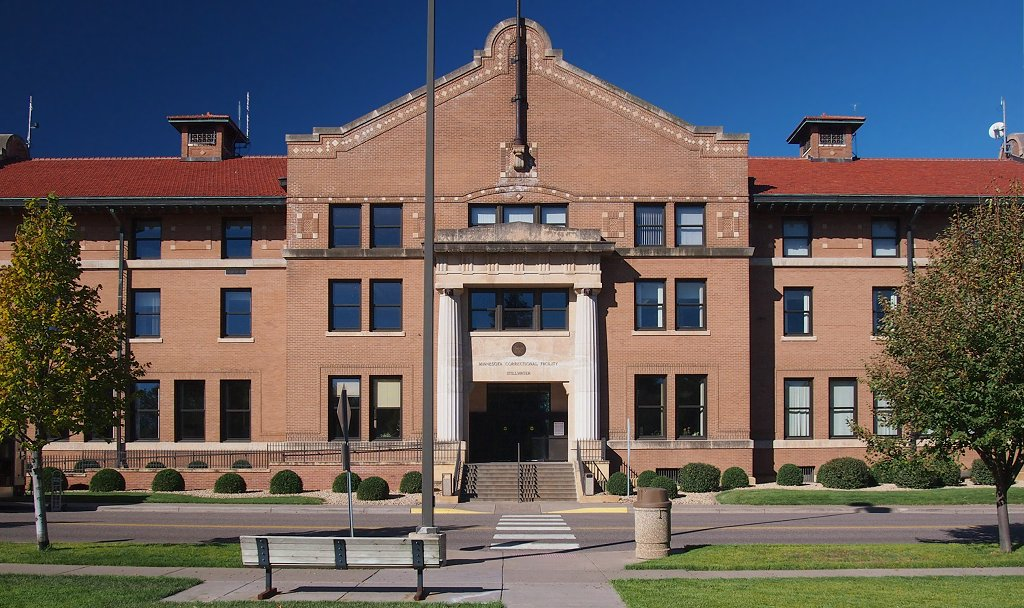
- Main entrance of the Minnesota Correctional Facility – Stillwater
- Interactive map of Minnesota Correctional Facility – Stillwater
- Location: Bayport, Minnesota, United States; 45°1′40″N 92°47′20″W
- Status: Operational
- Security class: Level 4- "Close Custody"
- Population: 1537 (February 12, 2019)
- Opened: 1914
- Managed by: Minnesota Department of Corrections
- Warden: William Bolin
- Website: https://mn.gov/doc/facilities/stillwater/
- State Prison Historic District
- U.S. National Register of Historic Places
- U.S. Historic district
- Area: 35 acres (14 ha)
- Built: 1910–14, 1928
- Architect: Clarence H. Johnston Sr.
- Architectural style: Gothic Revival
- NRHP reference No.: 86001574
- Added to NRHP: July 10, 1986

The Minnesota Correction Facility – Stillwater (MCF-STW) is a close custody (level 4) state prison for men in Bayport, Minnesota, United States. Built 1910–1914, it houses 1,600 inmates in seven different living areas. Additionally, approximately 100 inmates are housed in a nearby minimum security area. It replaced the original Minnesota Territorial Prison located just to the north in the city of Stillwater, Minnesota. Until recent expansion of the medium custody (level 3) Minnesota Correctional Facility – Faribault, MCF-STW was the state's largest facility by inmate population. A historic district consisting of 22 contributing properties was listed on the National Register of Historic Places in 1986 as the State Prison Historic District for having state-level significance in architecture. It was nominated for being one of the nation's earliest and most influential appearances of the "telephone pole" layout, with a large main hallway connecting each of the units, that was widely adopted by high-security prisons. MCF-STW is noted for its award-winning publication The Prison Mirror, the oldest continuously-operated prison newspaper in the United States.

== History ==
The idea for the creation of the original Minnesota State Prison at Stillwater came in February 1851 as part of legislation dealing with territories. However, the prison did not start receiving inmates until two years later in March 1853, which was still five years before Minnesota was inducted into statehood. At the beginning of the 20th century the prison started to become severely overcrowded, leading to the passing of legislation providing allowances to build a new prison two miles (3 km) south of the original location. The new prison, created in 1912, was placed on 160 acres (65 ha) of land and included two factory buildings, two warehouses, a hospital, a chapel, a greenhouse, a dining hall, and five cell buildings to accommodate the large number of prisoners. The prison was run by the warden and the Board of Inspectors, which had three members who created the prison rules and were in charge of determining and implementing punishments within the prison. In 1901 the Board of Inspectors was replaced by the State Board of Control, which had monthly meetings at the prison and mostly involved reviewing and discussing parole requests. This lasted until 1959. During 1959 the State Board of Control relinquished its authority to the Minnesota Department of Corrections, which had recently been established.

In 2008 four inmates attempted to tunnel their way out. David Spaeth, Craig Friend, Andrew Salinas and Gonzalo Hernandez used pilfered tools, including an electric hammer drill, to tunnel approximately 25 feet. Their plan was thwarted when a corrections officer followed a power cord. Prison officials described the escape attempt as "sophisticated and complex".

On July 18, 2018, Edward Muhammad Johnson, an inmate serving a 29-year sentence for second degree murder, struck correctional officer Joseph Gomm multiple times in the head with a hammer, killing him. Gomm, 45, had been a corrections officer at the facility for 16 years. It was the state's first known incident of a prison guard killed in the line of duty by an inmate. Johnson was charged and convicted of first-degree murder and sentenced to life imprisonment. He was initially moved to Minnesota Correctional Facility – Oak Park Heights but was subsequently transferred into the custody of the Federal Bureau of Prisons. As of 2024, Johnson is serving his sentence at ADX Florence.

On September 3, 2023, approximately 100 inmates at the prison “took over” a living unit at approximately 8 am. The takeover was described as a peaceful protest that went on for several hours in which inmates were expressing their disapproval for the series of lockdowns that occurred due to "understaffing" along with “unsafe living conditions” at the prison. Between 2-3 pm, the situation was peacefully resolved and 2 inmates were detained for disciplinary action.

== Programs ==
One of three Level 4 (Close) custody facilities in Minnesota, the prison hosts an industrial program, education programs, and the Atlantis chemical dependency treatment program. A small number of inmates are selected for the facility's fine arts painting program.

The offenders housed in the minimum security area are responsible for the maintenance of the grounds surrounding the prison, and for cleaning office areas within the non-secured areas inside the main prison facility.

MCF-STW has undergone a number of modernization efforts, including the demolition of an antiquated medical building and construction of a modern segregation unit capable of housing up to 150 inmates in 2008.

=== The Prison Mirror ===
Notable one-time Stillwater prisoners include Frank Elli author of The Riot; Edgar-winning crime novelist E. Richard Johnson, author of Silver Street and Mongo's Back in Town; and Harley M. Sorensen, former columnist for SFGate.com. Elli wrote The Riot and other books in Stillwater prison and was a member of the Ink Weavers writing group there. Sorensen was editor of The Prison Mirror, the inmate publication still produced by the men at Stillwater. Sorensen's posthumous first book, Prison is a Place, documents life in Stillwater Prison in the early 1970s through the author's exchange of letters with a St. Paul religious studies class.

The Prison Mirror celebrated its 125th anniversary in August 2012. It was founded in 1887 with the warden's permission using funds from prisoners including the Younger Brothers, members of the James–Younger Gang and is believed to be the oldest continuously published prison newspaper in the United States. It has been named the best prison newspaper in the United States several times, winning the Charles C. Clayton award in 1969 and 1987 from the University of Illinois – Carbondale, and a similar award from Amicus in 1985. Topically the newspaper has a tight focus on life in the prison, covering sports such as broom hockey, basketball and dodgeball, educational pursuits and achievements of the prisoners, notable visitors and available support programs, and other matters. A regular column called "Ask the Warden" presents questions and requests to the warden. Comings and goings of staff members are often noted. Most issues feature poetry and artwork produced by the prisoners. In-depth features included an interview with several 'lifers' including Harvey Carignan, an examination of Minnesota's prison commissary prices and the supplier MINNCOR, and a cover story about the aging population of America's prisons.

== Appearances in media ==
The prison is mentioned in the 1939 James Cagney film Each Dawn I Die. It is also mentioned in the 1996 Coen Brothers black comedy thriller movie Fargo.

The 1956 book Nineteen Years Not Guilty: The Leonard Hankins' Story in His Own Words, as Told to Earl Guy describes an innocent man's experiences inside Stillwater Prison.

Stillwater is mentioned frequently in the "Prey" series of novels authored by John Sandford.

== See also ==
- List of jails and prisons on the National Register of Historic Places
- List of Minnesota state prisons
- National Register of Historic Places listings in Washington County, Minnesota
