= Old Jail (Washington, Georgia) =

- U.S. National Register of Historic Places
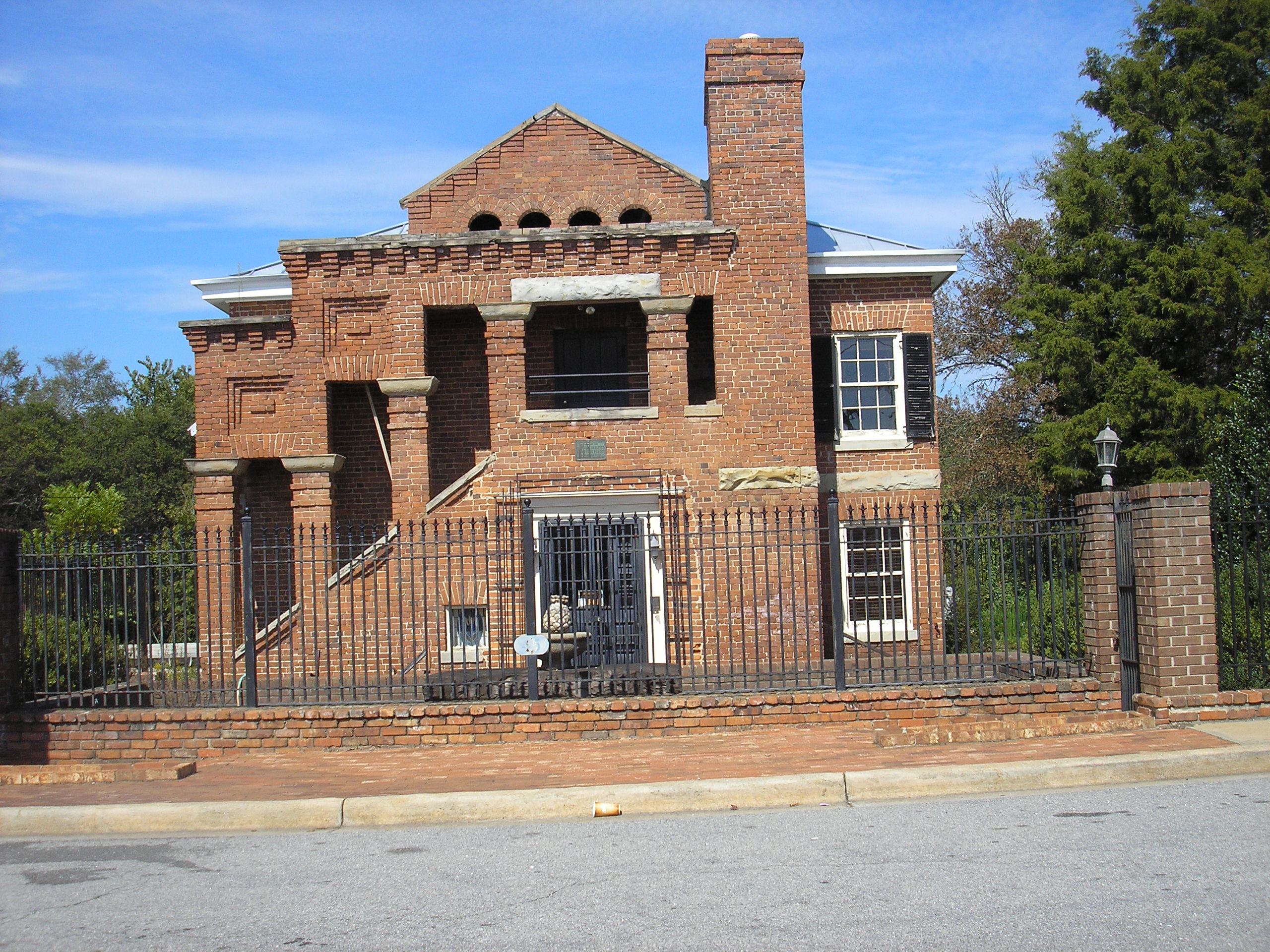

- Location within Georgia
- Location: 103 Court St., Washington, Georgia
- Coordinates: 33°44′20″N 82°44′28″W
- Area: less than one acre
- Built: 1891
- Built by: McDonald Brothers
- Architectural style: Romanesque
- NRHP reference No.: 74000706
- Added to NRHP: June 5, 1974

The Old Jail, also known as the Old Wilkes County Jail, located at 15 Court Street in Washington, Georgia was built in 1891. It was built by the McDonald Brothers Company of Louisville. The Old Jail has been on the list of National Register of Historic Places since June 5, 1974. It is a contributing member to the Washington Commercial Historic District, which was included on the National Register of Historic places on March 6, 1986.

== History ==
The Old Jail was built in 1891 and was designed by the McDonald Brothers Jail Building Company of Louisville. Kentucky. It replaced an existing jail in Washington was considered unsafe and unsanitary. The 1891 jail was designed to meet the need for a better jail as evidenced by Grand Jury minutes from time to time starting in the 1870s. The Old Jail was built on a site owned by Wilkes County. Two earlier jails were located on the same site but in somewhat different locations. Construction of the first jail started in 1796 and was completed in 1798. It was a brick building with quarters downstairs for the jailer’s family. The prisoners were kept upstairs. A second jail was built on the site in 1817 or 1818, and it remained until the 1891 jail was built.

On January 22, 1891, an $8,250 contract was awarded to the McDonald Brothers Jail Building Company to construct a new jail for the growing community. The McDonald Brothers Company was well known for its jail and public building designs throughout the South and Midwest. That Company designed and built many buildings during the last 20 years of the nineteenth century. Many of their works survive and are listed on the National Register.

Three of the McDonald Brothers—Harry, Kenneth and Donald—formed the McDonald Brothers Company in 1883. The Company continued until at least 1891. The Louisville city directory listed them all as architects. Harry was president of the McDonald Brothers Building Company as well as president of the Louisville Bottle and Extract Manufacturing Company. Kenneth was the secretary of the jail company, and Donald was its general manager. Both Harry and Donald attended the engineering school of Washington College, and Donald graduated from Washington and Lee University in 1873. Many of their works survive and are listed on the National Register of Historic Places.

The May, 1892 Superior Court Minutes of the Grand Jury expressed great satisfaction with the new jail. The Grand Jury praised the jail’s cleanliness and comfort compared with the former jail. They recommended building a fence and installing blinds for the windows.

The Old Jail used an innovative heating system design which closely approached that of an experiment. It was arguably an early version of the duct or forced-air method of heating. A fire was built outside, with the hot air drawn in through a system of moat-like tunnels formed by large limestone blocks; the warm air was then vented through a large chimney. The theory was that the warm air would be conducted through the ducts and transmitted to the cells through the porous limestone walls and floor.

Unfortunately, the heating system failed to function as expected and the engineering gaffe was one reason the jail was used for only about 20 years. In presentments published in the June 4, 1895 Wilkes County Chronicle, the County announced it would accept bids on a contract for a new heating system for the jail. The heating system was refurbished with interior fireplaces on the first and second floors and other changes were made, but it is unclear if the changes were effective.

The Old Jail continued to limp along because it had other fatal problems: The November 1908 Grand Jury described the jail as a “constant menace.” There were complaints of inadequate space and unsanitary conditions. The History of Wilkes County, Georgia says: “In the twenty years since its first occupancy, escapes had come with alarming frequency and the community would breathe a sigh of relief when the new, more secure, structure opened.” (p. 333) In fact, in March 1911, just as a new jail was being completed, two prisoners escaped from The Old Jail, one who had been incarcerated for murdering his wife and the other who had been jailed for burglary.

A new jail was built behind the courthouse in 1911 and The Old Jail became vacant and deteriorated. The building changed hands several times during the 1930s and 1940s. The ground floor was for a time operated as the Royal Café, while the upper floor was used as an apartment.

The Old Jail was acquired by new owners in 2019. Current plans are to rehabilitate the building as apartments and live-work space.

== Architecture ==
The two-story building encompasses approximately 1350 square feet and sits on .22 acres.

It was designed in the Romanesque Revival style popular during the late nineteenth century. The style is evidenced in the solidarity and strength exhibited in the square brick pillars, the shadow-box plaque and dentil designs, and the rough stone banding.

The exterior design reflects the strength of the building. Constructed of red brick in common bond, it fairly square and has a square, hipped metal roof and a belt coursing of rough stone. The front façade follows the covered stairway, under which is a doorway. The original door was a post and lintel, stone-faced doorway.

Brick designs include flat gauged apertures between each column, indented square brick patterns, and a brick, dentilled cornice along the stepped and gabled rooflines. A series of small round head arches form a pattern across the gabled portion of the roof. The current six-over-six windows have flat gauged brick work above each window. The windows have been altered to make the openings smaller. What the original windows looked like is unknown. The second-story entrance has the original jail door. The jail had a solitary confinement area just inside the front door and the original iron bars remain.

The Old Jail was abandoned and sat vacant from about 1911 until the early 1930s. Thereafter, the building was altered to suit various functions including apartments, a café, and a special event venue. Wood flooring replaced the limestone on the second floor and in parts of the first floor. Many of the limestone blocks were removed and some are used as patios on the east and north sides of the building. Others are located on a separate lot to the north of The Old Jail. Many of the limestone blocks contain easily seen Paleozoic marine fossils, including stromatoporoids (a kind of extinct sea sponge).

The building was renovated in the 1970s, including a two-story addition on the north side and a one-story brick addition at the northwest corner. The new structures were used as apartments and special event space until the late 1990s. At some point, probably in the 1990s, a fire significantly damaged both additions. The fire did not impact the original jail structure.

== See also ==
- National Register of Historic Places listings in Wilkes County, Georgia
