= Minnesota Department of Corrections =

State law enforcement agency in MN, USA

- Abbreviation: MNDOC
- Motto: Transforming Lives For A Safer Minnesota

Agency overview
- Formed: 1853
- Employees: 4,200 (estimate)

Jurisdictional structure
- Operations jurisdiction: United States
- Legal jurisdiction: Minnesota

Operational structure
- Headquarters: St. Paul, Minnesota
- Commissioner responsible: Paul Schnell

Website
- https://mn.gov/doc/ (official site)

The Minnesota Department of Corrections is a state law enforcement agency of Minnesota that operates prisons. Its headquarters is in St. Paul.

As of 2010, the state of Minnesota does not contract with private prisons. The first and only private prison in the state, the Prairie Correctional Facility, was closed by its owner in 2010.

== Organization ==
The department was established in 1959, combining the Corrections Division of the Department of Public Welfare with the Youth Conservation Commission and the Board of Parole.

The head of the department is referred to as the commissioner, a position appointed by the governor. As of 7 January 2019, the holder of this office is Paul Schnell. The Commissioner may appoint up to two Deputy Commissioners.

=== Command structure ===
List of ranks within facilities:

Title	Insignia
Captain	
Lieutenant	
Sergeant - NON-SWORN POSITION	
Corrections Officer 2 - NON-SWORN POSITION	
Corrections Officer 1 NON- SWORN POSITION	

The Minnesota Department of Corrections does not require its staff to be licensed peace officers and most are not licensed peace officers excluding the Minnesota Department of Corrections' Fugitive Apprehension Unit (FAU) and some investigation positions with the Office of Special Investigation (OSI) and Office of Professional Accountability (OPA).

== Adult and juvenile correctional facilities ==
Minnesota state correctional facilities
Facility	Pop. type	Security class	2024 Population
Faribault	Male	1-3	1,958
Lino Lakes	Male	1-3	1,019
Moose Lake	Male	1-3	1,067
Oak Park Heights	Male	5	305
St. Cloud	Male	Intake (1-5)	1,028
Stillwater	Male	1 & 4	1,232
Red Wing Adults	Male	2	41
Rush City	Male	4	966
Willow River (CIP)	Male	1	109
Shakopee	Female	1-5	565
Togo (CIP)	Male	1	76
Red Wing	Juvenile male		

== Licensed by Minnesota Department of Corrections ==
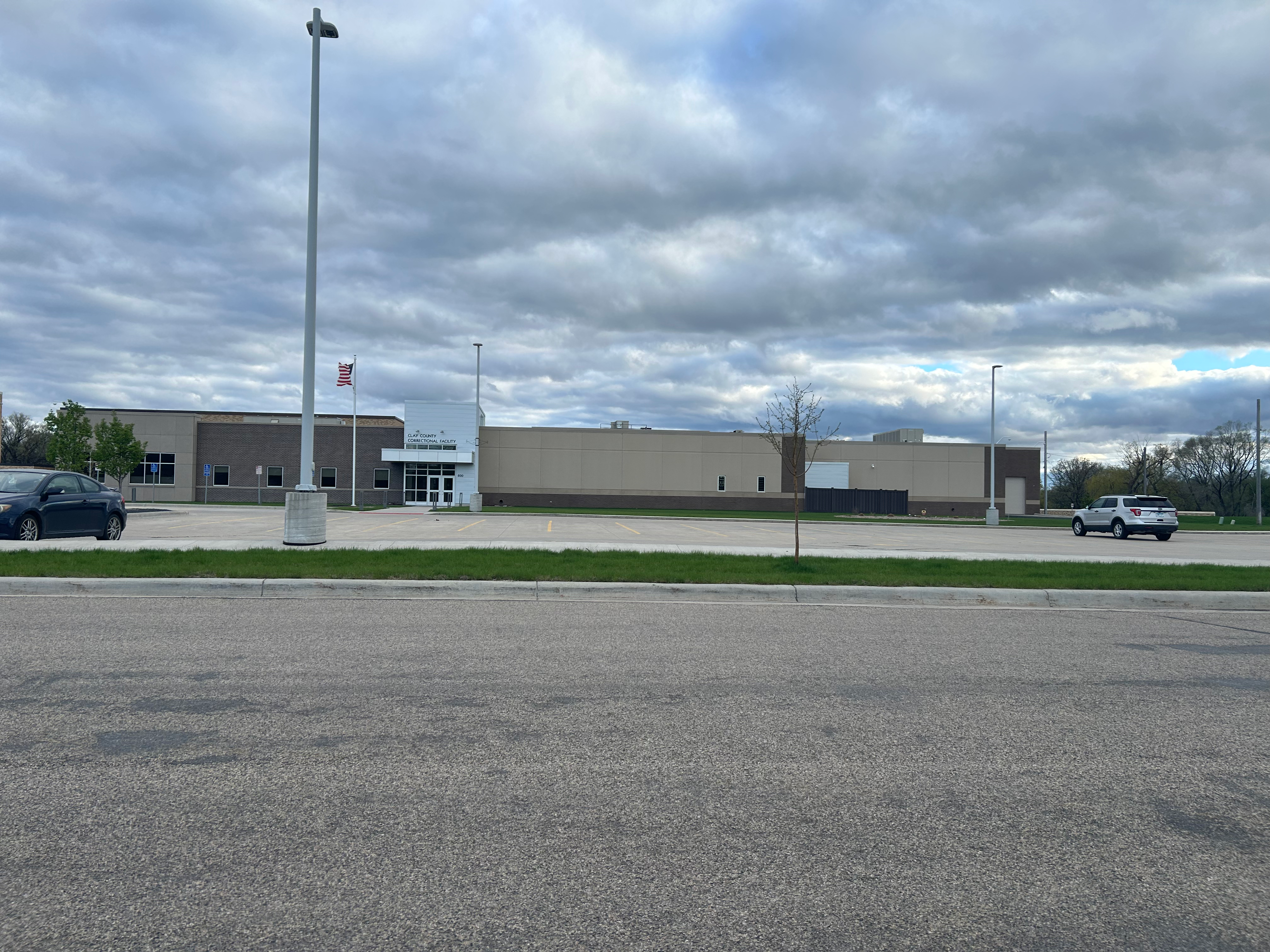
Clay County Correctional Facility; Moorhead, Minnesota.

Licensed by Minnesota Department of Corrections
Facility	Pop. type	No. of beds
Clay County Correctional Facility	Male and Female	220

== Juvenile services ==
The department operates juvenile correctional facilities.

Minnesota Correctional Facility – Red Wing in Red Wing serves delinquent boys. It was built in 1889. Minnesota Correctional Facility – Togo in northern Itasca County no longer serves delinquent boys and girls. The Togo facility opened in 1955 as Youth Conservation Commission (YCC). For years it was known as Thistledew Camp. In 2006 the facility's name changed to MCF-Togo, and the Thistledew designation is used to refer to the juvenile programs. Now MCF-TOGO only serves adult males as a CIP program

== Programs ==
=== MINNCOR ===
Prison industries in Minnesota date back to the production of twine at Stillwater Prison in the 1870s. MINNCOR was created in 1994 to consolidate work from multiple sites and to centralize management functions. Statutes require MINNCOR to be financially self-sufficient, a status it has maintained since 2003. MINNCOR produces goods in its own facilities for sale to public-sector customers and also contracts to provide labor to private-sector businesses. While remaining part of the department and subject to its policies, MINNCOR is structured like a private business and headed by a chief executive officer (CEO). Within MINNCOR, since 2007 the EMPLOY program has supported recruitment of incarcerated individuals into post-release employment.

=== Minnesota Prison Writing Workshop ===
Founded in 2011, the Minnesota Prison Writing Workshop is the largest literary and arts program housed within a United States Department of Corrections. The first classes were offered at the Minnesota State Prison at Lino Lakes and by 2020 the Workshop had expanded to include all of Minnesota's adult facilities.

=== Minnesota Restitution Center ===
Opened in September, 1972 and championed by Commissioner David Fogel, the Minnesota Restitution Center (MRC) was an initiative that introduced many of the practices now associated with the restorative justice movement. For the first two years of existence, it operated as a residential program for men who had been convicted of property crimes. Program staff facilitated meetings at state prison facilities between victims and offenders, who then paid restitution to the victims after being paroled to the residential facility at the Minneapolis YMCA Central Building. Program staff and participants also engaged in extensive outreach to community groups, the media, and international symposia to raise awareness about restitution. The program retained its original form for only a couple of years and, by the early 1980s, was transformed into a community service program.

== See also ==
- List of law enforcement agencies in Minnesota
- List of United States state correction agencies
- List of U.S. state prisons
