= Old St. Johns County Jail =

Historic jail in St. Augustine, Florida

- U.S. National Register of Historic Places
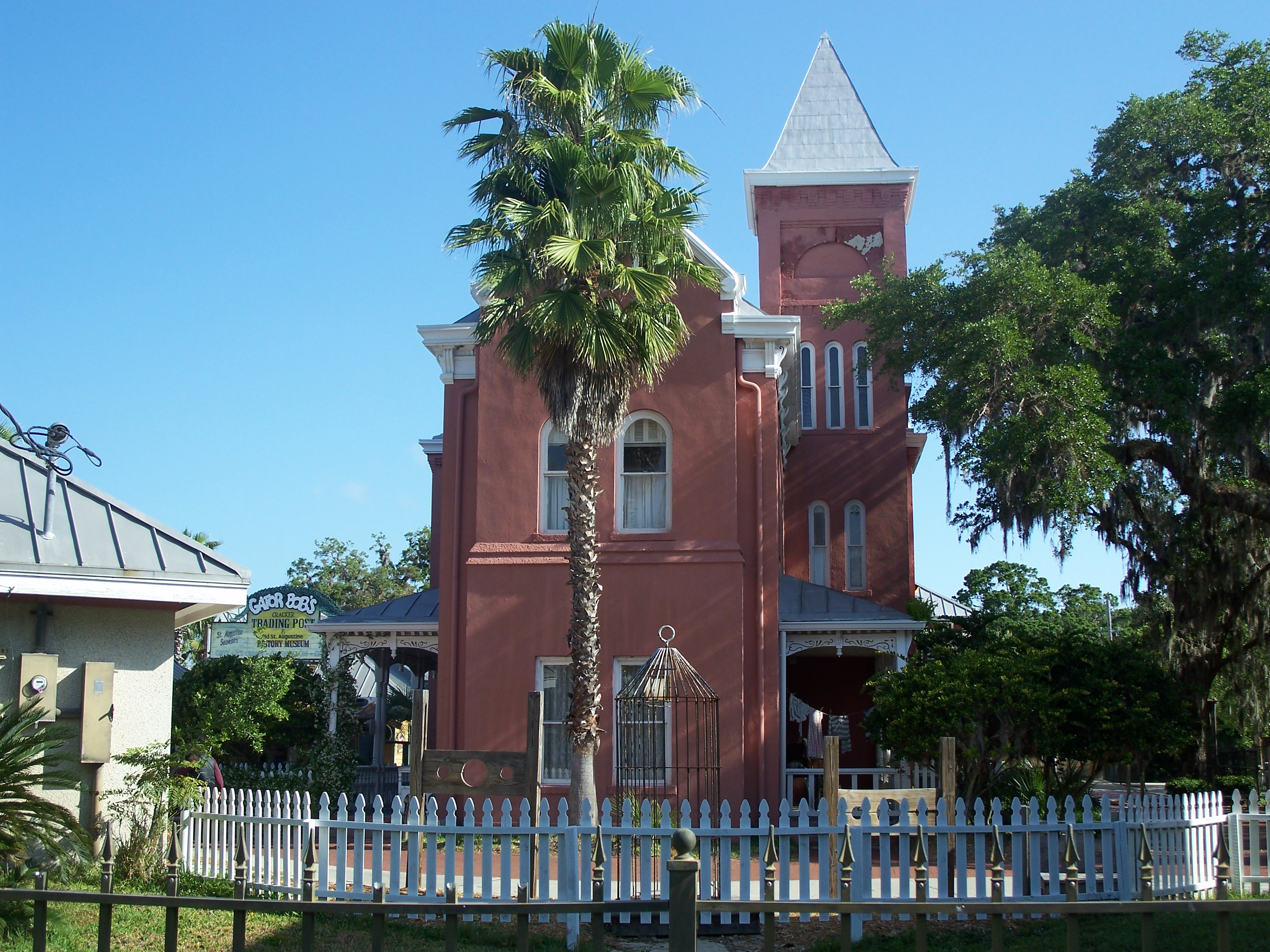
- Location: St. Augustine, Florida
- Coordinates: 29°54′28″N 81°19′8″W
- Architectural style: Romanesque Revival
- NRHP reference No.: 87001427
- Added to NRHP: August 27, 1987

The Old Jail (also known as Authentic Old Jail) is a historic jail in St. Augustine, Florida, United States. It is located at 167 San Marco Avenue. On August 27, 1987, it was added to the U.S. National Register of Historic Places. The St. Johns County Jail now serves as the Old Jail Museum.

== The Old Jail ==
The building was designed and constructed by the P.J. Pauley Jail Building and Manufacturing Company of St. Louis, Missouri in 1891. Its construction was financed by Henry Flagler, who struck a deal with the county for $10,000 because the former jail building stood on land that Flagler needed for the construction of his Ponce de León Hotel. The Old Jail served as the St Johns County Jail until 1953. After the jail facilities were moved to a new, more modern building, the vacant Old Jail building was sold to entrepreneur Henry "Slim" McDaniel who began operating the remarkably well preserved building as a roadside tourist attraction. It was placed on the National Register of Historic Places in 1987.

Originally built to house up to 72 prisoners, the two-story northern wing of the jail consists of a general population and maximum security area, a women's section and a lower level kitchen. Maximum security housed the most dangerous prisoners held at the jail and includes a death row cell, for those condemned to die. A total of eight men were hung from the gallows on the jail compound during its history. Overall conditions at the jail for those serving varying sentences were quite poor by modern standards and prisoners were typically used as free farm laborers during the day. Baths were infrequent, toilet facilities consisted of one bucket per cell and diet was poor and was typically supplemented by any animals that the prisoners might catch while working in the fields. Segregation by race was steadfastly adhered to at the jail and disease, violence and death were commonplace. The two-story southern wing of the jail consists of an office for the sheriff and living quarters for his family.

== Old Jail Museum ==
The Old Jail Museum consists of a restored jail with sheriff's living quarters. It also contains a display of weaponry and a pictorial history of the hangings carried out at the Old Jail, with emphasis on the time the Sheriff CJ Perry was in residence with his family. The Jail is only accessible by guided tour, with costumed guides "processing" in the new prisoners. The Jail also serves as the grand finale to Old Town Trolley's Ghost and Gravestones tour, allowing visitors to access the building by night as well.

== Notable inmates ==
- Dan White—American actor in film and television. Arrested in St. Augustine in November 1930
