= Rockdale County Jail =

- U.S. National Register of Historic Places
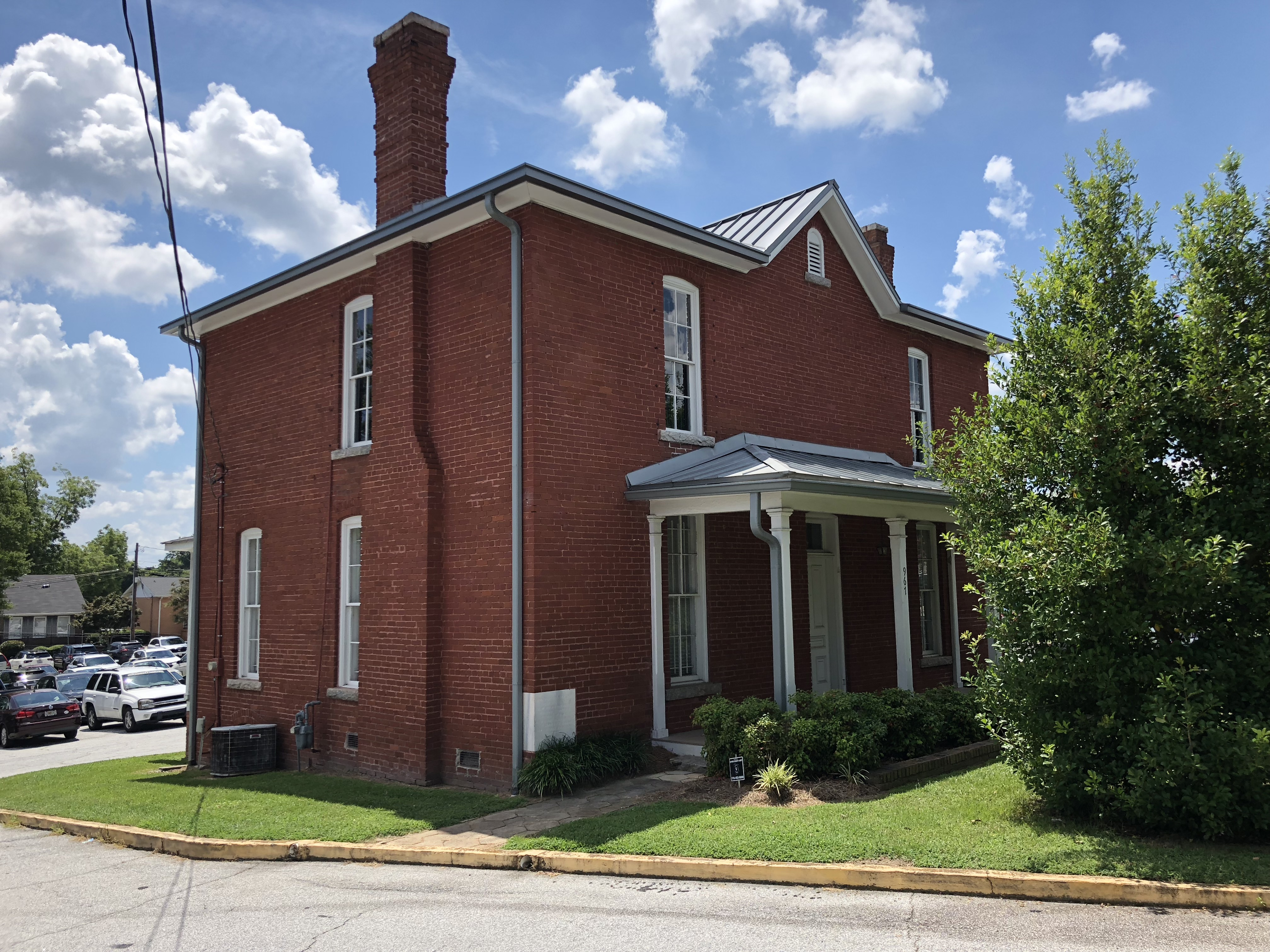

- Location within Georgia
- Location: 967 Milstead Ave. Conyers, Georgia
- Coordinates: 33.66861°N 84.01677°W
- Built: 1897
- Architect: Golucke & Stewart
- NRHP reference No.: 82002462
- Added to NRHP: August 26, 1982

Rockdale County Jail is a historic building at 967 Milstead Ave. in Conyers, Georgia. It was built in 1897 and served as the jail for Rockdale County, Georgia from then until a new jail was built in 1968. It was entered into the National Register of Historic Places (NRHP) on August 26, 1982. It now serves as the headquarters for the Rockdale County Historical Society and is known as the Old Jail Museum.

== History ==
Rockdale County was created in October 1870 from parts of adjacent counties. The new jurisdiction authorized construction of a stone jail in 1872. By 1897 the county had outgrown the original jail. Construction of this replacement jail was authorized and architects Golucke & Stewart were hired to design it with F.P. Heifner as the builder.

The resulting structure is a two-story rectangular building of red brick, with a basement. The building has a hipped roof and iron bars provide security on windows on both levels.

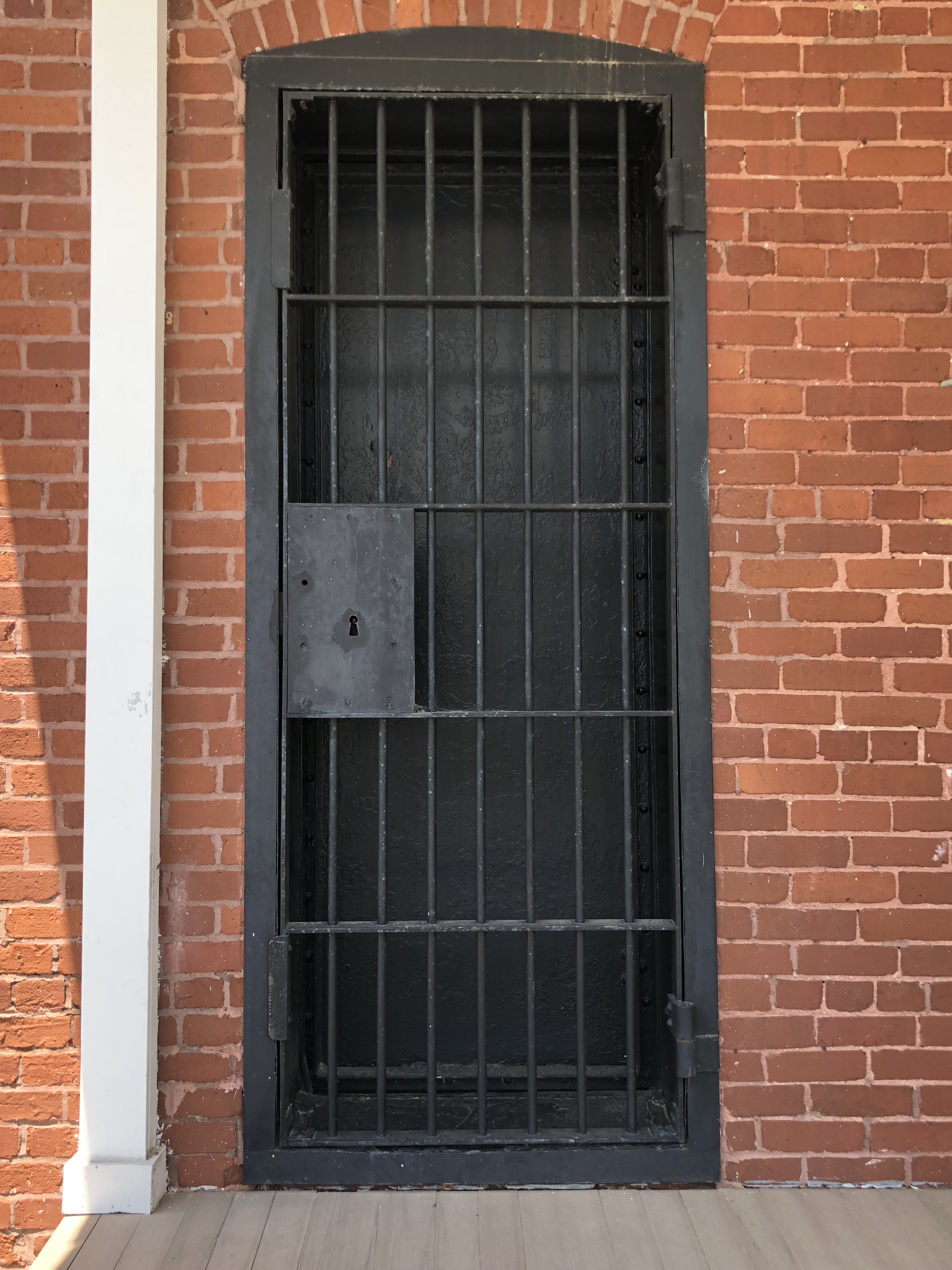
The jail entrance at rear

The first floor contained offices and living quarters for the sheriff and his family. The second floor contains the jail and consists of three rooms. One contains a four-cell jail block, one is the drunk tank and the last is a jailer's room that could serve as a "hanging room" when needed. At the southeast corner of the first floor is an outside entrance that leads directly up to the jail.

Designed and built to be a county jail, the building therefore reflects the state of the art in jail design at the time. J.W. Golucke was "one of the state's foremost courthouse architects" who often designed jails as well. For this project he employed jail equipment from Pauly Jail Building and Manufacturing Co. of St. Louis, Missouri.

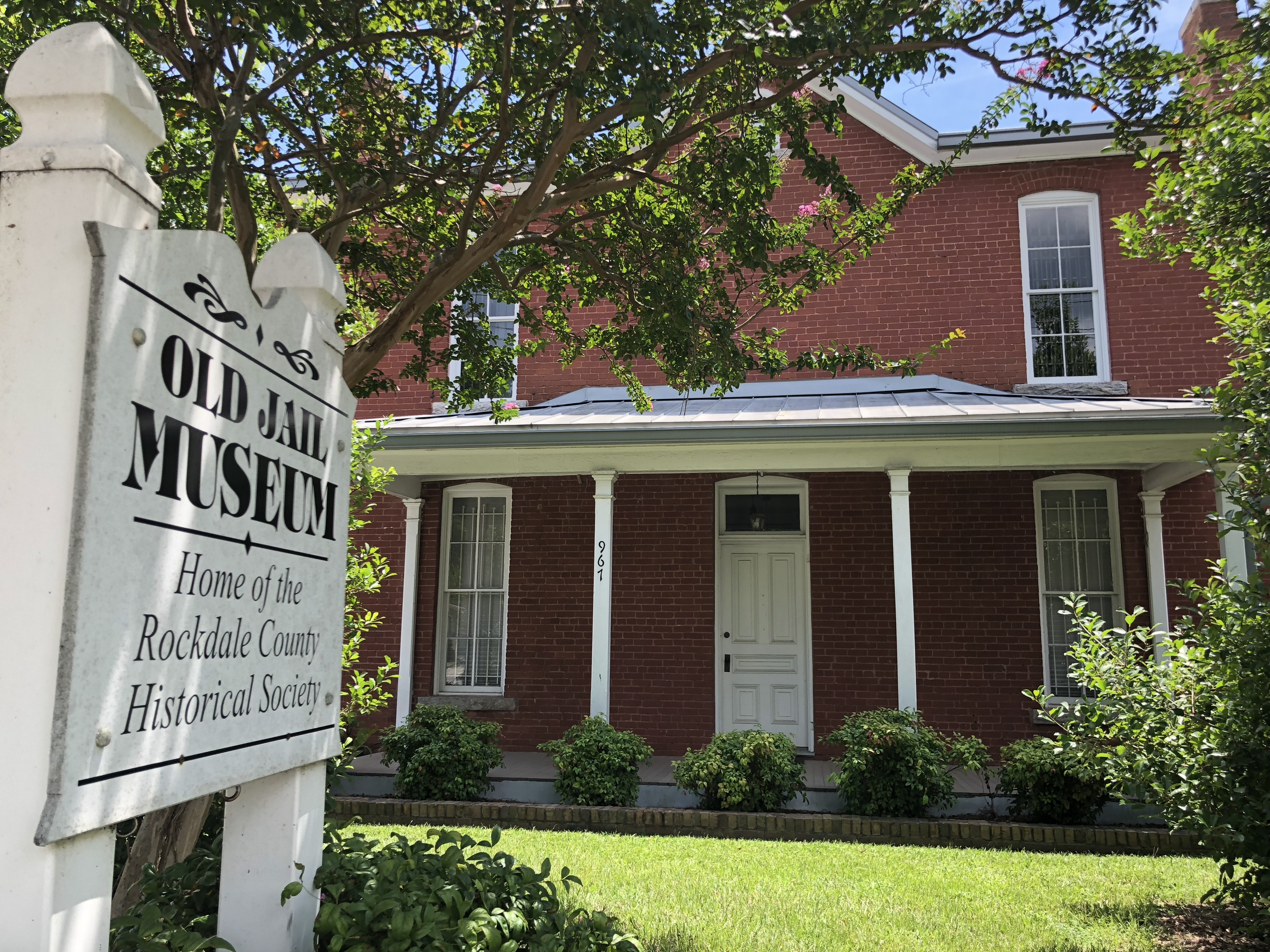
The Old Jail Museum

When a new county jail was built in 1968, this building sat vacant for several years. In 1975 it was bought from the county by the Rockdale County Historical Society, which restored it at a cost of $15,000.

The building is now called the Old Jail Museum. The first floor is now used as offices and museum space. Exhibits include an old television set from 1930 and petticoats from antebellum era weddings. The upper floor containing the jail looks "pretty much as it did ... when prisoners were held there." The cells still contain old graffiti including the names of some incarcerated in the jail.

== See also ==
- National Register of Historic Places listings in Rockdale County, Georgia
