= Old Jail (Muscatine, Iowa) =

- U.S. National Register of Historic Places
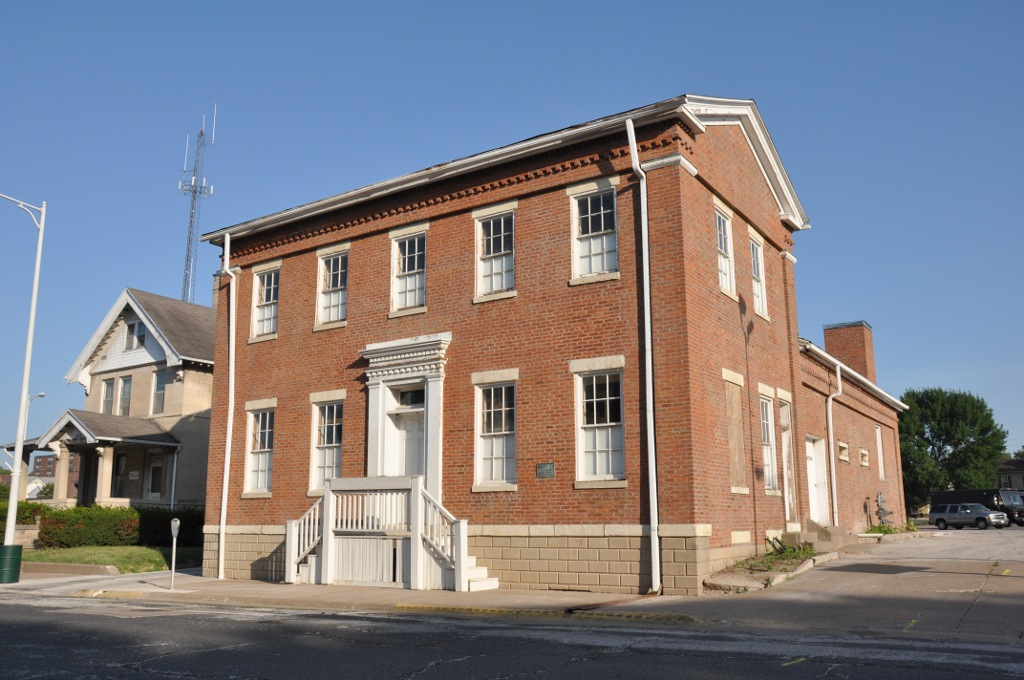

- Location within Iowa Location within the United States
- Location: 411 E. 4th St. Muscatine, Iowa
- Coordinates: 41°25′49″N 91°02′37″W
- Built: 1857
- Architect: Hines & Milford
- NRHP reference No.: 74000801
- Added to NRHP: July 24, 1974

The Old Jail is a historic building located in Muscatine, Iowa, United States. The building was built in 1857 across the street from the Muscatine County Courthouse. It replaced the original county jail that had been built in 1839. It was replaced by the county in 1907. The building was listed on the National Register of Historic Places in 1974.
