= Old Taylor County Jail =

- U.S. National Register of Historic Places
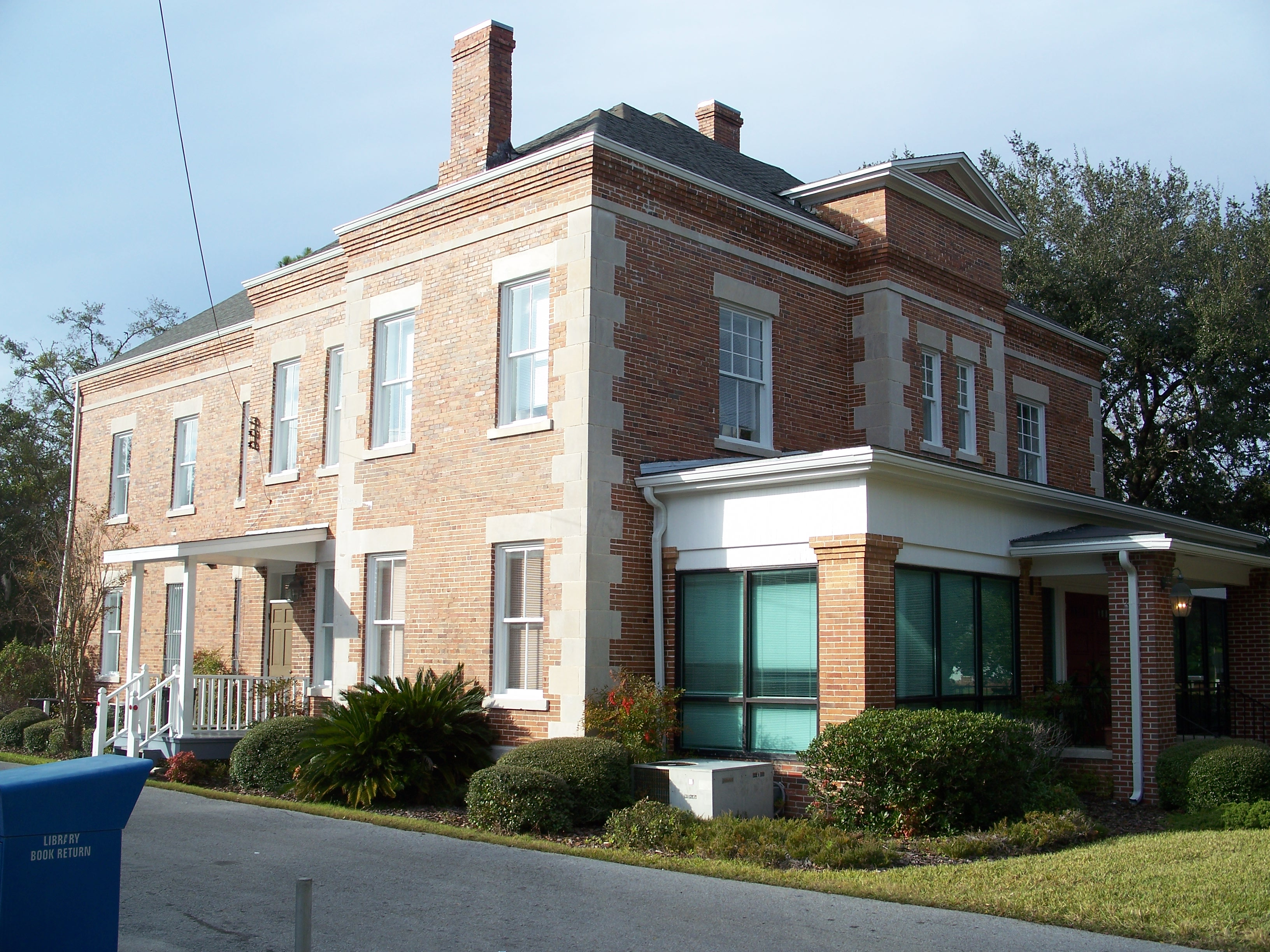

- Location within Florida Location within the United States
- Location: 400 blk. N. Washington St., Perry, Florida
- Coordinates: 30°7′10.2″N 83°34′51.6″W
- Area: 1 acre (0.40 ha)
- Built: 1912
- Architect: Benjamin Bosworth Smith
- Architectural style: Masonry Vernacular
- NRHP reference No.: 89000414
- Added to NRHP: May 11, 1989

The Old Taylor County Jail is a historic jail in Perry, Florida, located on the 400 block of North Washington Street. It was built in 1912 and was listed on the National Register of Historic Places in 1989.

It was deemed significant as the oldest surviving building in Taylor County, Florida and for its close association with John Henry Parker, the longest serving sheriff of the county.

"It was also deemed significant "as one of the few remaining jail-sheriff's residences remaining in Florida" and as an example of the work of Benjamin Bosworth Smith, a prominent architect in the Southeast in the early twentieth century, and as an example of the early twentieth century use of reinforced concrete."

Benjamin Bosworth Smith had designed the Taylor County Courthouse a few years earlier.
