= List of jail and prison museums =

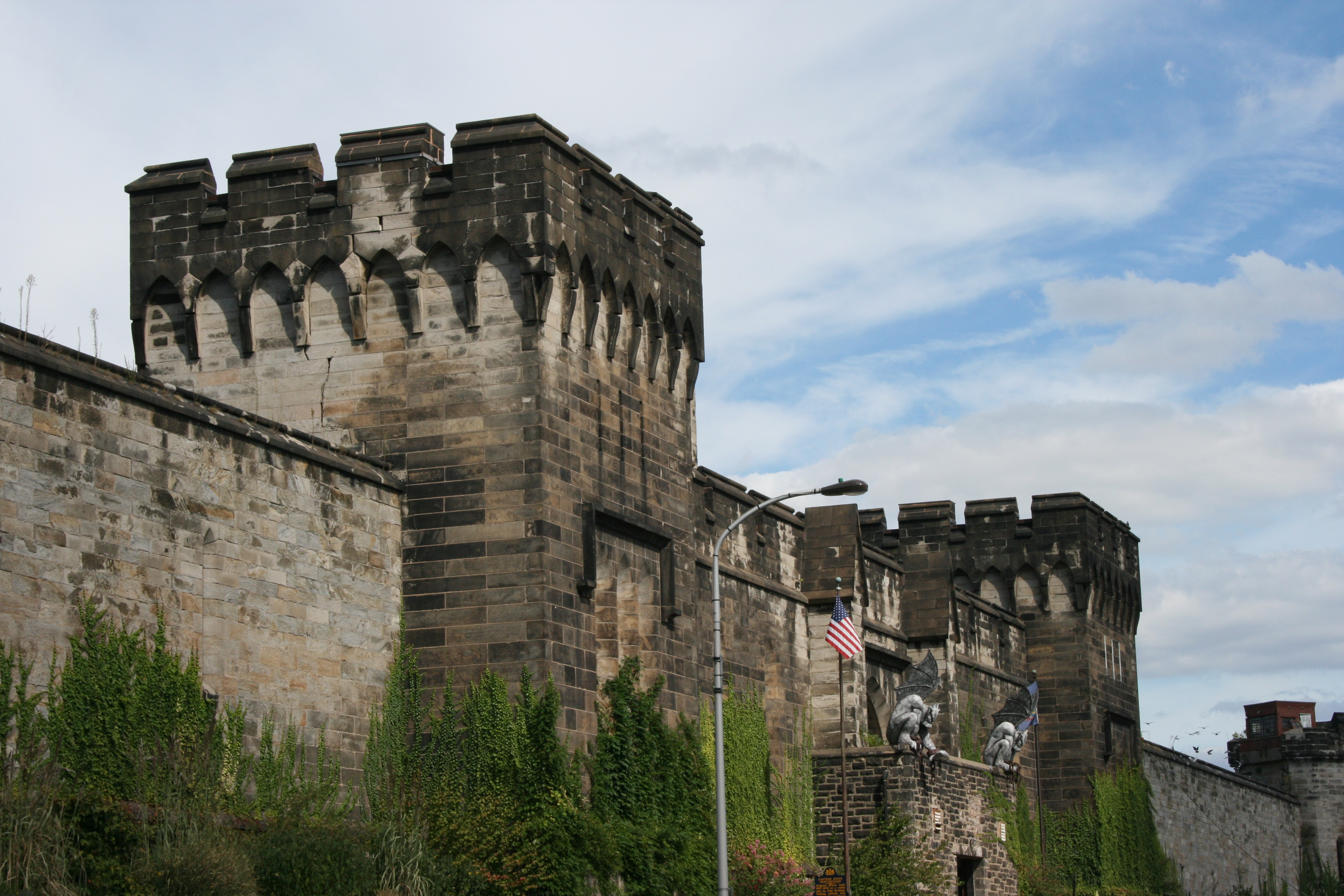
Eastern State Penitentiary in Philadelphia

Museums have been created from many former jails and prisons.

Some old jails converted into museums are listed under the original name of the jail, especially if listed on the US National Register of Historic Places. For example, see Old St. Johns County Jail in St Augustine, Florida.

Museums with a main purpose not associated with the jail or prison in which they are located are listed separately, below the main list.

Name	Location	State/Province	Country	Jail/ Prison	Notes
Adelaide Gaol	Adelaide	South Australia	Australia	Prison	
Seodaemun Prison	Seoul	Seoul Capital Area	South Korea	Prison	
1811 Lincoln County Museum & Old Jail	Wiscasset	Maine	United States	Jail	
Brushy Mountain State Penitentiary	Petros	Tennessee	United States	State Prison	
Abashiri Prison Museum	Abashiri	Hokkaido	Japan	Prison	The only prison museum in Japan.
Alcatraz Island	San Francisco Bay Area	California	United States	Prison	
Ancienne Prison de Trois-Rivières	Trois-Rivières	Quebec	Canada	Prison	
Beaumaris Gaol	Beaumaris	Anglesey, Wales	United Kingdom	Jail	
Bodmin Gaol	Bodmin	Cornwall	United Kingdom	Jail	http://www.bodminjail.org/
Buckingham Old Gaol	Buckingham	Buckinghamshire	United Kingdom	Jail	Museum of Buckingham and rural life as well as the building as a prison
Burlington County Prison	Mount Holly	New Jersey	United States	Prison	
Carthage Jail	Carthage	Illinois	United States	Jail	location of the death of Joseph Smith, founder of the Latter Day Saint movement
Cell Block 7 Prison Museum, State Prison of Southern Michigan	Jackson, Michigan	Michigan	United States	Prison	Closed as of December 2019.
Central Penitentiary	San José	San José Province	Costa Rica	Prison	
Cellular Jail	Port Blair	Andaman and Nicobar Islands	India	Prison	Many Indian Independence activists were kept in this prison by the British during the British Raj in India.
Clink, The	London	London Borough of Southwark	United Kingdom	Prison	
Cork City Gaol	Cork	County Cork	Ireland	Prison	
Crumlin Road (HM Prison)	Belfast	Northern Ireland	United Kingdom	Prison	
Daviess County Rotary Jail and Sheriff's Residence	Gallatin	Missouri	United States	Jail	Rotary Jail
Eastern State Penitentiary	Philadelphia	Pennsylvania	United States	Prison	
Eden Camp Museum	Malton	North Yorkshire	United Kingdom	Prison	
Ely Museum	Ely	Cambridgeshire	United Kingdom	Jail	Official website
Fremantle Prison	Fremantle	Western Australia	Australia	Prison	
Galleries of Justice	Nottingham	Nottinghamshire	United Kingdom	Jail and Prison	
Gevangenpoort	The Hague	South Holland	Netherlands	Prison	
Gloucester Prison	Gloucester	Gloucestershire	United Kingdom	Prison	
Hexham Old Gaol	Hexham	Northumberland	United Kingdom	Prison	
Historic Cornwall Jail	Cornwall	Ontario	Canada	Jail	
Hong Kong Correctional Services Museum	Southern District	Stanley	Hong Kong	Prison	Official webpage The museum comprises ten galleries with one mock gallows and two mock cells.
Horsens Statsfængsel (Horsens Prison Museum)	Horsens	Region Midtjylland	Denmark	Prison	Official website
Inveraray Jail	Inveraray	Argyll, Scotland	United Kingdom		
Jail Museum (Truckee, California)	Truckee	California	United States	Jail	
Kansas Regional Prisons Museum	Lansing	Kansas	United States	Prison	The Lansing Historical Museum is home to hundreds of artifacts and documents relating to the Kansas State Penitentiary/Lansing Correctional Facility.
Kilmainham Gaol	Kilmainham	Dublin	Ireland	Prison	
Kingston Penitentiary	Kingston	Ontario	Canada	Prison	Constructed 1833–1835, Kingston Penitentiary is the oldest standing prison dating to pre-confederation in Canada. After closing in 2013, the institution began operating tours seasonally from May–October, offering guided tours with online ticketing and Tour Guides as well as retired Correctional Staff on site to provide information to guests.
Cobourg Jail	Cobourg	Ontario	Canada	Jail	Part of the jail is incorporated into the King George Inn, which includes a museum and artifacts from its time as a working jail.
Kirillo-Belozersky Monastery	Beloozero	Vologda Oblast	Russia	Prison	
Kosciusko County Jail Museum	Warsaw	Indiana	United States	Jail	
Liberty Jail	Liberty	Missouri	United States	Jail	Joseph Smith, founder of the Latter Day Saint movement, and associates were imprisoned there in 1838–1839 during the 1838 Mormon War.
Littledean Jail		Gloucestershire	United Kingdom	Jail	https://www.littledeanjail.com
L'Orignal Old Jail	Original	Ontario	Canada	Jail	
Louisiana State Penitentiary	Angola	Louisiana	United States	Prison	"Opening in 1997, the Museum at the Louisiana State Penitentiary was established to preserve the long and storied history of crime, punishment, rehabilitation, criminal justice, and reform in Louisiana." http://angolamuseum.org/ The Louisiana State Penitentiary also has an annual Prison Rodeo, which first began in 1965. The first public Angola Prison Rodeo was in 1967.
Lubyanka (KGB)	Moscow	Moscow Oblast	Russia	Prison	On Lubyanka Square
Ludwigsburg Prison Museum	Ludwigsburg	Baden-Württemberg	Germany	Prison	
Malaysia Prison Museum	Malacca City	Malacca	Malaysia	Prison	
Memorial and Education Centre Andreasstrasse	Erfurt	Thuringia	Germany	Prison	Former Stasi prison, used for holding political prisoners.
Mills County Old Jail Museum	Goldwaite	Texas	United States	Jail	
Missouri State Penitentiary	Jefferson City	Missouri	United States	Prison	
Montgomery County Jail and Sheriff's Residence	Crawfordsville	Indiana	United States	Jail	Rotary Jail
Moore County Old Jail Museum	Lynchburg	Tennessee	United States	Jail	
Museu Penitenciário do Estado do Rio de Janeiro	Rio de Janeiro	Rio de Janeiro	Brazil	Prison	
Musée national des beaux-arts du Québec	Quebec City	Quebec	Canada	Prison	Mostly an art museum
Museo de Tradiciones y Leyendas	León	León Department	Nicaragua	Jail	
Museo del Presidio de Ushuaia	Ushuaia	Tierra del Fuego	Argentina	Prison	http://museomaritimo.com/
Nationaal Gevangenismuseum	Veenhuizen	Drenthe	Netherlands	Prison	National Dutch prison museum
Newcastle Gaol Museum	Toodyay	Western Australia	Australia		
Norwegian POW Museum	Ostrzeszów	Greater Poland Voivodeship, also known as Wielkopolska Province	Poland	Prison	World War II POW camp
Ohio State Reformatory	Mansfield	Ohio	United States	Prison	
Old Courthouse & Old Jailhouse Museums	West Bend, Wisconsin	Wisconsin	United States	Jail	Operated by Washington County Historical Society, Inc.
Old Franklin County Jail in the former Franklin County Jail	Chambersburg	Pennsylvania	United States	Jail	
Hamilton County Historical Museum in the Old Hamilton County Jail	Jasper	Florida	United States	Jail	Web page
Old Tolland County Jail and Museum	Tolland	Connecticut	United States	Jail	
Old City Jail (Mount Dora, Florida)	Mount Dora	Florida	United States	Jail	Currently houses the Royellou Museum.
Old Fauquier County Jail	Warrenton	Virginia	United States	Jail	
Old Idaho State Penitentiary	Boise	Idaho	United States	Prison	
1859 Jail and Museum	Independence	Missouri	United States	Jail	Website
Olde Gaol Museum	Lindsay	Ontario	Canada	Jail	Website
Old Jail Museum (Albion, Indiana)	Albion	Indiana	United States	Jail	
Old Jail Museum (Allegan, Michigan)	Allegan	Michigan	United States	Jail	
Old Jail Museum (Barnesville, Georgia)	Barnesville	Georgia	United States	Jail	
Old Jail Museum (Canton, Mississippi)	Canton	Mississippi	United States	Jail	
Old Jail Museum (Conyers, Georgia) in the former Rockdale County Jail	Conyers	Georgia	United States	Jail	
Old Jail Museum (Crawfordsville, Indiana)	Crawfordsville	Indiana	United States	Jail	
Old Jail Museum (Dubuque, Indiana) in the former Dubuque County Jail	Dubuque	Iowa	United States	Jail	
Old Jail Museum (Gonzales, Texas)	Gonzales	Texas	United States	Jail	
Old Jail Museum (Goochland, Virginia)	Goochland	Virginia	United States	Jail	
Old Jail Museum (Greenwood, Arkansas)	Greenwood	Arkansas	United States	Jail	
Old Jail Museum (Jim Thorpe, Pennsylvania)	Jim Thorpe	Pennsylvania	United States	Jail	
Old Jail Museum (Iola, Kansas)	Iola	Kansas	United States	Jail	information
Old Jail Museum (Knoxville, Georgia)	Knoxville	Georgia	United States	Jail	
Old Jail Museum (Lawrenceburg, Tennessee)	Lawrenceburg	Tennessee	United States	Jail	
Old Jail Museum (Smethport, Pennsylvania)	Smethport	Pennsylvania	United States	Jail	
Old Jail Museum (Silverton, Texas)	Silverton	Texas	United States	Jail	
Old Jail Museum (St. Augustine, Florida) in the Old St. Johns County Jail	St. Augustine	Florida	United States	Jail	
Old Jail Museum (Taylorsville, North Carolina)	Taylorsville	North Carolina	United States	Jail	
Old Jail Museum (Thompson Falls, Montana)	Thompson	Montana	United States	Jail	
Old Jail Museum (Valparaiso, Indiana)	Valparaiso	Indiana	United States	Jail	
Old Jail Museum (Winchester, Tennessee)	Winchester	Tennessee	United States	Jail	
Old Joliet Prison	Joliet	Illinois	United States	Prison	
Old Melbourne Jail	Melbourne	Victoria	Australia	Convict Prison	
Old Newgate Prison	East Granby	Connecticut	United States	Prison	Former mine/Colonial prison; also spelled "Old New-Gate Prison"
Old Prison (Victoria)	Ċittadella	Victoria, Gozo	Malta	Prison	Official webpage
Old Prison Museum (Deer Lodge, Montana)	Deer Lodge	Montana	United States	Prison	
Old Wilkes Jail (Wilkesboro, North Carolina)	Wilkesboro	North Carolina	United States	Jail	Tom Dooley of the song "Hang Down Your Head Tom Dooley" was held here before his trial.
Patarei Prison	Tallinn	Harju County	Estonia	Prison	Official webpage
Peter and Paul Fortress	St. Petersburg	St. Petersburg	Russia	Prison	
Peterhead Prison	Peterhead	Aberdeenshire	Scotland	Convict Prison	
Pied-du-Courant Prison	Montreal	Quebec	Canada	Prison	
Port Arthur	Port Arthur	Tasmania	Australia	Convict Prison	
Pottawattamie County Jail	Council Bluffs	Iowa	United States	Jail	Rotary Jail
Presidio Modelo	Nueva Gerona	Isla de la Juventud	Cuba	Prison	
Prison Museum of Sweden	Gävle	Gävleborg County	Sweden	Prison	Official webpage The museum documents Swedish incarceration and punishment from the 16th to the late 20th century
Qasr Prison (Qasr museum-Qarden)	Tehran	Tehran	Iran	Prison	Official webpage
Richard III Museum	York	North Yorkshire	United Kingdom	Prison	Primarily about Richard III, the museum also has a working portcullis, a medieval execution chamber, and a small prison cell
Robben Island Museum	Robben Island	Western Cape	South Africa	Prison	
Sabine County Jail Museum and Vergie Speights Memorial Library	Hemphill	Texas	United States	Jail	
San Jacinto County Jail	Coldspring	Texas	United States	Jail	
Shepton Mallet Prison	Shepton Mallet	Somerset	United Kingdom	Prison	
Shrewsbury Prison	Shrewsbury	Shropshire	United Kingdom	Prison	
Solovetsky Monastery	Solovetsky Islands		Russia		
Texas Prison Museum	Huntsville	Texas	United States	Prison	
Anti-sabotage joint committee Prison (Ebrat Museum of Iran)	Tehran	Tehran	Iran	Prison	ebratmuseum.ir//
Tuol Sleng Genocide Museum	Phnom Penh		Cambodia	Prison	
Ulucanlar Prison Museum	Altındağ	Ankara	Turkey	Prison	www.ulucanlarcezaevimuzesi.com
West Virginia Penitentiary	Moundsville	West Virginia	United States	Prison	www.wvpentours.com
Wicklow Gaol	Wicklow	County Wicklow	Ireland	Prison	Irish National Monument
Wilson County Jailhouse Museum	Floresville	Texas	United States	Jail	
Wyoming Frontier Prison (Rawlins, Wyoming)	Rawlins	Wyoming	United States	Prison	
Wyoming Territorial Prison (Laramie, Wyoming)	Laramie	Wyoming	United States	Prison	www.wyomingterritorialprison.com//
Yuma Territorial Prison	Yuma	Arizona	United States	Prison	

== See also ==
- List of museums in the United States
