= List of museums in Nicaragua =

There is a wide selection of museums in Nicaragua. This is a list of museums and historical sites throughout the country.

== Museums and historical sites in Nicaragua ==
=== General museums ===
- Alfabetización Museum - Managua
- Casa Salud DeBayle - León
- Museo Comunitario de San Rafael del Sur - Jinotega
- Museo de Antropología e Historia Natural de Rivas - Rivas
- Museo del Cacao y del Chocolate - Granada
- Museo del Café - Matagalpa
- Museos El Ceibo - Numismática, Ometepe
- National Museum of Julio Cortazar - Managua

=== Anthropology museums ===
- Gregorio Aguilar Barea Museum - Chontales
- Museo "Cacique Adiac" - León
- Museo de Arte Sacro de Subtiava - Rivas
- El Museo de Tradiciones y Leyendas - León
- Museo Imabite - León
- Museo Santo Domingo de Guzmán - Managua

=== Archaeological sites ===
- Huellas de Acahualinca - Ancient footprints of Acahualinca, Managua
- León Viejo, Sitio Arqueológico – León Viejo archaeological site, León Department
- Ometepe, Sitio Arqueológico - Ometepe archaeological site, Ometepe
- Placeres Sitio Arqueológico - Los Placeres, Managua
- Sitio Arqueológico Quebrada de Arrancabarba - Matagalpa
- Zapatera, Sitio Arqueológico - Zapatera archaeological site, Isla Zapatera

=== Archaeology museums ===
- Museo Arqueológico César Salgado de Condega - Estelí
- Museo Arqueológico de Altagracia - Rivas
- Museo Arqueológico de Cerámica Precolombina - Granada
- Museo Arqueológico de Pueblo Nuevo - Estelí
- Museo Arqueológico de Somoto Somoto
- Museo Arqueológico "Gregorio Aguilar Barea" - Chontales
- Sitio Arqueológico Petroglifos del Cailagua - Masaya
- Museo Arqueológico Tenderi - Masaya
- Museo Sitio Huellas de Acahualinca - Ancient footprints of Acahualinca, Managua
- Museos El Ceibo - Arqueología, Ometepe

=== Art museums ===
- Archivo Fílmico de la Cinemateca Nacional - Managua
- Centro de Arte Fundación Ortiz Gurdián - León
- Julio Cortázar Museum - Managua
- Museo del Convento de San Francisco - Granada

=== History museums ===
- Historical ex-combatants museum - Estelí
- Mansión Museo de Granada - Granada
- Museo Archivo "Alfonso Cortés" - León
- Museo Casa Hacienda San Jacinto - Managua
- Museo Casa Natal de Rubén Darío - Matagalpa
- Museo Casa Natal Sor María Romero - Granada
- Museo de Antropología e Historia de Rivas - Rivas
- Museo de la Revolución - Managua
- Museo General Sandino - Jinotega
- Museo Histórico Municipal de Corinto - Managua
- Museo Histórico Religioso de Sébaco - Matagalpa
- Museo Parque Loma de Tiscapa - Managua
- Museo Precolombino de Chaguitillo - Matagalpa
- Museo Sitio El Castillo de la Fortaleza de la Inmaculada Concepción - El Castillo
- Nicarao Museum of Anthropology and History - Rivas
- Rubén Darío Archive-Museum - León
- Rubén Darío House-Museum - Ciudad Darío

=== Monuments, sites, and parks ===
- Exposition Zapatera Collection - Granada
- Masaya Volcano Museum - Masaya
- Museo del Arbol El Genízaro - León
- Museo Sitio Histórico Ruinas de León Viejo - León
- Parque Nacional Archipielago de Zapatera - Granada
- Parque Nacional Volcán Santiago - Masaya
- Reserva Natural Laguna de Apoyo - Granada
- Reserva Natural Meseta Tisey - Salto La Estanzuela, Estelí
- Reserva Natural Volcán Cosiguina - Chinandega
- Reserva Natural Volcán Mombacho - Granada

=== Natural history museums ===
- Museo del Departamento de Malacología UCA - Managua
- Museo de Ometepe - Rivas
- Museo Ecológico de Diriamba - Diriamba
- Museo entomológico - San Juan del Sur
- Museo Gemológico de la Concha y el Caracol - Managua
- Museo Paleontológico "El Hato" - Managua
- Museos de Geología UNAN - Managua
- Museum Ecológico de Trópico Seco - Diriamba
- Sitio Paleontológico El Bosque - Estelí
