= Ludovica Thornam =

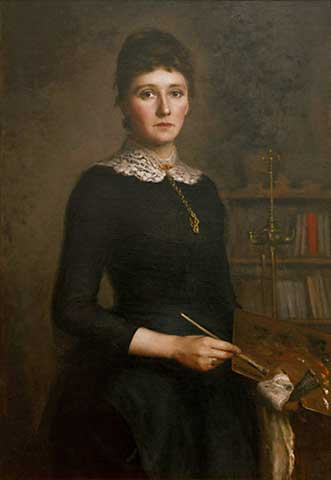
- Self-portrait, 1885
- Born: November 30, 1853; Horsens, Denmark
- Died: May 27, 1896 (aged 42); Copenhagen, Denmark
- Relatives: Emmy Thornam (sister)

Ludovica Anine Vilhelmine Augusta Thornam (30 November 1853 – 27 May 1896) was a Danish portrait and genre painter.

== Biography ==
Ludovica Thornam was born at Horsens in Jutland, Denmark. She was the daughter of Ludvig Thornam (1819–79) and Anine Charlotte Frederikke Norup (1824–95). Her father was a senior teacher (Overlærer). Her sister, Emmy Thornam (1852–1935), also became a painter as well as a writer.

She began her artistic training at Horsens Tekniske Skole in Horsens and, encouraged by her parents, went to Copenhagen where she studied with Vilhelm Kyhn (1819–1903) at his private school from 1873 to 1874. At that time, women were not permitted to attend The Royal Danish Academy of Fine Arts, so she continued her studies with Herman Siegumfeldt (1833–1912) until 1877.

She settled on a career as a portrait painter and had her first exhibition in 1878. Soon, she became quite popular and received numerous commissions from the local gentry. She and her sister, Emmy, were two of the very few women at that time who were able to make a living from their art. In 1887, she received a grant from the Ministry of Culture (Kultusministeriet) which enabled her to study at the Académie Julian in Paris, under the direction of Jules Lefebvre (1836–1911). A later supplementary grant from Den Raben-Levetzauske Fond gave her a chance to study in Rome. From 1893 to 1894, she paid another visit to France and Italy with Emmy. In Paris, she took lessons from Louis Héctor Leroux (1829–1900).

She was a regular participant in the Charlottenborg Spring Exhibition and had a major showing at the Women's Exhibition in 1895. After 1889, she was also an occasional exhibitor at the Paris Salon.

Throughout her life, she maintained a traditional painting style, derived from the Danish Golden Age and French Academicism, although her colors and lines softened a little after her last stay in Paris. Her genre works never became as well known as her portraits. She never married and died in Copenhagen after a long illness.

== Selected paintings ==
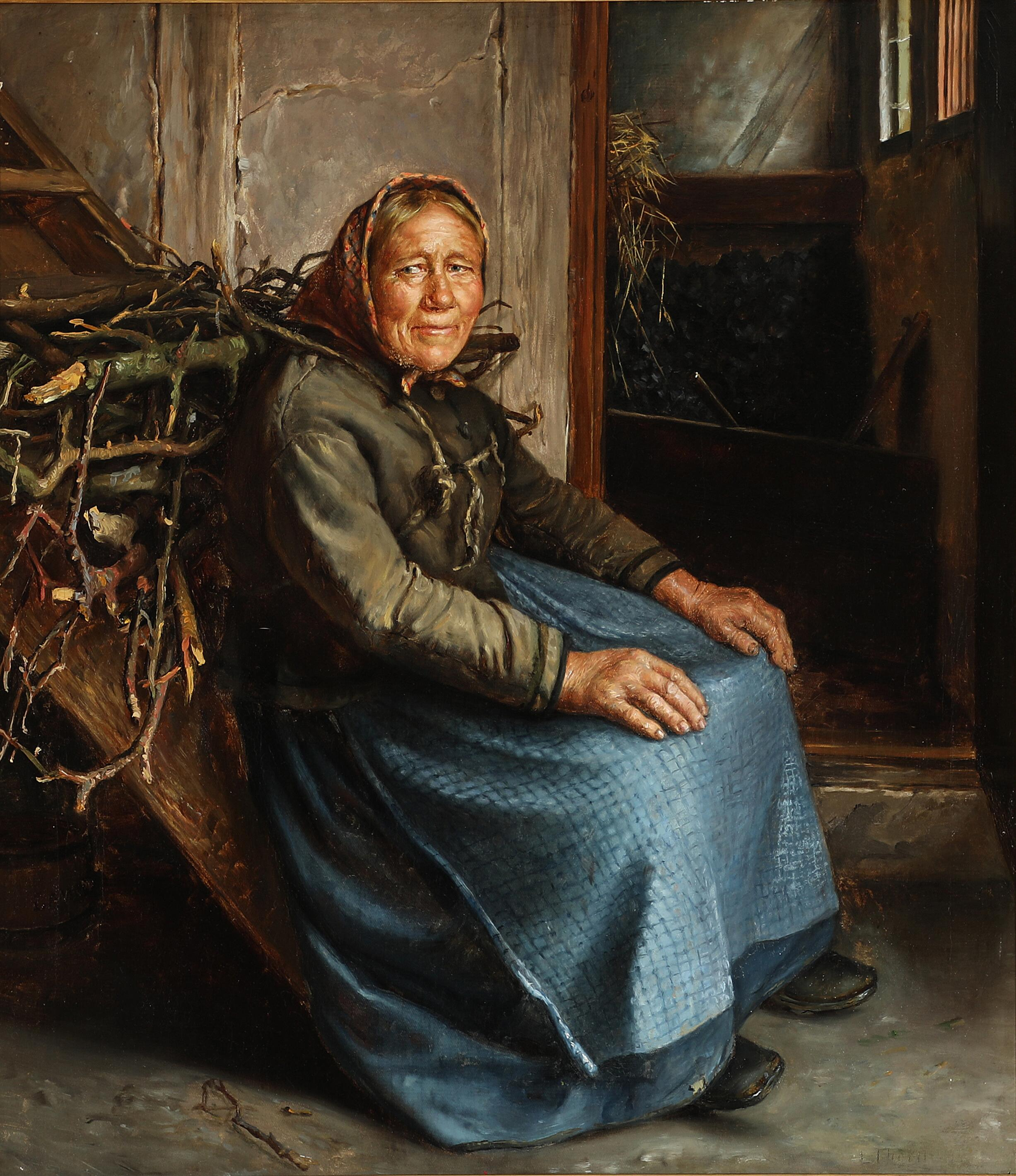
An Old Firewood Collector

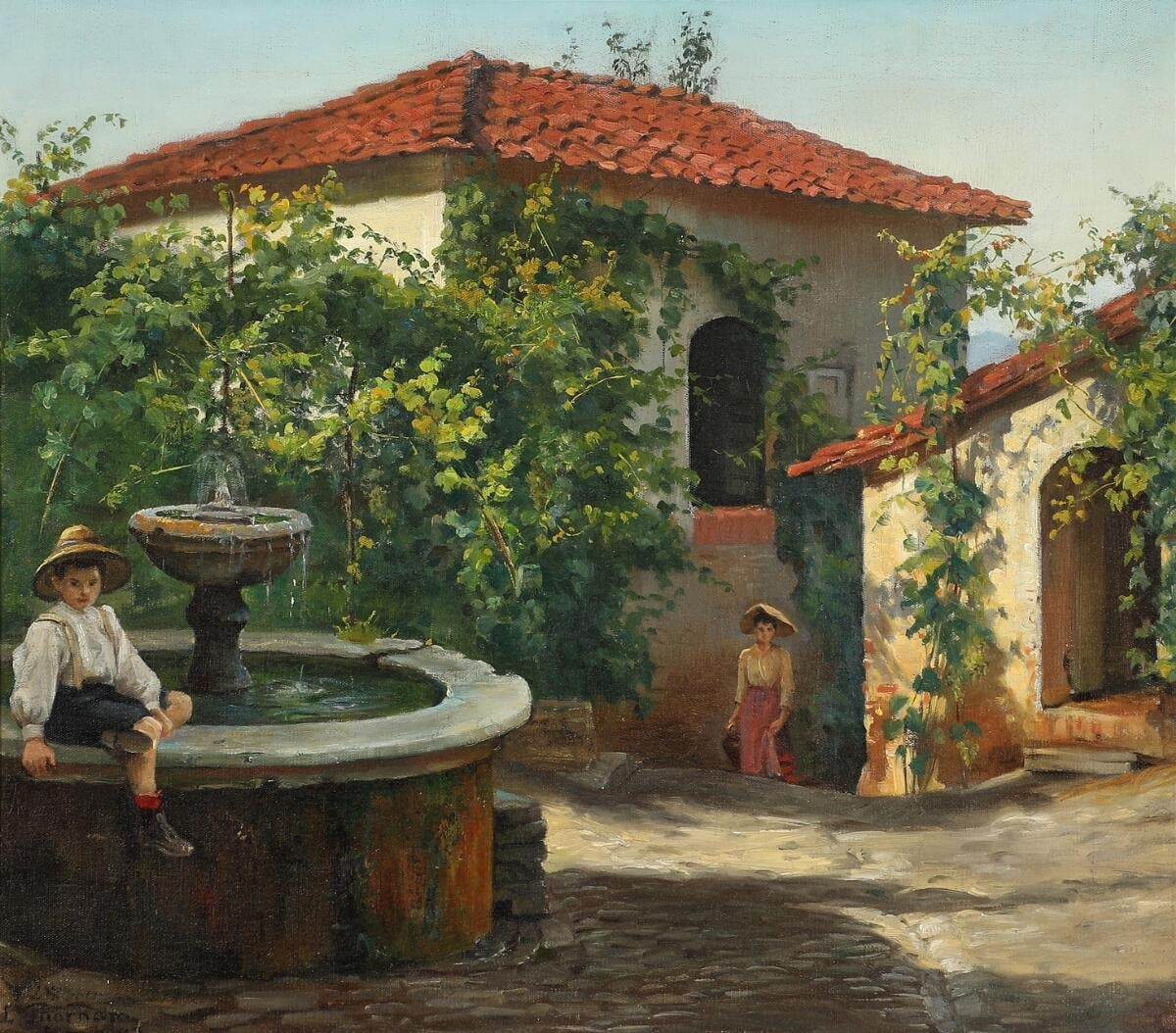
Street View in Siena

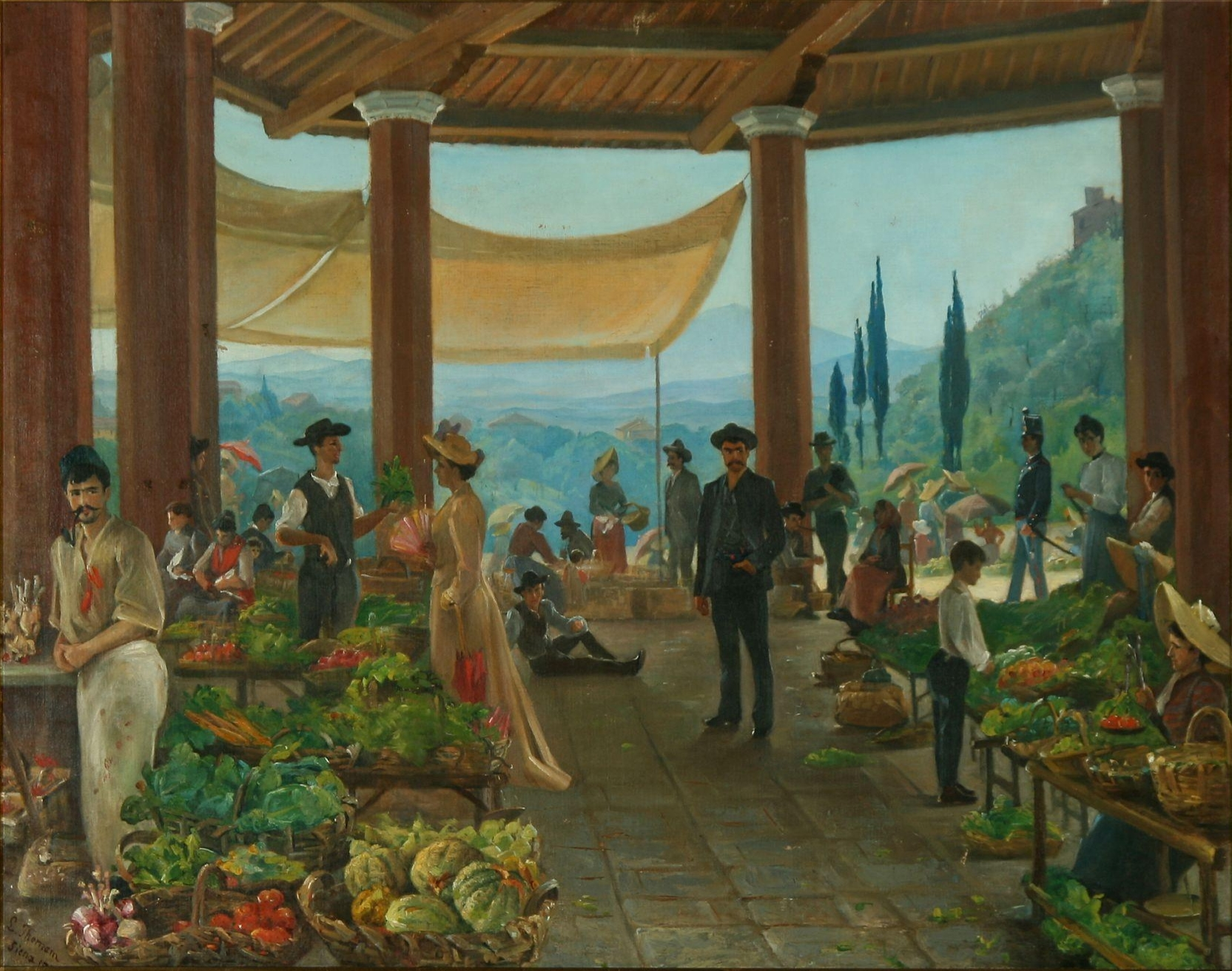
Noblewoman at a Fair in Siena

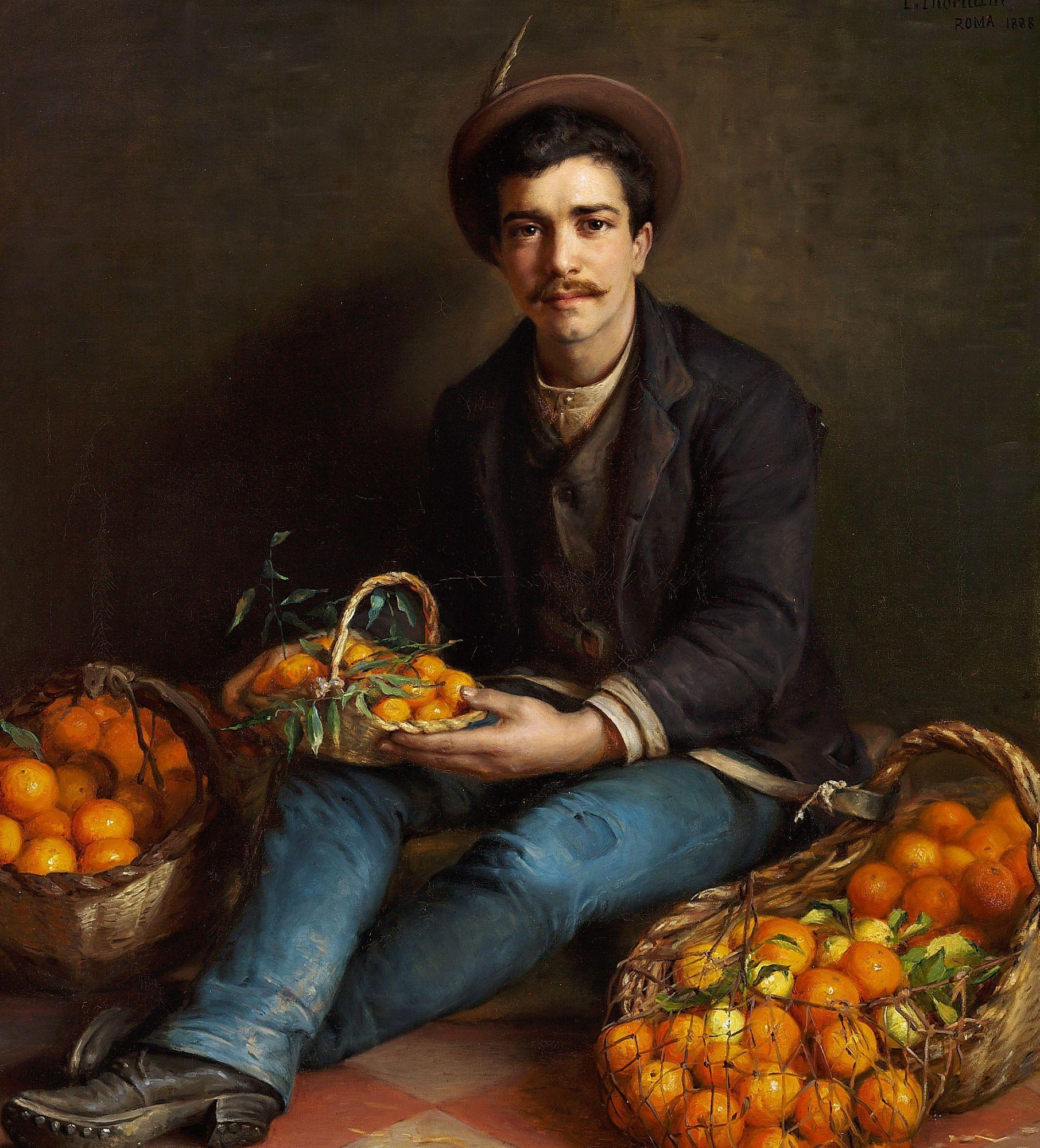
A Roman Orange Seller
