= Emmy Thornam =

Danish painter (1852–1935)

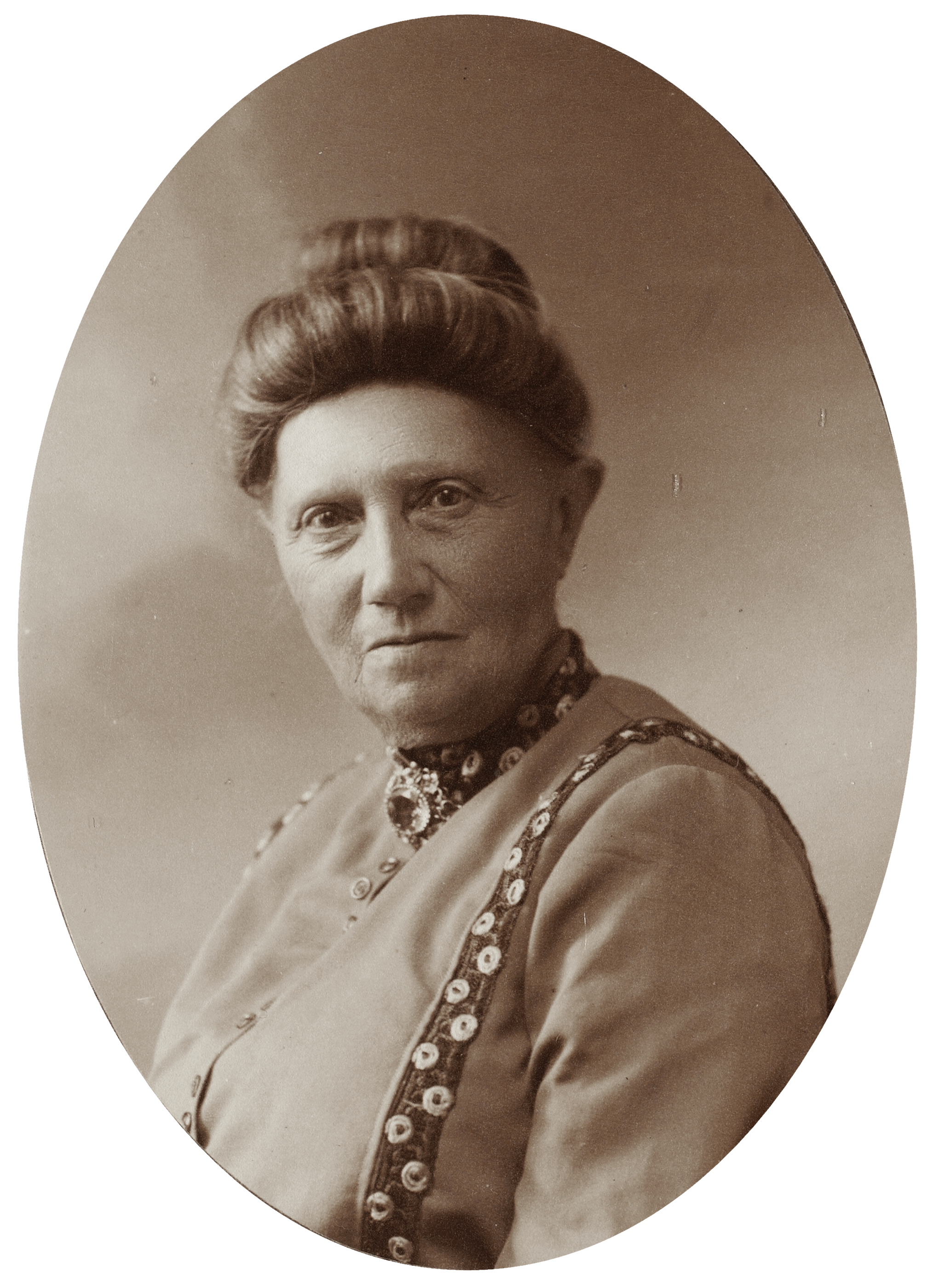
Emmy Thornam

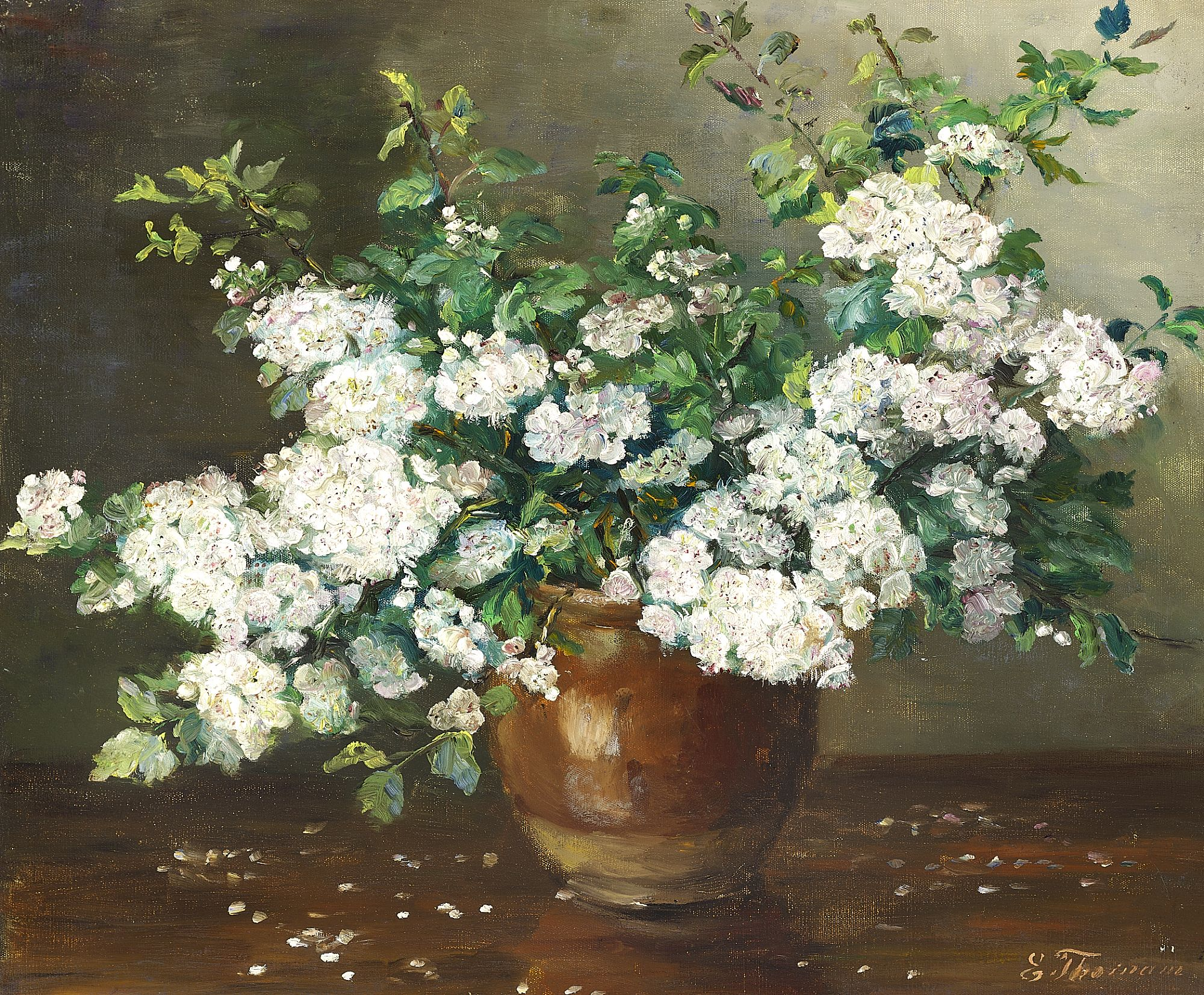
Hvidtjørn (White Hawthorn), painting by Emmy Thornam (c. 1912)

Emmy Marie Caroline Thornam (1852–1935) was a self-supporting Danish artist who specialized in flower painting. Initially trained in landscaping, she was later a student of the Danish flower-painter Oluf August Hermansen before completing her studies in Paris under the French flower painter Pierre Bourgogne. In later life, she wrote novels as well as her own memoirs. Her paintings are in the collections of several Danish museums. Her younger sister, Ludovica Thornam, is also remembered as a painter.

== Early life and education ==
Born in Horsens on 10 March 1852, Emmy Marie Caroline Thornam was the daughter of the high-school teacher Ludvig Thornam (1819–1879) and his wife Anine Charlotte Frederikke née Norup (1824–1895). She was raised on the Hanstegaard estate in a well-to-do environment. Interested in drawing from an early age, Thornam was given an excellent education which included the Technical School in Horsens and Vilhelm Kyhn's Art School for Women (Tegneskole for Kvinder) from 1873 to 1875. She was later a pupil of the Danish flower painter Oluf August Hermansen and, while in Paris, of the French flower painter Pierre Bourgogne. Together with her sister, she made study trips to Paris (1887–1888) and Italy (1893–1894). In 1901, she traveled to Corsica, Italy and Algeria.

== Career ==
Thornam first exhibited at the Charlottenborg Spring Exhibition in 1882 and continued to exhibit there every year for the rest of her life. She specialized in flower painting as she knew there would be a market for her works. As a result, she was one of the few women of her day who was able to make a living as a painter.

In later life, Thornam discovered she could also be successful as a writer. In 1922, she published a collection of short stories: Den gamle klokker og andre fortællinger and in 1922 Erindringer fra Syden (Memories from the South). In 1932, she published her memoirs Min søster og jeg (My Sister and I).

Emmy Thornam died in Copenhagen on 7 January 1935.
