= Southeast Jutland =

Southern part of East Jutland, Denmark

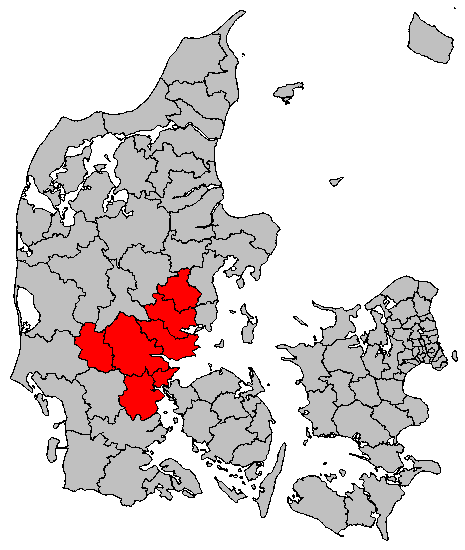
Municipalities of Southeast Jutland

Southeast Jutland is the southern part of East Jutland. The area roughly correlates to the old Vejle County and in some context also Skanderborg Kommune and Billund Kommune. As of January 2025, the population of the area was 509,962.

Administratively, Southeast Jutland lies within Central Denmark Region and Region of Southern Denmark.

The local police district: Southeast Jutlands Police, are headquartered in Horsens and covers the municipalities of: Skanderborg, Horsens, Hedensted, Vejle, Billund, Kolding and Fredericia.

== See also ==
- Trekantområdet
