= Steen Bostrup =

Danish journalist

Steen Bostrup (24 January 1939 in Horsens – 6 September 2006 in Copenhagen) was a Danish newscaster and journalist on TV Avisen for the Danish Broadcasting Corporation from 1964 to 2001.

== Biography ==
Steen Bostrup was born on 24 January 1939 in Horsens. He started his career as a journalist at Horsens Folkeblad in 1959, and soon after, he joined a local newspaper. In 1964, Bostrup got his first job at Danmarks Radio as a freelancer journalist. In 1996, he received a DR's Sprogpris award. He also was appointed a Knight of the Order of the Dannebrog in 1999. He died of a cardiac arrest on 6 September 2006.
