= Vilhelm Kyhn =

Danish artist (1819–1903)

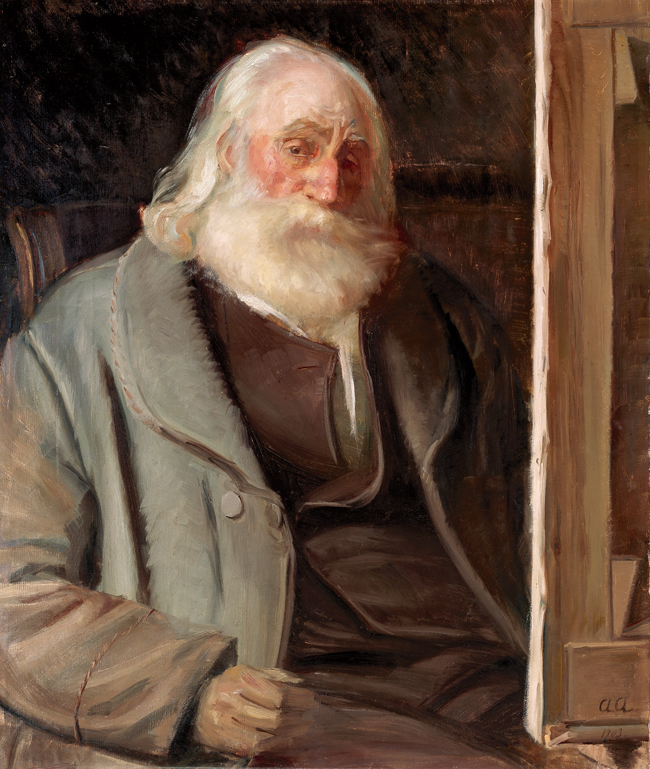
- Vilhelm Kyhn portrayed by his pupil Anna Ancher shortly before his death in 1903
- Born: March 30, 1819; Copenhagen
- Died: May 11, 1903 (aged 84); Frederiksberg
- Education: Royal Danish Academy of Fine Arts
- Known for: Painting
- Movement: Danish Golden Age

Peter Vilhelm Carl Kyhn (March 30, 1819 – May 11, 1903) was a Danish landscape painter who belonged to the generation of national romantic painters immediately after the Danish Golden Age and before the Modern Breakthrough. Even though he outlived many of his artistic peers by several decades, he remained a traditionalist and expressed strong criticism of many of the new trends in the painting of his day.

Kyhn also played a role as an educator, establishing several alternative art schools, including a painting school for women which was attended by Anna Ancher, among others.

== Biography ==
=== Early life and education ===
Kyhn was born in Copenhagen to Carl Gottlieb Kyhn and his wife Sara Marie. His father was against his becoming an artist, and he was first put to train in a business office; then as a compromise he was allowed to train with copperplate engraver, Georg Hoffmann. Here he learned to make vignettes, a skill which became useful to him later when he learned to make etchings.

He also got the opportunity to begin his training at the Royal Danish Academy of Fine Arts in 1836. He entered the School of Plaster Model Painting in 1840, and into the School of Model Painting in 1841, where he was influenced by the classicism of teacher Christoffer Wilhelm Eckersberg, father of the Golden Age of Danish Painting, and J. L. Lund. He was also influenced by Niels Lauritz Høyen, another teacher at the Academy as well as an important art critic and art historian, who encouraged a unique Danish school of art. N. F. S. Grundtvig was also a source of inspiration in his turn towards national romanticism.

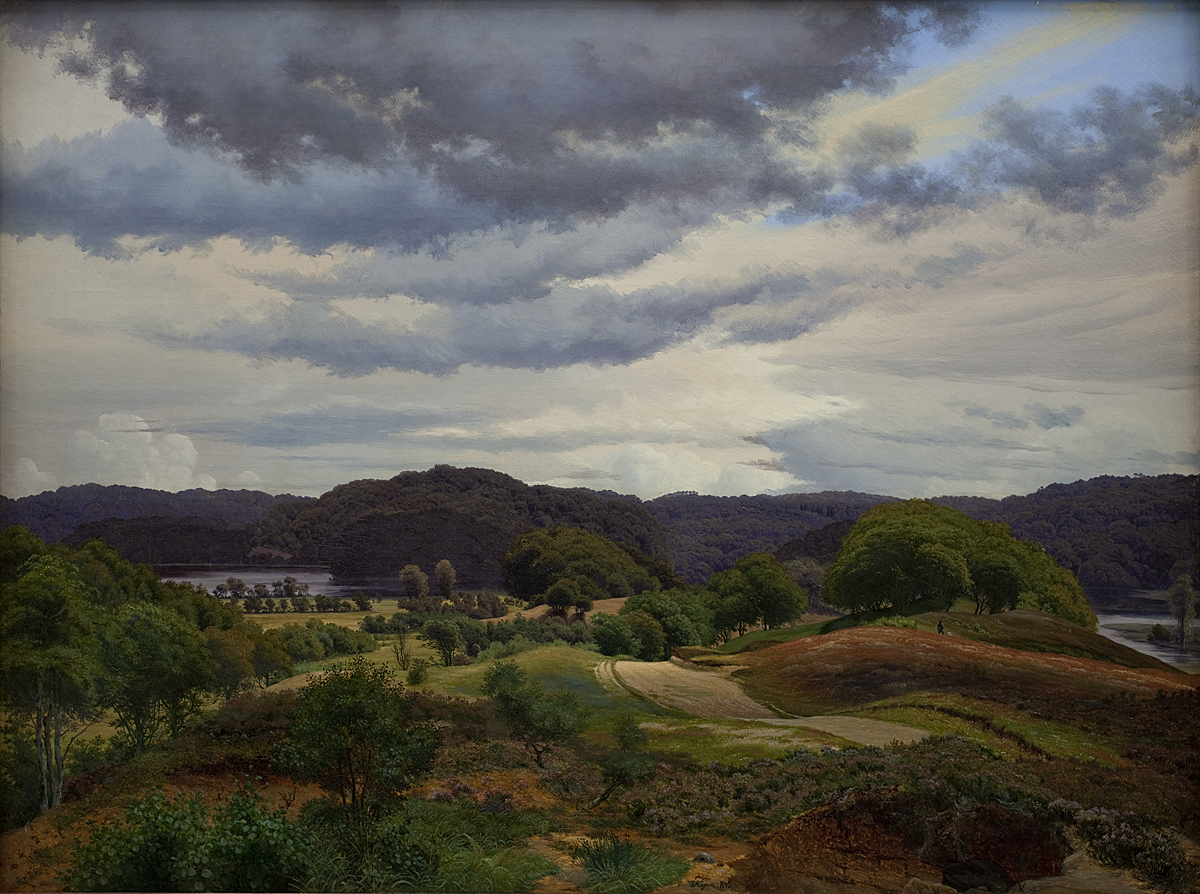
Jutland woodlands, painted by Kyhn in 1845 near Silkeborg and exhibited at Charlottenborg in 1845

He won the small silver medallion in 1843 for a figure drawing, but he was set on becoming a landscape painter. At about this time Danish landscapes started to become a serious domain for Danish artists. Kyhn became part of the movement and was able to exhibit his first landscape, Et bornholmsk Strandparti (A View of the Beach on Bornholm), an area he had visited over a period of several years. This painting was purchased by the Danish Royal Painting Collection, now the Danish National Gallery, and later loaned to Aarhus Art Museum.

In 1845, Kyhn won a prize in the Neuhausen Competition (Neuhausenske Konkurs) for Landskab, hvori Foraaret karakteriseres (Spring Landscape).

=== Student travel abroad ===
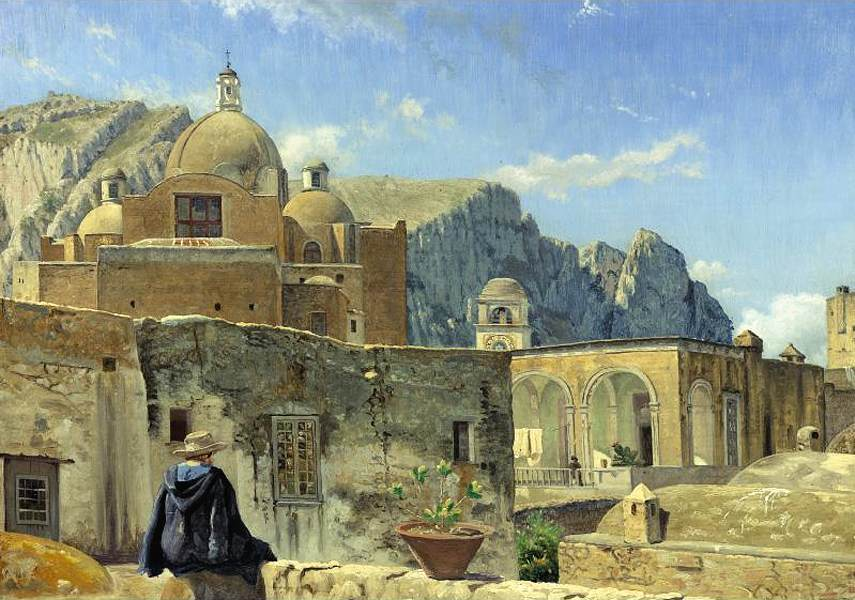
Young Boy Seated on a Wall Overlooking Capri, one of Kyhn's relatively few paintings from his travels

After a few years of diligent work painting landscapes in Jutland and the north of Zealand, he began to seek out a travel stipend; he was awarded one in 1848. However, he delayed his travels until the spring of 1850 on account of the turbulent times around the European revolutions of 1848 which led to Denmark’s becoming a constitutional monarchy on June 5, 1849.

He traveled over the Netherlands and Belgium to Paris in the spring of 1850, and reached Italy in September of the same year. The following year he received an extension to his stipend. He painted few landscapes of the countries he visited, and only during his travels abroad.

=== National romantic landscape painting ===
Back in Denmark in June 1851, he returned to painting direct studies from nature. The paintings which Niels Lauritz Høyen bought from Kyhn show good development in his style. His landscape painting ability continued to improve over the years, as exemplified by the winter scene, Kystparti ved Taarbæk (View of the Coast near Taarbæk) and Udsigt over det flade Land ved Bjærgelide (View across the Flat Land near Bjærgelide) painted in 1858, which featured the typical Danish countryside near Horsens. The flat prairies of Jutland in this picture were not a popular subject at the time. He helped open the way for other artists to interpret this quintessential Danish landscape.

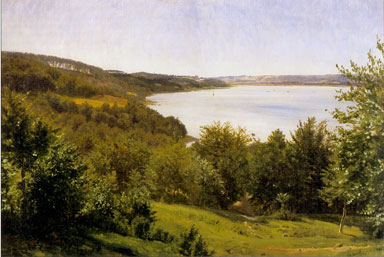
View over Vejle Fjord, 1854

After 1863, he painted many scenes in the special light of Denmark’s late summer evenings. These include the atmospheric Efter solnedgang i udkanten af en landsby (After Sunset on the Outskirts of a Village) painted in 1863 and Sildig Sommeraften ved Himmelbjærget (Late Summer Evening near Himmelbjerget) painted in 1874. Both of these paintings are in the collection of the National Museum of Art.

He painted many landscapes in the area near Silkeborg, and spent his summers starting in 1873 at Himmelbjerg, one of Denmark’s highest points. It was likely in this area that Kyhn began to experiment with painting in the open air, instead of painting in the studio as he had done previously and was customary.

== Graphic work ==
He was one of the driving forces behind the establishment of The Danish Etchers Union (Den danske Radeerforening) in 1853. He married Pauline Petrine Leisner on September 11 of that same year.

== Opposition to internationalism and conflicts at the Academy ==
He taught at both the School of Drawing and the School of Painting from the 1850s. He became a member of the Art Academy in 1870. He was a member of the Exhibition Committee at Charlottenborg 1873-1888, and of the Exhibition Committee for the World Exhibition in Paris 1877-1878. He traveled to Sweden in 1866 and 1874, to Norway in 1873 and 1874, to Skagen in 1877.

As a nationalist artist, the "blond artists" as they were called, he was excluded from membership in the Academy, and could not sell his paintings to the influential Kunstforeningen at Gammel Strand.

In reaction and opposition to the growing internationalism affecting young Danish artists who were choosing to travel to France as part of their education, and to the effect of this French training on Danish art, Kyhn sent a work to Paris in 1876. The work was a defense of Danish national art and the Eckersberg school of painting. He traveled to Paris in 1878 where his work was exhibited at the World Exhibition. He resigned from the Academy in 1882 in protest against works by Peder Severin Krøyer and Theodor Philipsen.

His work was exhibited at the first international art exhibition in Vienna, Austria in 1882. Kyhn was selected as member of the Academy’s plenary assembly in 1887.

== Alternative painting schools ==
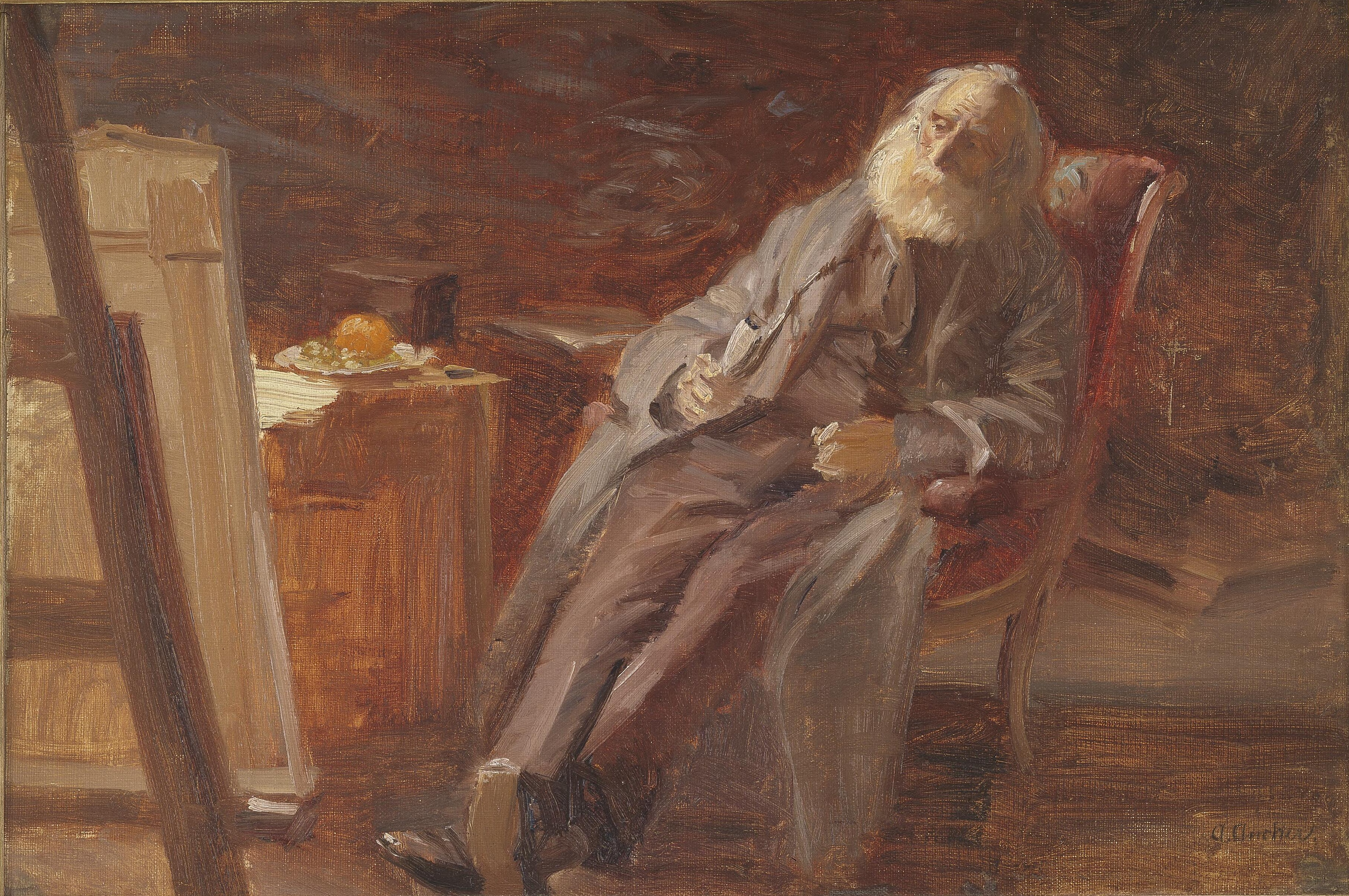
The Painter Vilhelm Kyhn Smoking his Pipe, painting by Anna Ancher, his best-known student from the Painting School for Women

During the period 1871-1879, Kyhn’s studio became a gathering place for a group of young, dissatisfied artists and Academy students called the Huleakademiet (The Den Academy), which eventually led to the formation in 1882 of The Artists' Independent Studio Schools (Kunstnernes Frie Studieskoler).

During this period, between 1865 and 1895, he also operated the Painting School for Women (Tegneskolen for Kvinder), at a time when women did not have access to the academy. More than 75 women trained under him, including Anna Ancher, Ville Bang, Johanne Krebs, Emilie Mundt, Marie Luplau, Emmy Thornam, Elise Konstantin-Hansen, Nicoline Tuxen, and Margrethe Backer Welhaven.

== Private life ==
His son Svend Carl, born in 1862, was a promising landscape and interiors painter but died in 1890. His wife died in 1894. He received the bronze medallion at the Paris Exhibition of 1900. He died in Frederiksberg on May 11, 1903, at the age of 84.

== The fruits of a long life ==
Kyhn maintained a freshness of perspective. He portrayed a more naturalistic landscape than previously, one that was anchored in careful study and with an immediacy made possible through open-air painting. He chose to feature and glorify the landscapes of his native land, exploring especially the countryside near his home in Jutland. He was influenced by the times, and could show that influence in his paintings, while the national romanticism of his middle years was still an anchor in his large production of landscapes. He influenced many younger artists.

He is featured in a portrait by Peder Severin Krøyer (1898).

Other Danish landscape painters of his generation were Johan Thomas Lundbye and P.C. Skovgaard.

== See also ==
Art of Denmark
