= Daviess County Rotary Jail and Sheriff's Residence =

- U.S. National Register of Historic Places
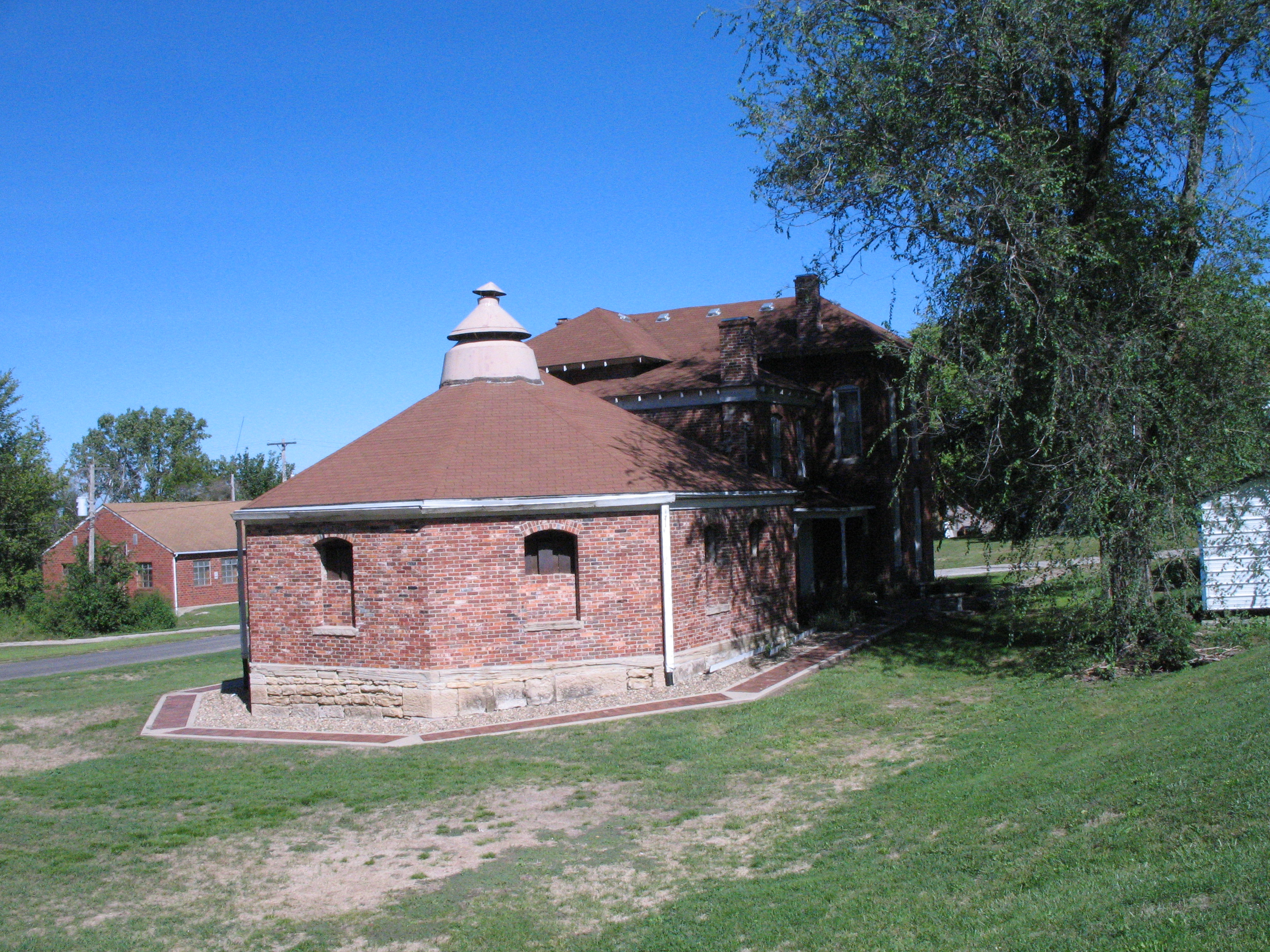
- Daviess County Rotary Jail and Sheriff's Residence, September 2007

- Location within Missouri Location within the United States
- Location: 310 W. Jackson, Gallatin, Missouri
- Coordinates: 39°54′55″N 93°57′50″W
- Area: less than one acre
- Built: 1888
- Architect: Pauly Jail Building & Manufacturing
- Architectural style: Octagon Mode
- NRHP reference No.: 90000131
- Added to NRHP: February 23, 1990

Daviess County Rotary Jail and Sheriff's Residence is a historic rotary jail and sheriffs residence located in Gallatin, Daviess County, Missouri. It was built in 1888 by the Pauly Jail Building and Manufacturing Company of St. Louis, Missouri. The jail is a one-story, octagonally-shaped brick structure on a stone foundation. The sheriff's residence is a two-story, T-shaped brick dwelling. It is connected to the jail by a two-story, irregularly-shaped structure which houses the jail's kitchen at the first floor level and the women's cells at the second-story level.

It was listed on the National Register of Historic Places in 1990.
