= Los Placeres =

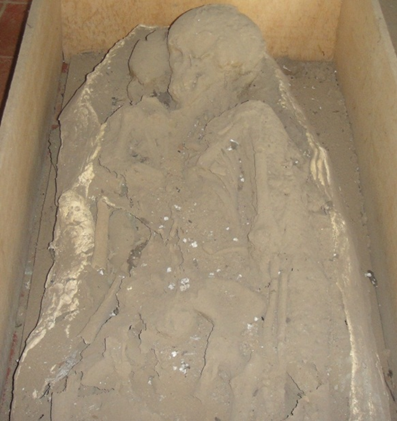
Placeres Double Burial. Remains of a child buried together with possibly the mother.

Los Placeres is an archeological site located between the “Waspán” and “Tabacalera Nicaragüense” neighborhoods at kilometer 4 1/2 of the “Carretera Norte”, in Managua, en Nicaragua. The site extends to the coast of Lake Managua. A large part of the area that delimits the site is being impacted by a new urban settlement known as Barrio Hugo Chávez, which divides the site, where its new settlers have disturbed the ground for installation of pipes for drinking water, toilet and housing, this activity has caused a serious incidental findings and impacts to the prehispanic archaeological site.

The Sector where the largest concentration of material evidence is on the surface is where excavations and archaeological research was made, mainly in the place that still preserves prehispanic mounds or architectural structures which probably corresponded to domestic or ceremonial areas.

This material is part of the document "Los Placeres, a scientific interest archaeological site.

== Archaeological investigation background ==
Due to the internal complexity this site has drawn interest and attention and is catalogued as object of scientific importance and research by the characteristics of its environment, and archaeological evidence observed; a group of archaeologists led by Dr. Frederick Lange in the 1980s (Lange, 1983, Sheets 1983) carried out an inventory and recognition of interest sites in the Pacific area of Nicaragua with the purpose of determining different settlement patterns within the Great Nicoya Sub-Cultural area, this prospection included Los Placeres, finding the presence of multiple chronological periods of occupation 500-800 CE, 800-1350 CE and 1350-1530 CE., and main structures and spatial distribution of potential settlements that inhabited the banks of the Lake and its regional connection by means of the lake.

Dominican Victor Holguín conducted two surveys, the results do not offer much interpretation of cultural material due to lack of knowledge and its classification system (Holguín: 1983). Ten years later, archaeologist Ronaldo Salgado conducted a survey and surface recollection determining that site was probably occupied from 500 to 1500 CE, which coincides with the material analysis of the controlled excavations performed by Stauber in 1996. (Stauber: 1996)

Therefore, it is suggested that apart from this site together with other registered by population impact by the Archaeology Department of the National Museum (Pichardo: 1996), (García: 1996) (Espinoza: 1996) (Zambrana: 1996) located on the shores of Lake Managua that used aquatic and land resources and fertile land for deployment in this area.

It is possible that biological characteristics determined and influenced the way of life, work and ceremonial and funerary practices in prehispanic Managua, and late period at the time of contact (Oviedo: 1976), in his descriptions he mentions a town very prosperous and a beautiful and populous square. (Gonzalo Fernández de Oviedo y Valdés, 1976: 3 376–377).

For several years after the eighties, natural disasters, water floods, agriculture, erosion, grazing livestock, robberies, lack of budgets and human resources of the cultural institution, destined for archaeological research has minimized research in the area, even with the existence of potential areas considered part of the archaeological reserve of one of the sites with a great information potential, of native people who lived on the shores of Lake Managua. (Stauber: 1996).

By 1996 within the Managua Metropolitan Zone archaeological research project (Lange: et al. 1996) (Stauber: 1996) (Pichardo: 1996) during his second season performed investigation, prospecting and excavation as it was considered a site of great scientific and ethno historical interest, where results determined it to be a multiple components site, represented by different occupation periods, Bagaces (300-800 CE), Sapoa (800-1350 CE), Ometepe (1350-1550 CE) and foreign contacts according to diagnosed pottery, also found a variety of domestic residues represented by the different ceramic types (Stauber: 1996) and lithic stone artifacts for hunting, fishing, grinding, also the location and distribution of several mounds where quantity and density of surface archaeological material is evident; where it is possible to affirm that there was a large population concentration.

During these excavations (Stauber: 1996) as result of the analysis of the material, concluded with emphasis on regional trade with groups of the central part and the Pacific through the lake, a possible social stratified organization, with emphasis on local organization.

What has not yet been reported on any field report and material analysis, of the aforementioned in the Los Placeres archaeological history (Stauber: 1996) is the evidence of burial areas.

It is necessary to systematically extend research and with scientific rigor with the purpose of defining burial spaces and obtain data related to prehispanic burial patterns on the site.

The population has impacted many secondary burials in Sacasa striated type urns (Bonilla et al. 1990), with small offerings pots, in different Managua settlements; mainly located on banks of Lake Managua, and other burial findings found in neighboring sites, as in Barrio Domitilla Lugo, El Rodeo (Pichardo: 1996), Las Torres (Garcia, Vázquez: 1996), and the San Cristobal site (Weiss: 1983).

It is likely that each hamlet or native settlement demarcated its burial area, because it is a decisive element to define social stratification by its funerary trousseau and the spatial distribution of the site and the village.

At the site Las Torres (Garcia: 1996) close to the lake shore, an important funeral pattern was found, scientifically recorded during archaeological investigations to develop in the area of the Metropolitan area of Managua and could determine a social stratification and form of collective burials or family based on spatial distribution and funerary trousseau.

The materials studied by Stauber within the second archaeological research season in the Metropolitan Zone (1996) the percentage of classified and scanned material, reported a strong presence and percentage of Sacasa striated type (Bonilla et al. 1990: 227) and suggests that perhaps had utilitarian and household use.

Within the main Sacasa ceramics burials, frequently over 50% of excavated materials depicted specific uses and utilitarian purposes represented in dishes called tecomates, ollas with enlarged outward edge, and outside of the utilitarian function, Sacasa seems to have had significance as burial pottery. (Bonilla: 228) represented in the funerary urns, boot or shoe shaped.

== Prehispanic Funerary Urns ==
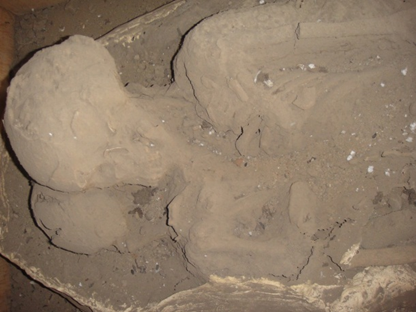
Placeres Double Burial. Detail of remains of child and mother.

During urbanization work and activities near a House, 4 prehispanic funeral urns were found, one of them large was placed in the center with a circular lid possibly Sacasa Striated type (800 BC-1350 DC, Bonilla et al. 227). Lack of current population awareness and the interest by the belief that it contained treasures; artifacts were completely destroyed and altered the context and archaeological record. Lack of prevention and supervision causes that each day more sites are destroyed and therefore the archaeological information.

All recovered parts were inventoried and taken to the restoration and laboratory of the Anthropology Department of the National Museum for their proper restoration, conservation and study by archaeologists.

Most urns and the skeletal remains are completely fragmented making it almost impossible to determine its context and spatial distribution; it is not possible to determine sex or age of the individuals.

In general, and according to burials characteristics found in the Pacific area and the coast of Lake Managua (Garcia: 1996) it is a funerary component possibly of one or two individuals due to the amount of Sacasa Striated type urns shoe shaped, also possibly associated with Papagayo ceramic polychrome fragments (800-1350 DC).

Other ceramic types associated with children burials is Las Brisas (not yet dated) where a funerary burial was found and the Sitio del Ferrocarril site in the city of Managua (Zambrana: 1996). Also at the laboratory are two shoe shaped miniature Sacasa Striated vessels associated with the funeral component where it is supposed that these had remnants of food or fish bone (García: 1999).

An archaeological recovery was made by a trench 6 x 4 meters long and width respectively, the excavation was abandoned for more than 15 days, were objects and human remains were displayed of the prehispanic inhabitants of the site.

Excavation had reached a depth of approximately 35 to 40 centimeters depth at the time it was abandoned.

Each of the funerary urns was coded using numbers 1 to 8, then surface cleaning was made and proceeded to excavate around before lifting, it must be clarified that most of these burials were already completely excavated and suffered vandalism. The maximum burial depth approximately ranges from 75 to 80 centimeters, only the oblong funeral urns were seated on the geological stratum known as Talpetate.

== The Site ==
Current residents have built latrines and in most archeological remains have been found; vegetation consists of fruit trees, bananas, and ornamental plants in the houses. Soils are sedimentary; clay with very fine light brown sand residues, the fertile stratum ranges between 30 and 40 centimeters in thickness in succession appears the Talpetate stratum.

== Spatial Burial Distribution ==
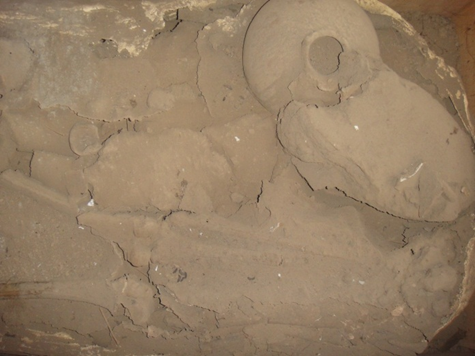
Placeres Double Burial. Offerings detail at the foot of the human remains, turtle shell (?), pottery round jar and ceramics.

Interpretation made about this burials area is that they seem to be distributed in the following manner and its description is made according to their north–south location: there are four red slip oblong-shaped funerary pottery urns of type known as Sacasa Striated located in north, south, east and west positions as if representing the four cardinal points.

Burial 1: It is a secondary funeral urn burial, 60 centimeters in diameter which was discovered by the west side of the trench, was superficially fragmented and contents at the top disturbed, was aligned with burials 2, 8, and 3, which correspond to urns shoes shaped burials.

Burials 2, 8 & 3: Were located in the center of the excavation between the urn 1 located on the west side, these are medium urns shoe shaped of the Sacasa Striated ceramic type, they were aligned with the tip east to west, the urn on the east side of the excavation was destroyed, as well as primary burial which corresponded to the human bones of an individual with the skull oriented to the west, the specimen was buried with extended hands facing where the sun rises. Anthropological biometric and cultural context data that could have been retrieved from these human bones was lost due to its total destruction.

Burial 4: By the southwest side of the excavation associated with funerary urn 7, oblong shape urn 4) shoe-shaped was found, the tip in position west, aligned with urns 1 and 6; while cleaning it human remains were found that correspond to lower limbs of an adult specimen, the bone remnants were found at the west of the urn.

Burial 5: It was located exactly at the center of Northern excavation profile and refers to a funeral urn, it is the only one that did not suffer disturbance except for the vessel which served as cover of the same; it was on a straight line from urns 7 & 8 and oriented north to south.

Burial 6: Between funeral urns burial 1 and 7, next to the southwest corner of the excavation found burial 6, which consists of an oblong ceramic Sacas Striated type and with a Murillo neck vessel applied which functioned as the urn lid, this urn type was the only one that had a different pottery type, is possible that the use of this type of ceramic mark a cultural burials differentiation, the medium shoe-shaped urns belong to infant burials and there is only one child buried in a medium oblong urn Sacasa Striated type, that was also disturbed.

Burial 7: It is an oblong ceramic Sacasa Striated vessel, located at the south and associated with burials 4 and 8 and in a straight line with funerary urn number 5. Only the burial mold was found where it was deposited on the Talpetate stratum, disappeared from the excavation and the whereabouts of prehispanic object is unknown, also lost is the cultural information.

Burial 8: It is a medium prehispanic piece shoe shaped, only the mold impression was found, left on a clay layer, disappeared from the excavation and cultural information was lost.

About these cultural vestiges two possibilities are inferred; the first is that it is related to a primary burial, disturbed or altered at the excavation time and second that the human remains were placed alongside the urn as funerary offerings. At the top of the ground of the dirt that contained this urn the mold or footprint where the small vessel was located that probably was the funeral offering of an infant. This burial was also disturbed and stolen.

All objects used in the burial ceremony were oblong and shape shoe ceramic Sacasa Striated Urn type and only one distinguished by having a lid made from ceramic Murillo neck applied type.

It must be established that all burials were disturbed and stolen and that the prehispanic objects corresponding to burials 7-8 and the urn 6) lid disappeared and their whereabouts is unknown. Funeral burial or urn number 9 which was associated with the bones of a direct burial by this sector of the trench was completely destroyed by the person that performed the excavation.

== Laboratory Work ==
In relation to the ceramic, it can be asserted that only three types of ceramics are reported: Sacasa Striated, Murillo neck applied, some Papagayo polychrome ceramic pots, there were basalt and chalcedony lithic chips.

Funerary urns were transferred to the laboratory with part of their archaeological contents were burials urns 1, 2, 3, 4, 5 and 6.

== Osteology Analysis ==
Analysis conducted on the archaeological evidence found in each of the urns provided the following data: Urn 1: diameter of 60 x 55 cm width and height respectively, found at between 30 and 40 cm depth relative to the edge of the urn begun appearing the first bone fragments.

The first anatomical part discovered was part of the skull which was placed face-down, the ribs, shoulder, scapulae and phalanxes were associated with the humerus and ulna – left side radius on the left side of the head. Lower limb of the skeletal remains were on the right side of the skull, the femurs below and the tibia - fibulae above, the pelvis and vertebrae residues were below the skull.

According to the biological characteristics of the bone and based on teeth wear, the human remains seem to correspond to an adult female specimen, aged 30 to 35 years approximately.

Furthermore, there were deciduous teeth remains or milk molar, premolar, canine and incisive, which appear to approximately correspond to a 1 to 2 years old child. The conservation state of the long bones did not permit obtaining biometric data to infer about the height of the adult individual.

Inside two small vases were found, one oblong shaped, flat base and wide mouth (8 cm) short-necked measuring 8 x 11 cm in height and width, Sacasa Striated ceramic type. The second corresponds to a small vessel with socket base, short neck; red slip probably associated with the red Rivas ceramic, measured 9 x 10 cm, height and width, and the mouth diameter is 5.2 cm.

These vessels are considered funerary offerings that relatives or family deposited with their dead at the time of the burial ceremony. Surely human remains deposited in this urn belonged to the mother and her baby, a collective family burial in a zone of burials.

URN 2: Corresponds to a prehispanic piece shoe shaped with the following dimensions: Length 40, width 28, height 31 and mouth diameter 21.5 cm, was recovered completely fragmented and altered, at the bottom of the urn were found remains of temporary dental or deciduous molars, premolars, canine and incisors that seem to correspond to an infant aged 6 to 8 years approximately.

URN 3: This artifact is similar to the previous one and has the same dimensions, inside a chalcedony chip was found, 2 of flint stone, and one of basalt. In the cleaning process animal remains were collected corresponding to fish vertebrae, amphibians, and evidence of vegetal remains and wildlife with combustion evidence (coal).

Human remains consist of very small residues including temporary dental parts or milk teeth: Molars 3, premolars 2, the four canines and 4 incisors. According to the biological characteristics of teeth roughly appear to belong to a child aged 12 to 18 months.

Mixed with the children remains 92 elaborate necklace beads made from clay cylindrical shape were found, round shape decorated in brown and black, they probably formed a small baby necklace that was possibly worn around his neck as a body adornment.

From these burials is the only reported with this type of offering, in addition to lithic residues and fauna remains; this evidence probably constitutes the child funerary dress that could be considered as a cultural differentiation element with regard to the "social status" of the individual.

Associated with this urn skeletal remains were discovered that seem to correspond to an adult specimen and was directly deposited on soil or direct burial. The human bones of this burial were destroyed by some local children who threw stones and subsequently the skeleton was destroyed completely by the person that commenced the excavation, this action against cultural property was completely vandalism.

URN 4: This was located by the south end near the southwest corner of the excavation; it is a medium-sized urn equal to the previous and the same ceramic type. While being rescued it was found in the same fragmented state and stolen.

At the laboratory remains of human bones were found inside, which corresponds to a child. Probably the infant relatives deposited a small vase as offering, the dirt containing the urn still had the mold of the small vessel that was extracted and stolen by vandals.

While retrieving the remains human remains were found at the west side of the urn, it is inferred this was a primary burial, probably disrupted, and probably buried with the body pointing south to north; the human remains seem to correspond to fragments of an adult lower limb, gender and age undetermined.

URN 5: It is an oblong Sacasa Striated ceramic type with dimensions of 60 X 60 cm in height and diameter respectively, its mouth measures 30 cm long and was located in the center of the northern excavation.

This funeral burial is possibly the least damaged because it was only partially unearthed; only the urn upper part and the lid vessel were damaged by predators.

To extract this urn its content was partially excavated "in situ", then packaged and carefully moved to the laboratory. Using the same methodology that was used in the cleaning of the previous urns allowed us to obtain the following information:

Excavation was made in small layers and at about 20 – 25 cm depth relative to the edge of the urn began to appear the first human skeletal remains, then discovered a skull, which was carefully cleaned discovering it had been placed face down, vertebrae, sternum, ribs, and shoulder were on both sides the head, skull was oriented towards the east.

Among the human remains, the following dental pieces were discovered: lateral superior incisive left, and right and the central, two central lower incisive, canine superior left and right and bottom right, M1, M2, lower rights M3, M1, M2, M3 left inferior, left upper M3, Pm1, higher rights Pm2, Pm1, upper left Pm2, Pm1, lower rights Pm2, Pm1, left Pm2 lower.

Well-formed cusps are seen in all the molars, there is no enamel attrition, and teeth wear is in acceptable condition what indicate that these belong to a young person.

On the basis of morphological burials as the mastoid process, the jaw, wears and biological characteristics of their teeth it is inferred that these belong to a young female specimen, aged 18 to 21 years approximately.

Pathology: Only the M2 showed decay evidence (spots), and low concentration of tartar dental cement in most teeth.

Below the woman skull, in sequence were found, cranial bones that according to their anatomical characteristics and biological seem to correspond to a male specimen, who was placed face-down oriented north; seems to be that the lower extremities of both individuals were package deposited in east–west direction and upper extremities north–south. Clavicles, vertebrae, ribs, etc. were found on both sides of the head, as well as the woman.

Among the unearthed human remains were: A fragment of the left jaw branch that preserves dental pieces M1 and M2, a fragment of the jaw left side which preserves in its anatomical position dental pieces Pm1 Pm2, M1, M2 is observed that wear is homogeneous in all the molars.

Among dental disarticulated pieces the following were discovered: right upper lateral incisor, a lower left canine, lower molars M2 left and right, the premolars Pm1, superior Pm2 left and right, 5 dental pieces, not possible to determine their anatomical position due to its conservation state.

The exception is in M2, presents a much more marked wear, it is likely that this type of tooth abrasion was due to the individual using his teeth as a tool. According to the biological characteristics of the skull, jaws, long bones and tooth wear leads to conclude that these belong to a mature male adult of about 30 to 35 years of age.

Associated with the previously described human remains is a right jaw branch piece which preserves its molar temporary M1 anatomical position (or milk) with much wear and the premolar Pm2 still in the alveolar orifice in the process of emergency.

A fragment of the left jaw that retains in anatomical position premolars Pm1 and Pm2 as deciduous teeth and is observed in the alveoli molar M1 permanent in emergency process. On the basis of this data, it is inferred that the skeletal remains could correspond to an infant aged 10 to 12 years approximately.

Pathology: Observed decay evidence in molars and tartar concentration in most teeth, did not observe any sort of disease in the long bones caused by pathological problems.

URN 6: It is an oblong medium funerary urn with the following dimensions: diameter 43 cm, height 35, mouth measuring 25 cm. The urn was located south of urn number 1.

On the West side of the urn, human remains were found possibly part of a femur oriented north–south, it is likely that this was a direct burial that was disturbed at the time of depositing the urn.

Among the human remains are present remains of a skull, a temporary molar, and remains of the upper and lower limbs. The remains suggest that it is a child of about 7 to 9 years of age. Bone fragments have a poor conservation status.

URNS 7 & 8: Correspond to a child and adult burials, were extracted and stolen, unknown destinations, information was supplied by the residents of the place.

Funeral Burial 9 & 10: Corresponded to a large urn, similar to 5 and a primary funeral urn, the remains seemed to be an adult specimen; the skeletal remains were destroyed and trampled by Jorge Espinoza. This is considered as a vandalism act to the archaeological and cultural assets of the nation, these cases of destruction of predation should be disclosed to society.

== Funerary Practices in Prehispanic Managua ==
Funeral patterns practiced by prehispanic native settlers of Managua, interesting information is available, as is the case of archaeological records of burials with funerary trousseau that set or marked social stratification.

The presence of a main burial is a sign of social stratification. The use of artifacts and green stones are burials establishing the difference. As a rule, offerings characteristics are better indicators of social rank when they can be associated with personal data of the deceased, such as age and gender. E.g., a case of range acquired by kinship, unlike that achieved by merit, would be represented in the tomb of a teenage individual buried with authority and opulence symbols.

The status distinctions have proved to be more difficult to determine that the ranks, especially in archaeological context for which there is no ethno historic or ethnographic direct analogy. This is the case when horizontal affiliation markers are perishable and survive as archaeological evidence; decorations painted on bodies, clothing, or hairstyles. (Garcia in Lange: 1996: 115).

These types of secondary burials in funerary Urns seem to be the most common forms of the ceremony of burials; but in recent years that applied analysis on human bones unearthed some urns from different sites in the metropolitan area of Managua and the country found skeletal remains belong to 2 or 3 dismembered individuals, deposited in a same Urn.

Osteological analysis leads to infer that these were real families or that have a kinship as in the case of the urn number 5, a man, a woman and infant human remains were found had no clothes, probably related to common society members that were buried in a collective burial or a mound.

Burials, often in a mound, were practiced in all parts of Nicaragua, and almost in the entire Nicoya peninsula. In Guacas and Las Casitas, Hartman (1907ª, p. 15), could not determine the profile of hole where the body was placed, due to the special nature of the soil. These sites, and certainly in many others, prevailed secondary funeral, and body bones were piled around the skull. (Lothrop. V-I page 93) down.

== Sacasa Striated Ceramic, Cultural Aspects ==
All urns and vessels belonging to the type, with the exception of a small red slip bowl, belongs to funerary offerings.

The main burials diagnostic is that areas not covered with grooves or brush are made after cooking. Decoration is based on live forms, especially animal shapes and strips are applied and grooved. Finally, a number of such urns are shoe shaped.

On the surface finish, the pots are observed scrapped inside and inside show brush, and stripes on the outside, while the earthenware display brushing on the inside surface and have a polished red slip.

The most frequently represented animals are rodents, bats, peccaries and growling jaguars. Strips frequently applied with grooves, are disposed in spiral or long circles. Other models were used to depict rough eyes, eyebrows and other facial features, as well, round knots, buttons etc.

The grooves are dominant decoration, however, they seem to have been made with strong, bristle brush, to scrape smooth surface without slip before cooking. The grooves tend to run horizontally around the vessel. Often groove markings in different directions, suggesting that the brushing technique was to completely cover the urn, modeling quickly and with meticulous care.

It seems that this ceramic had many uses, in addition to its domestic function. A good number of funerary urns of this kind were found by Bransford (1881), lacking edge, suggesting that these could be removed while placing the body of the deceased inside, showing that these vessels were not always designed to be used as urns. (Lothrop, 1926: 254).

This ceramic type marks a break with early traditions. It became the most important and common household type from the Apompua phase until the Spanish conquest (Haberland, 1986; 1992).

Bransford (1881) found Sacasa Striated accompanied by earthenware Luna Polychrome, indicating the contemporaneity of both types (Garcia in Lange, 1996: 117).

== Bibliography ==
1994 - Espinoza, E. R. Gonzalez, y D. Rigat, Gran Nicoya y la Cuenca del Lago de Managua. Vínculos 18/19: 157- 172.

1992 - Lange F.W., PD. Sheets, A, Martínez t S. Abel- Vidor . The Archaeology of Pacific Nicaragua. University of New. México Press, Alburquerque.

1995 - Zambrana J., y R. García V. Rescate de entierros secundarios en urns funerarias en los sitios N- MA- 24 Las Brisas; N-MA-35 El Ferrocarril. En Descubriendo Las Huellas de Nuestros Antepasados. El proyecto “Arqueología de la Zona Metropolitana de Managua “. Alcaldía de Managua. Managua.

1995 - Zambrana - Descripción del nuevo tipo cerámico Las Brisas Impreso. En descubriendo Las Huellas de Nuestros Antepasados. El Proyecto “Arqueología de la Zona Metropolitana de Managua” pp. 153–154. Alcaldía de Managua. Managua.

1996 - García, Ramiro Hallazgo Arqueológico en el Barrio Las Torres, Managua un possible cementerio con enterramiento múltiples. En Abundante Cooperación Vecinal. La segunda Temporada del proyecto Arqueología de la Zona Metropolitana de Managua.” pág. 105.

1996 - Stauber Excavaciones arqueológicas e investigaciones preliminares en el Sitio Los Placeres (N- MA-1). En abundante cooperación Vecinal. La Segunda Temporada del proyecto Arqueología de la Zona Metropolitana de Managua”.

1881 - Bransford, J.F. Institución Smithsonian, “Nicaragua Archaeological Investigations”, Washington D.C. 1881. Judd & Detweiler.
