= Museum of Traditions and Legends =

Museum in León, Nicaragua

Coordinates: 12.43204°N 86.87886°W

El Museo de Tradiciones y Leyendas
- Location: León, Nicaragua
- Type: Museum of Traditions and Legends
- Collection size: Nicaraguan traditions and legends, puppet illustration, prison history

El Museo de Tradiciones y Leyendas (English: the Museum of Traditions and Legends) is located in León, Nicaragua. The museum building was once the infamous XXI prison where, from 1921 to 1979, many prisoners were tortured. Today, the prison cells depict Nicaraguan traditions and legends through puppet illustration, while wall paintings portray how tortured prisoners suffered.

The museum charges an admission fee. A Spanish guided tour is available.

== See also ==
- List of museums in Nicaragua
