= Rotary jail =

Prison design

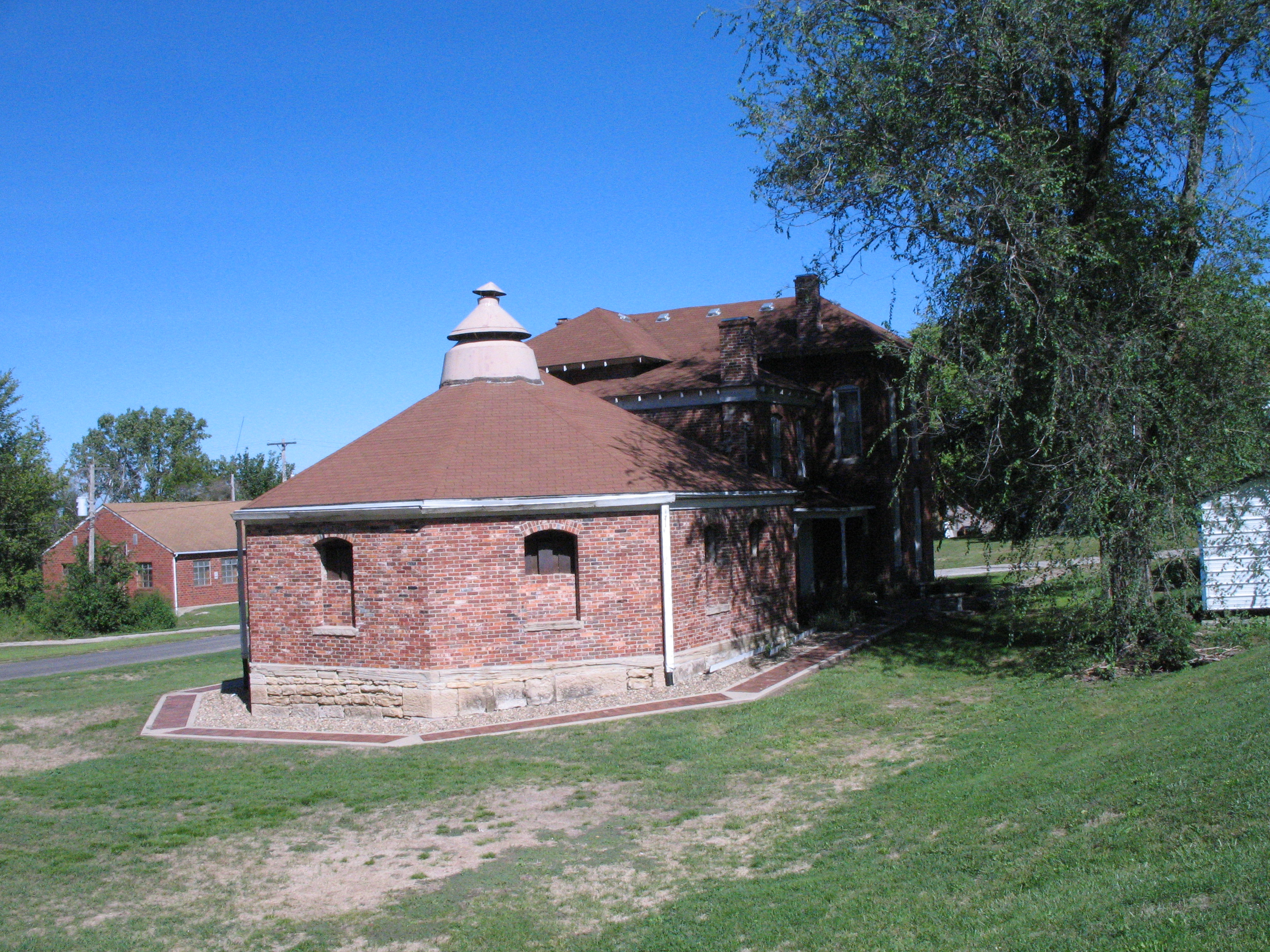
Daviess County Rotary Jail in Gallatin, Missouri

A rotary jail is an architectural design that was used for some prisons in the Midwestern United States during the late 19th century. Cells in the jails were wedges on a platform that rotated in a carousel fashion. The surrounding of the entire level had a single opening, allowing only one cell at a time to be accessible. Estimates of the number built range from seven to 18.

== Design and patent ==
The rotary jail was initially designed by architect William H. Brown, and built by the Haugh, Ketcham & Co. iron foundry in the Indianapolis, Indiana neighborhood of Haughville. Their July 1881 patent had the following description:

The object of our inventions is to produce a jail in which prisoners can be controlled without the necessity of personal contact between them and the jailer or guard ... it consists, first, of a circular cell structure of considerable size (inside the usual prison building) divided into several cells capable of being rotated, surrounded by a grating in close proximity thereto, which has only such number of openings (usually one) as is necessary for the convenient handling of prisoners.

Detail diagram of central core plumbing connections to cell.

The pie-shaped cells rotated around a core having a sanitary plumbing system, which was considered an unusual luxury at that time. The cell block could be rotated by a single man hand-rotating a crank. It was connected to gears beneath the structure which rotated the entire cell block. The structure was supported by a ball bearing surface to allow for smooth rotation.

== Condemned ==
The jails encountered problems almost immediately. Inmates' limbs were crushed or interfered with the cellblock's rotation. Most of the jails had to be welded in a fixed position and refitted with individual cell accesses after only a few years. All except one were condemned by June 22, 1939. The Pottawattamie County Jail in Council Bluffs, Iowa, remained in use until December 1969. The rotary mechanism was disabled as late as 1960, following an incident where an inmate died of natural causes but the body could not be retrieved for two days due to a malfunction in the mechanism.

The last rotary jail with an operating rotary mechanism in existence is the Montgomery County Jail in Crawfordsville, Indiana. As per the original design, the jail could handle 16 prisoners and the third floor contained three cells for ill inmates to keep them separate from the remainder of the population. This jail had its rotary mechanism disabled around the late 1930s and the structure was condemned in 1967 and closed fully as a jail in 1973.

== Locations ==
Sources vary as to how many rotary jails had been built. One source reports that 17 rotary jails were contracted for construction but only 12 were completed, while others say 17 or 18 were actually built (based on jail-construction company records) while another claims as few as seven were built.

=== Extant ===
- Montgomery County Jail and Sheriff's Residence, Crawfordsville, Montgomery County, Indiana – listed on the National Register of Historic Places in 1975 and as a National Historic Landmark in 2023.
  - This is the only one where the rotary mechanism still operates. It opened in 1882 and housed prisoners for over half a century. Two years after the jail was closed in 1973, the Montgomery County Cultural Foundation turned it into the Old Jail Museum. Its rotary mechanism, which had been welded shut, was unwelded around 1975 so that the jail could rotate again. A 1985 bequest from one of its founders enabled the foundation to renovate the structure. Work on the rotary cell block was completed in 1996. The former sheriff's home is used by the local community to house receptions and workshops.
- Pottawattamie County Jail, Council Bluffs, Pottawattamie County, Iowa – listed on the National Register of Historic Places in 1972 and as a National Historic Landmark in 2023.
  - Used until 1969, rotary mechanism unused after 1961.
- Daviess County Rotary Jail and Sheriff's Residence, Gallatin, Daviess County, Missouri – listed on the National Register of Historic Places in 1990.

=== Demolished ===
- Maryville, Nodaway County, Missouri
- Paducah, McCracken County, Kentucky—uncertain if actually constructed
- Maysville, DeKalb County, Missouri
- Pueblo, Pueblo County, Colorado
- Appleton, Outagamie County, Wisconsin—uncertain if completed
- Charleston, Kanawha County, West Virginia
- Rapid City, Pennington, South Dakota
- Burlington, Vermont
- Sherman, Grayson County, Texas
- Oswego, New York
- Waxahachie, Texas
- Wichita, Kansas
- Williamsport, Indiana
- Dover, New Hampshire
- Salt Lake City, Salt Lake County, Utah

== See also ==
- Revolving restaurant
