= Pottawattamie County Jail =

Historic jail in Council Bluffs, Iowa, US

- Squirrel Cage Jail; Pottawattamie County Jail
- U.S. National Register of Historic Places
- U.S. National Historic Landmark
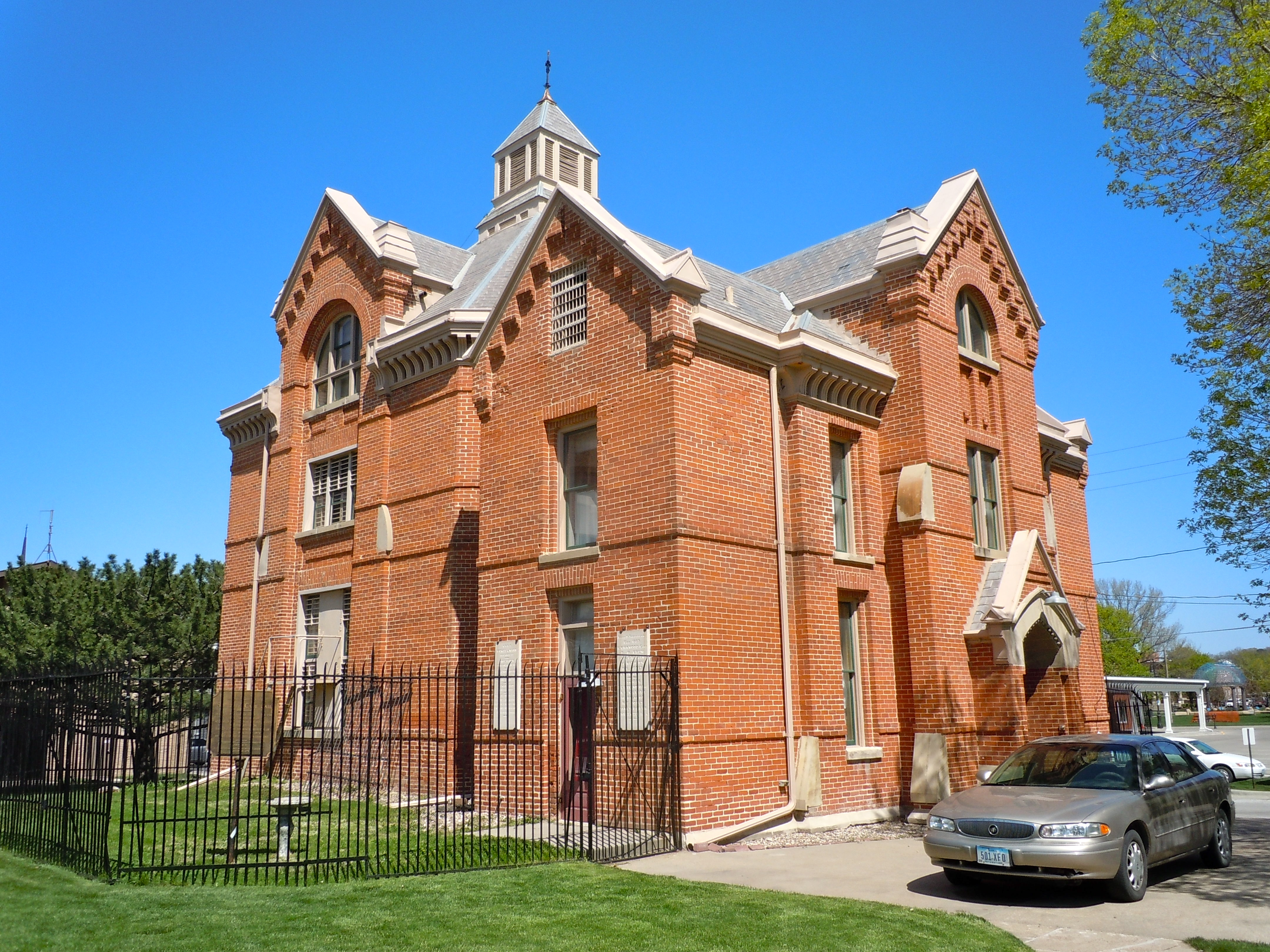

- Location within Iowa Location within the United States
- Location: 226 Pearl St. Council Bluffs, Iowa
- Coordinates: 41°16′35″N 95°50′39″W
- Built: 1885
- NRHP reference No.: 72000481 (NRHP listing), 100009825 (NHL designation)

Significant dates
- Added to NRHP: March 16, 1972
- Designated NHL: December 11, 2023

The Pottawattamie County Jail, also known as Squirrel Cage Jail in Council Bluffs, Iowa, United States, was built in 1885 and it was listed on the National Register of Historic Places in 1972. The building is one of three extant "squirrel cage jails", also known as rotary jails. It was designated a National Historic Landmark in 2023.

== History ==
Construction of the jail was simultaneous with that of the county's new courthouse, which was finished in 1888. It was designed by William H. Brown and Benjamin F. Haugh of Indianapolis, Indiana, at a cost of $30,000.

The building was one of 18 such jails that were built in the United States and the only one that was three stories tall. Also known as 'Squirrel Cage Jail', it was one of a handful of rotary jails built in the Midwestern America in the mid-19th century. The building was designed for maximum security with minimal contact between the prisoners and the jailers. The front part of the jail had offices for the jailer, a kitchen, trustee cells, and quarters for women. The rest of the building is made up of pie-shaped cells that revolved inside of a cage.

The building was used as a jail until its closure in 1969. In 1971, the Council Bluffs Park Board acquired the building for $5,000. In 1977, the county historical society took ownership of the building, maintaining it as a museum.

== In popular culture ==
=== Television ===
The Pottawattamie County Jail was featured as a haunted location in a special episode of Ghost Adventures in 2019 titled, "Serial Killer Spirits: Axe-Killer Jail" which aired on the Travel Channel.

=== Radio ===
The jail was also referenced in an old time radio program Gang Busters, in the episode Gang Busters – The Case of John K. Giles, which originally aired September 29, 1945. In the episode John K. Giles is reportedly captured and sent to the "Pottawattamie Prison", a special jail with impregnable bars and microphones in the wall. The escape artist fashioned a key out of a sharpened utensil and was able to unlock the cell door to get free.

== See also ==
- List of National Historic Landmarks in Iowa
- National Register of Historic Places listings in Pottawattamie County, Iowa
