= Horsens =

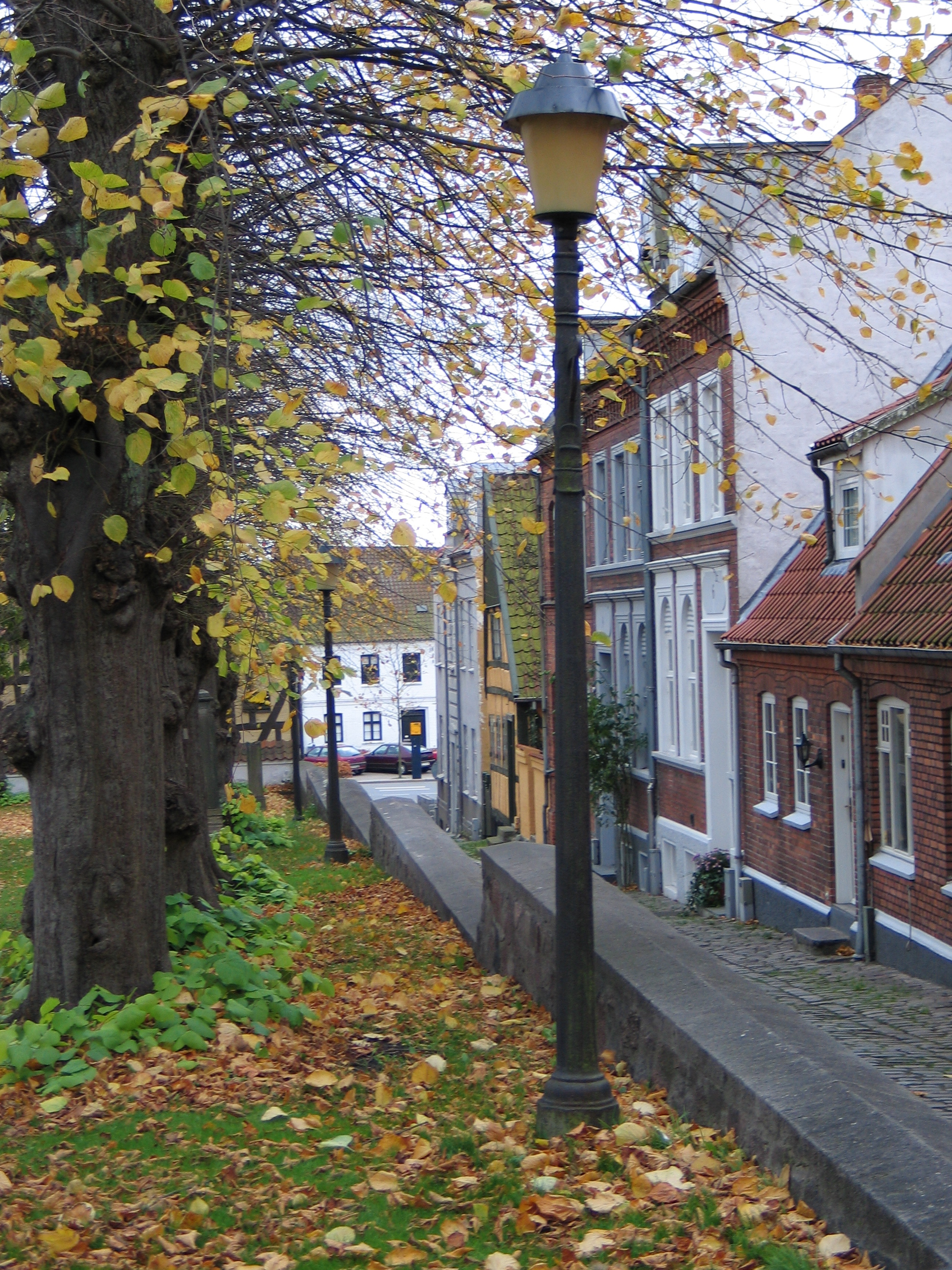
- Street in the old town

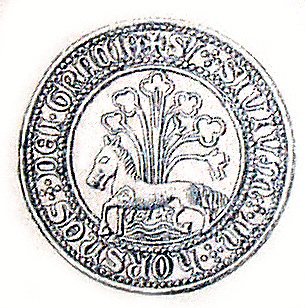
- Seal Coat of arms

- Location in Denmark Horsens (Central Denmark Region)
- Coordinates: 55°51′30″N 09°51′00″E
- Country: Denmark
- Region: Central Denmark
- Municipality: Horsens
- Founded: 12th century

Area
  - Urban: 29.8 km^{2} (11.5 sq mi)
- Elevation: 5 m (16 ft)

Population (1 January 2026)
  - Urban: 65,037
  - Urban density: 2,180/km^{2} (5,650/sq mi)
  - Gender: 32,672 males and 32,365 females
- Demonym: Horsensianer
- Postal code: DK-8700 Horsens
- Area code: (+45) 7
- Website: horsens.dk

Horsens (Danish pronunciation: [ˈhɒːsn̩s]) is a city on the southeast coast of the Jutland peninsula. It is the seat of the Horsens municipality. The city's population is 65,037 (1 January 2026) and the municipality's population is 98,806 (as of 1 January 2026), making it the 6th largest city in Denmark.

Horsens is best known for its culture and entertainment events. Horsens New Theatre is a cultural centre which holds over 200 events annually. It has managed to draw major names such as Madonna, One Direction, Paul McCartney and The Rolling Stones.

== Etymology ==
It is believed the name Horsens derives from the old Danish words hors (horse) and næs (naze, headland). The name Horsens has been in use since the 12th century.

== History ==
The earliest traces of a city are remains of a pagan burial site and houses dating back to the 9th century. In the 12th century, the kings Sweyn III and Valdemar I issued coins in the city. In the 13th century the city got its own legal code.

Excavations have shown that the city was expanded around 1300, with a moat going around the city and its harbour. Industrialization started from the middle of the 19th century. The population rose dramatically when people from the countryside moved to the city to work in the factories. The first Danish iron foundry outside of Copenhagen was opened as well as tobacco and textile factories.

In 1992, Horsens celebrated its 550th anniversary as a market town.

== Geography ==
Horsens lies at the end of Horsens Fjord in eastern Jutland. The city is surrounded by typical moraine landscape with low hills and valleys created by glaciers during the last ice ages. Horsens is 50 km (31 mi) south of Aarhus and 30 km (19 mi) north of Vejle, and approximately 200 km (120 mi) from Copenhagen.

== Economy ==
The city is currently undergoing a positive development with new industry moving to Horsens, or expanding their activities already in Horsens. A lot of electronics and graphical companies are based there. Horsens also has the only Industrial Museum in Denmark. The city is also home to VIA University College which brings a lot of international students to move to this town.

== Culture ==
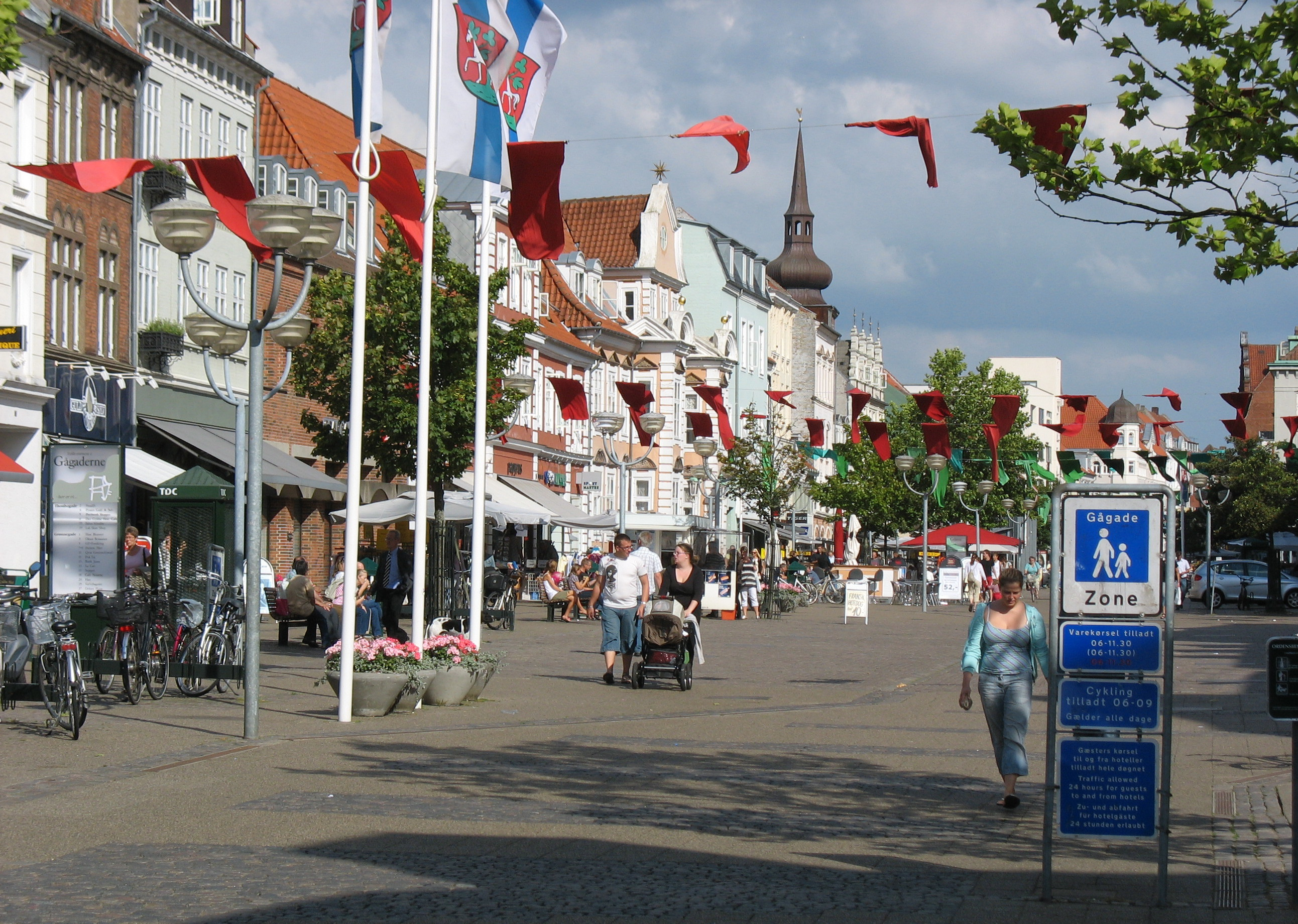
A pedestrian zone

In recent years, much effort has been made to expand and improve cultural events. Several internationally known artists, such as Madonna, Metallica, Iron Maiden, Joe Cocker, Elton John, The Beach Boys, Bob Dylan, Tom Jones, Bryan Adams, David Bowie, José Carreras, Helmut Lotti, Westlife, R.E.M., Paul McCartney, Robbie Williams, The Rolling Stones, Dolly Parton, AC/DC, U2, Rammstein and Snow Patrol have performed, or have performances planned in Horsens.

Metallica has performed several times in Horsens.

Hard Rock/Heavy Metal band Pretty Maids is from Horsens.

One of the largest cultural events in Denmark is the annual European Medieval Festival on the last Friday and Saturday in August. The town centre of Horsens is transformed into the largest medieval market town in Northern Europe with activities and entertainment for families and children of all ages.

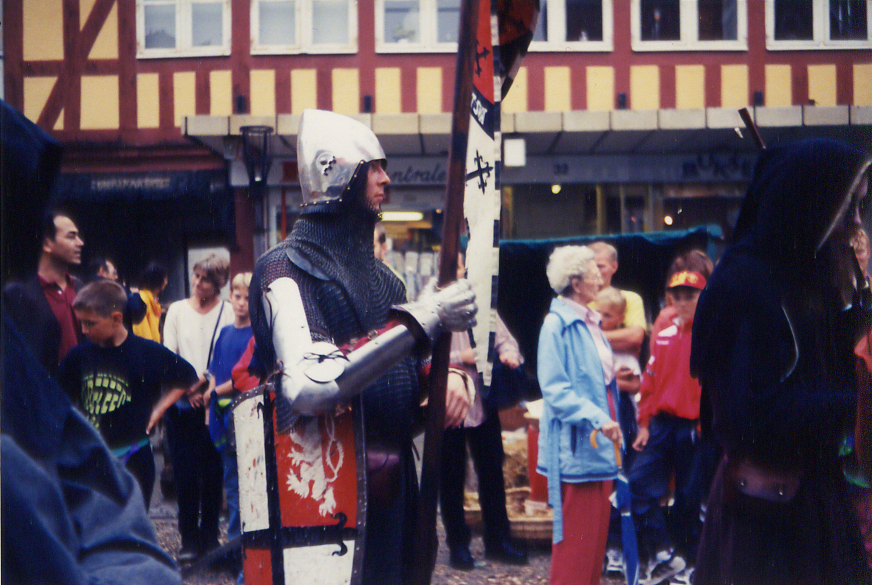
European Medieval Festival

Every March, Horsens hosts a Crime Fiction Festival. The Crime Festival – in Danish called Krimimessen – is an event for literary crime, mysteries and thrillers. The Crime Festival is organized by Horsens Public Library. Every year, many well-known crime writers visit Horsens.

The city is home to Horsens Industrimuseum, a museum showing the history of the industrial society. The museum shows technological development and developments in living conditions for workers.

Peter Sørensen from the Social Democrats is mayor of Horsens.

Vitus Bering, the famous Russian Navy captain, was born here.

Horsens also has a wide variety of street art, including Sculpture Alley, murals, and gable paintings.

== Education ==
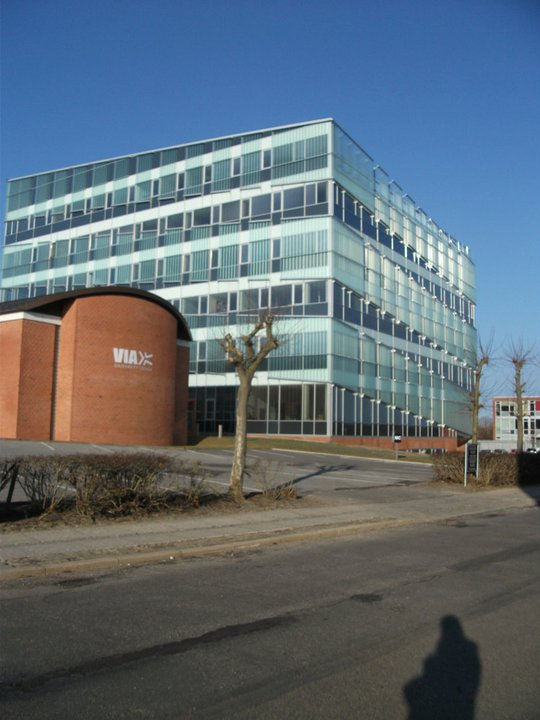
VIA University College

The largest educational institution in Horsens is VIA University College, which offers a wide range of engineering, technical and business programmes for Danish and International students. In the summer of 2020, VIA University College accepted 1066 new students. That was 2.1% more than the number of students that were accepted to the university the year before.

== Sport ==
Horsens is the home to professional football club AC Horsens who play in the Danish 1st Division. Their home ground is the 10,400 capacity CASA Arena Horsens.

From 2015 to 2018, the CASA Arena hosted motorcycle speedway, when it held the Speedway Grand Prix of Denmark, taking over as host from the Parken Stadium in Copenhagen, which had held the Speedway Grand Prix event from 2003 to 2014. Frederikslyst Speedway was another speedway venue located approximately 8 kilometres south west of the town, off the Frederikslystvej in the forest (55°48′47″N 9°43′23″E). It held the final of the Danish Individual Speedway Championship in 1995.

Horsens is also home to professional basketball team Horsens IC who play in Basketligaen. The team plays at Forum Horsens which has a capacity of 3,300. The team has won the league 6 times most recently in 2014–15 and 2015–16 as well as winning the Danish Men's Basketball Cup 3 times most recently in the 2014–15 season.

The local handball club HH Elite has played in the top division on several occations. In 2004 they won the Danish Women's Handball Cup.

== Transportation ==
=== Rail ===
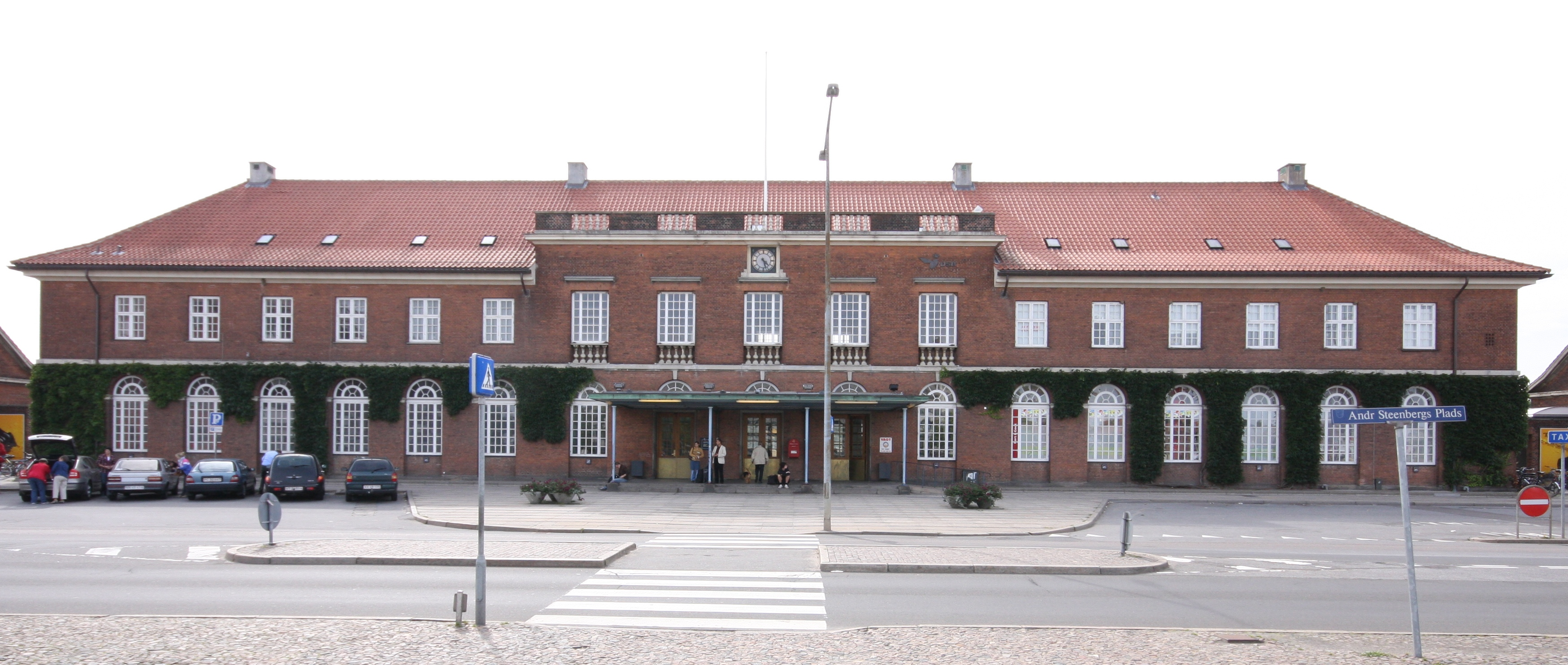
Front facade of Horsens railway station.

Horsens is served by Horsens railway station. It is located on the Fredericia–Aarhus railway line and offers direct InterCity services to Copenhagen, Hamburg, Aarhus and Aalborg as well as regional train services to Fredericia and Aarhus.

=== Road ===
European route E45 runs by the city of Horsens.

== Prison ==
From 1853 to 2006, the city housed the Horsens Statsfængsel prison, which held prisoners serving longer sentences. A notable prisoner was former minister of justice Peter Adler Alberti.

The last execution in peacetime in Denmark happened in the prison in 1892 when Jens Nielsen was decapitated in the courtyard.

Carl August Lorentzen was a safe cracker who became famous for his escape from the prison in 1949 when he dug a tunnel from his cell and out to freedom. When the guards discovered he was missing, they found a note from him with the words "Where there is a will there is a way". Lorentzen was captured a few days later on a nearby farm.

The old run-down buildings were not fit for a modern prison. In 2006 the prison was closed and the newly built State Prison of East Jutland was opened. The new prison, which is placed near Horsens, held the mass murderer Peter Lundin for a period.

Since its closure as a prison, Horsens Statsfængsel has housed a crime and prison museum, and conference and business facilities. The prison grounds have been used for concerts. It was considered as the venue of the Eurovision Song Contest 2014, along with two other cities in Denmark.

VisitHorsens (the local tourist office) moved to the Prison in 2013 and in 2015 a hotel called SleepIn has opened in the Prison.

== Notable people ==
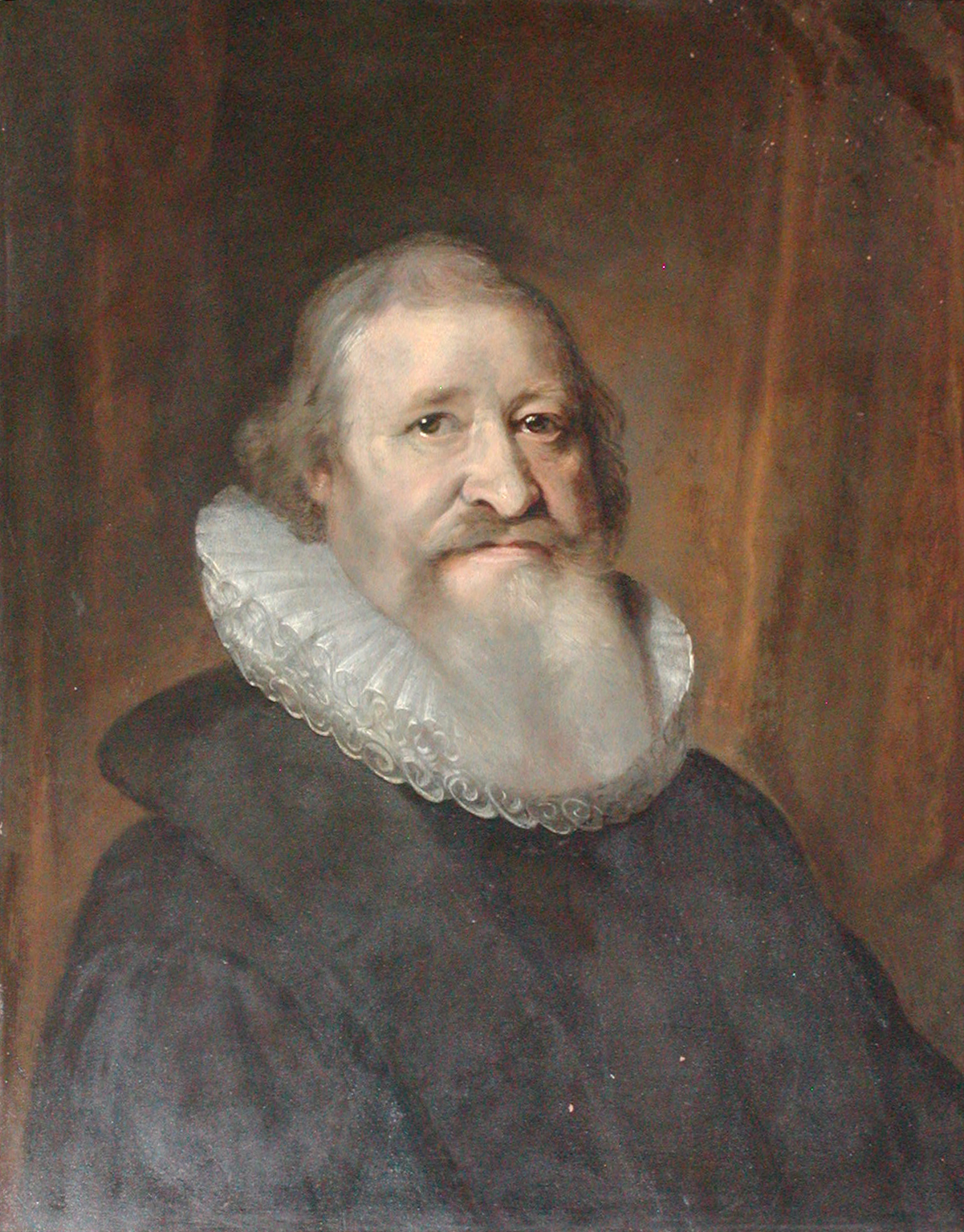
Hans Svane

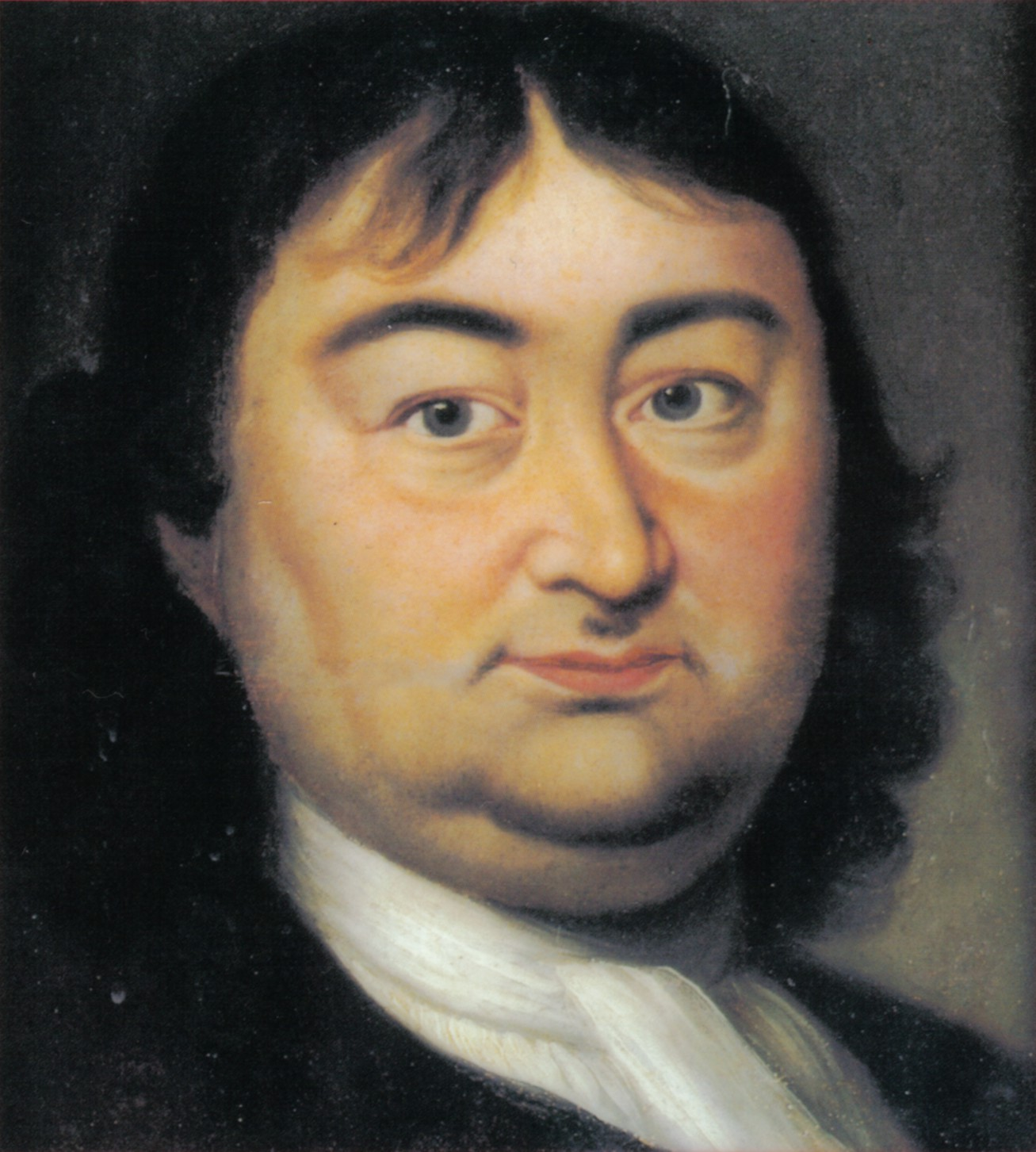
Vitus Bering

=== Public thinking and politics ===
- Peder Skram (ca.1500-1581) a Danish Admiral and naval hero.
- Jens Bang (ca.1575–1644) a wealthy Danish merchant, built Jens Bang's House in Aalborg
- Hans Svane (1606–1668) a Danish statesman and ecclesiastic.
- Vitus Bering (1681–1741), naval officer and explorer, the Bering Strait was named after him.
- Poul Vendelbo Løvenørn (1686–1740) a Danish military officer, diplomat and landowner
- Ove Høegh-Guldberg (1731–1808) statesman and de facto Prime Minister of Denmark
- Catherine Antonovna of Brunswick (1741–1807) & Elizabeth Antonovna of Brunswick (1743–1782) daughters of Duke Anthony Ulrich of Brunswick lived under house arrest in Horsens
- Adelbert Heinrich Graf von Baudissin (1820-1871), writer
- Hedevig Rosing (1827–1913), author, educator, school founder; first woman to teach in Copenhagen's public schools
- Andreas Bang-Haas (1846–1925) a Danish entomologist and insect dealer
- Hans G. Jensen (1856–1922) a Norwegian trade unionist, politician and tailor
- Ellen Broe (1900–1994) a Danish nurse who established educational and training initiatives
- Lilli Gyldenkilde (1936–2003) a Danish politician, a member of the Folketing and an MEP
- Lars Hedegaard (born 1942) a Danish historian, journalist and author
- Peter Landrock (born 1948) a Danish cryptographer and mathematician
- Jens Kehlet Nørskov (born 1952), professor
- Jan Trøjborg (1955–2012), politician, Mayor of Horsens 2005–2012, served in the Folketing 1987–2005, was Govt. Minister
- Jens Nielsen (born 1962), professor
- Anders Samuelsen (born 1967) a Danish politician and Minister of Foreign Affairs (Denmark)
- Peter Fibiger Bang (born 1973) a Danish comparative historian

=== The arts ===
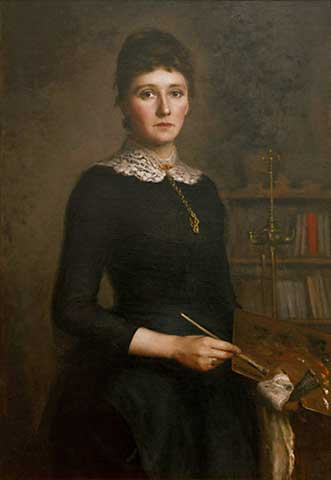
Ludovica Thornam, 1885

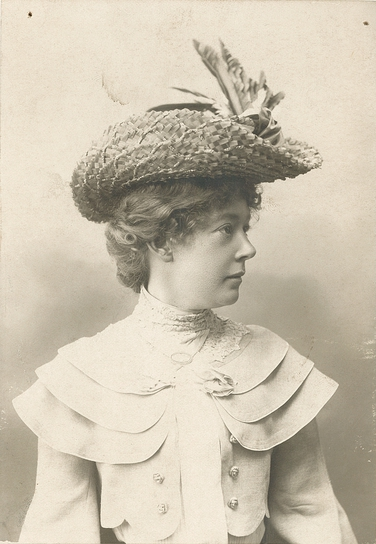
Anna Bloch, 1904

- Anton Dorph (1831–1914) a Danish painter who painted altarpieces and fishermen
- Frederikke Federspiel (1839–1913) first female pro photographer, ran a photo. studio in Aalborg
- Ludovica Thornam (1853–1896) a Danish portrait and genre painter
- Alfred Schmidt (1858–1938) a Danish illustrator, caricaturist and painter
- Anton Rosen (1859–1928) a Danish architect, furniture designer and decorative artist
- Albert Edvard Wang (1864-1930) a Danish landscape painter
- Anna Bloch (1868–1953) a Danish actress
- Steen Bostrup (1939–2006), journalist and radio broadcaster
- Emanuel Gregers (1881–1957) a Danish actor, screenwriter and film director
- Christian Arhoff (1893–1973) a Danish stage and film actor and member of National Socialist Workers' Party of Denmark
- Knud Holmboe (1902–1931) a Danish journalist, author and explorer
- Vagn Holmboe (1909–1996), a Danish composer and teacher who wrote in a neo-classical style
- Poul Borum (1934–1996) writer, poet and critic, was raised in Horsens
- Manon Rasmussen (born 1951) a Danish costume designer
- Kristian Halken (born 1955), film actor
- Søren Sætter-Lassen (born 1955) a Danish stage, film and television actor
- Michael Kvium (born 1955) a Danish multifaceted artist
- Anne Louise Hassing (born 1967), actress
- Emmy Thornam (1852–1935), flower painter and writer
- Ludovica Thornam (1853–1896), portrait and genre painter
- Barbara Zatler (1980-2019) an actress, TV personality, model and comedian
- Pretty Maids (formed 1981) a Danish hard rock/heavy metal band from Horsens
- Peter Bjørnskov (born 1981) a Danish singer, songwriter and record producer

=== Sport ===
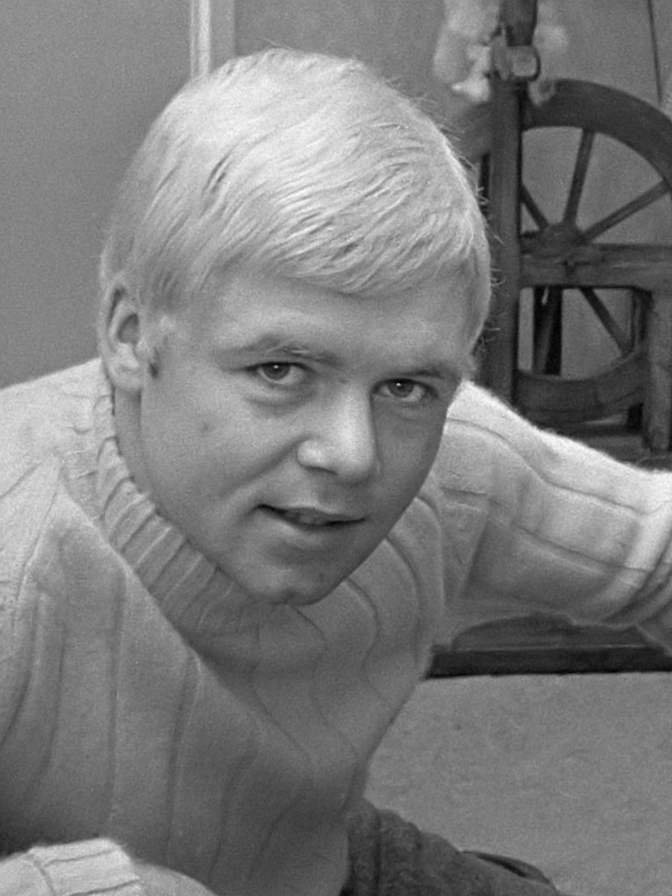
Bent Schmidt Hansen, 1969

- Ernst Schultz (1879 – drowned, 1906) sprinter, bronze medallist at the 1900 Summer Olympics
- Thyge Petersen (1902–1964) an amateur boxer, silver medallist at the 1924 Summer Olympics
- Helge Muxoll Schrøder (1924–2012) rower, team silver medallist at the 1948 Summer Olympics
- Bent Schmidt Hansen (1946–2013) a footballer, over 350 club caps and 8 for Denmark
- Anja Hansen (born 1973) handball player, team gold medallist at the 1996 Summer Olympics
- Anne Dot Eggers Nielsen (born 1975) a former footballer, won 118 caps for the Danish national women's team
- Søren Jochumsen (born 1976) a retired football goalkeeper, 521 caps with AC Horsens
- Brian Priske (born 1977) retired footballer, 468 club caps and 24 for Denmark
- Karen Brødsgaard (born 1978) a Danish former handball player, twice team gold medallist at the 2000 and 2004 Summer Olympics
- Simon Kjær (born 1989), footballer over 390 club caps and captain of Denmark with 95 caps
- Anne-Marie Rindom (born 1991) a Danish sailor, gold medallist at the 2020 Summer Olympics
- Alexandra Bøje (born 1999) a Danish badminton player
- Jeppe Kjær (born 2004) a Danish footballer who plays for Bodø/Glimt

== Twin towns – sister cities ==
Horsens is twinned with:

Blönduós, Iceland; Chengdu, China; Karlstad, Sweden	Moss, Norway; Nokia, Finland

== See also ==
- Chronicle of the Expulsion of the Grayfriars#Chapter 15 Concerning the Friary at Horsens
