= National Register of Historic Places listings in Rockdale County, Georgia =

Map of Georgia with Rockdale County highlighted

This is a list of properties and districts in Rockdale County, Georgia that are listed on the National Register of Historic Places (NRHP).

This National Park Service list is complete through NPS recent listings posted March 21, 2025.

== Current listings ==
	Name on the Register	Image	Date listed	Location	City or town	Description
1	Almand-O'Kelley-Walker House	Almand-O'Kelley-Walker House	February 2, 1998 (#97001647)	981 Green St. 33°39′50″N 84°00′56″W	Conyers	
2	Conyers Commercial Historic District	Conyers Commercial Historic District	May 24, 1988 (#88000581)	Roughly bounded by N. Main St., Warehouse St., GA RR, and Center St. 33°40′01″N 84°01′04″W	Conyers	
3	Conyers Residential Historic District	Conyers Residential Historic District	July 5, 1990 (#90000947)	NW of the central business district, roughly along Main St., Milstead Ave., and Railroad St. 33°40′15″N 84°01′13″W	Conyers	
4	Dial Mill	Dial Mill	April 6, 1978 (#78001005)	NE of Conyers off GA 138; 33°42′42″N 83°54′51″W	Conyers	
5	Fountain Hill		February 20, 2024 (#100009953)	Address Restricted	Conyers vicinity	
6	Aaron and Margaret Parker Jr. House	Aaron and Margaret Parker Jr. House	May 6, 2009 (#09000271)	4835 Flat Bridge Rd., SW. 33°37′54″N 84°08′43″W	Stockbridge	Now in the Panola Mountain State Preservation Park
7	Rockdale County Jail	Rockdale County Jail	August 26, 1982 (#82002462)	967 Milstead Ave. 33°40′07″N 84°01′00″W	Conyers	Now the Old Jail Museum
