= Heritage High School (Conyers, Georgia) =

Public secondary school in Conyers, Georgia, United States

Location
- 2400 Granade Road Southwest; Conyers, Rockdale, Georgia 30094-6299; United States; 33.627728°N 84.049045°W

Information
- Motto: "Setting the Stage for Excellence"
- Established: 1976
- School district: Rockdale County School District
- NCES District ID: 130441001591
- Principal: Joshua T. Pittman
- Teaching staff: 99.70 FTE
- Grades: 9-12
- Enrollment: 1,803 (2023–2024)
- Student to teacher ratio: 18.08
- Colors: Red and blue
- Athletics conference: 8-AAAAA
- Mascot: Patriot
- Nickname: HHS
- Team name: Patriots
- Accreditation: Southern Association of Colleges and Schools
- Newspaper: The Sentinel
- Yearbook: L'Espirit
- Website: hhs.rockdaleschools.org

Heritage High School is one of three public secondary schools in Rockdale County in Conyers, Georgia, United States (the others being Rockdale County High School and Salem High School), under the Rockdale County School District. Heritage High School is home of the Patriots. It has twice been named a School of Excellence. In December 2009, U.S. News & World Report gave Heritage High School a silver medal ranking in the top 500 high schools in the nation. In 2014 Heritage High School became an Academy for Performing and Visual Arts.

== Shooting ==
On May 20, 1999, a month after the Columbine High School massacre, 15-year-old student Anthony "T.J." Solomon opened fire with a sawed-off .22-caliber Browning BL-22 lever-action rifle on the Heritage campus, wounding six students. A 15-year-old girl was hospitalized in critical condition, and the other victims suffered non-life-threatening injuries. After emptying the 12 rounds that were inside the rifle, he ran outside, firing 3 times with his revolver as he did so. Outside, Solomon attempted suicide with a .357 Magnum revolver but was talked into surrendering by two assistant principals. At the time of the shooting, the PBS series Frontline was in Conyers filming a documentary about an STD outbreak that occurred among Conyers teenagers in 1996. Solomon initially faced up to 351 years of prison if convicted of aggravated assault and other charges, but in 2000 he was found guilty but mentally ill, and was sentenced to 40 years in prison and 65 years of probation. A judge later reduced his sentence from 40 to 20 years. He was released to his mother's house on parole on July 26, 2016.

== Performing Arts ==
In July 2014, Heritage High School became an Academy for Performing and Visual Arts, also referred to as the Fine Arts Program. Students accepted into the program are enrolled in one of the following majors:

- Vocal Music
- Instrumental Music
- Dance
- Theatre
- Technical Theatre
- Visual Arts

=== Theater ===
Heritage High School's drama department won the Georgia High School Association one act play competition at the 6A level in 2017 and 2018. Also in 2017, they won the Georgia High School Theater Award for Overall Production, for their production of Les Misérables.

== Notable alumni ==
- Tyler Austin, Yokohama DeNA Baystars, first baseman and outfielder
- Clint Mathis, World Cup soccer player
- Jack McBrayer, actor, singer, and comedian
- Jamie Newton, founder of Golf Turf Management; appeared on one season of Survivor
- Marcus Printup, Jazz Trumpeter and member of the Jazz at Lincoln Center Orchestra under the leadership of Wynton Marsalis.
- Richard T. Scott, artist, writer, and coin designer for the United States Mint.
