= Conyers Commercial Historic District =

Historic district in Georgia, United States

- U.S. National Register of Historic Places
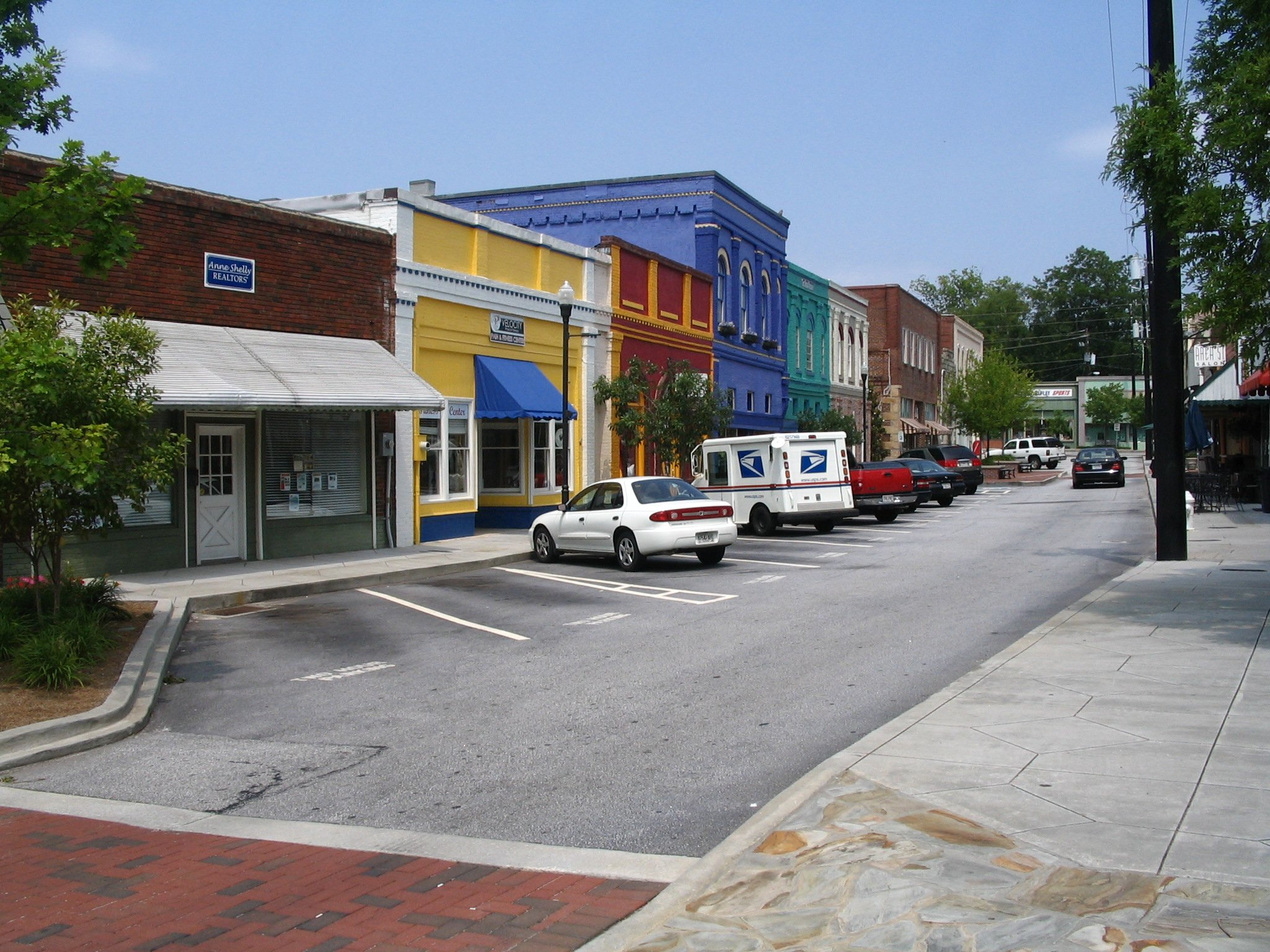

- Location within Georgia
- Location: Roughly bounded by N. Main St., Warehouse St., GA RR, and Center St., Conyers, Georgia
- Coordinates: 33°40′01″N 84°01′04″W
- Area: 6 acres (2.4 ha)
- Built: 1845
- Built by: Multiple
- Architect: Multiple
- Architectural style: Colonial Revival, Late Victorian
- NRHP reference No.: 88000581
- Added to NRHP: May 24, 1988

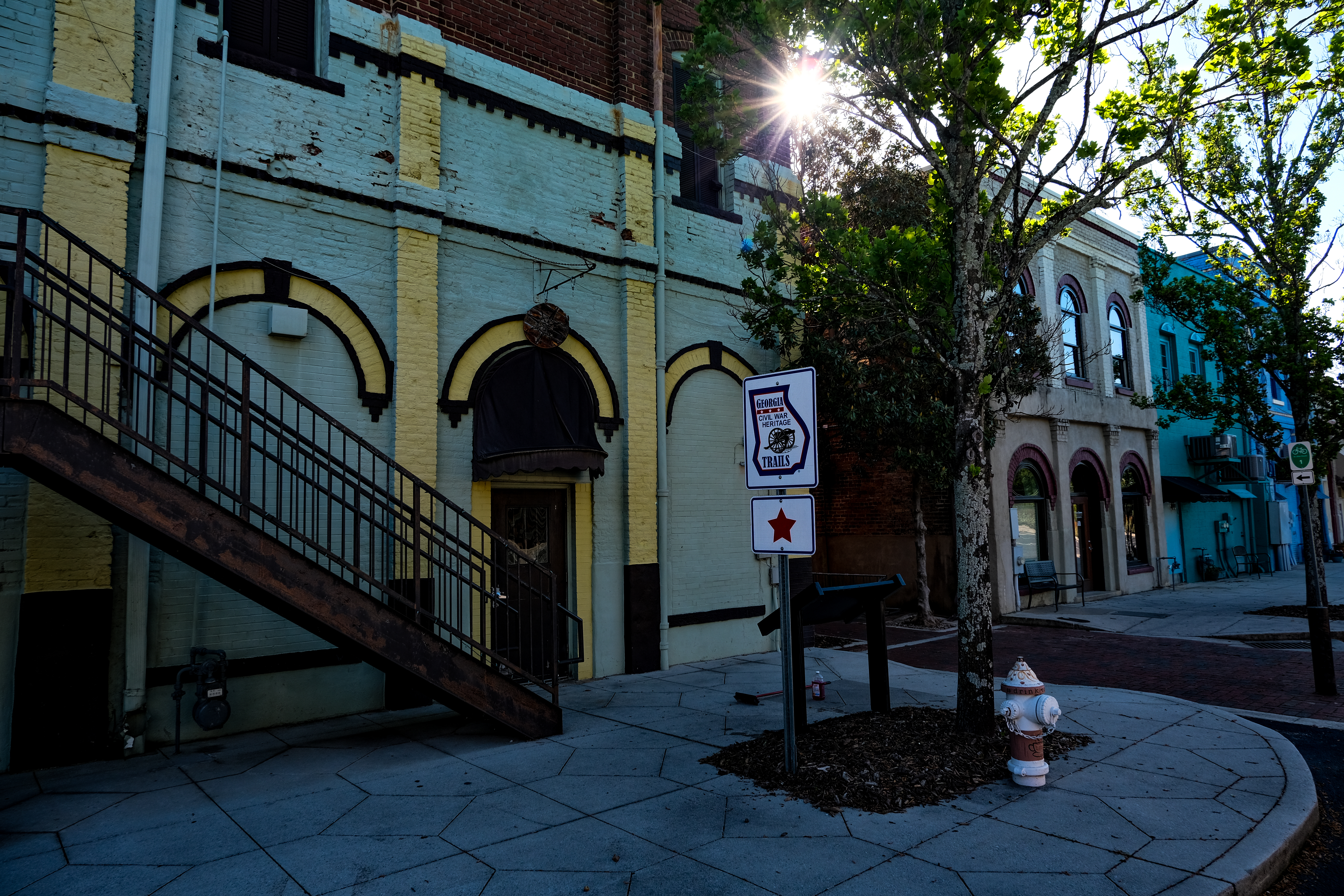
Conyers Commercial Historic District

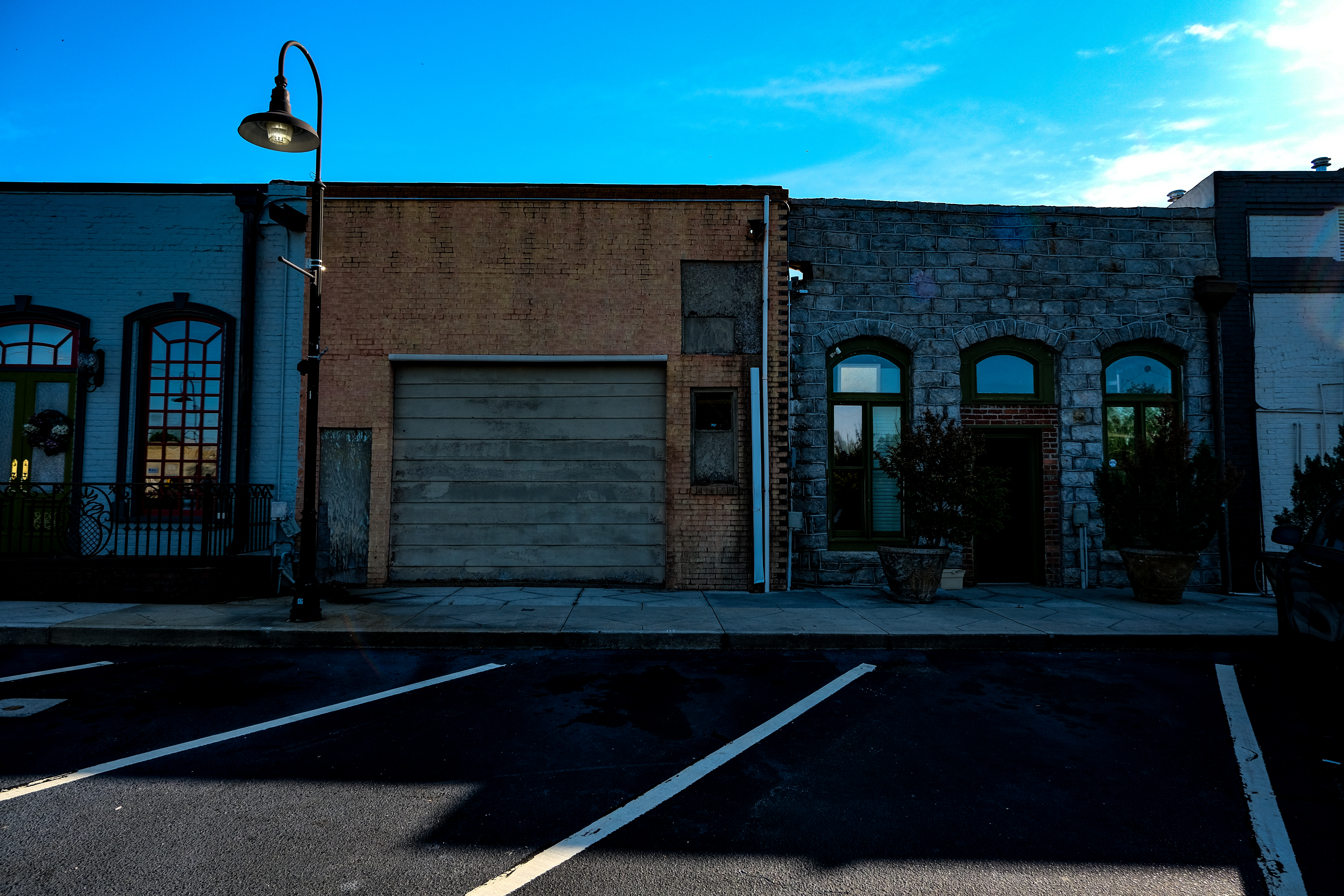
The buildings along Railroad St NW

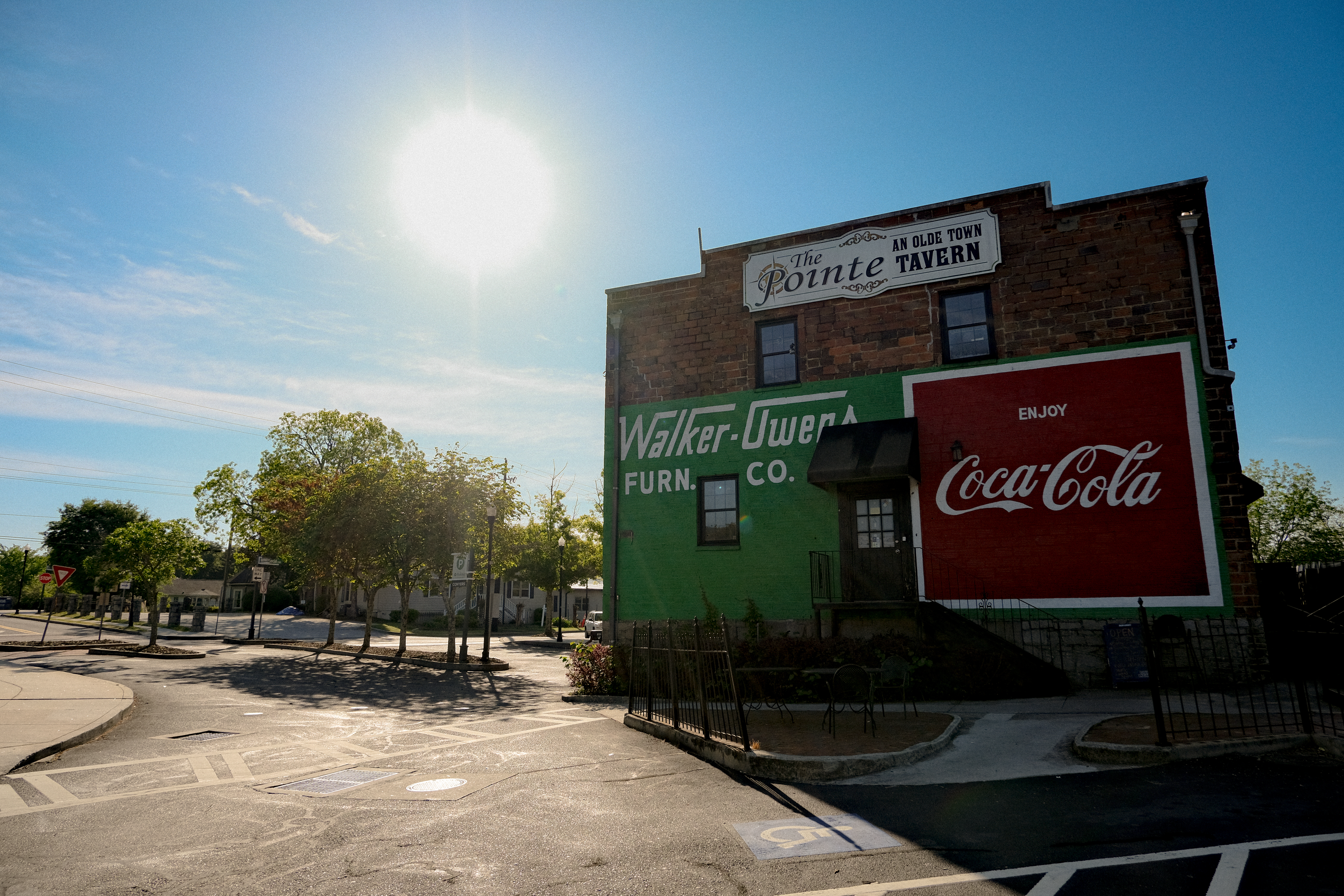
The Pointe - An olde town tavern where Railroad St and Commercial St meet.

The Conyers Commercial Historic District is a 6 acres (2.4 ha) in Conyers, Georgia which was listed on the National Register of Historic Places in 1988.

The district is roughly bounded by N. Main St., Warehouse St., GA RR, and Center St. It included 39 contributing buildings, a contributing structure and a contributing object.

== See also ==
- National Register of Historic Places listings in Rockdale County, Georgia
