= Tyler Austin =

American baseball player (born 1991)

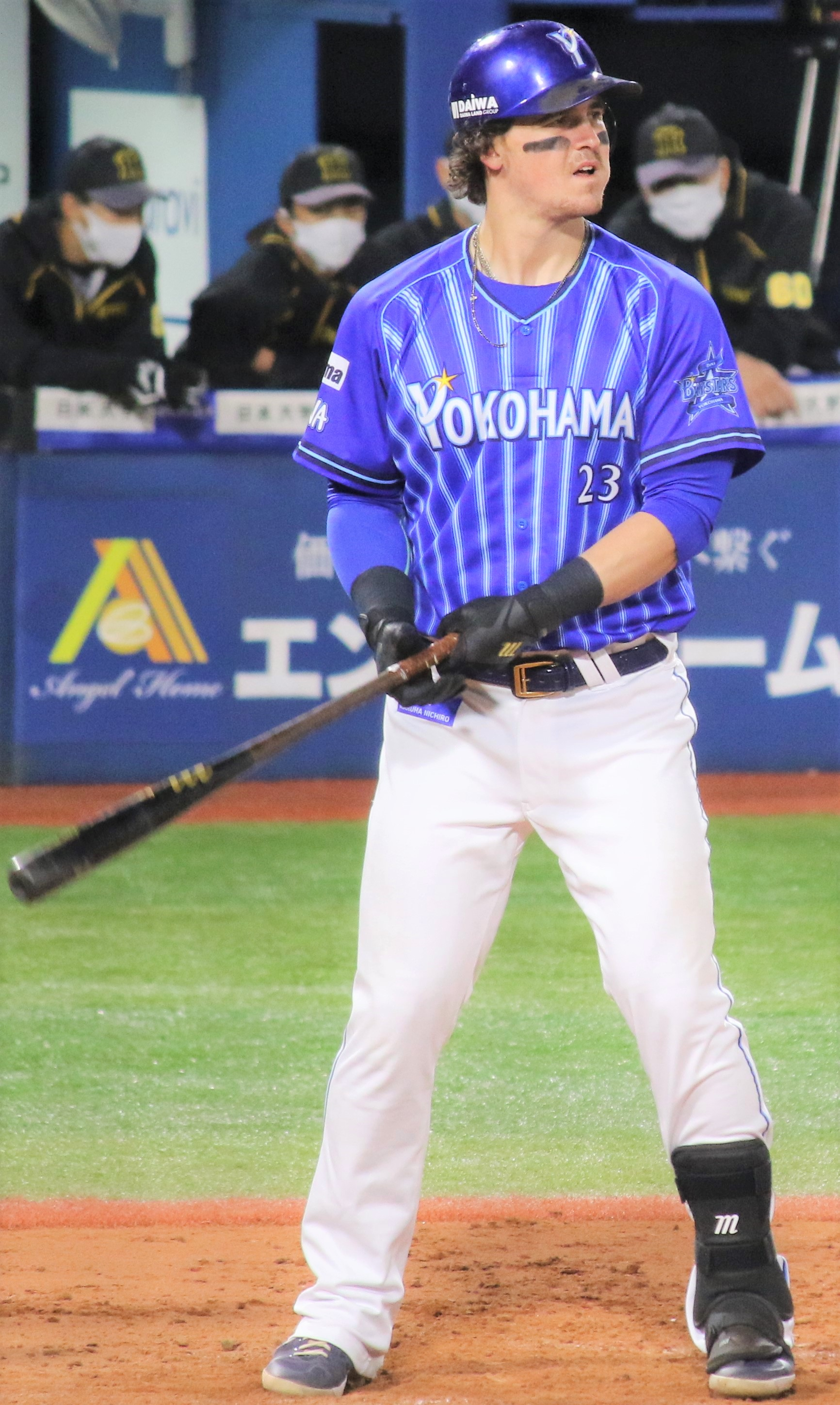
- Austin with the Yokohama DeNA BayStars

Free agent
- First baseman / Outfielder
- Born: September 6, 1991 (age 35); Conyers, Georgia, U.S.
- Bats: Right Throws: Right

Professional debut
- MLB: August 13, 2016, for the New York Yankees
- NPB: June 19, 2020, for the Yokohama DeNA BayStars

MLB statistics (through 2019 season)
- Batting average: .219
- Home runs: 33
- Runs batted in: 91

NPB statistics (through 2025 season)
- Batting average: .293
- Home runs: 85
- Runs batted in: 236
- Stats at Baseball Reference

Teams
- New York Yankees (2016–2018); Minnesota Twins (2018–2019); San Francisco Giants (2019); Milwaukee Brewers (2019); Yokohama DeNA BayStars (2020–2025)

Career highlights and awards
- Japan Series champion (2024); 2x NPB All-Star (2024, 2025); Central League batting champion (2024)
Medals
Men's baseball
Representing United States
Olympic Games
Silver medal – second place	2020 Tokyo	Team

Christopher Tyler Austin (born September 6, 1991) is an American professional baseball first baseman and outfielder who is a free agent. He has previously played in Major League Baseball (MLB) for the New York Yankees, Minnesota Twins, San Francisco Giants, and Milwaukee Brewers, and in Nippon Professional Baseball (NPB) for the Yokohama DeNA BayStars.

Austin played baseball for Heritage High School in Conyers, Georgia, before the Yankees selected him in the 2010 MLB draft. He became a highly regarded prospect, but missed playing time due to injuries. Austin made his MLB debut in 2016. He played for the Yankees until 2018, when he was traded to the Twins. He played for the Twins and the Giants in 2019. The Giants released him during the season, and he signed a minor league contract with the Brewers.

== Early life ==
Austin is the oldest of three sons born to Kim and Chris Austin. He also has two younger brothers, Dylan and Kyle. Though he grew up in Conyers, Georgia, 25 miles (40 km) from Atlanta, Austin grew up as a fan of the New York Yankees of Major League Baseball (MLB), and considered Derek Jeter to be his favorite player.

Austin attended Heritage High School in Conyers. He played for the school's baseball team as a catcher, third baseman, and pitcher. He was invited to play in amateur showcase tournaments, such as the AFLAC All-American Game. In 2008, his sophomore season, Austin had a .626 batting average with 19 home runs, and The Rockdale Citizen named him the high school baseball hitter of the year. At the age of 17, Austin was diagnosed with testicular cancer. He had surgery to remove the tumor, but did not require chemotherapy as the cancer was caught early and did not spread to other parts of his body.

== Professional career ==
=== New York Yankees ===
Austin committed to attend Kennesaw State University on a college baseball scholarship to play for the Kennesaw State Owls. Noticed by Yankees' area scout Darryl Monroe, the Yankees selected Austin in the 13th round, with the 415th overall selection, of the 2010 MLB draft as a catcher. Austin chose to sign with the Yankees rather than enroll at Kennesaw State, receiving a $130,000 signing bonus. He made his professional debut with the Gulf Coast Yankees of the Rookie-level Gulf Coast League, playing in two games. In 2011, Austin began the season with the Gulf Coast Yankees, before receiving a promotion to the Staten Island Yankees of the Low–A New York–Penn League. He had a .354 batting average across the 2011 season. Though he was drafted as a catcher, Austin spent most of his playing time as a first baseman and third baseman.

Austin began the 2012 season with the Charleston RiverDogs of the Single–A South Atlantic League. He was named to appear in the South Atlantic League All-Star Game. After hitting 14 home runs with Charleston, the Yankees promoted Austin to the Tampa Yankees of the High–A Florida State League in July. He was chosen to represent the Yankees in the All-Star Futures Game, but suffered a head injury in July 2012, which caused him to withdraw from the game. After the end of Tampa's regular season, the Yankees promoted Austin again, this time to the Trenton Thunder of the Double–A Eastern League, so that he could play for the Thunder during the Eastern League postseason. He finished the 2012 season, hitting .322 with a .400 on base percentage, .559 slugging percentage, 17 home runs, and 80 runs batted in (RBIs). Brian Cashman, the Yankees' general manager, referred to Austin as a "mega prospect" in August 2012. Austin won the Yankees' Minor League Player of the Year Award for the 2012 season.

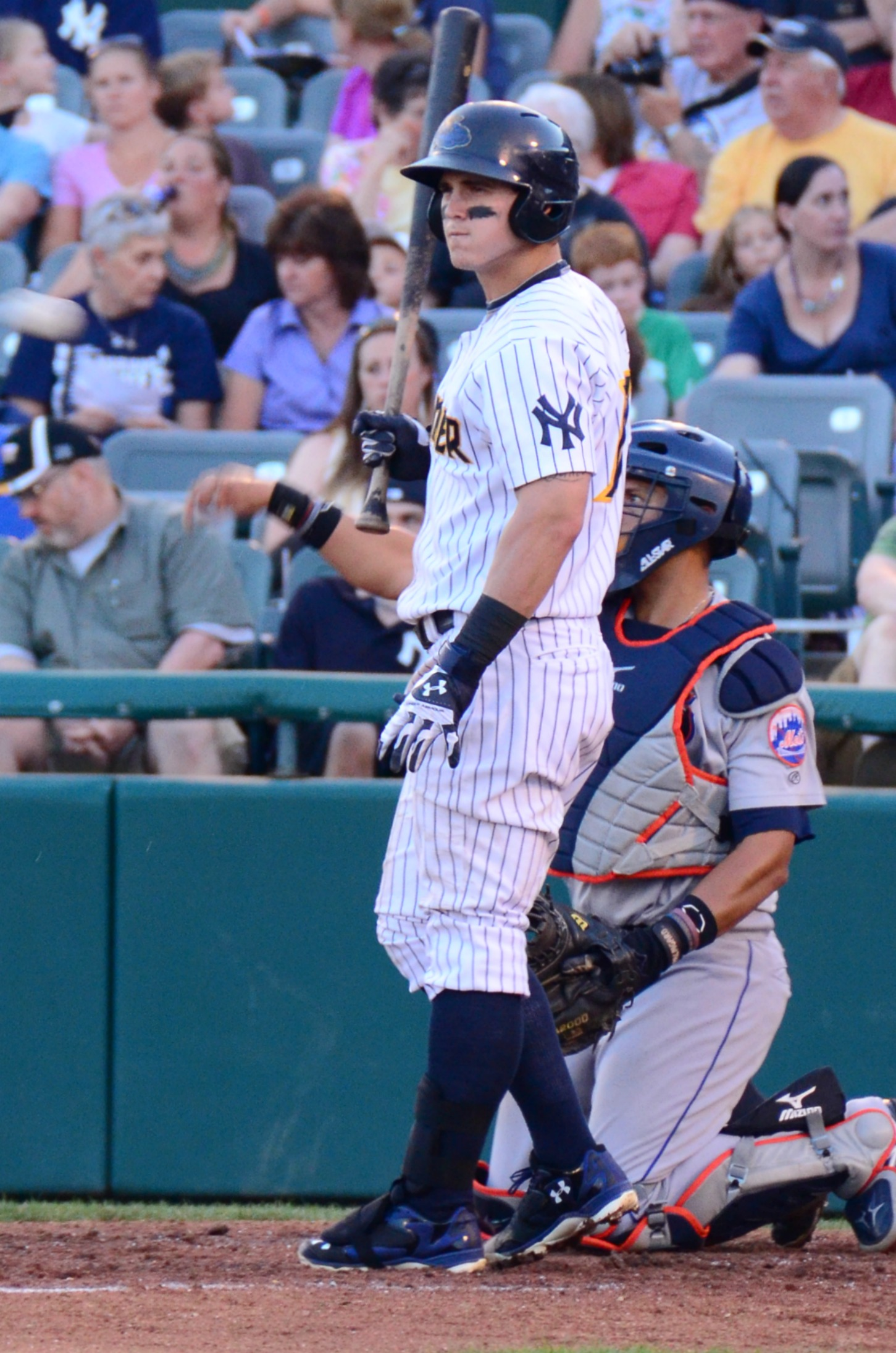
Austin with the Trenton Thunder in 2014

Prior to the 2013 season, Austin was ranked as the 77th best prospect in baseball by Baseball America. The Yankees invited Austin to spring training in 2013 as a non-roster player. He played for Trenton, primarily as an outfielder. He was selected to appear in the Eastern League All-Star Game. Austin went on the disabled list with a wrist injury in July, which caused him to miss almost 60 games. He batted .257 with a .344 on-base percentage and a .373 slugging percentage with six home runs and 40 RBIs in 83 games for Trenton in 2013. The Yankees assigned him to the Scottsdale Scorpions of the Arizona Fall League (AFL) after the regular season.

Austin lost about 10 pounds (4.5 kg) by focusing on nutrition and gained strength during the 2013–14 offseason. After battling a flare up of his wrist injury from the previous season, he returned to Trenton for the 2014 season. He batted .275 with nine home runs and 47 RBIs in 105 games during the 2014 season. After the regular season, the Yankees again assigned Austin to Scottsdale in the AFL, but his playing time was limited by a knee injury. On November 20, 2014, the Yankees added Austin to their 40-man roster to protect him from being selected in the Rule 5 draft.

Austin played for the Scranton/Wilkes-Barre RailRiders of the Triple–A International League at the start of the 2015 season. He struggled with the RailRiders, hitting .230 before missing time with an injury in late June. The Yankees demoted Austin to the Trenton Thunder after he batted .235 in 73 games for Scranton/Wilkes-Barre. He batted .260 with two home runs and eight RBIs for Trenton. The Yankees designated him for assignment at the end of the minor league season in September, removing him from their 40-man roster. He went unclaimed on waivers, and the Yankees sent him outright to Trenton. The Yankees assigned him to the AFL for the third time after the 2015 season, as a replacement for the injured Eric Jagielo.

The Yankees did not invite Austin to spring training in 2016. He began the season with Trenton, where he batted .260 in 50 games. The Yankees promoted Austin to Scranton/Wilkes-Barre during the season. Austin batted .323 with 13 home runs and 49 RBIs in 57 games for Scranton/Wilkes-Barre.

The Yankees promoted Austin to the major league roster on August 13, 2016. He made his major league debut that day. In his first at bat, he hit his first major league home run off Matt Andriese. With the next at bat, Aaron Judge, also making his debut, hit a home run. This marked the first time that two teammates had hit home runs in their first at bats in the same game. Austin batted .241 with five home runs, but also had 36 strikeouts in 90 plate appearances.

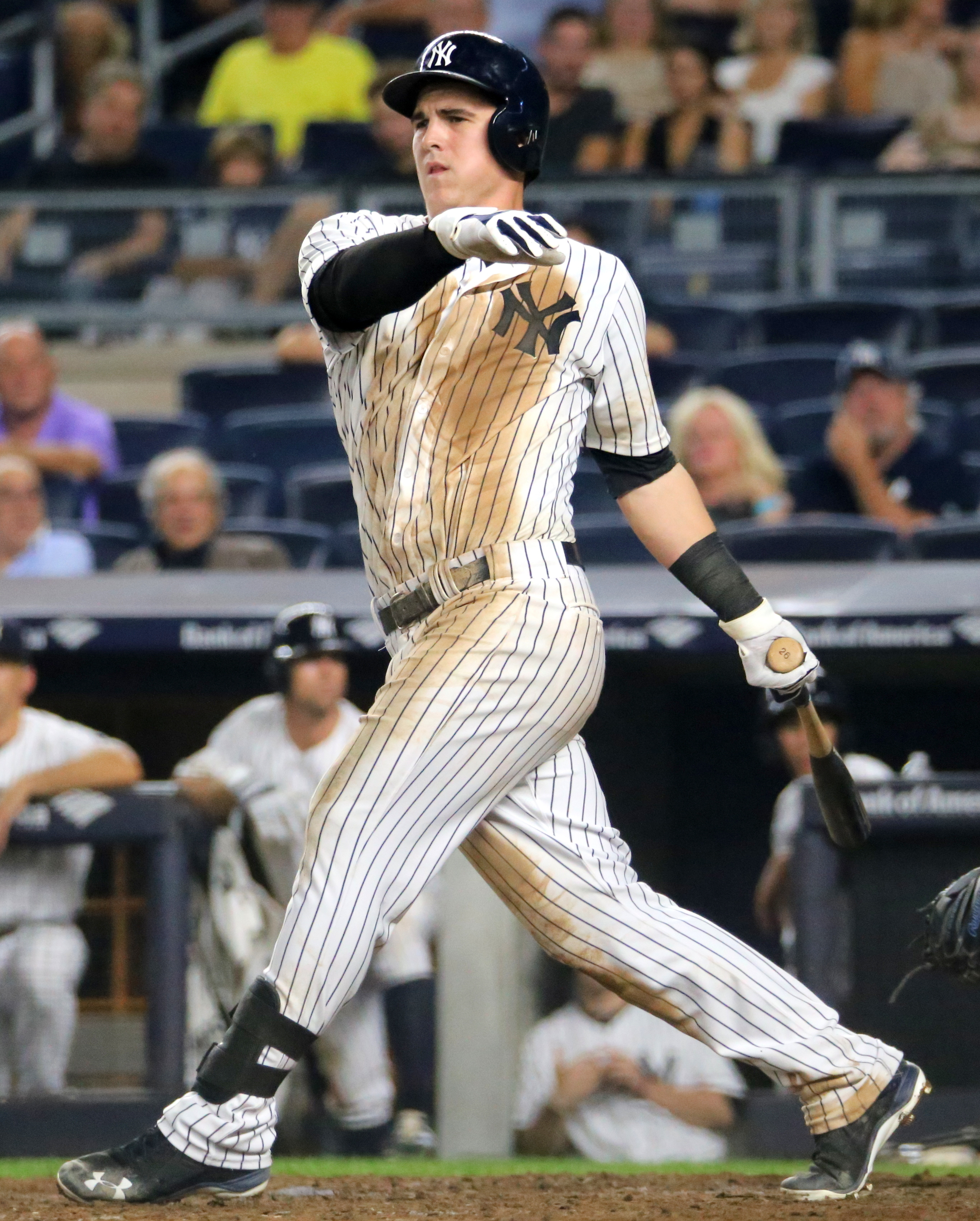
Austin with the New York Yankees in 2016

His second career home run came on his 25th birthday, giving the Yankees the lead in a win against the Toronto Blue Jays. Then two days later, on September 8, Austin led-off the bottom of the ninth inning with a walk-off home run off Erasmo Ramírez, to give the Yankees its season-high fifth consecutive victory, 5–4, over the visiting Tampa Bay Rays. It was the third home run for Austin in his 17th career game. According to the Elias Sports Bureau, Austin is the first player in the modern-era to hit a home run in his first at-bat, hit a home run on his birthday, and hit a walk-off home run within the first three home runs of his Major League career.

Austin suffered a fracture of the navicular area of his left foot on February 17, 2017. He was ruled out for six weeks. On April 2, 2017, he was placed on the 60-day disabled list. He returned to Scranton/Wilkes-Barre on a rehabilitation assignment on May 26. The Yankees activated him from the disabled list and optioned him to Scranton/Wilkes-Barre on June 5. The Yankees promoted Austin to the major leagues on June 24, after designating Chris Carter for assignment. He batted 2-for-13 (.154) with a home run in four games before injuring his right hamstring. He went on the disabled list, and was activated and optioned to Scranton/Wilkes-Barre on August 11. On August 17, Austin was called back up after Garrett Cooper was injured. On August 19, Austin hit a three-run homer off Boston Red Sox ace Chris Sale which helped them win a major game in a pennant race.

Austin made the Yankees' Opening Day roster in 2018. On April 11, 2018, against the Red Sox at Fenway Park, Austin was hit by a pitch from Joe Kelly in possible retaliation for spiking Brock Holt earlier in the game. Austin then slammed his bat into the dirt in anger and charged the mound, causing a bench-clearing brawl. Four players, including Austin, were ejected. This was Austin's first career ejection. The following day, Austin was suspended for five games and fined an undisclosed amount. Austin's suspension was reduced to four games on appeal. On June 14, 2018, Austin was optioned to Triple-A Scranton/Wilkes Barre.

=== Minnesota Twins ===
On July 30, 2018, the Yankees traded Austin and Luis Rijo to the Minnesota Twins for Lance Lynn. The Twins assigned him to the Rochester Red Wings of the International League, whom Scranton was playing at the time. He also hit a home run in his first game with Rochester. The Twins promoted him to the major leagues, and he hit a home run in his first game as a Twin on August 11. Austin batted .236 with nine home runs and 24 RBIs in 35 games for the Twins, and 17 home runs in 69 games with the Yankees and Twins.

Austin made the Twins' Opening Day roster in 2019, though the Twins also added C. J. Cron and Nelson Cruz as options to play first base and designated hitter. On April 6, 2019, Austin was designated for assignment following the selection of Chase De Jong’s contract.

=== San Francisco Giants ===
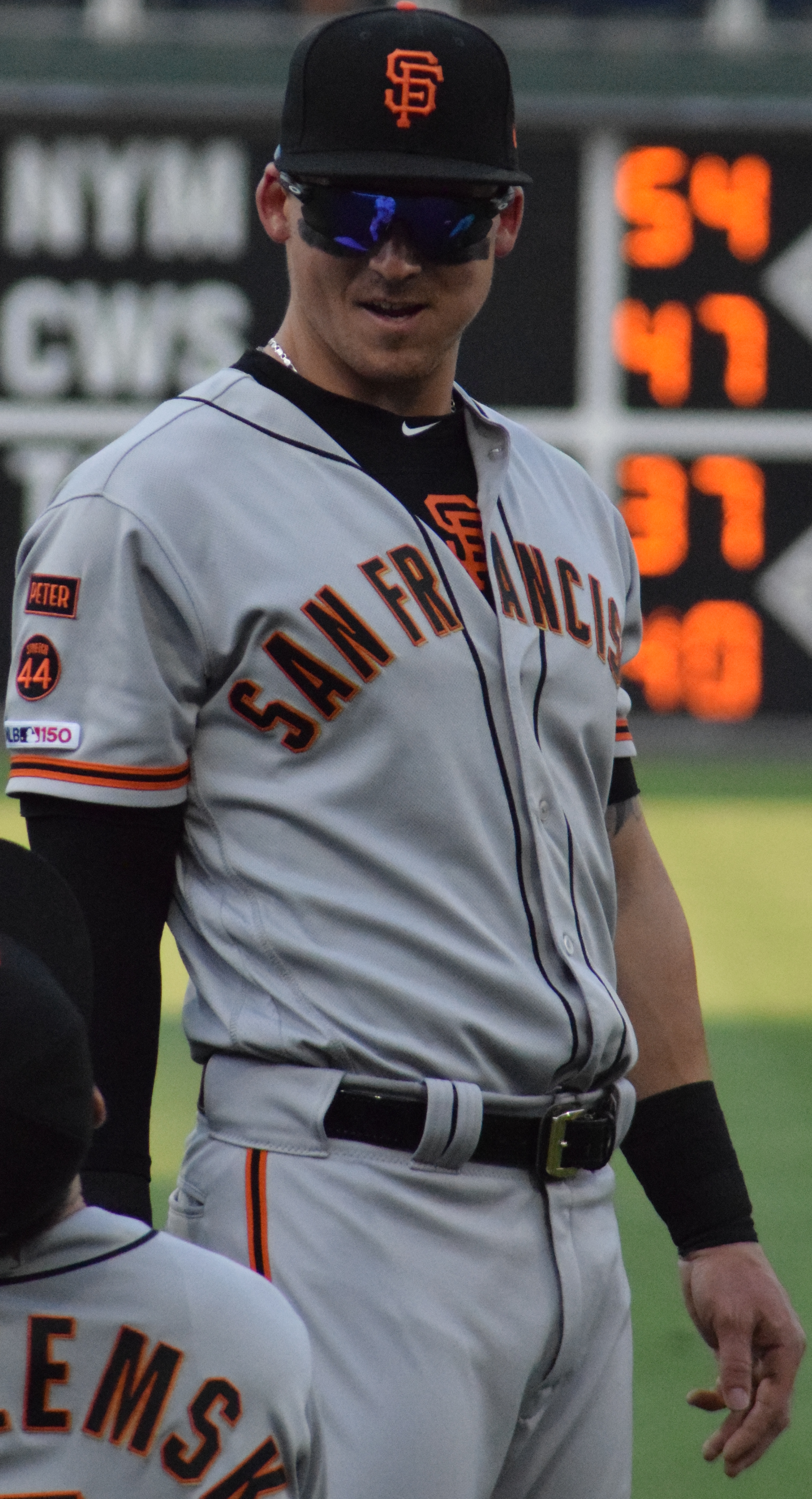
Austin with the San Francisco Giants in 2019

On April 8, 2019, the Twins traded Austin to the San Francisco Giants for Malique Ziegler. Austin batted .187 for the Giants, and they designated him for assignment on August 2. Shortly thereafter, Austin elected free agency.

=== Milwaukee Brewers ===
On August 16, 2019, Austin signed a minor league contract with the Milwaukee Brewers, who assigned him to the San Antonio Missions of the Triple-A Pacific Coast League. After he batted .333 with four home runs and 10 RBIs in 15 games for San Antonio, the Brewers promoted Austin to the major leagues on September 1. Austin became a free agent following the 2019 season.

=== Yokohama DeNA BayStars ===
On November 15, 2019, Austin signed a one-year contract with the Yokohama DeNA BayStars of Nippon Professional Baseball. Austin made 65 appearances for the team in 2020, batting .286/.364/.605 with 20 home runs and 56 RBI. He returned to the team the following season, hitting .303/.405/.601 with 28 home runs and 74 RBI.

Austin played in 38 games for Yokohama in the 2022 season, slashing .156/.289/.313 with one home run and three RBI. He appeared in 22 contests with the BayStars during the 2023 campaign, batting .277/.352/.404 with six RBI.

Austin played in 106 games for Yokohama in 2024, slashing .316/.382/.601 with 25 home runs and 69 RBIs. He won the NPB batting title, edging out Tokyo Yakult Swallows outfielder Domingo Santana's .315 average.

Austin made 65 appearances for the BayStars in the 2025 season, batting .269/.350/.484 with 11 home runs and 28 RBIs. On November 13, 2025, Yokohama designated Austin as a free agent.

=== Chicago Cubs ===
On December 18, 2025, Austin signed a one-year, $1.25 million contract with the Chicago Cubs. On February 25, 2026, it was announced that Austin would miss "months" after undergoing a debridement procedure on the patellar tendon in his right knee. On November 2, the Cubs sent Austin outright off the 40-man roster and he elected free agency.

== International career ==
On July 2, 2021, Austin was named to the roster for the United States national baseball team at the 2020 Summer Olympics, contested in 2021 in Tokyo. The team went on to win silver, losing to hosts Japan in the gold medal game.

== Personal life ==
Austin co-designed a logo that has been printed on T-shirts, with the proceeds of the sales going to the Sean Kimerling Testicular Cancer Foundation.

Austin married his high school sweetheart, Stephanie, in January 2019.

== See also ==
- List of Major League Baseball players with a home run in their first major league at bat
