= Rockdale County High School =

Public high school in Conyers, Georgia, United States

Location
- 1174 Bulldog Circle NE; Conyers, Georgia 30012-4797; United States
- Coordinates: 33°40′03″N 84°00′27″W

Information
- Type: Public
- Established: 1954
- School district: Rockdale County School District
- Principal: Ogé Denis, Jr.
- Teaching staff: 126.00 FTE
- Grades: 9 to 12
- Gender: Coeducational
- Enrollment: 2,391 (2023-2024)
- Student to teacher ratio: 18.98
- Colors: Red and black
- Athletics conference: 3 AAAAAA
- Mascot: Bulldogs
- Nickname: RCHS
- Accreditation: Southern Association of Colleges and Schools
- Yearbook: Tempus Fugit
- Website: Rockdale County High School

Rockdale County High School is located in the heart of Conyers, Georgia, United States, in the old-town district. RCHS is one of three high schools located in Rockdale County, along with Heritage High School and Salem High School. RCHS formerly hosted the Rockdale Magnet School for Science and Technology on its campus before they moved to the CJ Hicks Elementary School complex.

The school's mascot is the Bulldog. Approximately 2,100 students are enrolled.

== Athletics ==
Rockdale County High School is a part of the GHSA in Region 3-AAAAAA. They had athletes such as Grady Jarrett In the 2008–2009, RCHS won Fox 5's High 5 Sports Team of the Week award twice, the first school ever to do so. The hand-shaped trophies were awarded to the football and wrestling teams.

== Fine arts ==
The school is a Grammy School of Excellence. The literary team won the regional title in 2003, and the boys' quartet won the state title.

In the 2007–2008 school year, the Advanced Musical Theater Class took Ragtime to One Act Competition, and won first place. After winning first place at regionals, they later went on to take third place at state, beating performing arts schools.

In the 2008–2009 school year, the Rockdale County High School Marching Band won the Grand Champion trophy in competition at the Southern Star Invitational competition.

Rockdale County High School Winter Guard won first place and the gold medal at the 2011 SAPA Championships in the Scholastic AA class. The winter guard also consistently came in first place at competitions throughout the 2010–2011 season.

The Rockdale marching band has a recent history of respectable percussion sections. In 2016, the percussion section came within a point of the best-in-class percussion award at both of the marching band's competitions. The band competed in class AAA.

The Marching Band participated in the Children's Healthcare of Atlanta Christmas parade on December 1, 2018.

== Magnet school ==
The Rockdale Magnet School (formally, the Rockdale Magnet School for Science and Technology) is a magnet school located in Rockdale County in the city of Conyers. It is a selective school whose students take on rigorous college-level courses in mathematics, the natural sciences, technology/engineering, and research.

The magnet school occupies the building that was previously C.J. Hicks Elementary School (also located in Conyers); CJHE moved into a newly constructed elementary school building in 2009.

The Rockdale Magnet School accepts approximately 100 students annually. 90 freshmen were accepted in 2019. In 2025, 103 freshmen were accepted (Class of 2029)

Magnet school achievements include students being accepted to the nation's top universities, including Harvard and MIT; a state-champion Math Team; several perfect SAT and ACT subscores and one perfect ACT composite score; and several winners of science and research fairs such as the Intel International Science and Engineering Fair and the Siemens Competition.

It was opened in 2000 to provide a rigorous high school curriculum for the youth in Rockdale County. The school focuses on the fields of mathematics, sciences, and technology. Magnet students are enrolled in selective classes in those fields composed only of magnet students (approximately 10-15 students per class period, as opposed to Rockdale County High School's average class size of 30), and the rest of their classes are taken with the standard student population of Rockdale County High School.

Courses are set on a college-level curriculum. The college scholarship amount exceeds 3 million annually.

Since 2002, the school has sent 9-12 students to Metz, France each year to aid high school students with their own science fair projects. This is through a partnership with Georgia Tech, specifically their Georgia Tech Lorraine campus. Students also visit Paris each year and live with French students. The French students visit Rockdale each spring to present their scientific or cultural projects and to attend a France Dance in their honor.

== Notable alumni ==
- Geoff Collins, college football coach, Temple and Georgia Tech
- Buck Farmer, pitcher for the Cincinnati Reds
- Neville Hewitt, inside linebacker for the Houston Texans
- Candace Hill, 100m and 200m sprint IAAF World Youth Championship winner
- Holly Hunter, Academy and Emmy award-winning actress
- Grady Jarrett, defensive tackle for the Atlanta Falcons
- Nebu Kiniza, Rapper famous for his song "Gassed Up"
- Robert McCray, NFL player
- James C. Miller III, FTC Chairman and Director of Office of Management and Budget
- Johnny Rapid (Hylan Anthony Taylor), gay pornographic film star
- Kevin Ware, former basketball player for the University of Louisville
- Jasmiyah Kaneesha Whitehead and Tasmiyah Kaneesha Whitehead, identical twin sisters, were students at Rockdale County High School at the time of the murder of Nikki Whitehead in 2010. Both pleaded guilty to matricide in 2014 and were sentenced to 30 years in prison.
