= Dial Mill =

- U.S. National Register of Historic Places
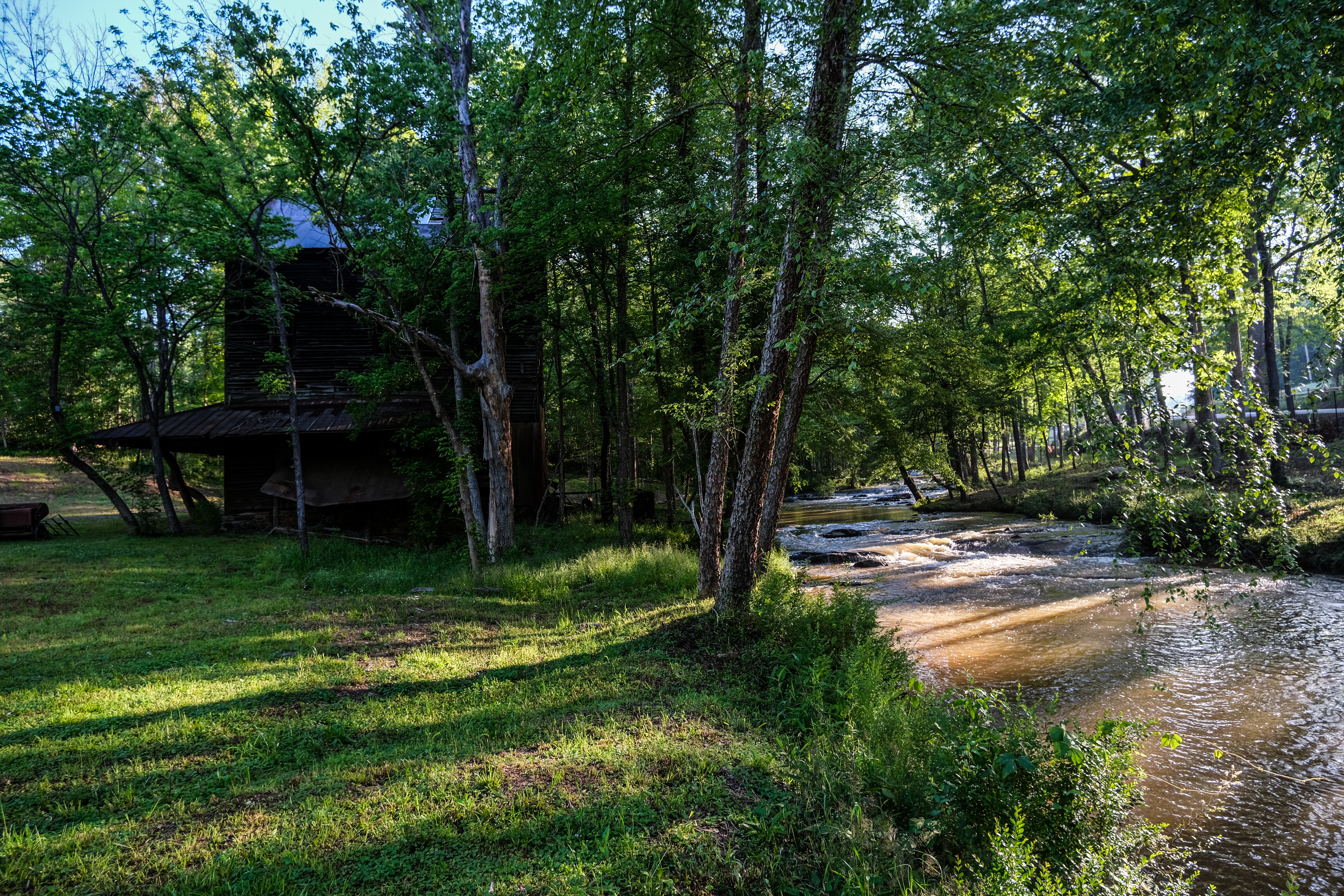
- Photo of Dial Mill - 2023 - Conyers, Georgia

- Location within Georgia Location within the United States
- Nearest city: Conyers, Georgia
- Coordinates: 33.71158°N 83.91426°W
- Area: 4.5 acres (1.8 ha)
- Built: 1830
- NRHP reference No.: 78001005
- Added to NRHP: April 6, 1978

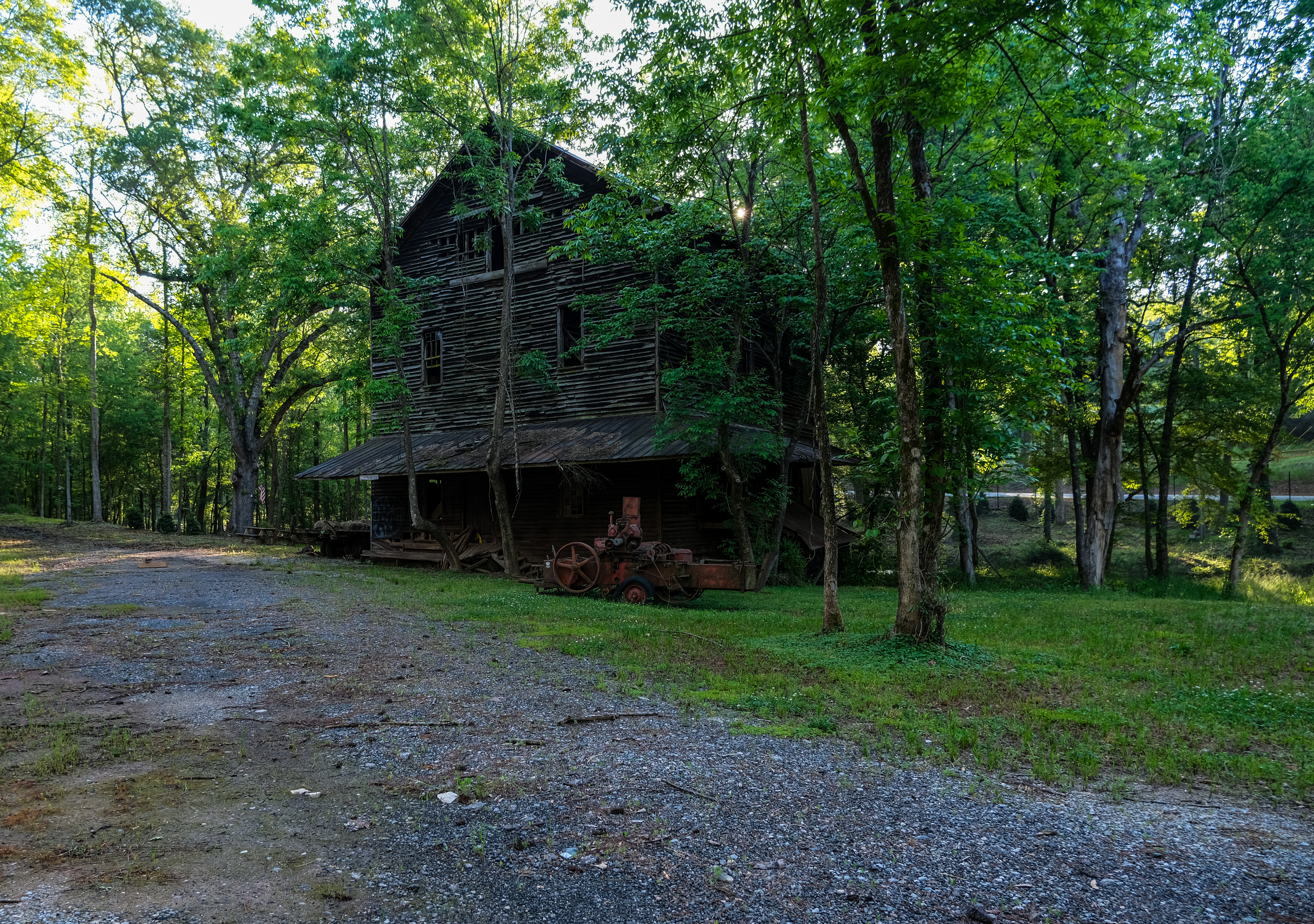
Dial Mill (added to the National Register of Historical Places in 1978 - - #78001005)

Dial Mill is a historic gristmill and flour mill outside of Conyers, Georgia. It was added to the National Register of Historic Places on April 6, 1977.

The mill is a three-story frame building but as tall as a modern five-story building. It is made of hand-hewn virgin pine, with sixteen-inch square interior beams. It has a one-story shed addition on the north side and an overhanging roof at first-floor level around the west and south sides. The building has flour and corn milling equipment "with shuts and grain elevators containing an intricate system of belts and pulleys which carried grain from floor to floor during the milling process."

It is located northeast of Conyers off GA 138, near the historic Hightower Trail.

It is significant as one of the first mills in this area of Georgia.

== See also ==
- National Register of Historic Places listings in Rockdale County, Georgia
