= Testicular Cancer Foundation =

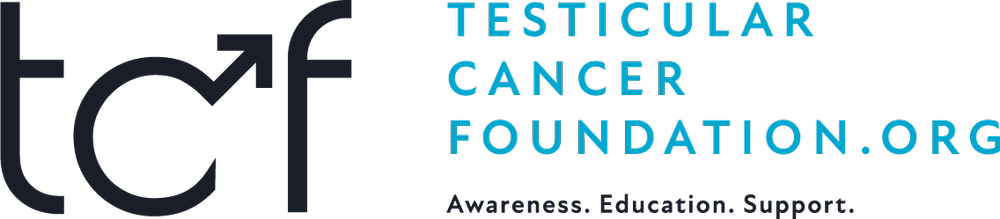
- Abbreviation: TCF
- Formation: 2009; 17 years ago
- Founder: Matt Ferstler
- Founded at: Austin, Texas, United States
- Type: Nonprofit organization
- Legal status: 501(c)(3) organization
- Purpose: Testicular cancer awareness and support
- Headquarters: Austin, Texas, United States
- Region served: United States
- Chief executive officer: Kenny Kane
- Chief mission officer: Connor O'Leary
- Key people: Matt Ferstler
- Website: testicularcancer.org
- Formerly called: Single Jingles: A Testicular Cancer Foundation

Testicular Cancer Foundation (TCF) is an American nonprofit organization focused on raising awareness about testicular cancer and providing support to patients and survivors. It focuses on males aged 15–35, with an emphasis on early detection through self-examination and awareness programs.

== History ==
Testicular Cancer Foundation was established in 2009 in Austin, Texas, by testicular cancer survivor Matt Ferstler. It was originally named Single Jingles: A Testicular Cancer Foundation. Ferstler, who was diagnosed at the age of 21, founded the organization shortly after completing treatment to educate young men about testicular cancer. One of TCF’s early initiatives was the "MAN UP: Check ‘Em" campaign, which promoted monthly testicular self-examinations. During its early years, the foundation also participated in No-Shave November, a fundraising campaign where men grow facial hair during November and pledge donations to men's health charities. As part of this effort, TCF worked with multiple police departments across Central Texas to raise funds.

By 2013, TCF had formed a national speakers' bureau composed of survivors who conducted educational outreach at schools and community organizations.

In 2015, Connor O'Leary, a former professional cyclist and testicular cancer survivor, joined the organization as the Chief Mission Officer (CMO). In 2016, Kenny Kane was appointed executive director and later became chief executive officer. The organization subsequently phased out the "Single Jingles" name in favor of the Testicular Cancer Foundation.

== Operations ==
The Testicular Cancer Foundation focuses on education, awareness, and patient support. It distributes educational materials, including a waterproof self-exam instruction card designed for use in showers. In the early 2010s, TCF also developed a smartphone application, Single Jingles, which provided guidance on performing self-examinations.

The foundation hosts an annual Testicular Cancer Summit, a multi-day conference for survivors, caregivers, and medical professionals. Its awareness campaigns have included the "Get In Touch With Your Testes," which used animated characters to explain self-examination.
