= Elizabeth Terrell =

American painter (1908–1993)

Elizabeth E. Terrell
- Born: 1908; Toledo, Ohio
- Died: 1993 (aged 84–85)
- Occupation: Painter
- Known for: Abstract and modern art

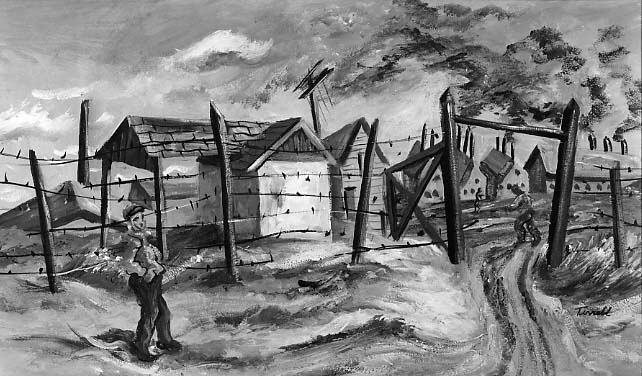
Industrial Landscape, gouache on paper, by Elizabeth Terrell, ca. 1939

Elizabeth E. Terrell (1908 – 1993) was an American artist who completed works for the Works Progress Administration. Born in Toledo, Ohio, Terrell is known for her abstract and modern figures, still life paintings, and murals. She exhibited her art at the Art Institute of Chicago, Brooklyn Museum of Art, Metropolitan Museum of Art, Museum of Modern Art, New York, Pennsylvania Academy of Fine Arts and Whitney Museum of American Art. She did frescos, mixed media, mosaics, gouache and oil paintings. She produced a mural at the Starke, Florida Post Office titled "Reforestation" (1942). She was part of an exhibition with Rufino Tamayo and Julian Levi at the Ottumwa Art Center in Ottumwa, Iowa. Her work is in the collection of the Smithsonian American Art Museum.

The post office in Conyers, Georgia contains the mural, The Ploughman, (tempera on paperboard) painted by Terrell in 1940. It was funded as part of an arts program by the United States government, 1934 to 1943, through the Section of Painting and Sculpture, later called the Section of Fine Arts, of the Treasury Department.

== Selected works ==
- "Calico Cat" (1938) Gouache on board
- "The Trimmer" (ca. 1938-1939) at the Smithsonian American Art Museum
- "Industrial Landscape" (ca. 1939) at the Metropolitan Museum of Art
- "The Ploughman" (1940) mural at Old railroad depot in Conyers, Georgia
- "The Ploughman" (1940) mural at the Conyers, Georgia Old Post Office, moved to the new Post Office
