= Aaron and Margaret Parker Jr. House =

Farm house on US National Register of Historic Places

- U.S. National Register of Historic Places
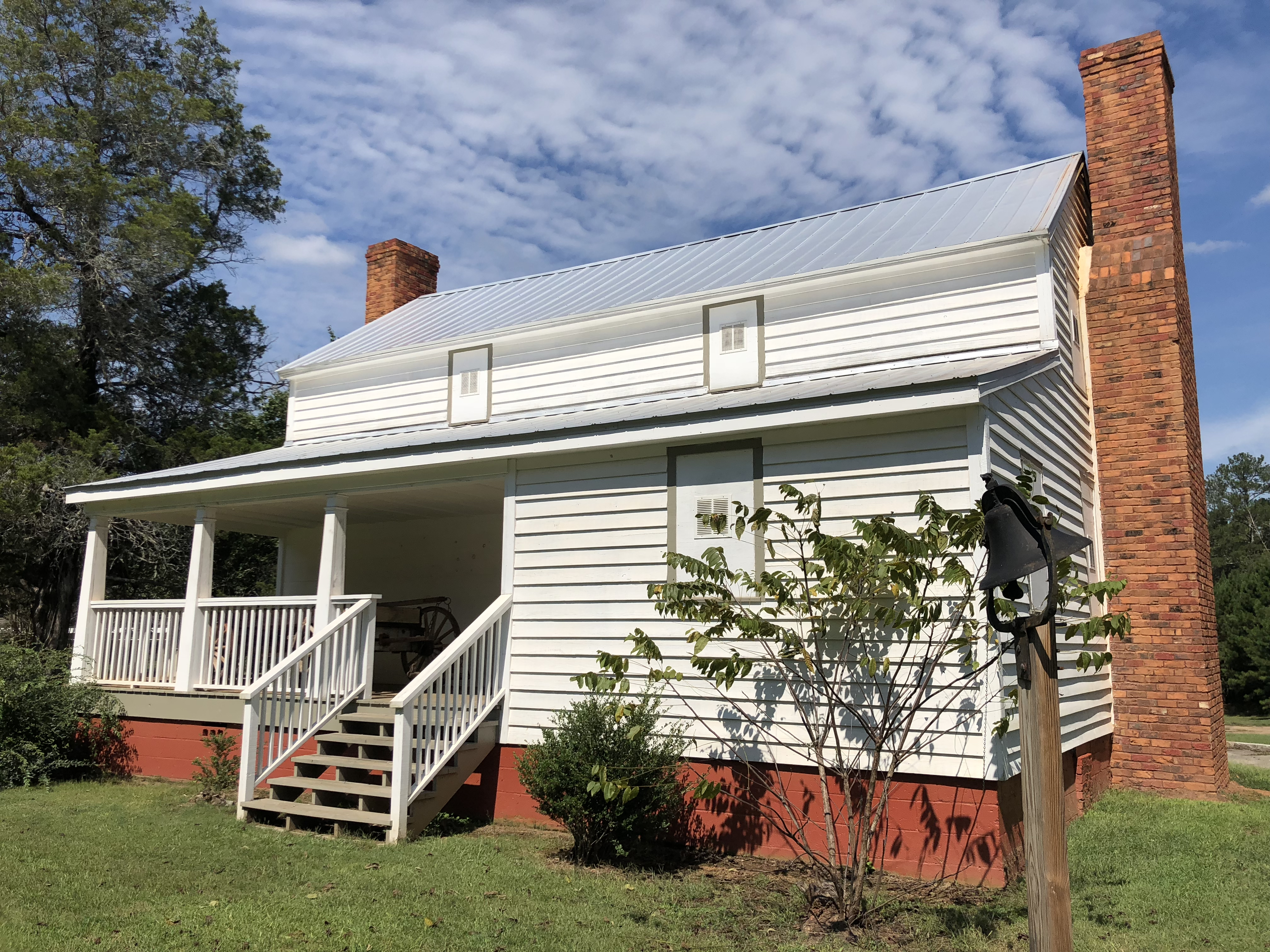

- Location within Georgia
- Location: 4835 Flat Bridge Road, Stockbridge, Georgia
- Coordinates: 33.63177°N 84.14533°W
- Area: less than 1 acre (0.40 ha)
- Built: c.1830
- Architectural style: Plantation plain
- NRHP reference No.: 09000271
- Added to NRHP: May 6, 2009

The Aaron and Margaret Parker Jr. House is a historic plantation house built c. 1830 that is one of the oldest houses in Rockdale County, Georgia, United States. It is located at 4835 Flat Bridge Road inside the Panola Mountain State Park. It is one and a half stories, constructed in the Plantation Plain style.

== History ==
The Parker house is of the Plantation Plain style and one-and-a-half stories tall. It is three bays wide and one room deep, with an extra travelers room adjacent to the front porch. There are two chimneys, one on each end wall.

Aaron Parker Jr. was born November 12, 1788, in North Carolina to Aaron and Charity Shuffield Parker Sr. The family moved to Clarke County, Georgia, the following year, and Parker was raised there. In 1806 he married Margaret Browning (born June 30, 1789), also originally from North Carolina. The couple would eventually have 14 children over 55 years of marriage.

Parker purchased land and moved his family from Clarke County in the spring of 1822. Parker purchased additional plots of land in the area and built the house here around 1830. At the time the land was part of Henry County (but would be split off to form Rockdale County in 1870).

Parker was active in the community, serving as county justice of the peace and postmaster general, but his primary occupation was farming. By 1850 he owned almost 3,000 acres (1,200 ha) of land, as well as 15 slaves. (That increased to 24 slaves by 1860, though his land holdings had decreased to 1,000 acres (400 ha)).

Parker died on January 5, 1881. His wife had died 10 years earlier. Both are buried in a cemetery in Rockdale County. His children inherited his property including 606 acres (245 ha) of remaining land. The house and land were sold several times during the 20th century. At times the house was rented to tenants.

In 1991 the property was being developed into the Southerness Golf Club, and the house was to be demolished. Community efforts prevented that, and instead the golf course incorporated the house, using the first floor as an office. A paved turn-around connected to the parking lot was built surrounding the house and the rest of the golf club's buildings were built nearby. The rear (north) facade of the house is directly adjacent to pavement but the other sides of the house are buffered by a small yard with a low rock wall. While it was included in the golf club, several changes were made including: new wood siding, reconstruction of the rear porch, brick veneer on the chimneys, and new doors and windows.

The golf course eventually closed and the Georgia Department of Natural Resources bought the 110 acres (45 ha) property for $790,000 in 2004. Since then the state has demolished the former golf club buildings and made other changes to create a more rural landscape. The Rockdale County Historical Society partnered with the state to perform a structural assessment and restore the house, which was in a "deplorable" condition.

Although it is not open to visitors generally, the park sometimes holds living history demonstrations at the house.

== Photos ==
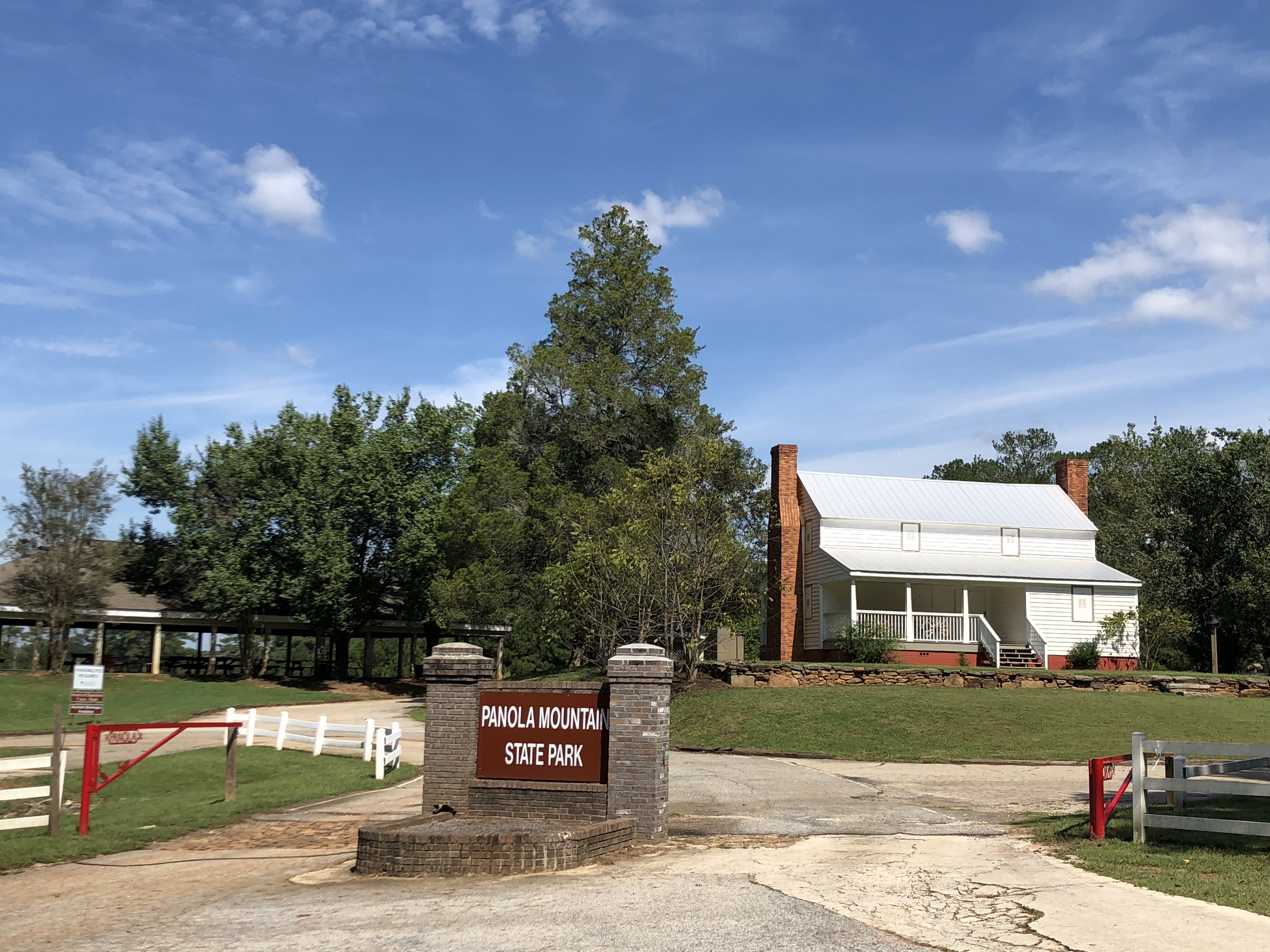
View from across the street showing the entrance to the Panola Mountain State Park.

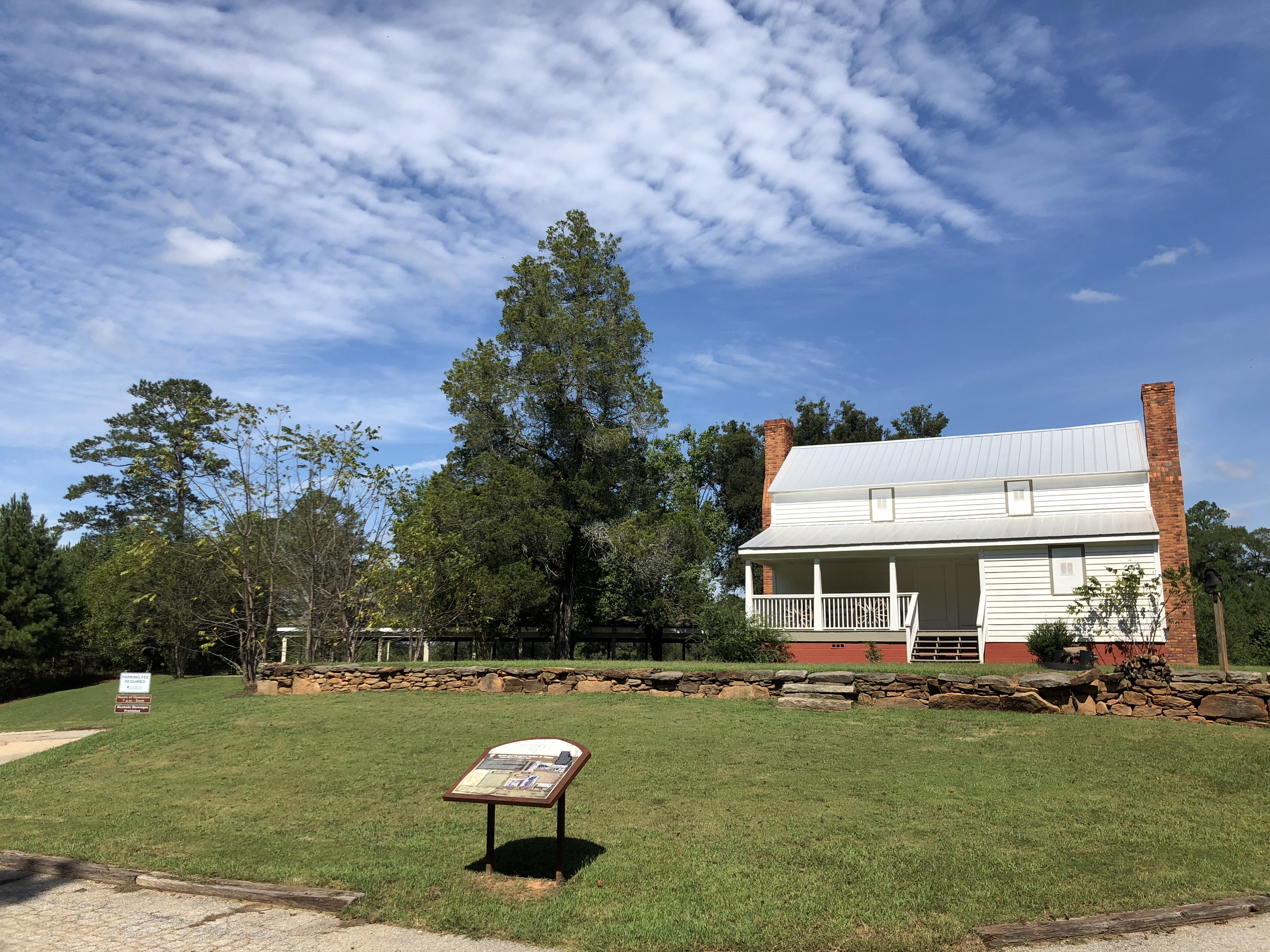
View including the yard, stone wall and a historical plaque placed by the state.

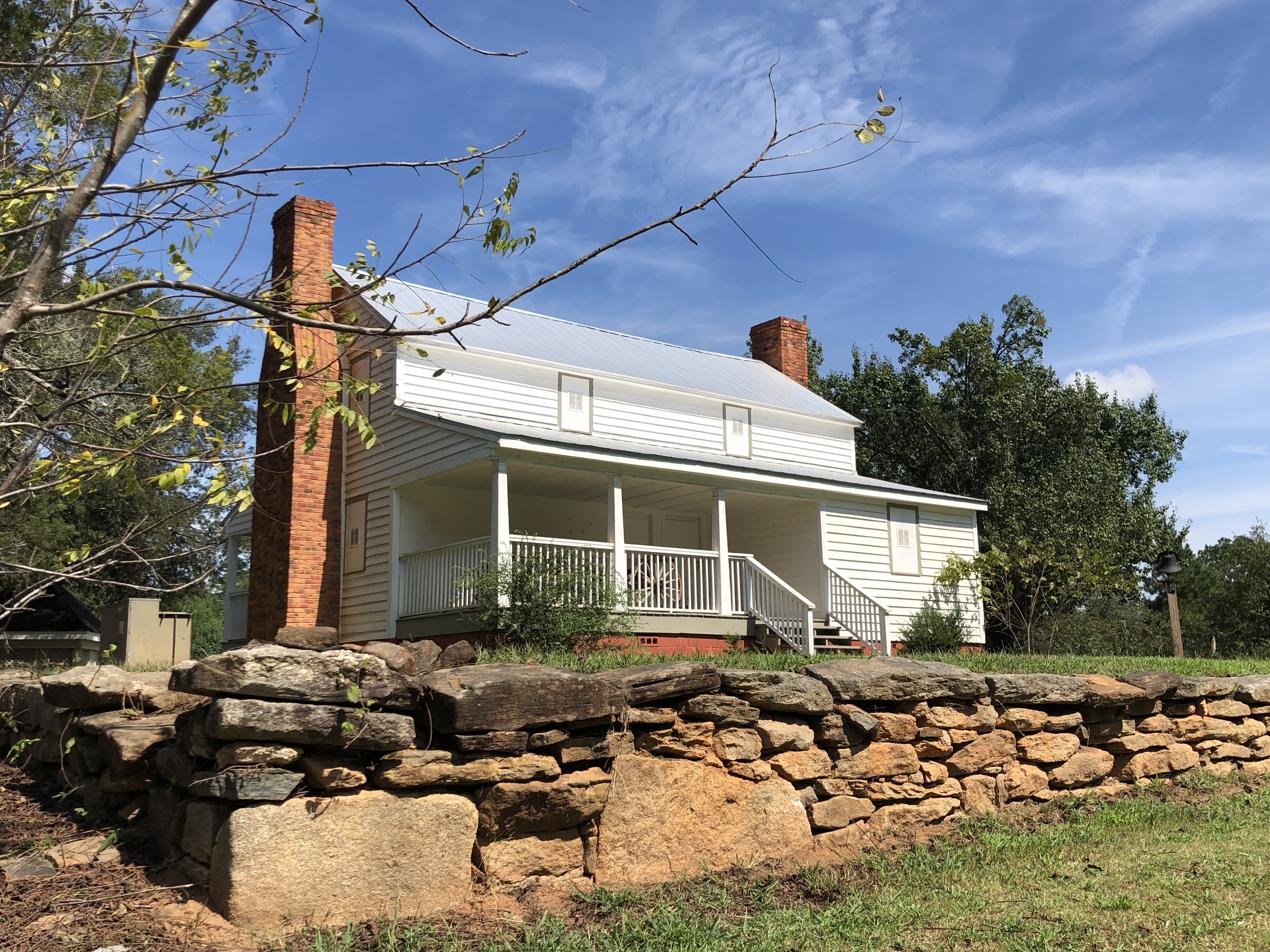
Another front view showing the historic stone wall.

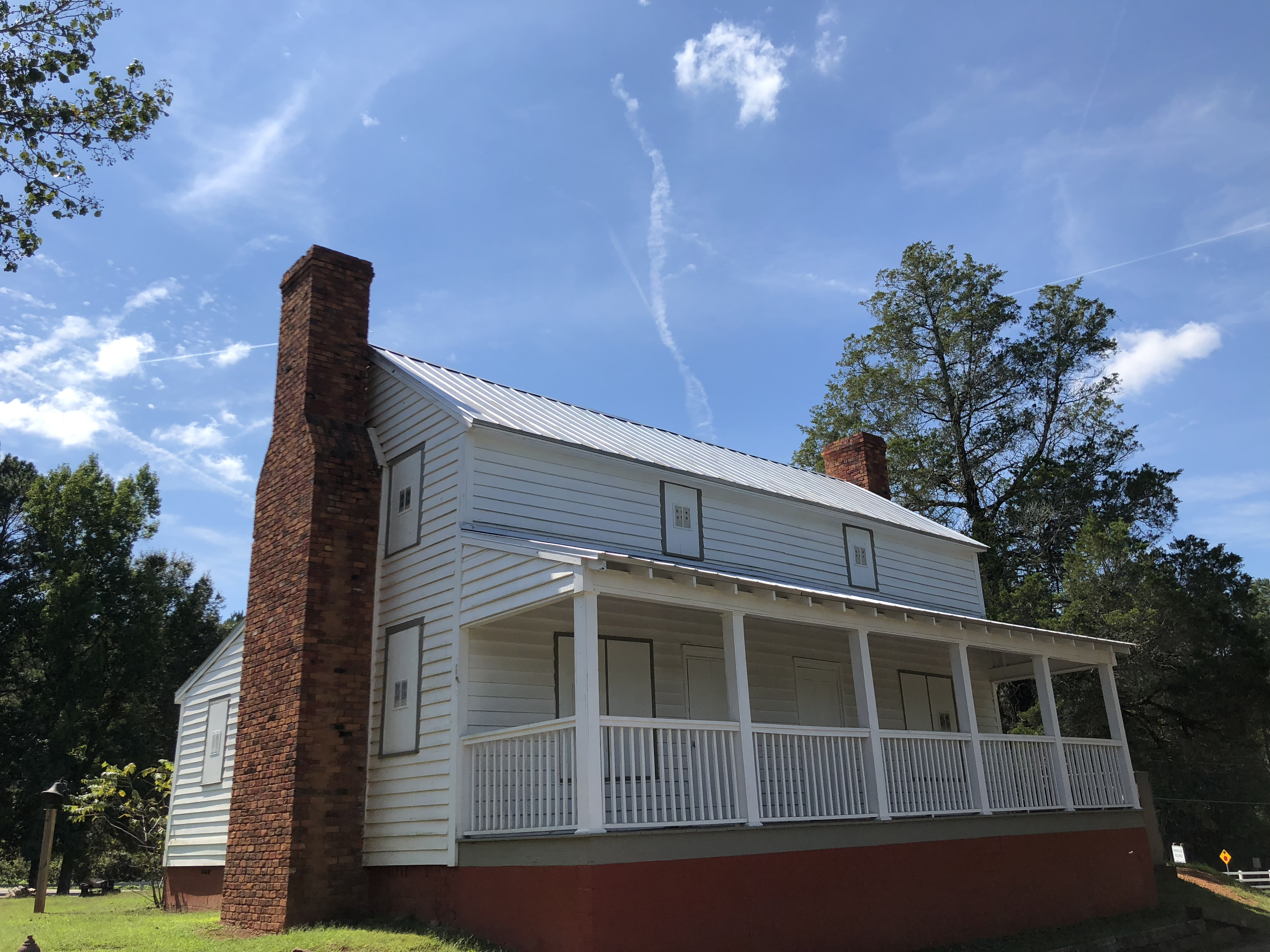
The rear of the house.

== See also ==
- National Register of Historic Places listings in Rockdale County, Georgia
