= Rockdale County School District =

School district in Georgia (U.S. state)

Address
- 960 Pine Street Northeast Conyers, Georgia, 30012; United States
- Coordinates: 33.670960°N 84.019762°W

District information
- Grades: Pre-kindergarten – 12
- Superintendent: Shirley Chesser
- Accreditations: Southern Association of Colleges and Schools; Georgia Accrediting Commission

Students and staff
- Enrollment: 15,734 (2022–23)
- Faculty: 1,203.60 (FTE)
- Staff: 143.70 (FTE)
- Student–teacher ratio: 13.07

Other information
- Telephone: (770) 483-4713
- Website: rockdaleschools.org

The Rockdale County School District (also referred to as Rockdale County Public Schools or RCPS for short) is a public school district in Rockdale County, Georgia, United States, based in Conyers. It serves the communities of Conyers and Lakeview Estates. The current superintendent is Mrs. Shirley Chesser, who has been in this position since April 2025.

== Schools ==
The Rockdale County School District has eleven elementary schools, four middle schools, four non-traditional schools, and three high schools.

=== Elementary schools ===
- Barksdale Elementary School
- Flat Shoals Elementary School
- C.J. Hicks Elementary School
- Hightower Trail Elementary School
- Honey Creek Elementary School
- J.H. House Elementary School
- Lorraine Elementary School
- Peek's Chapel Elementary School
- Pine Street Elementary School
- Shoal Creek Elementary School
- Sims Elementary School

=== Middle schools ===
- Conyers Middle School
- Edwards Middle School
- General Ray Davis Middle School
- Memorial Middle School

=== High schools ===
- Heritage High School
- Rockdale County High School
- Salem High School

=== Non-traditional schools ===
- Alpha Academy
- Rockdale Career Academy
- Rockdale Magnet School for Science and Technology (STEM Certified High School)
- Rockdale Open Campus
