= Almand-O'Kelley-Walker House =

- U.S. National Register of Historic Places
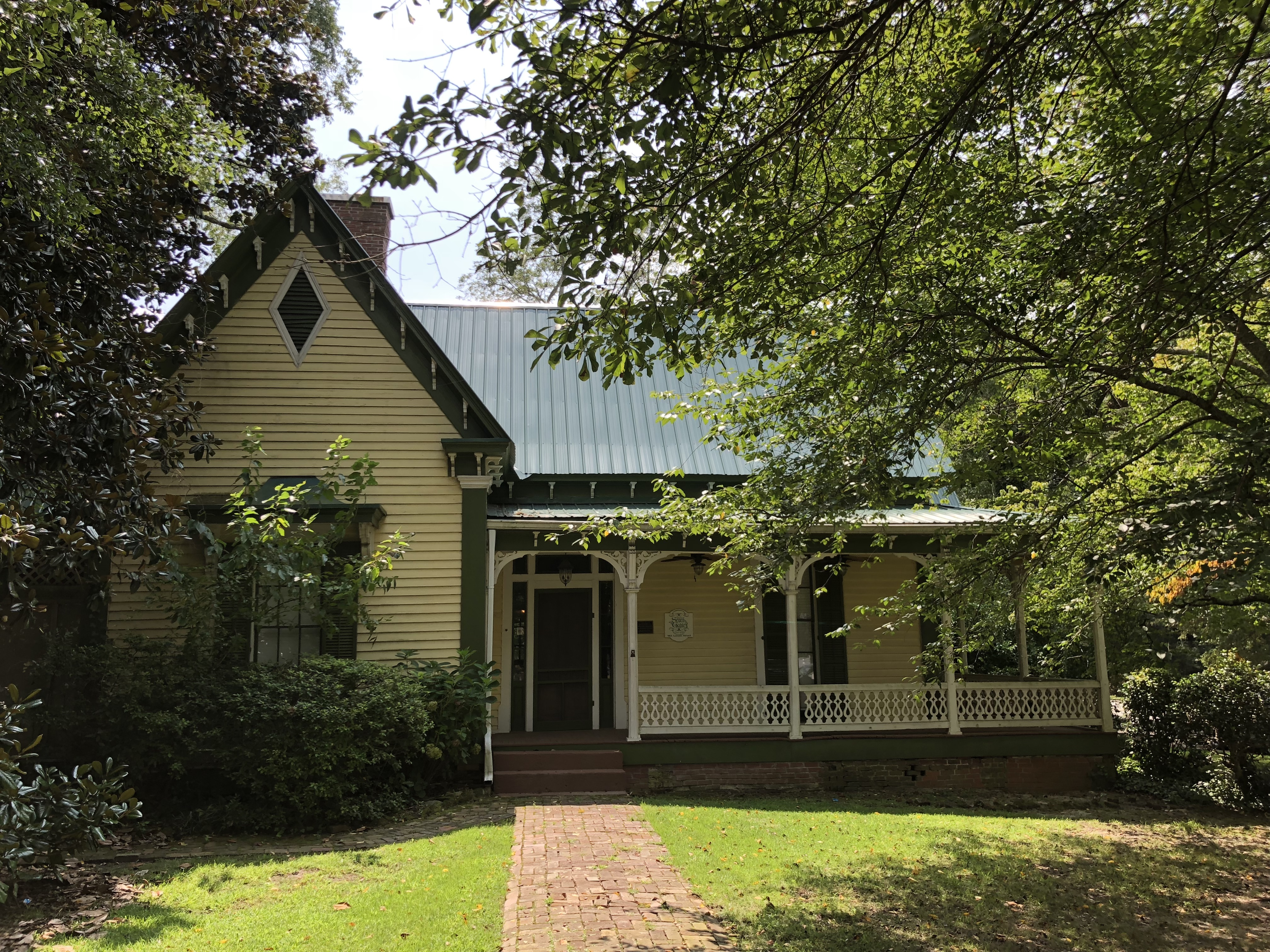
- Front door seen from Green Street

- Location within Georgia
- Location: 981 Green St., Conyers, Georgia
- Coordinates: 33°39′50″N 84°00′56″W
- Area: 1 acre (0.40 ha)
- Built: 1870
- Architectural style: Folk victorian
- NRHP reference No.: 97001647
- Added to NRHP: February 2, 1998

The Almand-O'Kelley-Walker House is a historic house built around 1870 in Conyers, Georgia. It was listed on the National Register of Historic Places in 1998.

John Henry Almand (1846-1918), the first owner of this house, lived here in the 1870s. He was a merchant, treasurer of the first Board of Education, and later county commissioner and organizer of the Conyers Institute School, as well as founder of the Bank of Rockdale.

John Floyd Almand (1848-1918), the builder of this house and second owner, lived here after John H. Almand’s ownership until 1884. He was cousin of John H. Almand.

The listing included three contributing buildings and two contributing structures.

== Architecture and design ==
This is a one story wooden house built in Folk Victorian style, featuring design details typically of that era.

=== Key architectural features include ===
- The house is built on brick piers.
- It has four original chimneys and six original fireplaces.
- The roof features seven gables (hence its nickname House of Seven Gables)
- Decorative sawn brackets are present under the eaves and on the porch supports.
- Original interior details remain intact, including heart pine floors, high ceilings (about 13 feet), plaster walls, picture moldings, and chair rails.
- The property also includes historic outbuildings, such as a garden shed and a storage shed dating from the 1920s.

All these features make this house a well preserved example of Flok victorian residential architecture from the late 19th century.

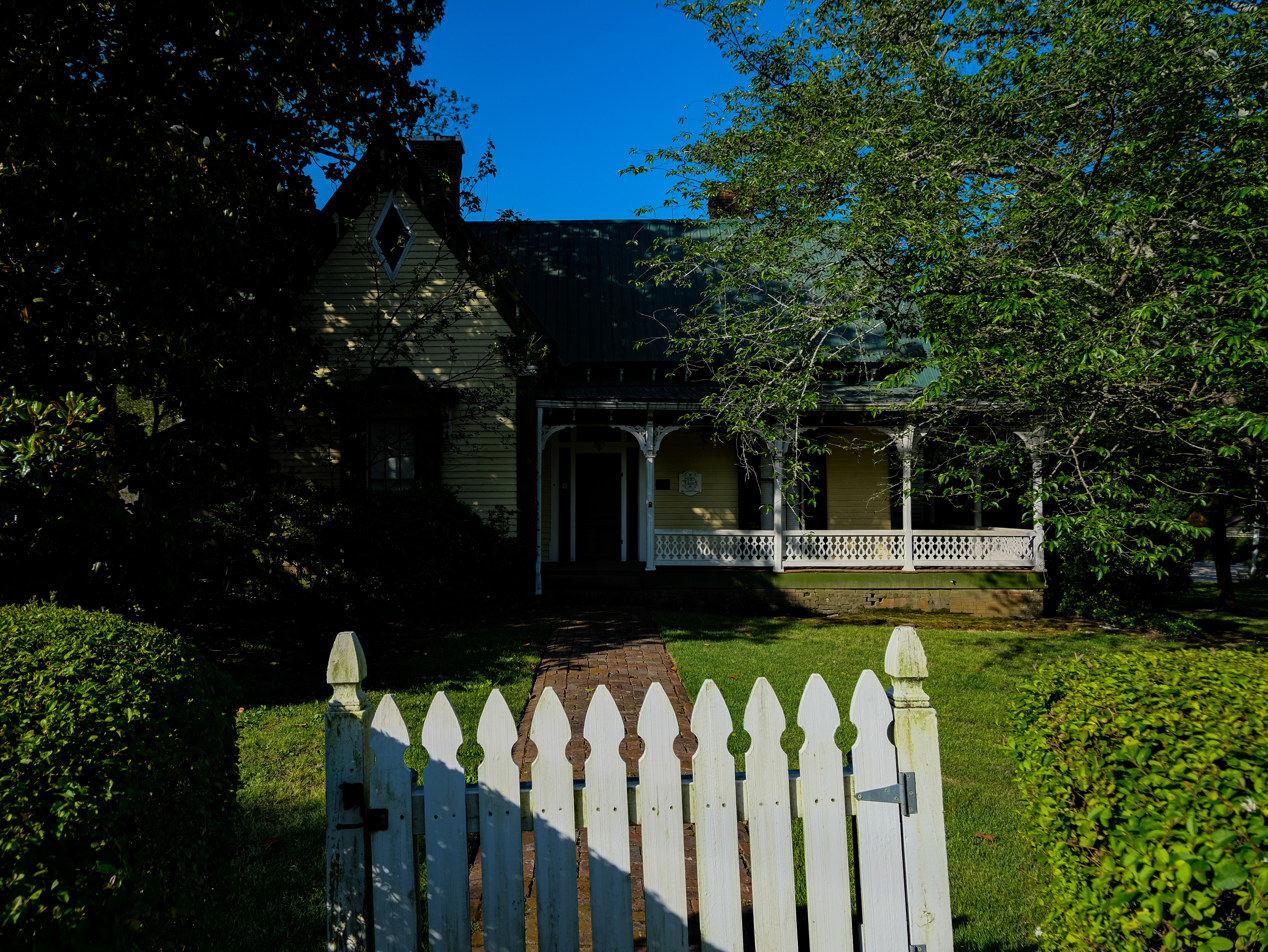
981 Green St., Conyers, Georgia - photographed by Christian Bessey.

== Photos ==
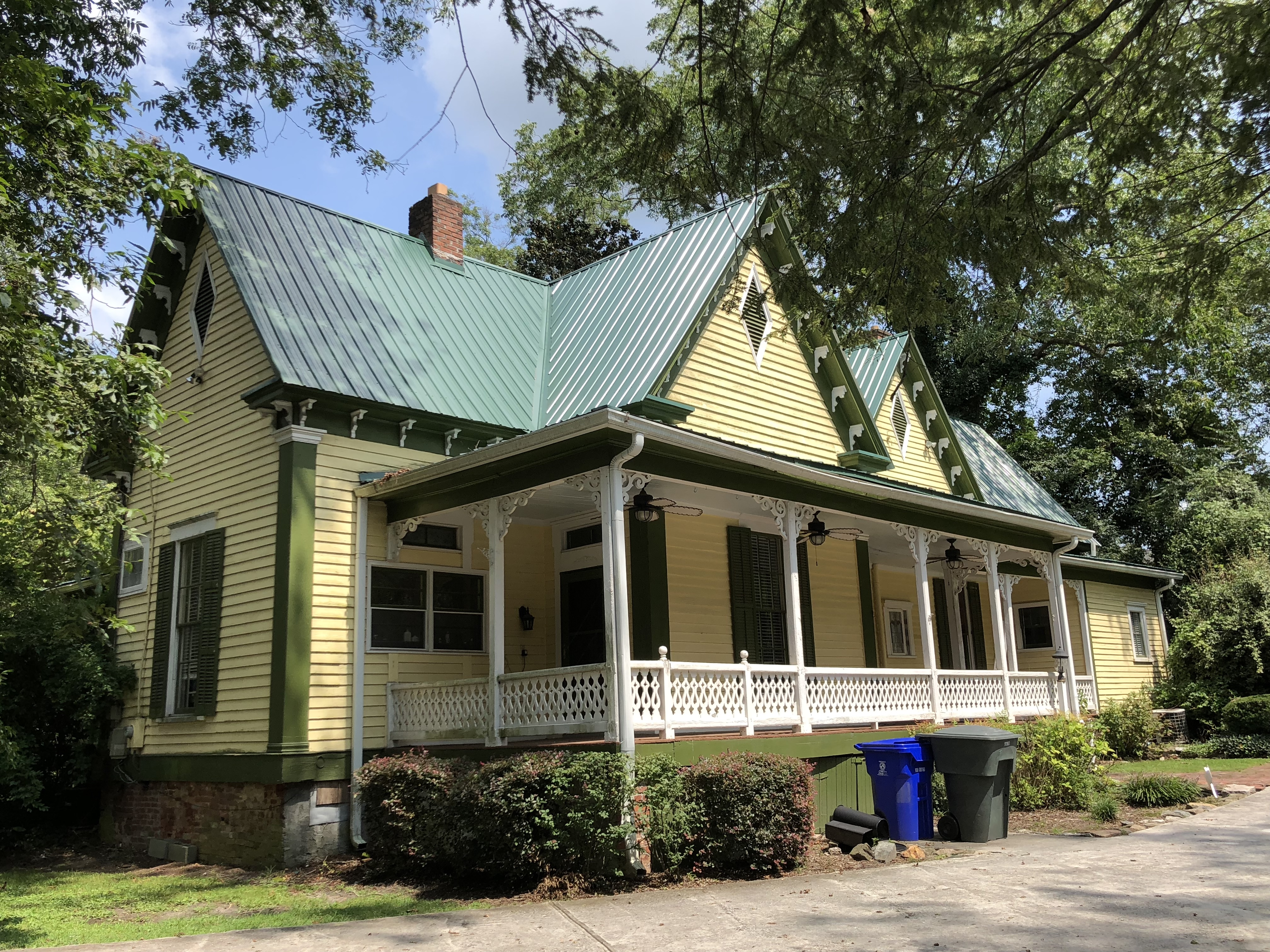
Rear porch seen from the driveway entrance on Scott Street.

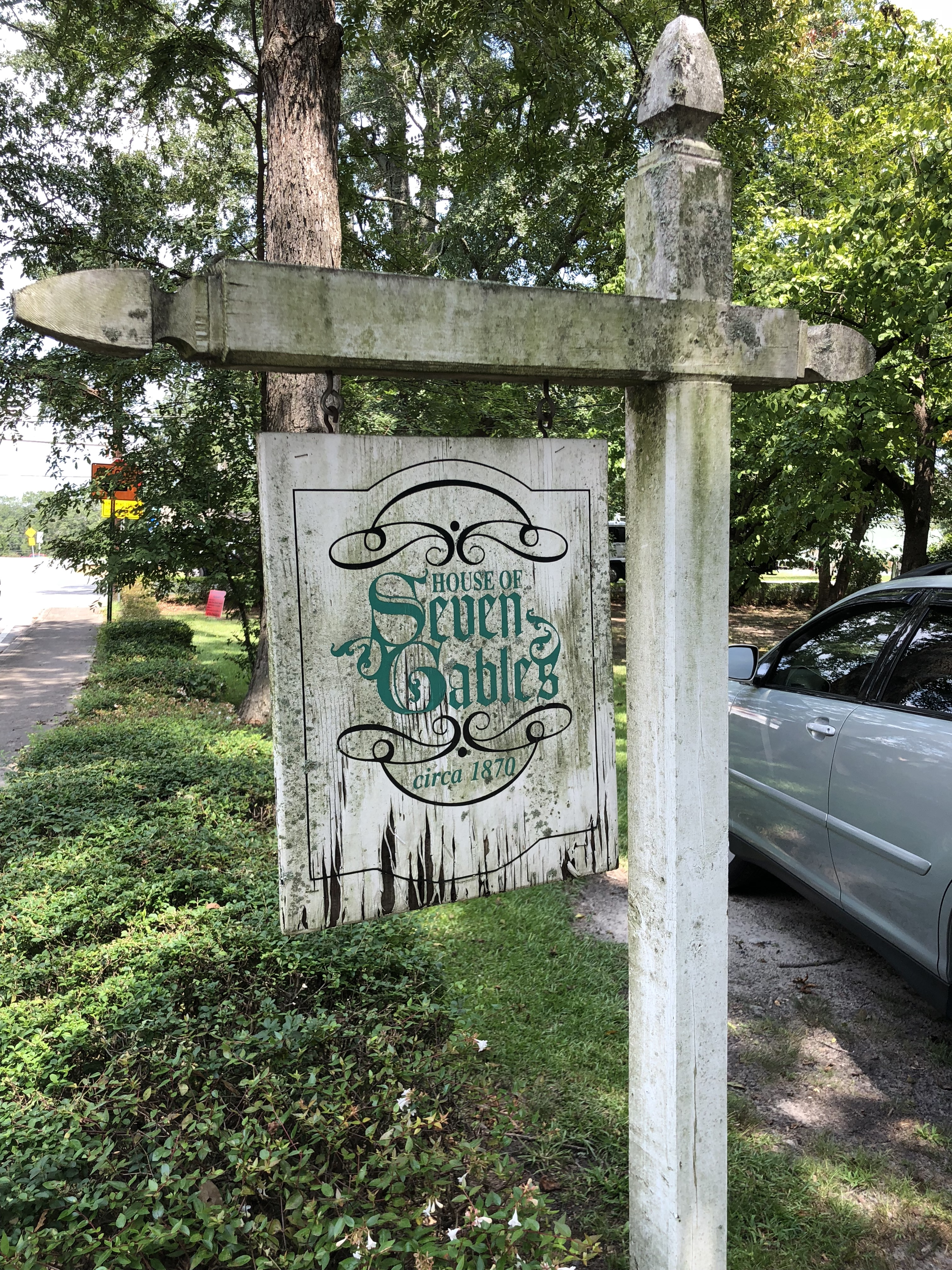
Sign along the Scott Street side of the property proclaiming it as the "House of Seven Gables, circa 1870"
