= Salem High School (Conyers, Georgia) =

Public secondary school in Conyers, Georgia, United States

Location
- 3551 Underwood Road Southeast; Conyers, Georgia 30013; United States; 33.595001°N 83.987777°W

Information
- Type: Public
- Established: 1991
- School district: Rockdale County School District
- Principal: Brandi Johnson
- Teaching staff: 66.80 FTE
- Grades: 9 to 12
- Gender: Coeducational
- Enrollment: 1,118 (2024-2025)
- Student to teacher ratio: 16.74
- Colors: Burgundy and yellow
- Athletics conference: 5 AAA
- Sports: Baseball, basketball, cheerleading, football, golf, soccer, softball, swimming, and tennis
- Mascot: Seminoles
- Nickname: SHS
- Team name: The Mighty Noles
- Accreditation: Southern Association of Colleges and Schools
- Newspaper: The Signal
- Yearbook: The War Cry

Salem High School is one of three public secondary schools in the Rockdale County School District in Conyers, Georgia, United States. The school educates about 1,100 students in grades 9 to 12 in the Rockdale County Public School district.

== Information ==
Salem High School is located in Conyers, in East Metro Atlanta. First led by Robert Creswell, it was established in 1991 as the third high school in Rockdale County, coming to be known as the Seminoles. Approximately 1,100 students are enrolled.

The school was named a State School of Excellence in 1999 and in 2007, and a National School of Excellence in 2000.

In the Taylor's Publishing Yearbook for 2007, the staff received the Honorable Mention recognition award for their annual, themed "Making Connections."

== Athletics ==
Salem is a part of the GHSA in Region 5-AAA. The school has teams for football, softball, competition cheerleading, swim team, women's and men's basketball, baseball, women's and men's soccer, golf, tennis, track and field, and cross country.

In 2004 the football Seminoles played an undefeated season and went to the Georgia Dome, in their greatest playoff berth, but lost to Statesboro High School, leaving them in a 13-1 season. In 2005, they once again won the region championship, but lost in the 2nd round playoff to Marist High School, 35-14.

Torrell Troup, a 2006 graduate, was drafted in the second round of the 2010 NFL draft by the Buffalo Bills.

== Notable alumni ==
- Akil Baddoo, MLB outfielder
- Billy Buckner, MLB pitcher
- Da'shawn Thomas, CFL player
- Torrell Troup, NFL player
- Teddy Swims, Musical Artist
