= Testicular self-examination =

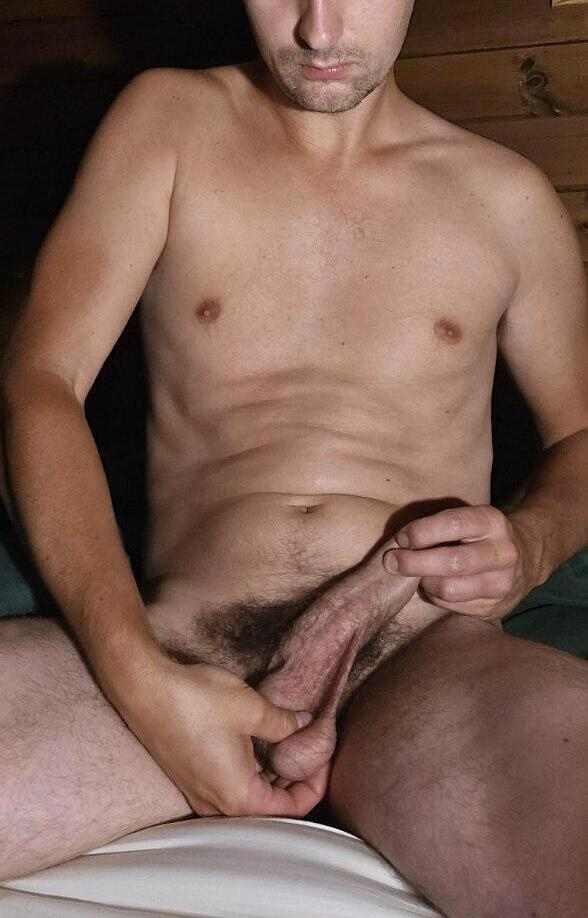
- A man examines his testicles
- Other names: TSE
- MedlinePlus: 003909

Testicular self-examination (TSE) is a procedure where a man examines his own testicles and scrotum for possible lumps or swelling. It is usually undertaken at home while standing in front of a mirror and after having a warm bath or shower. Monthly self-examination of the testicles starting at puberty may be an effective way of detecting testicular cancer at an early, potentially treatable stage, which can lead to a 5-year survival rate of 98%. In men aged 15 to 40, testicular cancer is the most common cancer, and the annual rate of increase over the last 10 years in cases of testicular cancer is approximately 1% each year. Testicular cancer typically presents with a painless testicular swelling or a lump or any change in shape or texture of the testicles.

TSE is also indicated if there are certain risk factors present, such as a family history of testicular cancer. Additionally, outside of the possible early detection of testicular cancer, other "off label" uses of TSEs include detection of indirect inguinal hernias, varicocele, and infections that may affect the testicles, such as mumps. The efficacy of TSEs in detection of these pathologies relies on proper technique, but if done correctly, TSEs can be very beneficial to the health of the individual and have many public health benefits as well.

== Uses ==
Monthly self-examination of the testicles, starting at puberty, may be an effective way of detecting testicular cancer at an early, and potentially treatable stage. Recommendations vary with some physicians recommending the use of monthly TSE for men ages 15 to 55.

Practitioners may recommend testicular self-exam (TSE) when the following risk factors are present:

- Family history of testicular cancer
- Past testicular tumor
- Undescended testicle
- Testicular atrophy

== Professional guidelines ==
There is no general medical consensus for recommendations on TSE. The effectiveness of performing TSE in reducing morbidity and mortality from testicular cancer is not known. Not all organizations endorse the procedure as a screening test, arguing that it may lead to unnecessary treatments and unnecessary anxiety. The benefit of TSE is uncertain due to there being no randomized control trial studying the use of TSE. Many organizations have established guidelines regarding the utilization of testicular self examination as well as the use of testicular examination by a medical provider as a diagnostic tool. These guidelines can be found in the table below.

Current recommendations for testicular examination
Organization	Recommendation
US Preventive Services Task Force	Grade D rating, Not recommended to be conducted by clinician nor patient.
American Urological Association	List TSE as a screening test in their "Men's Health Checklist" for urologists and other clinicians
American Academy of Family Physicians	Recommend against screening due to high cure rates of advanced disease, false positives, and harms caused by diagnostic procedures.
American Cancer Society	No defined recommendation but state it should be conducted when completing a thorough routine cancer screening.
Royal Australasian College of General Practitioners	Recommend against screening since there is no evidence that those who routinely screen will be able to detect early-stage tumors.
European Association of Urology	Recommend screening in those with clinical risk factors.

== Technique ==
For men who choose to perform TSE, it is recommended to perform TSE once monthly, at approximately the same time every month. Performing TSE during or after a warm bath or shower may help to relax the skin of the scrotum and make the structures within the scrotum easier to feel.

Existing guidelines indicate that TSE is best performed in the standing position. Individuals performing TSE may choose to stand in front of a mirror in order to visualize the scrotum and testicles from various angles. First, the scrotum and testicles may be visually examined for any skin changes or visible swelling. Then, with the thumb placed on the upper surface and the index and middle finger placed on the lower surface, each testicle can be rolled between the thumb and fingers to feel for potential findings. It is also recommended to locate and feel the epididymis, a soft, rope- or tube-like structure that runs behind each testicle, in order to avoid confusing this structure for a potentially abnormal finding.

== Findings ==
Normal findings during TSE include testicles that feel round, smooth, and homogenous in texture, and that are mobile within the scrotum. It is normal and common for one testicle to be larger and hang lower in the scrotum than the other.

Findings that may be abnormal and should be discussed with healthcare providers include:

- Pain or tenderness to touch
- Firm lumps
- Swelling or fluid buildup
- Changes in testicular size or the relative size of both testicles, compared to the individual's baseline

== Limitations ==
The effectiveness of performing routine TSE in men without symptoms in reducing morbidity and mortality from testicular cancer is not clear, and as such, not all organizations endorse the procedure as a screening test, arguing that it may lead to unnecessary treatments. Additionally, some signs and symptoms of testicular cancer found during TSE are common to other disorders of the male urinary tract and reproductive organs, including hydrocele testis, spermatocele, genitourinary system cancers, urinary tract infections, sexually transmitted infections, or testicular torsion, which may prompt medical attention to preserve reproductive and urinary function. These potential false positives may cause unnecessary concern or anxiety to patients.

== Society and culture ==
Testicular self-examination has generally low rates of practice in part because young men have very low rates of health-seeking behaviors, leading to higher rates of mortality and morbidity. This is likely influenced by the fact that men face potential perceived societal pressures and judgement, which create obstacles to these patients seeking care.

== Education and promotion ==
Educational interventions that teach men about and how to perform testicular self-examination have been shown to improve men's knowledge and beliefs surrounding TSEs and testicular health. Educational programs using brochures, videos, online-based lessons, and other methods have improved men's self-efficacy in performing the exam and increased recognized benefits of the exam. Other successful interventions have included motivational videos and virtual reality (VR). These interventions have been shown to increase the likelihood of performing these self-checks and have also increased men's testicular health knowledge. Programs that are delivered by medical professionals such as nurses or physicians are considered to be the most effective for improving awareness and knowledge.

Complementary approaches using humor-based public health messages have also been explored to make discussions of men's health less stigmatized and more approachable. These public health messages tend to use puns or sexual innuendos (i.e. "Touch Yourself Tonight"). Evidence shows that humor-based public service announcements about TSEs can reduce anxiety and stigma, and increase motivation towards performing these self checks. Researchers do note that the humor must be audience appropriate in order to effectively reach a wide variety of men. Sexualized or stereotypical humor may isolate some men, whereas lighter humor that avoids sexualized or stereotypical rhetoric can enhance promotion and awareness.

== See also ==
- Breast self-examination
- Well-woman examination
