= Conyers, Georgia =

- City
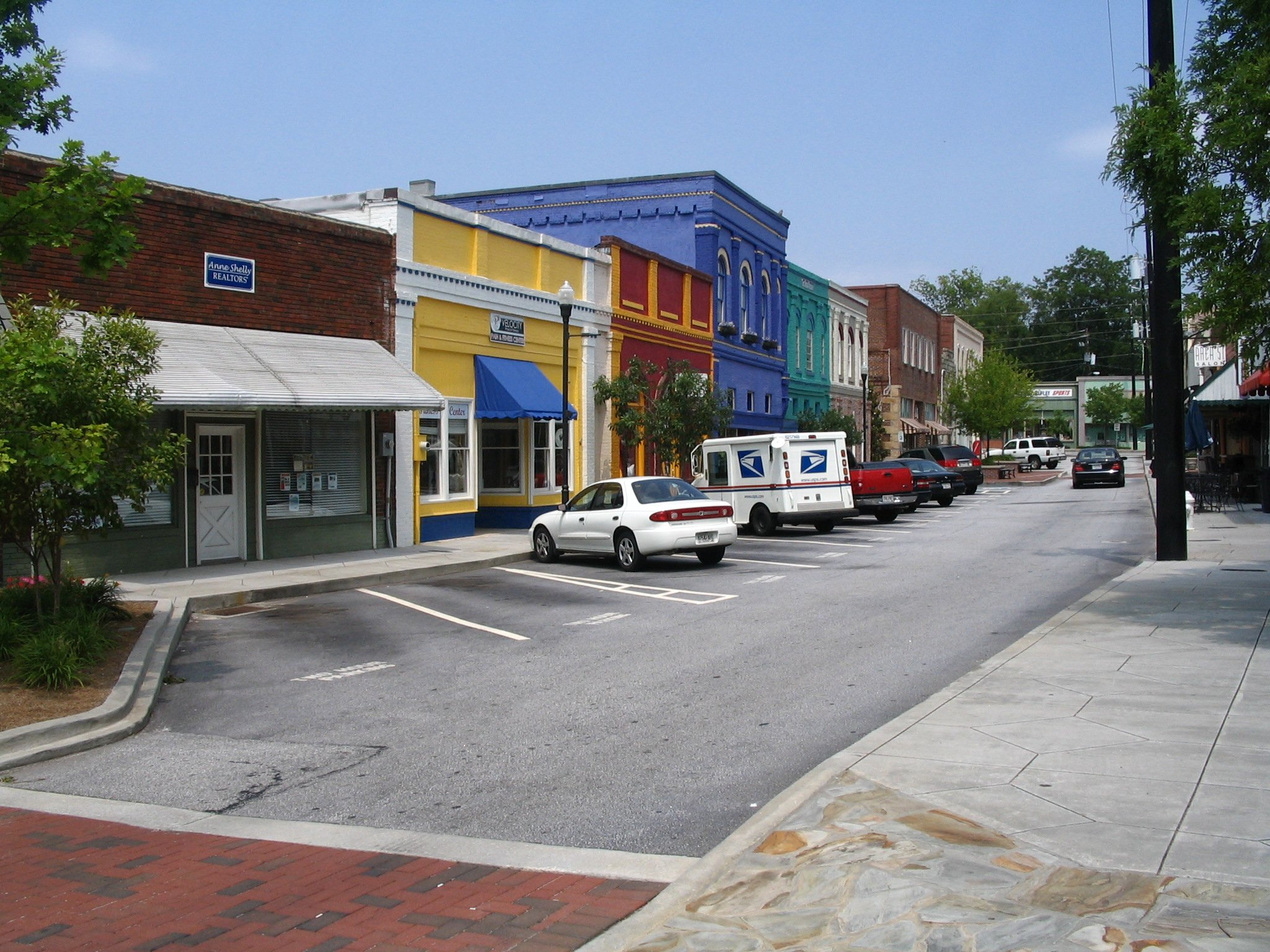
- Olde Town Conyers
- Nickname: C-Town
- Interactive map of Conyers, Georgia
- Coordinates: 33°39′59″N 84°0′27″W
- Country: United States
- State: Georgia
- County: Rockdale
- Incorporated: 1854; 172 years ago
- Named for: Dr. W. D. Conyers

Government
  - Type: Council–manager
  - Mayor: Connie Alsobrook
  - City Manager: Kameron Kelley

Area
  - Total: 11.88 sq mi (30.78 km^{2})
  - Land: 11.76 sq mi (30.46 km^{2})
  - Water: 0.12 sq mi (0.32 km^{2})
- Elevation: 899 ft (274 m)

Population (2020)
  - Total: 17,305
  - Density: 1,471.5/sq mi (568.14/km^{2})
- Time zone: UTC-5 (Eastern (EST))
  - Summer (DST): UTC-4 (EDT)
- ZIP codes: 30012, 30013, 30094
- Area code: 470/678/770
- FIPS code: 13-19336
- GNIS feature ID: 0312910
- Website: www.conyersga.com

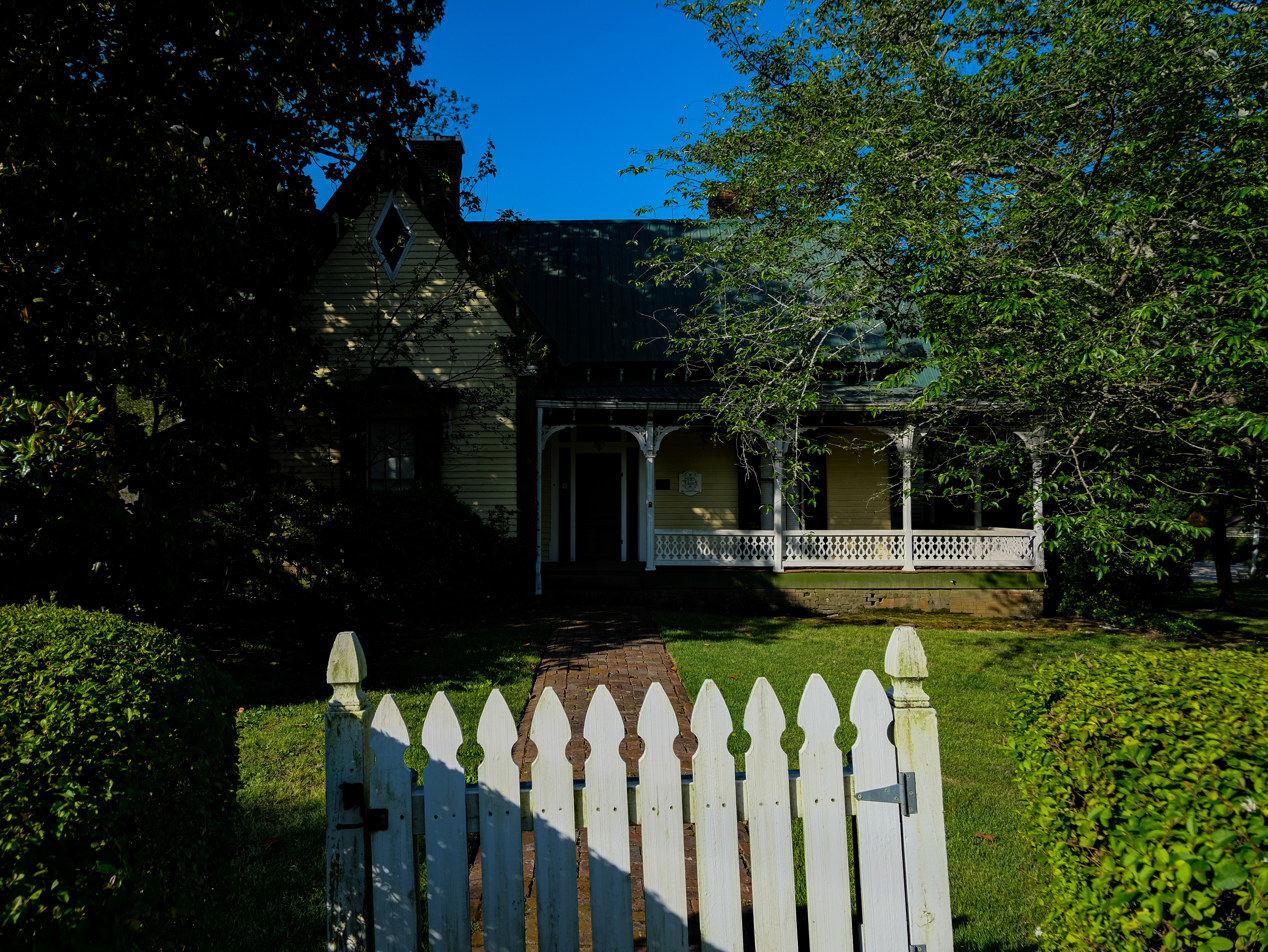
Almand-O'Kelley-Walker House, one of many historic homes in Conyers

Conyers is a city in and the county seat of Rockdale County, Georgia, United States. The city is 24 miles (38.6 km) east of downtown Atlanta and is a part of the Atlanta metropolitan area. As of 2020, its population was 17,305. The formerly separate town of Milstead is now part of Conyers.

== History ==
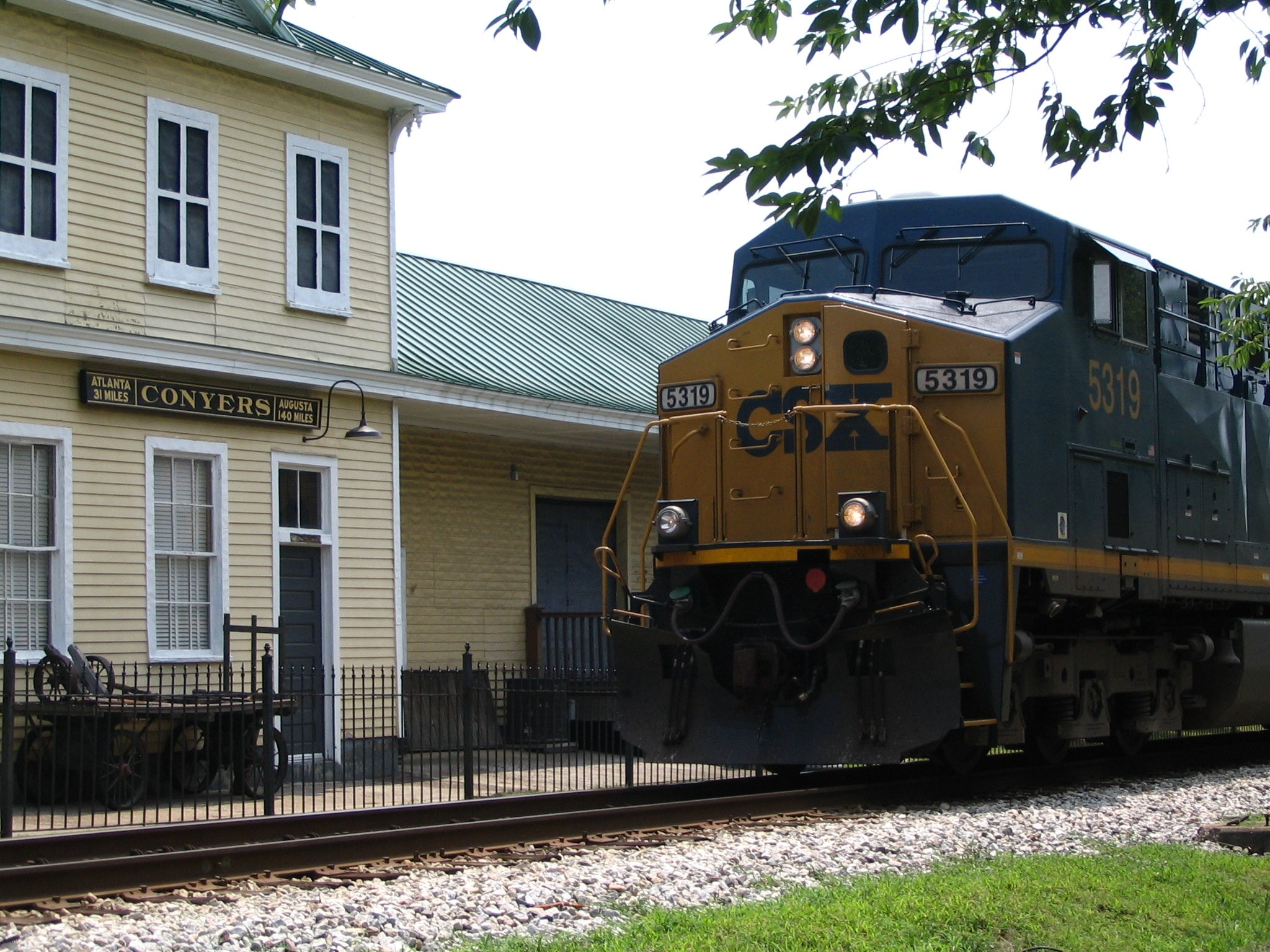
Conyers Depot

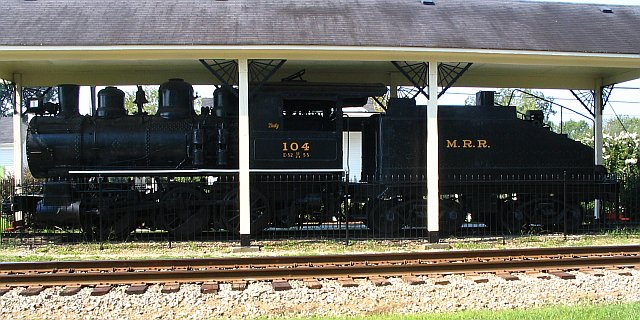
A 1905 Rogers Steam Locomotive, named "Dinky", on display in Conyers. The engine carried freight between Conyers and Milstead until 1961.

Between 1816 and 1821, the area known as Rockdale was open for settlement. John Holcomb, a blacksmith, was the first settler in what is now Conyers. He settled where the current Rockdale County Courthouse is located, in the middle of Conyers on Main Street.

Eventually, pressure arose for a railroad to cross Georgia; the railroad was intended to run from Augusta, through neighboring Covington to Marthasville (now known as Atlanta). John Holcomb was against the railroad and refused to sell his land, and threatened to shoot anyone from the railroad who came onto his property.

Dr. W. D. Conyers, a banker from Covington, eventually persuaded John Holcomb into selling his land for $700. Dr. Conyers then sold the land to the Georgia Railroad. What is now Conyers began as a watering post along this line, named after Dr. Conyers. By 1845, the railroad was in full operation. By 1854, nearly 400 residents lived around the watering post, and Conyers was incorporated.

Conyers has been nearly destroyed several times by fire. It is said to have survived Sherman's March to the Sea due to a friend of Sherman's who lived in the area between Conyers and Covington. The story goes that the houses were spared because Sherman was uncertain where his friend lived.

In 1870, the surrounding area was incorporated into Rockdale County out of Newton County, Georgia, and Conyers became the county seat.

Over the next decade, Conyers grew into a wild town. It had 12 saloons and five brothels. The more reputable side of the town had 40 stores, Conyers College, a hotel, a carriage manufacturer, and good schools.

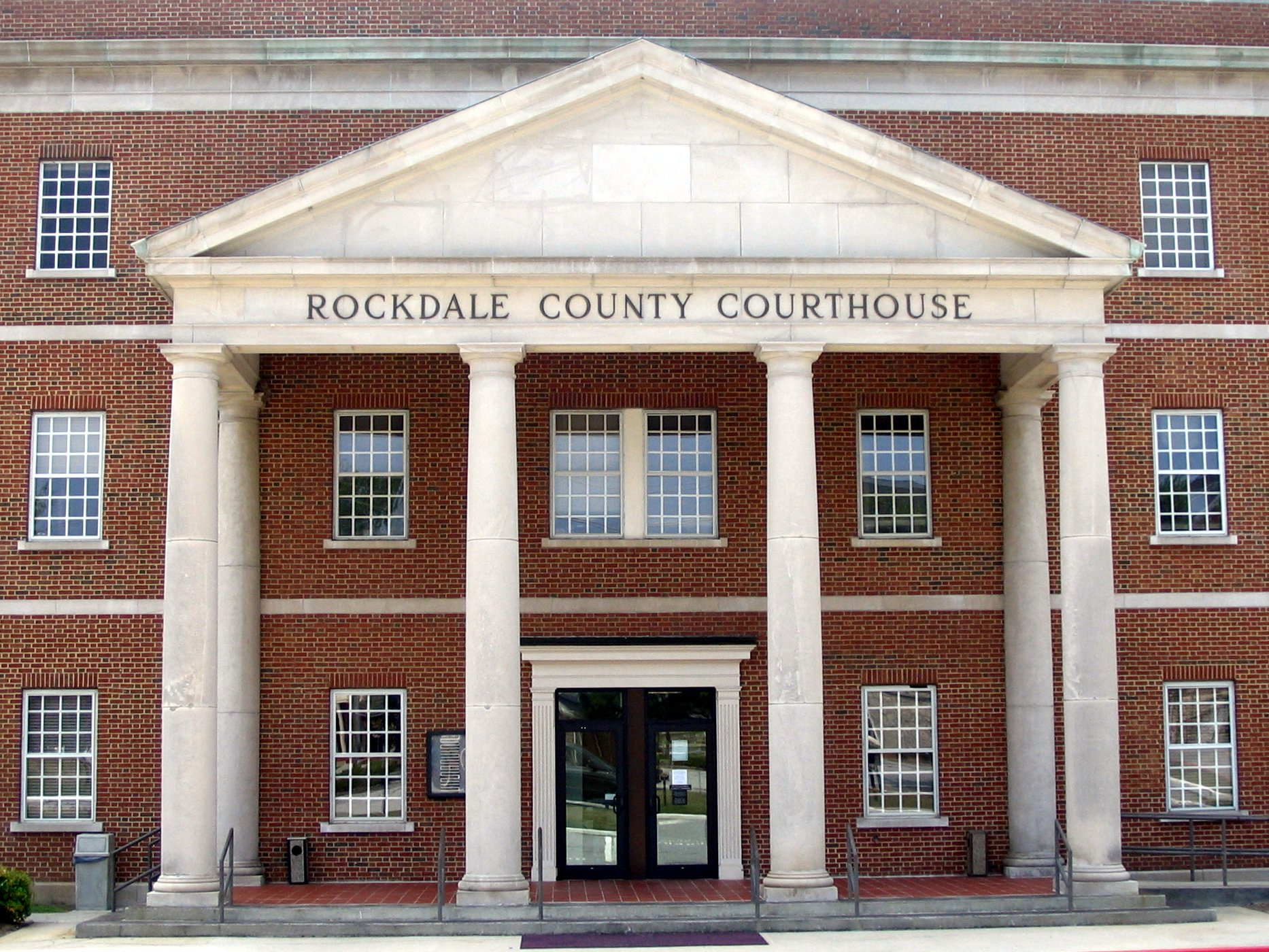
Rockdale County Courthouse

The Conyers post office contains a mural, The Ploughman, painted in 1940 by Elizabeth Terrell. Murals were produced from 1934 to 1943 in the United States through the Section of Painting and Sculpture, later called the Section of Fine Arts, of the Treasury Department. The Works Progress Administration was the largest and most ambitious American New Deal agency, employing individuals to carry out public works projects.

Conyers was also home to "sidewalk churches". Along Main Street grew First Methodist, Conyers Presbyterian, and First Baptist. At some point, the congregants are thought to have persuaded the brothels and saloons to close and leave Conyers for Covington, using a mob. This rose out of revivals begun in 1878 with the Methodist and Presbyterian churches. First Baptist Church of Conyers moved out of downtown in late 2000, moving about 2 miles (3.2 km) south of the Georgia International Horse Park to their current location.

Tightly connected to Conyers is Milstead, a mill town now incorporated into Conyers. At its peak, Milstead and Conyers had a private railroad that delivered products, such as cotton, from the mill to Conyers for shipping to the textile mills. In the 1960s, the mill closed.

In 1944, a Trappist monastery (a Catholic order), Abbey of the Holy Spirit, was established south of the city by Dom Frederic Dunne. The Protestant community of Rockdale County helped with the completion of the current structure. M. Basil Pennington, one of the founders of the Centering Prayer movement, was abbot of the monastery from 2000 to 2002.

In the 1950s, Conyers had a Coca-Cola bottling facility. In 1957, Lithonia Lighting moved from Lithonia.

In the 1960s, Interstate 20 was built through the county.

In the 1970s, parts of the first five episodes of the Dukes of Hazzard were filmed in the town.

In the 1980s, Conyers became known for "White Road", where resident Nancy Fowler claimed to have seen apparitions of the Virgin Mary. Throughout the late 1980s and early 1990s, Conyers played host to pilgrims.

In the early 1990s, several scenes of In the Heat of the Night were filmed around the Conyers Depot. Alan Autry, who played the character of Captain Bubba Skinner, was seen as a regular around Conyers during the filming.

In 1996, Conyers hosted the equestrian and mountain biking events for the 1996 Olympic Games held in Atlanta. For this, Conyers built the Georgia International Horse Park.

On May 20, 1999, a school shooting took place, known as the Heritage High School shooting. Six students were injured before the 15-year-old gunman surrendered to the police.

In October 1999, Rockdale County, and by extension the county seat of Conyers, gained substantial notoriety when the Public Broadcasting Service series Frontline aired a nationwide documentary entitled The Lost Children of Rockdale County detailing a syphilis outbreak among middle- and high-school-aged teenagers within the county. The documentary was well received outside Conyers, with rave reviews from such outlets as The Wall Street Journal and Entertainment Weekly.

Identical twins and former residents Tasmiyah Janeesha Whitehead and Jasmiyah Kaneesha Whitehead (both born November 27, 1993) were arrested on May 21, 2010, for having committed matricide. The victim was Jarmecca Yvonne Whitehead (born April 18, 1975), who also went by the nickname "Nikki". She was beaten and stabbed and placed in a tub full of water where her daughters left her to die as they left for Rockdale County High School. The crime occurred on January 13, 2010, in the Bridle Ridge Walk subdivision on Appaloosa Way. The crime sent shock waves throughout the community. Jarmecca's autopsy revealed that she suffered injuries to her lungs and jugular vein, and had a severed spinal cord. Initially, the twins proclaimed their innocence, but in 2014, they pleaded guilty and are serving 30-year sentences in separate prisons. The crime was featured in a few true-crime documentaries and television shows, which include Dateline NBC in an episode titled "Bad Blood", Snapped episode 1403 titled "The Whitehead Twins", and Evil Twins in an episode titled "Honor Roll Killers", a show that airs on the Investigation Discovery network (see also Murder of Nikki Whitehead).

From 2013 to 2018, the CW show The Originals was filmed in Conyers.

A chemical fire at a BioLab facility in the city resulted in shelter-in-place orders for over 90,000 Georgians in late September 2024. Due to a miscalculation on how long the fire would last, shelter-in-place orders lasted hours and even days after the fire was put out issued by the National Weather Service.

== Geography ==
Conyers is located at 33°39′59″N 84°0′27″W (33.666360, −84.007574).

The city is located in the eastern part of Metro Atlanta along Interstate 20, which provides access to the city from exits 80 and 82. I-20 leads west 24 miles (39 km) to downtown Atlanta and east 122 miles (196 km) to Augusta. U.S. Route 278 also runs through the city, concurrent with I-20. Other highways that run through the city include Georgia State Routes 20 and 138. GA-20 leads northeast 16 miles (26 km) to Loganville and southwest 20 miles (32 km) to McDonough. GA-138 leads northeast 21 miles (34 km) to Monroe and southwest 18 miles (29 km) to Stockbridge.

According to the United States Census Bureau, the city has a total area of 11.9 square miles (31 km^{2}), of which 11.8 square miles (31 km^{2}) are land and 0.1 square miles (0.26 km^{2}) (1.17%) is covered by water.

== Demographics ==
Historical population
Census	Pop.	Note	%±
1870	637		—
1880	1,374		115.7%
1890	1,349		−1.8%
1900	1,605		19.0%
1910	1,919		19.6%
1920	1,817		−5.3%
1930	1,495		−17.7%
1940	1,619		8.3%
1950	2,003		23.7%
1960	2,881		43.8%
1970	4,890		69.7%
1980	6,567		34.3%
1990	7,380		12.4%
2000	10,689		44.8%
2010	15,195		42.2%
2020	17,305		13.9%
2025 (est.)	20,337	▲	17.5%
U.S. Decennial Census; 2025

=== Racial and ethnic composition ===
Conyers city, Georgia – Racial and ethnic composition Note: the US Census treats Hispanic/Latino as an ethnic category. This table excludes Latinos from the racial categories and assigns them to a separate category. Hispanics/Latinos may be of any race.
Race / Ethnicity (NH = Non-Hispanic)	Pop 2000	Pop 2010	Pop 2020	% 2000	% 2010	% 2020
White alone (NH)	5,536	3,699	2,611	51.79%	24.34%	15.09%
Black or African American alone (NH)	3,552	8,474	12,047	33.23%	55.77%	69.62%
Native American or Alaska Native alone (NH)	31	32	37	0.29%	0.21%	0.21%
Asian alone (NH)	278	210	183	2.60%	1.38%	1.06%
Native Hawaiian or Pacific Islander alone (NH)	4	16	20	0.04%	0.11%	0.12%
Other race alone (NH)	18	55	75	0.17%	0.36%	0.43%
Mixed race or Multiracial (NH)	117	234	601	1.09%	1.54%	3.47%
Hispanic or Latino (any race)	1,153	2,475	1,731	10.79%	16.29%	10.00%
Total	10,689	15,195	17,305	100.00%	100.00%	100.00%

=== 2020 census ===
As of the 2020 census, Conyers had a population of 17,305. The median age was 34.2 years. 27.4% of residents were under the age of 18 and 12.5% were 65 years of age or older. For every 100 females there were 78.5 males, and for every 100 females age 18 and over there were 72.8 males age 18 and over.

99.6% of residents lived in urban areas, while 0.4% lived in rural areas.

There were 6,365 households and 3,848 families in Conyers. Of all households, 40.2% had children under the age of 18 living in them, 26.9% were married-couple households, 20.0% were households with a male householder and no spouse or partner present, and 46.0% were households with a female householder and no spouse or partner present. About 29.3% of all households were made up of individuals, and 8.8% had someone living alone who was 65 years of age or older.

There were 7,021 housing units, of which 9.3% were vacant. The homeowner vacancy rate was 4.3% and the rental vacancy rate was 7.6%.

== Education ==
The Rockdale County School District holds preschool to grade 12, and consists of 11 elementary schools, four middle schools, three high schools, and four non-traditional schools. The district has 889 full-time teachers and over 13,801 students.

== Sports ==
East Atlanta FC is a semi-professional soccer club that plays in the United Soccer League 2. The team is composed of college players who play in the summer months at Rockdale Youth Soccer Association at Team Rehabilitation field. The club also features a youth team that plays in the USL academy league and also has a partnership with Rockdale Youth Soccer Association as a Youth Development Partner.

== Notable people ==
- Jill Arrington, sports anchor at KCBS-TV, formerly with Fox Sports 1 and CBS Sports
- Tyler Austin, former Major League Baseball player and current NPB player for the Yokohama DeNA Baystars
- Jesse Baker, former NFL defensive end with the Houston Oilers and Dallas Cowboys
- Jerome Boger, NFL referee
- Billy Buckner, MLB pitcher
- Cartel band members Will Pugh, Joseph Pepper, Nic Hudson, Kevin Sanders, and Ryan Roberts
- Chris Cockrum, NASCAR driver
- Chuggaaconroy, YouTuber, internet personality and Let's Player
- Geoff Collins, former head coach of Georgia Tech Football
- Janice Shaw Crouse
- David Elder, former MLB player
- Dakota Fanning, actress
- Elle Fanning, actress
- Buck Farmer, baseball pitcher for the Atlanta Braves
- Candace Hill, 100-m and 200-m sprint IAAF World Youth Championship winner
- Holly Hunter, actress
- Grady Jarrett, NFL player for the Atlanta Falcons
- Ben L. Jones, "Crazy" Cooter Davenport in The Dukes of Hazzard; politician
- DeForest Kelley, Dr. Leonard "Bones" McCoy, of TV's Star Trek: The Original Series
- Matt Kennon, singer
- Dr Heavenly Kimes, Married to Medicine star
- Daphanie LaShaunn, Referee for WWE
- Clint Mathis, World Cup soccer player
- Jack McBrayer, actor
- James C. Miller III, former U.S. government official and economist
- Marcus Printup, jazz trumpeter with Wynton Marsalis and the Jazz at Lincoln Center Orchestra
- Johnny Rapid, actor
- Scott Russell, WSBK Champion, five-time Daytona winner
- E. R. Shipp, Pulitzer Prize-winning journalist
- Teddy Swims, singer, songwriter
- Marion Tinsley, checkers expert
- Dave Willis, co-creator of Aqua Teen Hunger Force and Squidbillies
- Jaylen Yearwood, soccer player
- Ron Young, racing driver
